= Yakoun =

Yakoun (Haida: Yaaguun) may refer to:

- Yakoun Group, a geologic group in British Columbia, Canada
- Yakoun Lake, a lake in Haida Gwaii, British Columbia, Canada
- Yakoun River, a river in Haida Gwaii, British Columbia, Canada
- Yaaguun Suu Conservancy, a conservancy in Haida Gwaii, British Columbia, Canada
