= Hadwin's Judgement =

- Film poster
- Directed by: Sasha Snow
- Produced by: Elizabeth Yake; David Allen; David Christensen; Yves J. Ma
- Starring: John Vaillant; Doug Chapman
- Cinematography: Simon Schneider; Sasha Snow
- Edited by: Gareth C. Scales; Ben Stark
- Music by: Jack Ketch
- Distributed by: National Film Board
- Release date: April 27, 2015
- Running time: 87 minutes
- Country: Canada
- Language: English

Hadwin's Judgement is a Canadian documentary film, released in 2015. Directed by Sasha Snow and based in part on John Vaillant's 2004 book The Golden Spruce, the film is about Grant Hadwin, the logger who protested logging company practices by cutting down the sacred Kiidk'yaas in 1997. The film also includes some docudrama elements, in which Hadwin is portrayed by actor Doug Chapman.

== Reception ==
The film premiered in April 2015 at the Hot Docs Canadian International Documentary Festival. In February 2016, it was named Best Canadian film at the Vancouver International Mountain Film Festival.

The film received two Canadian Screen Award nominations at the 4th Canadian Screen Awards in 2016, in the categories of Best Feature Length Documentary and Best Cinematography in a Documentary.
