= Port Clements =

- Village
- Village of Port Clements
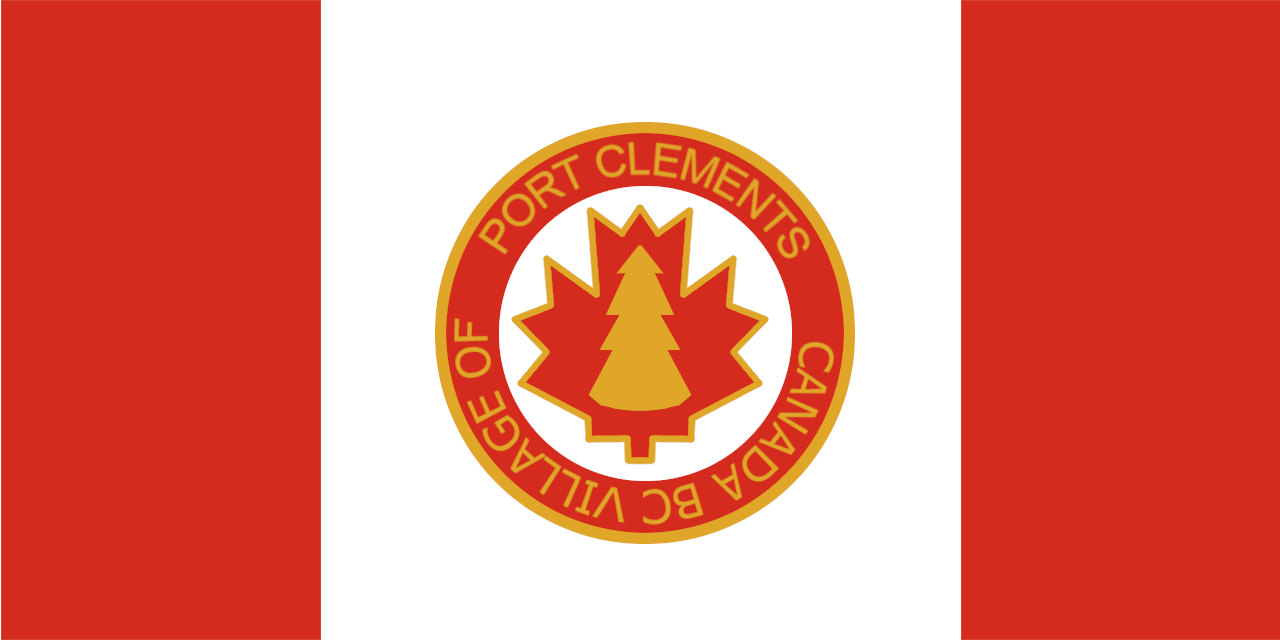
- Flag

- Location of Port Clements in British Columbia Port Clements (Canada)
- Coordinates: 53°41′16″N 132°10′08″W
- Country: Canada
- Province: British Columbia
- Region: Haida Gwaii
- Regional district: Skeena-Queen Charlotte
- Founded: 1907
- Incorporated: 1975

Government
  - Governing body: Port Clements Village Council
  - Mayor: Doug Daugert

Area
  - Total: 13.59 km^{2} (5.25 sq mi)
- Elevation: 5 m (16 ft)

Population (2021)
  - Total: 340
  - Density: 26/km^{2} (67/sq mi)
- Time zone: UTC−07:00 (PT)
- Highways: Highway 16 (TCH)
- Waterways: Masset Inlet
- Website: Port Clements

Port Clements is an incorporated village situated at the east end of Masset Inlet in Haida Gwaii (formerly the Queen Charlotte Islands) off the coast of the Province of British Columbia in Canada. Known as Gamadiis in HlG̱aagilda X̱aayda kil, it is one of seven village sites that flourished in the rich waters at the mouth of Yakoun River, where an estuary shelters nine Pacific salmonid species and many kinds of birds. Founded by Eli Tingley in 1907, it was once known under the name Queenstown, but renamed to Port Clements in 1914 after Herb S. Clements, the local MP at the time (for Comox—Atlin, then 1917-1921 for Comox—Alberni), when the name "Queenstown" duplicated and therefore became unusable for the post office.

The highway leading to Port Clements from Tlell and from Port Clements to Masset was paved in 1969 and soon after completion the village became incorporated in 1975. The road to Tlell is called the straight stretch, as it is straight. The other main road that heads west to Juskatla Camp and back south to Queen Charlotte City is still gravel and mainly a logging road only open to public traffic after working hours.

Port Clements was and still is to a lesser extent the centre of the remaining logging on northern Graham Island. In this community 29.2% of the labour force works in the forest industry. Most of the processing takes place in Juskatla Camp.

Past tourist attractions were Kiidk'yaas (The Golden Spruce) which was illegally felled by Grant Hadwin in 1997, and the White Raven, which has died.

Today, Port Clements and the nearby mouth of the Yakoun River attract visitors intending to fish for steelheads, chinook and other salmon or to go kayaking. There are a few camp and picnic sites as well as hiking trails in and around Port Clements, which also has one gas station, one grocery store, a public library, a Canada Post office, a bar, a museum, a hostel, a grade school, a church and a wharf. Businesses include mechanics, small farmers and forestry contractors.

== Demographics ==
In the 2021 Census of Population conducted by Statistics Canada, Port Clements had a population of 340 living in 181 of its 205 total private dwellings, a change of 20.6% from its 2016 population of 282. With a land area of 13.07 km^{2} (5.05 sq mi), it had a population density of 26.0/km^{2} (67.4/sq mi) in 2021.
