= Slatechuck Creek =

Coordinates: 53°13′27″N 132°14′03″W

Slatechuck Creek is a short but culturally important stream on Graham Island in the Queen Charlotte Islands of the North Coast of British Columbia, Canada. Only 6.7 km in length, it is located on the south flank of the small range including Slatechuck Mountain, to the north of which is Yakoun Lake, the headwaters of the Yakoun River. Its main left tributary, Kagan Creek, is named for Slatechuck Mountain, whose name in the Haida language is Kaagan.

The basin of Slatechuck Creek is the only source in the world of a rare black form of argillite, formerly commonly known as "black slate". It plays an important role as a carving substance in Haida art and only Haida are permitted to quarry for it. "Slatechuck" is a local Chinook Jargon usage combining "slate" with "chuck", a word for water, river, lake.

Anthracite coal and other minerals have been observed in the local geology.

== See also ==
- List of rivers of British Columbia
