= Masset (disambiguation) =

Masset is a village in Haida Gwaii in British Columbia, Canada.

Masset may also refer to the following places in British Columbia:

== Places ==
- Masset Formation, a volcanic formation on Graham Island of Haida Gwaii
- Masset Inlet, a saltwater bay of Graham Island
- Masset Sound, a saltwater inlet of Graham Island

== Other uses ==
- Masset Airport, an airport near the village of Masset
- Masset Water Aerodrome, an aerodrome adjacent to Masset
- CFS Masset, a Canadian Forces station and signals intercept facility near Masset

== See also ==
- Patrick Massett (born 1962), American screenwriter and producer
