= David Christensen =

Canadian film director and producer

David Christensen is an Alberta film director and producer who since October 2007 has been an executive producer with the National Film Board of Canada (NFB) at its Northwest Centre, based in Edmonton.

== Directing ==
His directorial credits include the 2003 NFB-co-produced documentary War Hospital, co-directed with Damien Lewis, and his 2006 dramatic feature debut film, Six Figures. A documentary filmmaker until Six Figures, Christensen prepared for the project by taking a workshop on directing actors with Judith Weston. Six Figures was nominated for the Academy of Canadian Cinema and Television Award for Best Screenplay at the 26th Genie Awards, and was a runner up for the Best Canadian Film Award from the Toronto Film Critics Association.

== Producing ==
As head of the NFB's Edmonton studio, Christensen develops films from across the province of Alberta as well as northern Canada.

In 2015, Christensen produced Guy Maddin and Evan Johnson's feature, The Forbidden Room, and the feature documentary Hadwin's Judgement, based in part on John Vaillant's book The Golden Spruce about Grant Hadwin. The same year, Christensen also developed a short film series to tell the stories of small rural communities across southern Alberta and Saskatchewan, The Grasslands Project.

His recent productions also include Everything Will Be, a 2014 documentary film about the fate of Vancouver's Chinatown, for which he approached Vancouver filmmaker Julia Kwan to direct her first non-fiction film. Other credits include Wiebo's War (executive producer), Vanishing Point (producer/executive producer) and We Were Children (producer/executive producer).

== Other film work ==
He is a co-founder of the Calgary Cinematheque and curated two film programs for the Alberta College of Art and Design.
