= Hadwin (surname) =

Hadwin is a surname. Notable people with the surname include:

- Courtney Hadwin (born 2004) English singer-songwriter
- Grant Hadwin (born 1949), Canadian forest engineer
- Adam Hadwin (born 1987), Canadian professional golfer
- The Hadwins Camping Social influencers

Hadwin is one of the many names that the Normans brought with them when they conquered England in 1066. The name Hadwin came from the Old French name Hardouin, a traditional baptismal name which meant Hardwinnus. As the naming tradition grew in Europe baptismal names began to be introduced in many countries.

The surname Hadwin is mostly found in the USA, Canada and UK.

In the UK, it is most likely found in the English counties of Lancashire, Cumbria (Cumberland/Westmorland) in the North West. These are mostly rural areas.

There around 702 people with this surname in England, 356 in the USA and 56 in Canada.
