= The Golden Spruce =

2005 nonfiction book by John Vaillant

The Golden Spruce: A True Story of Myth, Madness, and Greed
- Front paperback cover art for The Golden Spruce.
- Author: John Vaillant
- Language: English
- Subject: Kiidk'yaas
- Publisher: W. W. Norton & Company
- Publication date: May 17, 2005
- Publication place: Canada
- Media type: Print (hardcover), audiobook, e-book
- Pages: 272
- ISBN: 978-0393058871
- OCLC: 66145134
- Followed by: The Tiger: A True Story of Vengeance and Survival

The Golden Spruce: A True Story of Myth, Madness, and Greed is a book by American author John Vaillant. It was his first book, published in May 2005.

== Background ==
The book is based on a 2002 article Vaillant wrote for The New Yorker.

While researching the book, Vaillant learned that the oral tradition surrounding The Golden Spruce is considered the property of various clans throughout the Pacific Northwest and requires permission to retell. Speaking about the challenge of writing a book where principal characters are absent or dead, Vaillant said, "Virtually everyone leaves a trail behind them in the form of tracks, objects, relationships, official documents, and the memories of others."

== Overview ==
The book tells the story of Kiidk'yaas, or The Golden Spruce, which was a Sitka Spruce tree venerated by the Haida people. The tree itself contained a genetic mutation causing it to appear golden in color. It was felled in Haida Gwaii by forest engineer Grant Hadwin.

From Publishers Weekly:

"The felling of a celebrated giant golden spruce tree in British Columbia's Queen Charlotte Islands takes on a potent symbolism in this probing study of an unprecedented act of eco-vandalism...It is also, in his telling, a land of virtually infinite natural resources overmatched by an even greater human rapaciousness."

== Reception ==
The Golden Spruce won the 2005 Governor General's Awards for non-fiction.

The Sydney Morning Herald described the book as, "A deep-reaching account of the clash between wilderness values, the voracious logging industry, white settlers, and first nations people." The New York Times said the book, "explore[s] the relationship between man and nature with lush language and page-turning suspense." It has drawn comparisons to Silent Spring by Rachel Carson, The Hot Zone by Richard Preston, H is for Hawk by Helen Macdonald and Flash Boys by Michael Lewis.

In 2016, the book was adapted into a feature-length documentary titled Hadwin’s Judgement by filmmaker Sasha Snow. It was the second collaboration between Snow and Vaillant; Snow's 2006 documentary Conflict Tiger was the source of inspiration for Vaillant's 2010 book The Tiger. The film premiered at The Globe Theater in Calgary, Alberta on 22 January 2016.
