= Slatechuck Mountain =

- Location within British Columbia
- Interactive map of Slatechuck Mountain

Highest point
- Coordinates: 53.261666°N 132.2375°W

Geography
- Location: North Coast of British Columbia, Canada
- District: Queen Charlotte Land District
- Topo map: NTS 103F8 Yakoun Lake

Slatechuck Mountain, known as Kaagan in the Haida language, is a summit on south-central Graham Island in Haida Gwaii, formerly known as the Queen Charlotte Islands of the North Coast of British Columbia, Canada. It is located about 9 km west of Daajing Giids (formerly Queen Charlotte City), on Skidegate Inlet, and just south of Yakoun Lake, the island's largest lake, which is the source of the northward-flowing Yakoun River.

Slatechuck Mountain is important in the culture of the Haida people as the source of a rare black form of argillite used in Haida art. Known also as "black slate", this form of argillite occurs nowhere else in the world and only Haida have the right to quarry it. The black argillite occurs only at certain locations on the mountain's slope, above the basin of Slatechuck Creek. The name "Slatechuck" is a local Chinook Jargon usage, combining "slate" with the word for water, river or lake, and is a reference to the creek being where the slate is found.

== Gallery ==
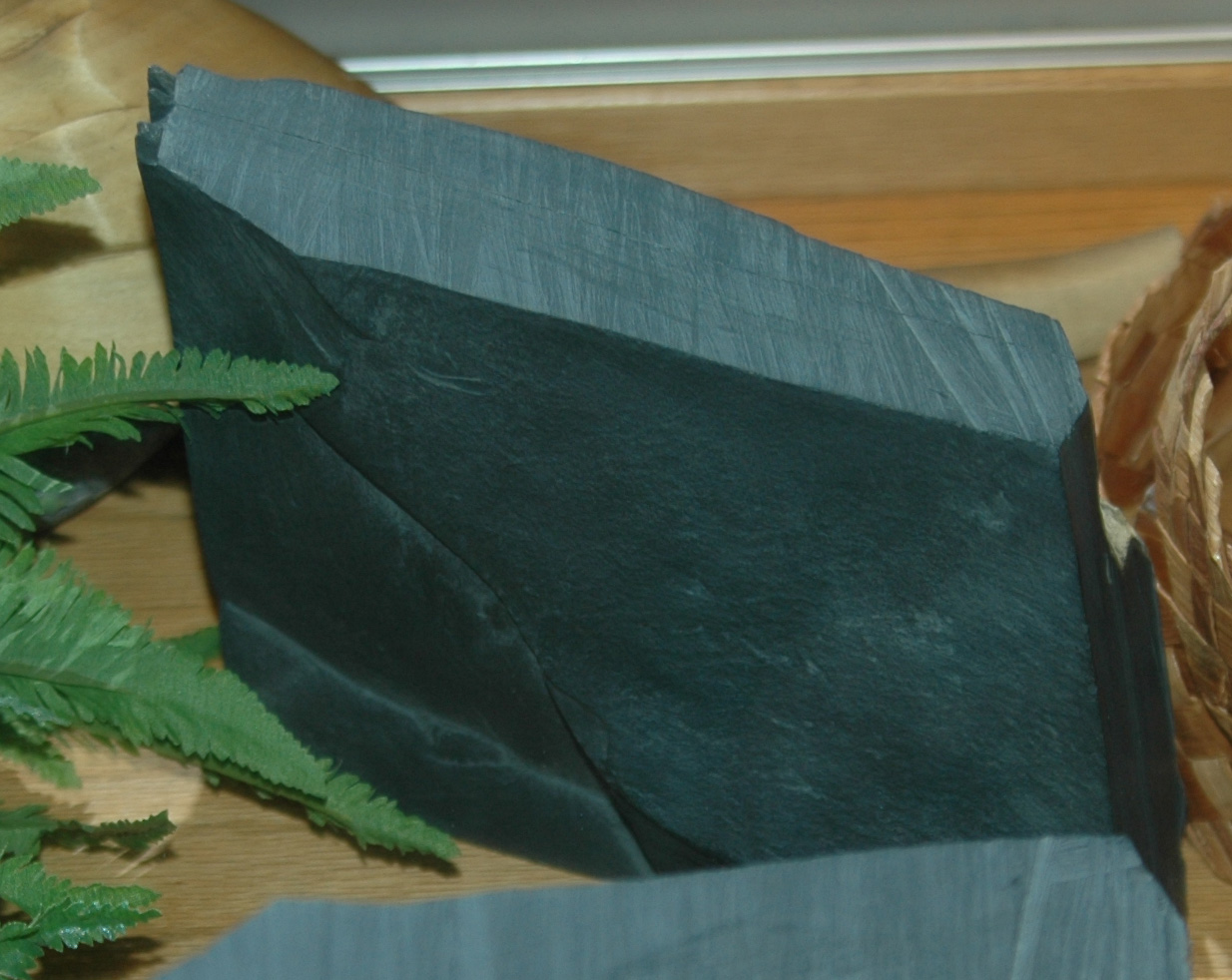
Dark argillite from the area
