= Yakoun River =

- Mouth of the Yakoun River
- Native name: Yaaguun G̱andlee (Haida)

Location
- Country: Canada
- Province: British Columbia
- Region: Haida Gwaii

Physical characteristics
- Source: Yakoun Lake
  - location: Graham Island
  - coordinates: 53°20′27″N 132°15′16″W
  - elevation: 103 m (338 ft)
- Mouth: Masset Inlet
  - location: Yakoun Bay
  - coordinates: 53°39′28″N 132°12′27″W
  - elevation: 0 m (0 ft)
- Length: 58 km (36 mi)
- Basin size: 569 km^{2} (220 sq mi),
- Discharge
  - average: 32.632 m^{3}/s (1,152.4 cu ft/s)

Basin features
- Topo maps: NTS 103F9 Port Clements; NTS 103F8 Yakoun Lake

The Yakoun River (Haida: Yaaguun G̱andlee) is the largest river of Haida Gwaii, in the province of British Columbia, Canada. Located on Graham Island it flows about 58 km (36 mi) from Yakoun Lake north to Masset Inlet, a large saltwater bay located in the heart of the Graham Island and connected to the Pacific Ocean at Dixon Entrance via a long narrow inlet called Masset Sound.

The Yakoun River's watershed covers 550 km^{2} (210 sq mi), and its mean annual discharge is an estimated 32.6 m^{3}/s (1,150 cu ft/s). The mouth of the Yakoun River is located about 3.5 km (2.2 mi) south of Port Clements, 40 km (25 mi) south of Masset, and about 46 km (29 mi) north of Skidegate. It is about 145 km (90 mi) west of Prince Rupert on the mainland. Vancouver is about 800 km (500 mi) to the southeast. The river's watershed's land cover is classified as 63.4% conifer forest, 22.5% shrubland, and small amounts of other cover.

== Course ==
The Yakoun River is located on Graham Island, the northernmost and largest island of the Haida Gwaii archipelago. The river originates at Yakoun Lake, in south-central Graham Island, just north of Slatechuck Mountain and Skidegate Channel. A number of small streams flow into Yakoun Lake, including Delta Creek, Sandstone Creek, Baddeck Creek, and Etheline Creek. Yakoun Lake and its watershed is in the Yaaguun Suu Conservancy.

The Yakoun River exits Yakoun Lake and flows generally north along a twisting path. It collects the tributary streams Brent Creek, Phantom Creek, Ghost Creek, Wilson Creek, King Creek, Drill Creek, Gold Creek, Canyon Creek, Blackbear Creek, Log Crek, Canoe Creek, and Florence Creek. As the river nears its mouth at Masset Inlet it enters the Yaaguun G̱andlaay Conservancy. It empties into Yakoun Bay, a small bay at the southeast end of Masset Inlet, a large saltwater bay located in the heart of the Graham Island.

An estuary at the mouth of Yakoun River serves as habitat for all coastal Pacific salmon species as well as cutthroat and steelhead trout.

== History ==
The Yakoun River has been used by Haida people since time immemorial. Archaeological evidence indicates that the Yakoun River's watershed has been occupied for at least 10,000 years. The Yaaguun G̱andlaay Conservancy at the mouth of the river was home to Haida villages and seasonal camps. There are 25 registered archaeological sites and extensive cultural features, such as remnants of canoes and fish weirs, within the conservancy. It is considered the "River of Life" by the Haida.

Westerners and the Haida made first contact in the late 1700s. For several decades Haida Gwaii was the center of the maritime fur trade, which brought the Haida both technology and disease. Over the century that followed the Haida experienced many epidemics and suffered major population loss, especially as a result of the 1862 Pacific Northwest smallpox epidemic. Areas like the Yakoun River were largely abandoned as the few hundred survivors consolidated in Skidegate and Masset. Since the mid-20th century the Haida have been reclaiming and making use of their traditional territory, such as the Yakoun River.

Kiidk'yaas, a unique gold-coloured sitka spruce known as the "Golden Spruce Tree", considered sacred by the Haida, grew on the west bank of the Yakoun River until 1997 when it was cut down by Grant Hadwin. Kiidk'yaas features prominently in Haida mythology. The site is tied to an ancient Haida story of a village that saw winter during the middle of the summer. Only a little boy and his grandfather survived. The boy did not heed his grandfather's words and turned into a tree.

The Yakoun River's watershed provides the Haida with continuance of traditional cultural uses, such as monumental cedar and cedar bark harvesting, medicinal plant harvesting, hunting, fishing, food gathering, as well as providing a setting for spiritual use and cultural expression through monumental art.

== See also ==
- List of rivers of British Columbia
