= Doug Chapman (stuntman) =

Canadian stunt coordinator, stunt performer and actor

- Other name: Douglas Chapman
- Occupations: Stunt performer, stunt double, actor, stunt co-ordinator
- Years active: 1996–present

Doug Chapman is a stunt coordinator, stunt performer and actor, a member of Stunts Canada, who works in film and television.

== Biography ==
He graduated in 1994 from the California State University, Chico with a Bachelor of Arts in Information and Communication Design in Media Arts.

== Career ==
He has been a stunt double for Kurt Russell, Robert Englund and Christian Slater. He worked on TV shows from The X-Files to Smallville, and films from I, Robot to 300. He has also performed stunts for many commercials, including precision driving for commercials for Honda and Chrysler. Notable acting roles include Sergeant Cole in Stargate Atlantis and Roy Chess in Watchmen. He has continued to work in stunt coordination and stunt performer roles in top TV series and films to date.

Chapman was uncredited for a stunt in the Smallville episode "Splinter", where he was a stunt double for James Marsters. In the DVD commentary, Marsters says of Chapman, "...he was supposed to just land on top of the thing and the wine case and then slowly go down, and he got sent straight through it...that was such a nasty gag... but he was fine man, he's a pro."

In the film Watchmen, Doug performed the first ever bare-skin burn stunt performance in a feature film. In a production video diary on the film website showing some of the preparation for the stunt, Doug quips to the camera, "It's not a good week unless you burn at least a couple of times."

Doug's character in the Industry Works's film Toxin by Tom Raycove - Lt. John Paxton - features as the perspective of a first-person shooter game for smartphones, Toxin: Zombie Annihilation - made by DisruptedLogic.

Chapman's fire burn live on stage at the 2007 World Stunt Awards was used as a front page banner for the 2014 website.

== Award nominations ==
He was nominated for a Taurus World Stunt Award for Best Fire Stunt in 2004 for a stunt performed for the film Freddy vs. Jason (2003). He doubled for Robert Englund as Freddy Krueger in a full body burn and wire stunt. In the DVD production commentaries, Englund said of him, "I've a great stunt double on this, and Doug's really making me look good."

He was nominated for a Leo Award in 2013 for Best Stunt Coordination in a Motion Picture for Assault on Wall Street.

== Filmography ==
Year	Film	Role
1996	Streetgun	Warehouse Worker #2; Stunt performer
1996	Carpool	Stunt performer
1996	Mother, May I Sleep With Danger?	Stunt performer
1997	Breaking the Surface: The Greg Louganis Story	Klaus Dibiasi; Stunt performer
1997	Viper: Out From Oblivion	Simpkins
1997	Silencing Mary	Stunt Double for Kirby Morrow
1998	Voyage of Terror	Stunt performer
1998	Misbegotten	Stunt performer
1998	Wrongfully Accused	Stunt performer
1998	Disturbing Behaviour	Stunt performer
1998	Rupert's Land	Stunt performer
1998	Futuresport	Stunt performer
1998	Don't Look Down	Stunt double for Terry Kinney
1998	Perfect Little Angels	Stunt performer
1998	The Outer Limits: To Tell the Truth	Stunt double for Gregory Harrison
1999	Fatal Error	Stunt double for David Lewis
1999	Can of Worms	Stunt performer
1999	Atomic Train	Stunt performer
1999	Freeway II: Confessions of a Trickbaby	Stunt performer
1999	Y2K	Stunt performer
2000	Mission to Mars	stunt double for Peter Outerbridge
2000	Trixie	stunt double for Dermot Mulroney
2000	Scary Movie	Stunt performer
2000	The Man Who Used to Be Me	stunt double for William Devane
2000	Blood	Stunt performer
2000	Just Deal	Stunt performer
2001	The Stickup	Stunt performer
2001	Valentine	Stunt performer
2001	Head Over Heels	Stunt performer
2001	Los Luchadores	Stunt double
2001	3000 Miles To Graceland	Stunt double for Kurt Russell
2001	Mindstorm	Stunt performer
2001	Love and Treason	Stunt performer
2001	Along Came a Spider	Stunt double for Michael Wincott
2001	Replicant	stunt double for Michael Rooker
2001	Class Warfare	Stunt performer
2001	Return to Cabin by the Lake	Stunt performer
2001	Dark Water	Truck driver
2001	Out Cold	Stunt performer
2002	My Brother's Keeper	Stunt performer
2002	Dead in a Heartbeat	Stunt performer
2002	Greenmail	Stunt performer
2002	Dead Heat	Stunt performer
2002	Extreme Ops	Stunt double for Devon Sawa
2002	Jeremiah: Things Left Unsaid	stunt double for Alex Zahara
2003	Final Destination 2	Stunt performer
2003	House of the Dead	Stunt performer
2003	John Doe: Psychic Connection	Uniformed Cop
2003	Agent Cody Banks	Stunt performer
2003	The Core	Stunt double for Tcheky Karyo
2003	X2	Stunt performer
2003	Freddy vs. Jason	Stunt double for Robert Englund
2003	Elf	Stunt performer
2003	Scary Movie 3	Stunt performer
2003	Smallville: Magnetic	Deputy
2003	Paycheck	Stunt performer
2004	The Thing Below	Stunt performer
2004	The Collector: The Ice Skater	Stunt performer
2004	Scooby Doo 2: Monsters Unleashed	Stunt performer
2004	Walking Tall	Stunt double for Ryan Robbins
2004	10.5	Stunt performer
2004	The Chronicles of Riddick	Stunt performer
2004	The Collector: The Prosecutor	Guard #1
2004	White Chicks	Stunt performer
2004	I, Robot	Stunt performer
2004	Catwoman	Stunt performer
2004	The Dead Zone: Speak Now	Angry husband of bridesmaid
2005	Smallville: Splinter	Stunt double for James Marsters
2005	Smallville: Lexmas	Stunt double for Kenneth Welsh
2005	Blade: Trinity	Stunt performer
2005	Alone In The Dark	Stunt double for Christian Slater
2005	Fantastic Four	Stunt performer Fireman
2005	Chaos	Stunt double for Jason Statham
2006	Underworld: Evolution	Stunt double for John Mann
2006	Stargate Atlantis: Michael	Sergeant Cole
2006	A Little Thing Called Murder	Stunt coordinator
2006	Scary Movie 4	Stunt performer
2006	X-Men: The Last Stand	Stunt performer
2006	Snakes on a Plane	Stunt performer
2006	Fido	Stunt double
2006	300	Stunt performer
2007	In the Name of the King: A Dungeon Siege Tale	Stunt double for Jason Statham
2007	Code Name: The Cleaner	Stunt performer Agent #2
2007	Painkiller Jane: Toy Soldiers	Federal Agent
2007	Seed	Stunt performer Guard #3
2007	Traveler: The Tells	Murden
2007	Battle in Seattle	Stunt double for Martin Henderson
2007	Martian Child	Stunt performer
2007	Aliens vs. Predator: Requiem	Stunt performer
2008	Ace of Hearts	Stunt coordinator
2008	Shred	Stunt coordinator stunt performer (snowmobile driver)
2008	The Day the Earth Stood Still	Stunt performer Army medic
2008	The Betrayed	Henchman
2008	Beyond Loch Ness	Stunt double for Paul McGillion
2008	The Andromeda strain	Stunt performer
2008	Far Cry	Stunt performer, Mercenary Russell
2009	Watchmen	Stunt coordinator (Canada); Roy Chess; Stunt double for Stephen McHattie; Stunt performer
2009	I Love You Beth Cooper	Stunt double for Jared Keeso
2009	Merlin and the Book of Beasts	Stunt performer - guard #1
2009	Fireball	Stunt double
2009	Rampage	stunt performer (police officer)
2009	Defying Gravity	stunt performer
2009	Revenge of the Boarding School Dropouts	Stunt coordinator 2nd Unit Director stunt performer (snowboard rep)
2009	Case 39	stunt performer (dock worker, rescue diver)
2009	The Hole	Normal Dad
2009	V (2009 TV series)	V Guard; Stunt double for Scott Wolf stunt performer
2010	Hot Tub Time Machine	Stunt coordinator
2010	Smokin' Aces 2: Assassins' Ball	Agent O'Keefe
2010	Life Unexpected	Stunt coordinator (cover days)
2010	Inception	Stunt performer
2010	Diary of a Wimpy Kid	Stunt performer
2011	Final Destination 5	Stunt performer (driver)
2011	Somnolence	Canterra
2011	Rise of the Planet of the Apes	Stunt performer (Military police); Stunt coordinator (cover days)
2011	Doomsday Prophecy	Military officer
2012	Toxin	Lt. John Paxton
2012	Dawn Rider	Chase
2012	Shadowplay	Specialist; Stunt coordinator
2012	True Justice	Stunt coordinator, Stunt actor, stunt double
2012	Arrow	Stunt performer (27 episodes 2012-14)
2012	Hell on Wheels	Stunt performer
2012	Continuum	BS Cop #2
2012	Earth's Final Hours	Agent
2013	Assault on Wall Street	Stunt Coordinator
2013	Arrow	Stunt driver (2 episodes)
2013-2015	Motive	Stunt Coordinator (33 episodes); Dr Hanlon; Bryce Conroy
2015	Hadwin's Judgement	Grant Hadwin
2016	Star Trek Beyond	Sir Olden
2016-18	Travelers (TV series)	stunt coordinator, and also plays "Luca"
2021	Resident Alien (TV series)	Man who falls off cliff
2022	Peacemaker (TV series)	stunt performer
2023	The Last of Us (TV series)	stunts
2024	Zodiac: Signs of the Apocalypse	Agent Tyler
