= Zodiac: Signs of the Apocalypse =

2014 Canadian Television Film

- Genre: Action, science fiction
- Written by: David Sanderson
- Directed by: (William) David Hogan (as W. D. Hogan)
- Starring: Christopher Lloyd; Joel Gretsch; Reilly Dolman
- Music by: Michael Neilson
- Country of origin: Canada
- Original language: English

Production
- Executive producers: Tom Berry; Lisa M. Hansen; Paul Hertzberg
- Producer: Gilles LaPlante
- Cinematography: Anthony Metchie
- Editor: Christopher A. Smith
- Running time: 90 minutes
- Production companies: CineTel Films; Zodiac Pictures

Original release
- Network: Syfy
- Release: August 8, 2014

Zodiac: Signs of the Apocalypse is a 2014 Canadian science fiction disaster television film directed for Syfy by (William) David Hogan as W. D. Hogan.

== Plot ==
When archaeologists unearth a 2,000-year-old astrology carving in a Peruvian lead mine, global cataclysms start to destroy the globe: explosive meteor storms, tsunamis, lightning storms, lava geysers and giant waterspouts erupt everywhere, each disaster corresponding to a specific sign of the zodiac. While the artifact discovered in the dig falls into the wrong hands of a government agency that kills to hide the secret, a divorced university professor, his estranged son and two scientists race against time and carnage to decipher the symbols on the artifact as a prediction of the coming of Nibiru, a mythical ninth planet believed to bring the Apocalypse when it crosses the sun. They realize that the only way to avert the end of the world is to recover the object and return it to its rightful place by activating an ancient civilization's Armageddon machine.

== Cast ==
- Joel Gretsch as Professor Neil Martin
- Emily Holmes as Kathryn Keen
- Reilly Dolman as Colin Martin
- Andrea Brooks as Sophie
- Aaron Douglas as Agent Woodward
- Ben Cotton as Marty Fitzgerald
- Christopher Lloyd as Harry Setag
- Douglas Chapman as Agent Tyler
- Russell Roberts as Dr. Bowles
- Raf Rogers as Joel
- Jessica Storm Smith as Jennifer
- Matthew Linnitt as Pilot
- Jeffrey Klassen as Agent
