= Fire Weather =

2023 book by John Vaillant

Fire Weather: On the Front Lines of a Burning World
- Author: John Vaillant
- Language: English
- Publisher: Knopf
- Publication date: 2023
- Pages: 432
- ISBN: 9781524732851

Fire Weather: A True Story from a Hotter World, also published as Fire Weather: On the Front Lines of a Burning World and Fire Weather: The Making of a Beast, is a 2023 book by Canadian-American journalist John Vaillant. It was published by Knopf, a subsidiary of Penguin Random House. The book details the 2016 Fort McMurray wildfire which led to the evacuation of more than 88,000 residents of Fort McMurray, in the province of Alberta, Canada and the destruction of much of the town.

The book was a finalist for the 2023 National Book Award for Nonfiction as well as the winner of the 2023 Baillie Gifford Prize for Non-fiction. The book was also selected as one of the notable books of 2023 by The New York Times: ”Vaillant has a chillingly serious message: This is the inevitable result of climate change, and it will happen again and again.” It was selected as one of the must-read books of 2023 by Time as a chronicle of “the intertwining histories of North America’s oil and gas industries and the study of climate change.” The work was a finalist for the 2024 Pulitzer Prize for General Nonfiction.

== Narrative ==
The book details how conditions in Alberta at the time were ideal for such a large fire. These included unseasonably warm temperatures (in May 2016 temperatures were in the high 80s Fahrenheit, almost 30 degrees above average), strong winds, low humidity and dry conditions. The dry conditions may have been due to much lower than expected snowfall in the preceding two winters. The fire initially formed on the outskirts of town, in a nearby boreal forest and was discovered by local authorities shortly thereafter. However, the mayor, fire chief and other municipal leaders were slow to act and an evacuation was not started until the fire had entered the town. Despite the frantic and haphazard evacuation, there were no deaths directly attributed to the fire. The fire was not contained until the following month, and it remained smoldering and in a reduced state until it was finally extinguished in August 2017. The fire, which was first spotted in the outskirts of town on May 1, was initially designated MWF-009 by firefighters. However as the fire began to encroach upon the town and later engulf it, becoming more powerful than multiple atomic bombs, hotter than the surface of Venus, and becoming so large that it created its own weather patterns in the process, residents began to refer to the conflagration as "the Beast".

Valliant also expands upon the many factors that may have led to such an uncharacteristically dangerous wildfire, exploring themes such as the ecosystem of the Taiga, the mechanism of combustion, the combustibility of modern petroleum based products such as furniture or clothes, the history of environmental damage in Canada and Alberta, and climate change.

== Reception ==
In a mixed review, writing for the Washington Post, Becca Rothfeld felt that Vaillant's digressions from the main narrative regarding the fire were superfluous and detracted from the main tone of the book. Rothfeld stated: "I could have done without quite so many forays into the origins of climate science or quite so many reminders that the admittedly colossal mismanagement in Fort McMurray resembles the no less colossal mismanagement ongoing worldwide. Lectures about how officials in both local and global cases have turned a blind eye to impending catastrophe serve only to reiterate the obvious — and, worse, to transform an account of a painfully particular horror into a generic admonition. “Fire Weather” fails when it trades in familiar warnings, which are easily relegated to the dustbin of the mind." However, Rothfeld stated that the book "...succeeds when it concretizes the unimaginable in terms that seize readers by the throat." Writing for The New York Times, in a mixed review, journalist David Enrich also felt that the author's digressions into background topics that supplemented the main narrative detracted from the work's gripping depiction of the wildfire and the townspeople's plight, stating: "It is a gripping yarn, though the storytelling is at times slowed by Vaillant’s wanderings. There’s a painstaking history of the use of bitumen over the millenniums. There’s a discourse on the quasi-spiritual nature of fire in its many forms, which eventually meanders into a meditation on oxygen and human breathing." Enrich also criticized the book for lacking a human element to the tragedy, stating: "With a few poignant exceptions... “Fire Weather” lacks many memorable human characters." Writing for The Guardian, Tim Adams stated that the book was "meticulous in its detail, both human and geological in its scale, and often shocking in its conclusions."
