= Harris Creek Sitka Spruce =

Coordinates: 48.67921°N 124.21418°W

Large sitka spruce tree at Harris Creek on Vancouver Island

The Harris Creek Sitka Spruce is a large Sitka spruce tree, about 4 metres (13 ft) in diameter, near the creek bed of Harris Creek, off the Pacific Marine Road between Port Renfrew, BC and Honeymoon Bay, BC on Vancouver Island, in British Columbia. Although it is not the largest sitka spruce on Vancouver Island, it is easily accessible and has become a famous tree along the Pacific Marine Loop going from Victoria, BC, through Port Renfrew, Lake Cowichan, and Duncan, BC and returning to Victoria over the Malahat Drive (a portion of the Trans-Canada Highway). It is approximately 80 metres (260 ft) tall.

The Pacific Marine Road runs along Harris Creek for part of its way between Port Renfrew and Honeymoon Bay. There is a small sign for the tree on the right-hand side of the road, when driving northeast, about 20 kilometres (12 mi) from Port Renfrew, or 8 kilometres (5.0 mi) from Lizard lake. There is enough area to pull over and park, and a short, wheelchair-accessible path leads to the tree.

The tree is easily accessible due to the paving a logging road (now part of Pacific Marine Road). It has become well-known: hikers going by on the Harris Creek Main trail are recommended by trail guide books to make a short detour to visit it.

The tree is in a second growth forest and is much taller than the surrounding trees. The original old-growth forest was first logged in the 1893, yet this individual tree was spared. The tree is very large at the base as it flares out above ground into the root system. Many of its branches are covered in moss. The tree is surrounded by a fence to protect its root system from excessive trampling.

Logging in this area was permanently restricted by a 2012 vote.

Two groves of large, gnarly western red cedar trees, known as the Avatar Grove, are also nearby, closer to Port Renfrew.

== See also ==
- List of individual trees
