= Reilly Dolman =

Canadian actor (b. 1988)

- Born: February 29, 1988 (age 38); Vancouver, British Columbia, Canada
- Occupation: Actor
- Height: 6 ft (183 cm)
- Children: 1

Reilly Dolman (born February 29, 1988) is a Canadian actor best known for his main role as Philip Pearson in the series Travelers. As of 2018, he lives in Vancouver, British Columbia.

== Career ==
Dolman's interest in acting was sparked during a digital media class in high school. He began his career in 2007 and has had a several minor and recurring roles in television series including Bionic Woman, Supernatural, and Stargate Universe and in movies. In 2016, he landed the main role of Philip Pearson in the Netflix series Travelers. The series, set in a post-apocalyptic future, follows operatives who transfer their consciousness into individuals in the 21st century to prevent societal collapse. Dolman played a recurring role in the series, Billy the Kid portraying as Dick Brewer 2022–2024 as well as guest roles in series such as Tracker, Charmed, and The Terror.

== Filmography ==
=== Film ===
Year	Title	Role	Notes
2010	Percy Jackson & the Lightning Thief	College Buddy	
2010	Flicka 2	Jake	TV Movie
2010	A Brother's Love	Richard Perkins	
2010	Goblin	Kyle	TV movie
2010	Bond of Silence	James	TV movie
2011	Super Storm	Lawson	TV movie
2013	Missed Connections	John	Short film
2021	Poisoned in Paradise: A Martha's Vineyard Mystery	Glen Eads	TV Movie

=== Television ===
Year	Title	Role	Notes
2007	Bionic Woman	Brennan	Episode: "The List"
2010	The Troop	Brian	Episode: "Speed"
2011	Stargate Universe	Jason	2 episodes
2013	Romeo Killer:The Chris Porco Story	Brody McAllister	TV movie
2013	Scarecrow	Daevon	TV movie
2013	The Tomorrow People	Man under Mask	Episode: "Thanatos"
2009–2014	Supernatural	Connor/Lunchroom Jock	2 episodes
2014	Rush	Noah	Episode: "We Are Family"
2014	Zodiac: Signs of the Apocalypse	Colin Martin	TV movie
2016	Frontier	Boy Soldier	Episode: "A Kingdom Unto Itself"
2016–2018	Travelers	Philip Pearson	Main role
2019	The InBetween	Max Geoghan	Guest Star
2019	The Terror	Marlon Harris	Guest Star
2021	Charmed	Omon	Guest Star
2022–2024	Billy the Kid	Dick Brewer	Main Role
2025	Tracker	Casey Hale	Episode "Shades of Gray"
