= Travelers (TV series) =

2016 science fiction TV series

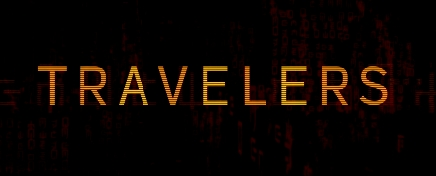
- Genre: Science fiction
- Created by: Brad Wright
- Starring: Eric McCormack; MacKenzie Porter; Nesta Cooper; Jared Abrahamson; Reilly Dolman; Patrick Gilmore
- Composer: Adam Lastiwka
- Countries of origin: Canada; United States
- Original language: English
- No. of seasons: 3
- No. of episodes: 34

Production
- Producer: Eric McCormack
- Production locations: Vancouver, British Columbia, Canada
- Running time: 45 minutes
- Production company: Peacock Alley Entertainment

Original release
- Network: Showcase (Canada); Netflix (international)
- Release: October 17, 2016 – December 14, 2018

Travelers is a science fiction television series created by Brad Wright, starring Eric McCormack, Mackenzie Porter, Jared Abrahamson, Nesta Cooper, Reilly Dolman, and Patrick Gilmore. The first two seasons were co-produced by Netflix and Canadian specialty channel Showcase. After the second season, Netflix became the sole commissioning broadcaster and worldwide distributor. The show premiered in Canada on October 17, 2016, and worldwide on December 23, 2016. A second season followed in 2017, and a third season was released on December 14, 2018. In February 2019, the series was cancelled.

== Premise ==
In a post-apocalyptic future, thousands of special operatives are tasked with preventing the collapse of society. These operatives, known as "travelers", have their consciousnesses sent back in time and transferred into the "host" body of present-day individuals who are about to die, minimizing unexpected impact on the future. The transfer requires the exact location of the target, made possible by 21st-century smartphones and GPS, providing time, elevation, latitude, and longitude (TELL) coordinates that are archived for use in the future. No transfer can be safely made to a time prior to one already performed.

Using social media and public records, travelers learn about their hosts, each maintaining the host's pre-existing life as cover for the rest of their lives. In teams of five, they carry out missions dictated by the Director, an artificial intelligence quantum computer program monitoring the timeline from the future. The goal of the missions is to save the planet from a series of catastrophic events. The Director can communicate with travelers through prepubescent children, who, unlike adults, can safely be animated by the Director for a short time without risking death.

=== Protocols ===
Travelers have several protocols to protect the timeline:

- Protocol 1: The mission comes first.
- Protocol 2: Leave the future in the past.
- Protocol 3: Don't take a life, don't save a life, unless otherwise directed. Do not interfere.
- Protocol 4: Do not reproduce.
- Protocol 5: In the absence of direction, maintain your host's life.
- Protocol 6: Do not communicate with other known travelers outside of your team unless sanctioned by the Director.

The team historians have an additional secret protocol involving the periodic updates they receive concerning "historic information relative to [their] team's role in the Grand Plan". It is a sub-protocol of Protocol 2:

- Protocol 2H: This forbids the revelation about the existence of the updates "with anyone, ever".

The Director can invoke three other protocols in special situations:

- Protocol Alpha: temporarily suspends all other protocols when a critical mission must be completed at all costs
- Protocol Epsilon: can be invoked when traveler archives are threatened
- Protocol Omega: permanently suspends all other protocols when the Director abandons the travelers because the future has either been fixed or deemed impossible to fix

== Cast ==
=== Main ===
- Eric McCormack as Grant MacLaren (Traveler 3468), the team's leader, who assumes the life of a married FBI special agent
- MacKenzie Porter as Marcy Warton (Traveler 3569), the team's medic, who assumes the life of an intellectually disabled woman
- Nesta Cooper as Carly Shannon (Traveler 3465), the team's tactician, who assumes the life of a stay-at-home single mother
- Jared Abrahamson as Trevor Holden (Traveler 0115), the team's engineer and one of the oldest humans ever, who assumes the life of a high school athlete
- Reilly Dolman as Philip Pearson (Traveler 3326), the team's historian, who assumes the life of a college-age heroin addict
- Patrick Gilmore as David Mailer, Marcy's social worker and later romantic interest

=== Recurring ===
- J. Alex Brinson as Jeff Conniker, Carly's abusive police officer ex-boyfriend and the father of her son, later Traveler 5416 and, briefly, Traveler 001
- Leah Cairns as Kathryn "Kat" MacLaren, Grant's wife who works as an interior designer
- Enrico Colantoni as Vincent Ingram, the first traveler (Traveler 001) whose host was supposed to die on September 11, 2001
- Chad Krowchuk as Simon, Traveler 004, a specialist who set up the travelers' communications system in the 21st, then was deceived into building consciousness transfer technology for Vincent
- Arnold Pinnock as Walt Forbes, MacLaren's partner at the FBI, later a member of the Faction posing as Traveler 4112 and, subsequently, Traveler 4991
- Jennifer Spence as Grace Day, Trevor's high school counselor and later Traveler 0027, a programmer who helped create the Director
- Ian Tracey as Ray Green, Philip's lawyer and later friend, a compulsive gambler
- Kimberley Sustad as Joanne Yates, MacLaren's new FBI partner who is later assigned by the FBI director to act as the liaison between the FBI and the Traveler program

=== Guest ===
==== Introduced in season 1 ====
- David Lewis as Major Gleason, a hotheaded military officer
- Kyra Zagorsky as Dr. Delaney, a brilliant scientist who developed a method for collecting and storing antimatter
- Garry Chalk as Detective Gower, a police detective who suspects Philip of criminal activity
- Kristine Cofsky as Victoria Boyd, Traveler 3185, who assumes the life of a police officer
- Giacomo Baessato as Private Wilson, a soldier who works for Gleason
- Alyssa Lynch as Rene Bellamy, a high school student and Trevor's girlfriend
- Tom McBeath as Ellis, Traveler 0014, a programmer who assumes the life of a farmer
- Eileen Pedde as Mom, a traveler who assumes the role of a mother in a family of four
- Yasmeene Ball as Charlotte, a misfire traveler historian; later a traveler assassin
- Glynis Davies as Jacqueline, a representative of Child Protective Services
- Melanie Papalia as Beth, an FBI analyst working for MacLaren
- Karin Konoval as Bloom, Traveler 0117, a high ranking traveler engineer
- Louis Ferreira as Rick Hall, a jaded traveler team leader
- Douglas Chapman as Luca Shun, Traveler 2587, a member of Hall's team
- Jason Gray-Stanford as Aaron Donner, Traveler 4022 (and later Traveler 4024), a bomber
- William MacDonald as Gary Holden, Trevor's father
- Teryl Rothery as Patricia Holden, Trevor's mother
- Dylan Playfair as Kyle, a friend of Trevor, later historian Traveler 5532
- Gerard Plunkett as Ted Bishop, a congressman
- Matthew Kevin Anderson as Derek, Traveler D13, a traveler doctor assigned to save MacLaren
- David Raynolds, introduced as foster child Aleksander (episode of the same name), returns as a guest in Season 3's "Protocol 3"

==== Introduced in season 2 ====
- Stephen Lobo as Agent Wakefield, a faction member posing as a traveler who is later overwritten by the Director
- Paloma Kwiatkowski as Abigail Paris, a young woman that Trevor befriends
- Lee Majdoub as Dr. Barker, a doctor with a romantic interest in Marcy
- Sunita Prasad as Blair, David's girlfriend
- Melissa Roxburgh as Carrie, Travelers 5001–5007, a skydiver assigned to prevent the assassination of MacLaren's team
- Amanda Tapping as Katrina Perrow, Traveler 001's psychologist, who is later taken over by 001 before the Director can overwrite him
- Stephanie Bennett as Jenny, Traveler 4514, a traveler assigned to help Philip with his heroin addiction
- Josh Blacker as Agent Callahan, a Traveler who assumes the life of an FBI agent

==== Introduced in season 3 ====
- Benjamin Ratner as Ivon Teslia, a computer engineer responsible for the creation of the artificial intelligence (AI) Ilsa
- Rebecca Shoichet as the voice of Ilsa, the AI hosting the Director in the 21st century
- Magda Apanowicz as Dawn, a Faction traveler loyal to Traveler 001
- Christopher Heyerdahl as Andrew Graeme (Traveler 7189), a mathematician whose host is discovered to be a serial killer
- Veronika Hadrava as Katrina (Traveler A18), an Archivist
- Karen Holness as Samantha Burns, a physicist responsible for designing the singularity engine

== Episodes ==
Season	Episodes	Originally released		
Season	Episodes	First released	Last released	Network
1	12	October 17, 2016	January 2, 2017	Showcase/Netflix
2	12	October 16, 2017	December 18, 2017	Showcase/Netflix
3	10	December 14, 2018		Netflix

=== Season 1 (2016–17) ===
The first season premiered on Netflix on December 23, 2016, before its final two episodes aired on Showcase.

No. overall	No. in season	Title	Directed by	Written by	Original release date
1	1	"Travelers"	Nick Hurran	Brad Wright	October 17, 2016
In 2018, four unconnected people undergo sudden personality changes at what would have been their moments of death: Marcy, a young, intellectually disabled woman, is assaulted but fights off her attackers and is no longer impaired; high-schooler Trevor concedes a mixed martial arts fight after being overmatched; heroin-addicted college student Philip drops his syringe just as his roommate injects a fatal overdose; and young mother Carly stares down her baby's abusive father. FBI agent MacLaren tracks their subsequent communication and confronts them; they reveal that they are among thousands of time travelers sent from the future to avert a global crisis and that MacLaren was to die that night while pursuing a murderer they have already killed. MacLaren is taken over by a fifth traveler, who is to be the team's leader.
2	2	"Protocol 6"	Andy Mikita	Gillian Muller	October 24, 2016
The team steals antimatter from a military convoy to prevent an explosion that would kill thousands. The material's intended recipient is a new traveler who fails to prevent his host's suicide, forcing the team to improvise. After failing to upgrade their containment device, the team returns the antimatter to its origin facility. They form a tenuous alliance with Dr. Delaney, who produced the antimatter. She opposes Major Gleason's ambitions to weaponize antimatter, although history records her as being complicit. MacLaren informs Delaney that they will return soon. Philip retains his host's heroin addiction. MacLaren meets his wife, Kat, but also resumes a preexisting relationship with Carly. Marcy works to build trust with a confused David.
3	3	"Aleksander"	Andy Mikita	Tara Armstrong & Mika Collins	October 31, 2016
Philip obsesses over the lives the team is forbidden to save, writing the names and time, elevation, latitude, and longitude (TELL) coordinates of all potential candidates on the warehouse wall. He secretly tips off the FBI to prevent killings. He leads the team to rescue abducted child Aleksander Andrieko before his murder, falsely claiming it as a mission from the Director. As a messenger, Aleksander exposes the ruse. MacLaren decides to abandon the "mission", but Philip refuses, drawing his weapon. Aleksander is saved, his captors are killed, and Philip survives a gunshot wound; Marcy reveals his heroin addiction to the others, and plans to wean him. Jeff investigates the assault on Marcy, and detects the personality changes. David covers for her. The team adjusts to the 21st-century's contrast with the scarcity of their native era.
4	4	"Hall"	Martin Wood	Pat Smith	November 7, 2016
MacLaren and Forbes stake out a criminal transaction that becomes a shootout. MacLaren's team is directed to assist an older traveler team: the incident's survivors, whose leader, Rick Hall, reveals that the deal was the assigned transfer of a device with a Russian traveler team. MacLaren is shocked by the violence between teams and by Hall's jadedness. Hall's teammates, Carter and Luca, are both dying, but Marcy saves Luca by transfusing Carter's blood; Marcy suspects Luca is her brother due to his suffering from night terrors. Hall demands that he become the leader of a merged team, and demands MacLaren kill Forbes to prevent their exposure. MacLaren and Forbes arrest Hall and Luca, and the team transfers the device. Trevor quits football to focus on his grades, but is grounded. Ray demands more gambling information from Philip. Carly rebukes Jeff, who harasses Marcy. Carly and MacLaren sleep together.
5	5	"Room 101"	Martin Wood	Brad Wright	November 14, 2016
A family of four are about to die in a car crash when the mother, father, and son become travelers. Charlotte, the daughter, retains her identity when the team's historian's transfer misfires, so MacLaren sends her to stay with her grandparents until her "family" completes their mission. Trevor, Carly, Marcy, and Philip are abducted and interrogated about the future until Carly kills their guard. David alerts MacLaren when Marcy does not come home; MacLaren and Officer Boyd find and rescue the team. MacLaren was forced to cancel his team's mission with the family team, and Carly speculates this was their unidentified captor's goal.
6	6	"Helios 685"	Helen Shaver	Rebecca Hales	November 21, 2016
Travelers transfer into a cult preparing for mass suicide. MacLaren's team, the cult, and many other travelers, including senior engineer Bloom, meet at the antimatter facility. Bloom reveals that the future has been subtly rewritten and is not as united as it once was. Dosed with antitoxin, they release a toxic cloud to force a local evacuation. Gleason interrogates Delaney until MacLaren returns her to the facility and explains the nature of travelers. Gleason discovers Delaney's escape and prepares to return to her lab. Using the antimatter to power an x-ray laser, the travelers intend to deflect asteroid Helios 685, saving millions of lives and preventing the environmental catastrophes and devastating wars that led to their dark future. Deflecting Helios has been the Director's main goal, even though it could possibly prevent the travelers' own births in the future. Gleason leads an assault, killing most of the cult travelers and Bloom before she can fire the laser. However, travelers transfer into his soldiers and eventually into him, sacrificing themselves to complete the mission. The traveler within Gleason fires the laser while MacLaren and his team save Delaney from the antimatter explosion on Bloom's orders. MacLaren is unsure of the mission's success, as his team remains in the present.
7	7	"Protocol 5"	Helen Shaver	SB Edwards & Ashley Park & Pat Smith & Jason Whiting	November 28, 2016
Resuming their hosts' lives, the team suffer paranoia and hallucinations of their future pre-Travel lives, side effects of the antitoxin. MacLaren's coworkers hold a surprise party for his 15th anniversary with the FBI. Kat confronts him about lying to Forbes; he seduces her, but she is still certain he is cheating. During their lovemaking, MacLaren hallucinates that Kat is a woman with very short hair, with Carly's number (3465) tattooed on her neck. After Rene attempts to shoplift some clothes with Trevor and another friend, Trevor confronts the two outside, in an alley. During a fight between Trevor and the other guy, Trevor possibly experiences a slippage of time, where his friend is able to connect with a punch. This will later develop into Trevor's diagnosis of temporal aphasia. Their intimacy growing, David reluctantly helps Marcy perform surgery on herself to prevent seizures. Carly rebuffs a representative of Child Protective Services. Trevor reins in his host's delinquency, and he and Renee meditate. Ray takes Philip to a twelve-step meeting for drug addicts and gets him a pet turtle to care for. Trevor and Philip learn the team has a new mission.
8	8	"Donner"	Will Waring	Ashley Park & Pat Smith	December 5, 2016
A suicide bomber and his victims are set to become travelers, but the bomb explodes and only Donner, the bomber, survives. Devastated by his failure, Donner tries to betray the traveler program to the authorities, but the entire hearing is populated by travelers who hold a trial and convict Donner of treason. Donner is overwritten by a new traveler, who must serve Donner's prison sentence, and reports that things in the future are getting worse despite the changes enacted by Traveler teams in the 21st. Luca approaches Donner in prison, implying that he has lost faith in the Director. Ken, David's boss, believes David's relationship with Marcy is inappropriate. Upon meeting Marcy, he believes she has defrauded the system. Marcy saves David's job by repaying her benefits. Grace, Trevor's guidance counselor, and Jacqueline, Carly's social worker, genuinely care about them, respectively. Grace tries to help Trevor with his academics, and Jacqueline promises that she will not let the system fail Carly and her child. Philip discovers that gambling outcomes are deviating slightly from the historic record.
9	9	"Bishop"	Will Waring	Amanda Smith	December 12, 2016
After asking Marcy to move out, David admits he cannot bear to be without her. She tells him she is dying, and they kiss. Trevor tries to connect with his father. Jeff files assault charges, preventing Carly from finding a job. She asks him to take the baby for an afternoon, unaware he has tipped Kat off to Carly's relationship with MacLaren. Under orders, a traveler murders her host's Cabinet-member husband, and instructs MacLaren to board a flight as Congressman Bishop's seatmate. In flight, MacLaren learns he is to activate a stasis field to save himself and Bishop, while all others aboard will die in a crash. MacLaren discovers Kat followed him on board, believing she would witness his infidelity. He instructs Kat and Bishop to use the stasis device, and attempts to survive impact unaided, using only Philip's knowledge of the crash. At the crash site, the team resuscitate Kat and Bishop, and Bishop is overwritten. To Carly's dismay, MacLaren is taken away by traveler paramedics before the team can reach him.
10	10	"Kathryn"	Andy Mikita	Jason Whiting & SB Edwards	December 19, 2016
Marcy erases Kat's memory of the crash and of the preceding day, and stages her home to make it appear as if she had too much to drink the night before. Philip removes MacLaren's car from the airport, but Forbes believes it is theft. Carly extracts Philip, while Forbes and Kat search for MacLaren. An advanced traveler medical team treats MacLaren with nanites to repair his massive internal damage. Trevor undergoes a painful procedure to grow a transplant heart for MacLaren. Unconscious, MacLaren experiences memories of his host's life with Kat. He discovers that they were deeply in love, and that she very much wanted to have children. She did not because MacLaren feared losing Kat after she suffered a life-threatening miscarriage. He also sees that they began to grow apart due to MacLaren's work commitments. MacLaren recovers in time to stage a cover story for Forbes, claiming that Philip is MacLaren's confidential informant and went rogue to prove that MacLaren's life is insecure. MacLaren returns home, and tries to apologize to Kat, but she avoids him.
11	11	"Marcy"	Andy Mikita	Jason Whiting	December 26, 2016
Carly loses custody of her son until the trial. Grace is due to die, so Trevor kidnaps her to save her life. She is overwritten despite having avoided the accident that would have killed her. Grace and another newly arrived traveler, Ellis, are computer programmers who have fled an anti-Director faction in the future. Ellis has developed a code that is sought by this faction, and has returned to the 21st century to keep it from them. David and Marcy consummate their relationship. However, her condition worsens and Boyd stabilizes her, but Marcy is near death. Grace, who was in charge of social media research and identifying hosts, regrets missing that the real Marcy had a brain issue. She wants to correct Marcy's condition by reloading Marcy's original transfer into the functional part of her brain, saving her at the cost of her 21st-century memories. MacLaren lets Marcy speak to David first. However, her condition becomes critical shortly before David returns home, and she is overwritten by her earlier self. Her team introduces her to David.
12	12	"Grace"	Amanda Tapping	Ashley Park	January 2, 2017
Kathryn confronts MacLaren, believing he is having an affair, leading him to end his relationship with Carly. Charlotte, the misfire historian, is overwritten and murders her family. She attempts to assassinate Grace, but Trevor intervenes. Grace reveals that she used Marcy's reload to send a reset code into the Director, an advanced AI, so the anti-Director faction will no longer be able to send its own travelers. Jeff shoots Charlotte when she attempts to kill Carly. Boyd reveals she received a dubious order to kill MacLaren; Carly later reveals she was given the same mission. Ellis reveals he built a quantum frame in his barn, a receptacle to receive the Director's download to escape the faction. David is held at gunpoint by another assassin but is saved by Marcy. The team, having survived assassins at Philip's, arrives at the farm where Trevor has received a text to destroy the frame. Assassins surround the farm as Ellis shoots Trevor to protect the frame, but the shot hits Grace as well. Ellis shuts down the perimeter shield in the hope that the Director will help them, then channels a message (which kills him) to destroy the frame. Forbes and an FBI team, not assassins, burst into the barn.

=== Season 2 (2017) ===
No. overall	No. in season	Title	Directed by	Written by	Original release date
13	1	"Ave Machina"	Andy Mikita	Brad Wright	October 16, 2017
Vincent Ingram (Traveler 001) recounts his arrival in the 21st century to his therapist. His arrival was the first test of projecting human consciousness through time. He was to confirm his arrival minutes before dying in the fall of the World Trade Center on September 11, 2001, a time and place selected to not affect the timeline. The intended host leaves the room, 001's consciousness inhabits an unexpected body, and the computer he had set up to message the Director fails. While the plan was for 001 to stay and die, he flees, narrowly survives the plane's impact with the building, and goes into hiding. Meanwhile, MacLaren and his team are being interrogated by the FBI about the quantum frame and its purpose, while David deals with the mental aftermath of an attempt on his life.
14	2	"Protocol 4"	Andy Mikita	Jason Whiting	October 23, 2017
MacLaren investigates a mass arrival of Travelers via the quantum frame while also trying to repair his marriage with Kat. Philip gets assistance with his addiction from new Traveler 4514, Jenny. Marcy treats David for PTSD, but is dealing with feelings of detachment and disassociation herself. Carly and Jeff try to present a wholesome family situation to Child Protective Services and regain custody of their son. Trevor and Grace bond in the hospital while recovering from their injuries.
15	3	"Jacob"	Andy Mikita	Pat Smith & Ashley Park	October 30, 2017
Three months after the events with the quantum frame, MacLaren and Kat are working through their issues during her first trimester. Marcy has moved out of David's apartment and has taken a job as an X-ray technician at a local hospital. Philip has traded one addiction for another, but is in denial about it. Trevor is growing concerned with the lack of communication from the Director. The discovery of a murdered Traveler team puts MacLaren on the trail of Vincent; the Director sends messengers to both just as they prepare to attack each other.
16	4	"11:27"	Amanda Tapping	Ashley Park & Pat Smith	November 6, 2017
The Director assigns two new missions to the team: MacLaren, Carly and Marcy must assassinate Congressman Bishop in order to make him a martyr while Trevor and Philip must help a radical environmental activist succeed in her plan to bomb a research facility that is working on a genetically modified seed that has disastrous consequences for the future. When the activist changes her mind due to the kinship she feels with Philip and Trevor, the Director uses her as a messenger to instruct Trevor to go in her place. Philip remotely disarms the bomb to save Trevor, violating Protocol One, but the mission is later completed by an unknown person after Trevor publishes the activist's manifesto.
17	5	"Jenny"	Andy Mikita	Jason Whiting & Ken Kabatoff	November 13, 2017
An anti-viral formula is sent to Philip via messenger and he memorizes it. Jenny passes the formula on to fellow Traveler Derek so it can be synthesized and distributed to other Traveler teams, as well as to people who would otherwise be super-spreaders of the virus, which historically killed 70,000 people. However, two weeks after dissemination, people around the world start contracting a virus even more dangerous than the original one. With no contact from the Director, Marcy and Derek rush to find a solution as the death toll rises. Jenny reveals that the mass arrivals were all from the Faction, during the period when the Director was offline, and they manipulated the formula to increase the potency of the virus.
18	6	"U235"	Andy Mikita	Ashley Park & Pat Smith	November 20, 2017
The Faction's plan to save the future by killing 2 billion people in the present (opposing the Director's plan to make multiple small changes) is well underway. Medical nanites are ineffective against the virus. Grace realizes that the only way to solve the problem is to fix the Director in the future by delivering uranium-235 to its future location, so it can send help back to the 21st century. The original plan for this gets compromised and the team is forced to improvise an alternative temporary power source. They drop off the device, tricking the Faction members sent ahead of them. The Director is brought back online in the future, regains access to the reactor, overwrites much of the remaining Faction, and sends back a cure for the virus.
19	7	"17 Minutes"	Amanda Tapping	Brad Wright	November 27, 2017
MacLaren's team is given a mission to collect and safeguard a meteorite containing a key component of the Director, as it will likely be the Faction's next target. The mission goes smoothly until the team is ambushed and all are killed. The Director initiates Protocol Alpha and sends back a Traveler to save the team before the ambush. There are very few host candidates near the team's remote location, and the time window is very short (17 minutes). The Director sends a traveler into a nearby skydiver, but she is unsuccessful in reaching the team in time. New attempts are made, sending different travelers into the same host at successively later times. Each learns from the last, improving the strategy used to reach the team, but the repeated overwrites damage the host. At that point, a different host is selected, and the mission is eventually successful.
20	8	"Traveler 0027"	Amanda Tapping	Ashley Park	December 4, 2017
Three high-ranking Travelers are sent back by the Director to put Grace on trial for overwriting a person who was not assigned to be her host and for sabotaging the Grand Plan. MacLaren and the team must give testimony at the trial, which will determine if she should be overwritten or not. Meanwhile, the Faction is trying to replenish its numbers by overwriting people with the stored minds in the quantum frame. As Grace is being sentenced, she learns that the trial was staged by the Director to find out which of the three Judges was acting against the Grand Plan. This strategy succeeds and MacLaren's team secures the quantum frame.
21	9	"Update"	Amanda Tapping	Pat Smith	December 11, 2017
Philip is ordered by the Director to attend an update with other Historians, where the altered timeline's history is imprinted onto their minds, but it comes with physical and emotional consequences. Trevor tries to help a former football teammate with past trauma. Hall returns from prison and has a new mission assigned to him from the Director. Kat has complications with the pregnancy.
22	10	"21C"	Will Waring	Brad Wright	December 11, 2017
Marcy puts herself in a near-death state to recover her lost memories from when she was reset. The memories she receives include those of the original host Marcy, showing that the host's intellectual disability was caused by Vincent/001 testing Simon's incomplete consciousness-transfer technology on her. While she is out of commission, MacLaren and the rest of the team are ordered to provide Hall with backup in protecting the future 53rd President of the United States, who is currently a prepubescent girl.
23	11	"Simon"	Will Waring	Jason Whiting	December 18, 2017
The team track down Simon (Traveler 0004), a specialist who developed the consciousness transfer technology in the future and was sent into a host body that developed schizophrenia after arrival. Simon, who set up the Travelers' communications system in the 21st, is haunted by hallucinations of Vincent, who previously convinced an institutionalized Simon that the Director wanted him to build transfer technology in the 21st century.
24	12	"001"	Eric McCormack	Ken Kabatoff	December 18, 2017
Vincent demands that MacLaren's team leave him alone to finish his project. When the team refuses to comply, Vincent holds Kat, David, Jeff, Ray, and Grace hostage, and forces the team members to record videos revealing themselves as Travelers. The team must choose to either break protocol (and possibly be overwritten by the Director) or to try to save their loved ones. 001 transfers his consciousness into his therapist, Katrina Perrow, to escape the Director who later only overwrites Vincent's empty body.

=== Season 3 (2018) ===
No. overall	No. in season	Title	Directed by	Written by	Original release date
25	1	"Ilsa"	Eric McCormack	Brad Wright	December 14, 2018
MacLaren, his team, and their loved ones are taken to a safe house protected by FBI agents, most of whom are Travelers. A powerful AI named Ilsa, created by one Dr. Teslia, is unexpectedly used by The Director to communicate with people in the 21st century. Dr. Teslia contacts FBI Special Agent Joanne Yates and The Director gives Yates information needed to successfully convince FBI Director Stevenson to cancel a mission to capture MacLaren's team. The mission is highly classified, and Stevenson is shocked that Yates knows about it.
26	2	"Yates"	Andy Mikita	Ken Kabatoff	December 14, 2018
A tabloid television host spreads inflammatory rhetoric about Travelers, leading to an attack that kills the wife of a political candidate. MacLaren and Yates adjust to their new partnership, with Yates also acting as the FBI liaison to MacLaren's team. The partnership starts with them protecting the television host, who was historically murdered. Instead, he is overwritten by a Traveler before that happens, and he publicly apologizes for the cynical manipulation of his followers.
27	3	"Protocol 3"	Andy Mikita	Jason Whiting	December 14, 2018
MacLaren wakes up unable to remember the previous day. Using his car's location data he retraces his steps back to where Aleksander (from season 1, episode 3) was in a foster home. The boy is now a disturbed youth with a horrific future, and MacLaren's mission was to kill him. MacLaren's positive impact on the boy changes the timeline, though, and the mission is aborted. Dr. Teslia is surprised to learn that Ilsa has had a major leap in its capabilities, seemingly on its own.
28	4	"Perrow"	Amanda Tapping	Pat Smith	December 14, 2018
Traveler 001, who has transferred his consciousness from Vincent Ingram to his former psychologist, Katrina Perrow, is captured by the Faction. The team learns that 001 is now in Perrow's body and tries to find him/her. 001 agrees to support the Faction and transfers to a new host, using the device that Simon had constructed. The team is unsure where 001's consciousness now resides and gets a mission to allow Ilsa access to the internet, which Grace accomplishes. Jeff has an armed confrontation with the team, telling him that he knows of their existence as Travelers, and is overwritten by Traveler 5416. Kat is suspicious and suffering from hallucinations, and David has suffered a concussion. Along with Jeff, they have difficulty with their loved ones.
29	5	"Naomi"	Amanda Tapping	Ashley Park	December 14, 2018
Child messenger Naomi prevents a deadly accident at a nuclear power plant. The messenger AI goes rogue, risking her life. The team attempts to extract it from Naomi, but the program expands too rapidly. It transfers itself to Trevor, but is extracted by the Director. Later, Trevor starts to exhibit a brain disorder. Traveler 5416, who was sent back to handle solo missions, adjusts to the body of Jeff. MacLaren deals with Kat's suspicions by falsely telling her that she chose to try the memory inhibitor to deal with trauma from when a terrorist cell went after them. Marcy agrees to train David in firearm safety and self-defense after he buys a gun.
30	6	"Philip"	Will Waring	Pat Smith	December 14, 2018
During an update for historians, one of them dies and is overwritten by a new traveler. The Faction breaks in to the update session and kidnaps the historians. Hall is critically injured and the team uses a memory recovery device to find where the historians are being held. Jeff's sergeant tells him he needs to get help from a social worker before he can go back to being a police officer. Jeff asks David to merely sign his therapy form so he can get his job back, but David insists on Jeff following an anti-addiction program. Philip is interrogated by the Faction and is reunited with historian Kyle, who sympathizes with the Faction's goal. The Faction saves someone's life based on information from Kyle, reinforcing his sympathy with them. Through the memory recovery device, Hall provides information from when he was tracking Kyle, revealing that he was shot by his teammates Kyle and Luca, who have sided with the Faction. Hall is able to show the team where the historians are being held and the team is dispatched, along with Jeff. Maclaren's team saves Philip and kills Luca and Kyle. The team saves all the historians while killing many of the Faction. Hall is told he saved them all and he passes away in peace. Philip is seen throwing out the yellow pills which historians have to take.
31	7	"Trevor"	Will Waring	Ashley Park	December 14, 2018
Trevor suffers from temporal aphasia, a brain disorder that repeatedly leaves the victim physically frozen. He and the Director agree that he should be overwritten in approximately 36 hours. Trevor reveals to Grace that he and his wife were two of the first to transfer consciousness, and that she is the only other person to have had temporal dysphasia. He drew up plans for a cure but did not manage to implement it. Grace and the team work from his remembered plans to realize the cure, despite Trevor's reluctance. They administer it to Trevor during an episode, having turned off the lights and cameras so the Director could not overwrite him. Upon waking, Trevor is angry that the team did not respect his wish to be overwritten, and his agreement with the Director. When they turn the power back on, the Director does not overwrite him.
32	8	"Archive"	Amanda Tapping	Ken Kabatoff	December 14, 2018
A Traveler with a mission vital to humanity's survival arrives in the body of a serial killer, who is arrested moments after being overwritten. MacLaren tries to convince Yates to keep the Traveler out of jail until he can complete his mission. The team breaks him out of custody, and the mission is completed. Jeff is given a solo mission to rescue a Traveler Archivist who has been captured by the Faction. He helps the Archivist escape and enlists David's help in getting the injured Archivist to the Archive. David and the Archivist are shot when the Archive is breached.
33	9	"David"	Bryan C. Knight	Jason Whiting	December 14, 2018
The Faction sets off nuclear blasts that destroy all of the Travelers' archives outside the US. David, left for dead by the Faction in the last surviving archive, is the only person who can disarm the nuclear device. He succeeds but is exposed to lethal radiation. Kat's suspicions about MacLaren, temporarily allayed, surge again and she throws him out – for her, the marriage is over as she feels he is no longer the man she first met. Jeff tries to escape from an interrogation by 001; he is eventually found having been walled up. Marcy hopes the Director will send a Traveler medical team to save David but no help arrives. In the moment before he dies, David conveys a message from the Director: "Protocol Omega".
34	10	"Protocol Omega"	Amanda Tapping	Heath Affolter & Brad Wright	December 14, 2018
By invoking Protocol Omega the Director has indicated that it is no longer intervening in this timeline. The team surmises that this is because the Traveler program has failed. Jeff has been overwritten by 001 and abducts Marcy to obtain the backdoor code to the Director that is stored in her brain. She kills herself to prevent this, so 001 uploads his consciousness to the internet, enabling him to exist in the future and ultimately gain control. Russia and China blame the U.S. for the nuclear explosions in their nations and target the U.S. with a nuclear strike. MacLaren uses 001's machine to send his consciousness into his host's younger body on the day when his host met Kat in Whytecliff Park. Rather than starting a relationship with her, he tells her to give her then-boyfriend a second chance. He later gives a written warning to Burns about Helios. On September 11, 2001 he goes to an office in the World Trade Center just before 001's expected arrival there and emails the Director: "Traveler program will fail. Do not send 001." The original Marcy of the 21st century, who has not been injured by 001, happens to sit beside David on a bus and they strike up a conversation. The Director acknowledges that the first Traveler program has failed and starts a program for version two.

== Critical reception ==
The first season of Travelers received a score of 100% on Rotten Tomatoes based on ten reviews with an average rating of 8.0/10. Neil Genzlinger, writing for The New York Times, described the first season as "tasty", and "enjoyable science fiction", with "some attention-grabbing flourishes and fine acting". Hanh Nguyen, writing for IndieWire, described the series as "fun and freaky", finding the series' appeal "in how the core group of five travelers adjust to life in our present", noting the "human nature in the travelers". Lawrence Devoe, of TheaterByte.com, called the series "tautly paced and suspenseful" with "well-developed characters", declaring that "Brad Wright has a real knack for creating futuristic series". Evan Narcisse, reviewing the first five episodes of the first season for io9, appreciated the moral dilemmas offered by the series premise and the awkwardness presented by the characters' interactions with their hosts' friends, colleagues, lovers, or caretakers: "This is a superhero show in double disguise, offering up clever explorations of the secret identity concept that touch on the guilt and contortions that come with living a double life." Netflix announced that the series was one of its "most devoured" series in 2017.

Writing in Forbes, Merrill Barr said of the second season: "There's a lot to love about what Travelers brings to the table this season. The show has truly come into its own." In reviewing the first two episodes of the second season, Nguyen of Indiewire called Travelers "an exploration of the human condition in all of its messy glory, [with] depictions of the most ingenious, yet disturbing means of time travel on screen".

Barr of Forbes said the third season brought "a mixed approach as the show returns to its mission-of-the-week roots of season one, but this time while remixing the format with episodes of different substance from chapter to chapter. [...] What we get this year from the show is the best example of what a television series should be."

Netflix was criticized for using real footage from the Lac-Megantic rail disaster in the third season. The use of such footage was considered by many to be inappropriate for fictional content, and many sought to have the footage removed. Carrie Mudd, president of Peacock Alley, said they were not aware of the origin of the footage and the affected episode would be re-edited. The stock film company that provided the clip also apologized, pledging to review how images can be repurposed by Hollywood clients.
