= Argillite =

Sedimentary rock, mostly of indurated clay particles

- Sedimentary rock
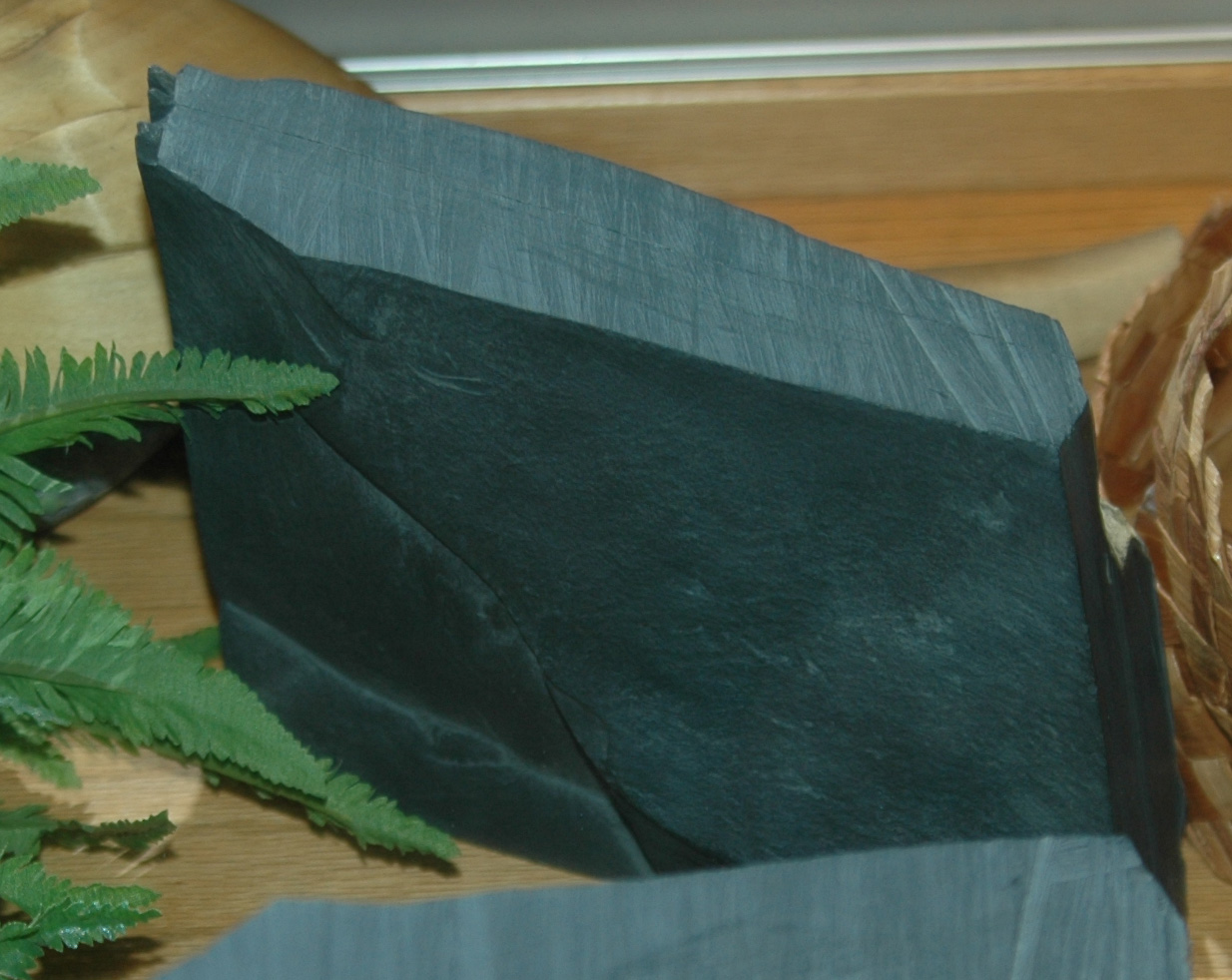
- A piece of black argillite from Haida Gwaii, Canada

Composition
- indurated clay particles

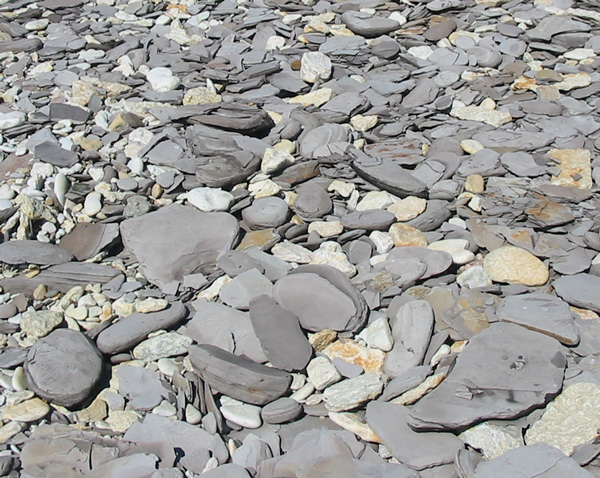
Grey chunks of graptolitic argillite on Pakri Peninsula, Estonia; yellowish and white chunks are limestone

Argillite ( /ˈɑːrdʒɪlaɪt/) is a fine-grained sedimentary rock composed predominantly of indurated clay particles. Argillaceous rocks are basically lithified muds and oozes. They contain variable amounts of silt-sized particles. The argillites grade into shale when the fissile layering typical of shale is developed. Another name for poorly lithified argillites is mudstone. These rocks, although variable in composition, are typically high in aluminium and silica with variable alkali and alkaline earth cations. The term pelitic or pelite is often applied to these sediments and rocks. Metamorphism of argillites produces slate, phyllite, and pelitic schist.

== Belt Supergroup ==
The Belt Supergroup, an assemblage of rocks of late Precambrian (Mesoproterozoic) age, includes thick sequences of argillite, as well as other metamorphosed or semi-metamorphosed mudstones. It is exposed primarily in western Montana, including the Bitterroot Valley and Bitterroot Mountains, the Missoula area, Flathead Lake, and Glacier National Park, and in northern Idaho. There are also minor occurrences in northeastern Washington and western Wyoming. Excellent outcrops of deep purple, wine red, red, blue, turquoise, and green argillites of the Belt Supergroup can be seen in Glacier National Park in northwestern Montana and in Wolf Creek Canyon along Interstate 15 in west-central Montana.

== "Black slate" ==
The Haida carvings of Haida Gwaii along the coast of British Columbia are aboriginal art treasures created from a type of a hard, fine black silt argillite, sometimes called "black slate". The black slate occurs only at a quarry on a Slatechuck Mountain in the upper basin of Slatechuck Creek, near the town of Skidegate on Graham Island. At one time, around 1900, it was shipped to Victoria for manufacturing; today the Haida have a monopoly on use of the argillite. Argillite carvings are synonymous with Haida artwork and are one of the few art forms on the Northwest Coast that is the exclusive right of one cultural group. This artwork has been of high quality and prized around the world since the Haida first began carving it to trade and sell to sailors around 1800. Contemporary Haida carvers continue the tradition.

== See also ==
- Mudrock – Type of sedimentary rock
- Catlinite – Type of metamorphosed mudstone
- Lutite – Old terminology for clayey sedimentary rock
