= Juskatla =

- logging camp
- Location of Juskatla in British Columbia
- Coordinates: 53°36′22″N 132°19′24″W
- Country: Canada
- Province: British Columbia
- Region: Haida Gwaii
- Regional District: Skeena-Queen Charlotte
- Founded: ~1940

Area
  - Total: 7.5 km^{2} (2.9 sq mi)
- Elevation: 60 m (200 ft)

Population (2005)
  - Total: 5
  - Density: 0.67/km^{2} (1.7/sq mi)
- Time zone: UTC-8 (PST)
- Postal code span: V0T 1J0
- Waterways: Juskatla Inlet (Masset Inlet)

Juskatla is a settlement on Juus Ḵáahlii (formerly Juskatla Inlet), a sidewater off the southern end of Masset Inlet on Graham Island, the largest and northernmost of the Haida Gwaii islands off the North Coast of British Columbia, Canada.

== Background ==
Juskatla is solely a logging camp. It is sometimes also called Juskatla Camp and has neither a residential area nor any businesses other than forestry facilities. Loggers usually work in Juskatla but live in nearby Port Clements.

Juskatla used to have a steady population of only 5 inhabitants, but now has none. A few people work there for a logging outfit, Edwards & Associates.

Juskatla was established in the 1940s during World War II to supply the Allied air force with wood.

It is still the center of wood processing on northern Graham Island and is currently operated by Taan Forest.
