= Masset Inlet =

Bay on the coast of British Columbia, Canada

Coordinates: 53.716667°N 132.333333°W

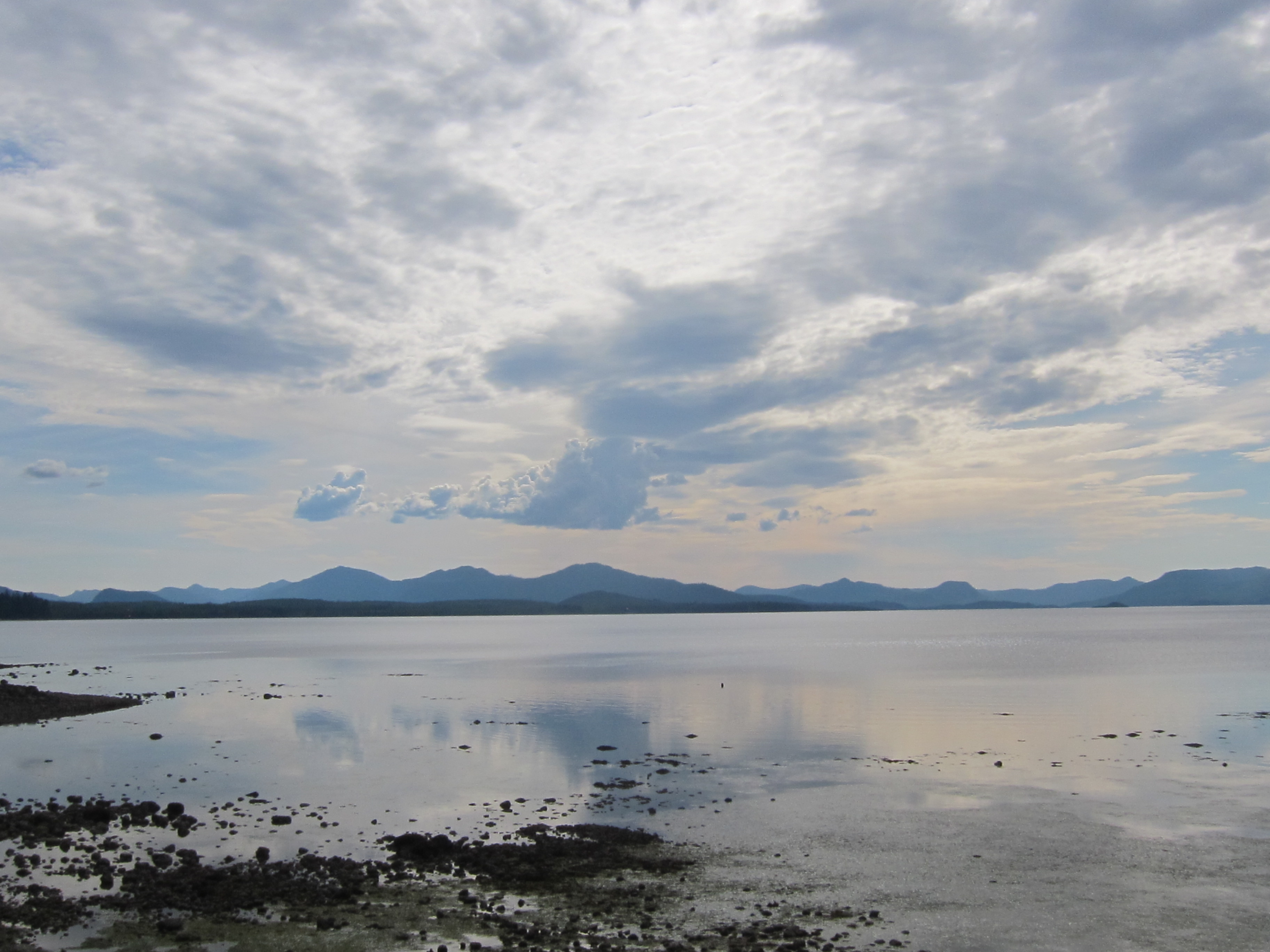
Masset Inlet, from Port Clements harbour

Masset Inlet is a large saltwater bay located in the heart of the lowland of northern Graham Island, the northernmost and largest island of the Haida Gwaii islands on the North Coast of British Columbia, Canada. It is fed by several rivers, the largest of which is the Yakoun River, and is connected to the open sea of the Dixon Entrance by the narrow Masset Sound and Masset Harbour, which opens onto McIntyre Bay. The communities of Port Clements and Sewall are located on the shores of Masset Inlet. The community of Juskatla is located on Juus Ḵáahlii, the largest of Masset Inlet's arms. There are several islands in the inlet, the largest of which is Kumdis Island, at the inlet's egress to Masset Sound and just north of Port Clements. Masset Inlet helps form the isthmus of the Naikoon Peninsula.

According to Walbran Masset Inlet (as well as Masset Island, Masset Sound and the village of Masset) came from the Haida word Masst, meaning "large island". Captain Douglas, on his second visit from Nootka Sound aboard the Iphigenia on June 19, 1789 named the bay leading to the inlet McIntyre's Bay. This name was used on the charts of Dixon and Meares. The American traders called the inlet Hancock's River as shown in Ingraham's chart of 1792 after the American brig Hancock. In 1853, H.N. Knox of the Royal Navy, mate on HMS Virago did a sketch survey of the harbour when the name Masset was adopted by the British. A survey was made in 1907 by Captain Learmouth on HMS Egeria.
