= John Vaillant =

American writer and journalist (born 1962)

John H. Vaillant
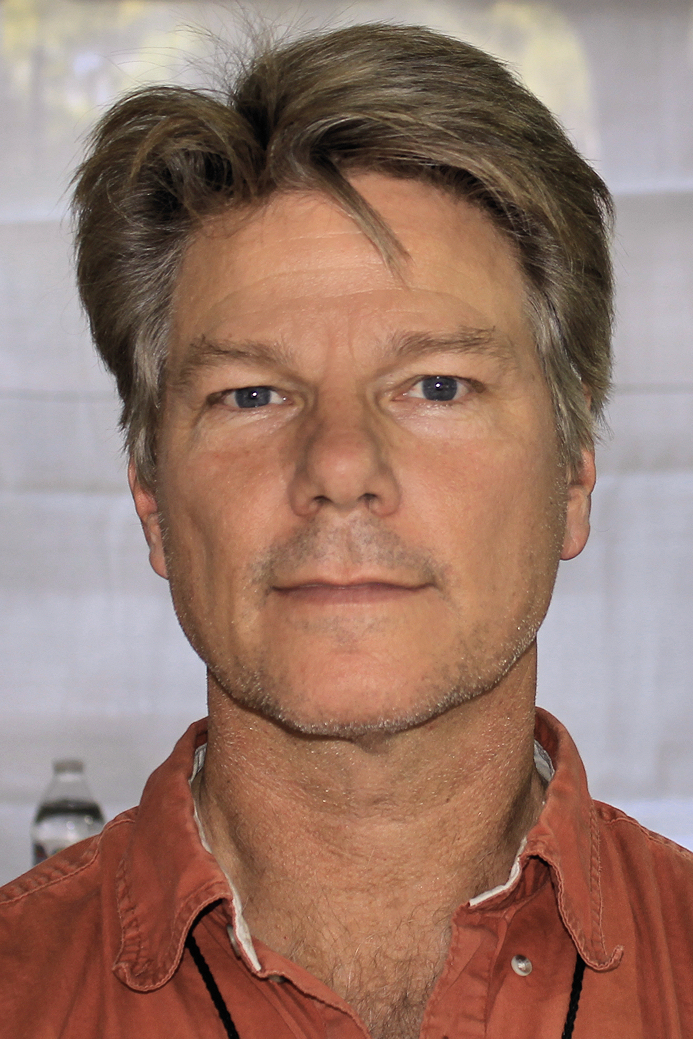
- Vaillant at the 2015 Texas Book Festival
- Born: 1962 (age 63–64); Massachusetts, U.S.
- Occupation: Journalist

John Vaillant on Bookbits radio talks about The Tiger.

John Vaillant (born 1962) is an American Canadian writer and journalist whose work has appeared in The New Yorker, The Atlantic, National Geographic, and Outside. He has written both non-fiction and fiction books.

== Personal life ==
Vaillant was born and raised in Massachusetts and has lived in Vancouver since 1998. He is the son of Harvard psychiatrist and social scientist George Eman Vaillant and grandson of the archaeologist George Clapp Vaillant. He is married to the potter, writer, and anthropologist Nora Walsh.

== Writing career ==
Vaillant's first book, The Golden Spruce, dealt with the felling of the Golden Spruce or Kiidk'yaas on Haida Gwaii by Grant Hadwin. It was a bestseller and won a number of awards.

In 2010, he published The Tiger: A True Story of Vengeance and Survival about a man-eating tiger incident that took place in 1997, in Russia's Far Eastern Primorsky Krai, where most of the world's Amur tigers live. It was a bestseller and won a number of awards before being translated into 16 languages. Film rights were optioned by Brad Pitt's film company, Plan B.

In 2015, Vaillant published The Jaguar's Children, a novel about an undocumented Mexican immigrant trapped inside the empty tank of a water truck that has been abandoned in the desert by human smugglers. The novel was longlisted for the Dublin IMPAC Prize and the Kirkus Fiction Prize. It was shortlisted for the 2015 Rogers Writers' Trust Fiction Prize. The Jaguar's Children received positive reviews from the New York Times and NPR.

Vaillant's fourth book, Fire Weather: The Making of a Beast, was published in 2023. It follows the events and aftermath of the 2016 Fort McMurray wildfire, which caused billions of dollars' worth of damage and destroyed around 2,400 homes and forced the evacuation of over 80,000 people, and describes the anthropological history between humans and fire, how it has shaped our societies, and how it now threatens them in the context of climate change. Fire Weather came out June 6, 2023, which opinion writer David Wallace-Wells of The New York Times said was, "unfortunately, exquisitely timed." The book's release coincided with the start of several days of hazardous smoke levels and a thick yellowish haze across the eastern United States due to profuse smoke plumes from Canadian wildfires that drifted south. Fire Weather was longlisted for the 2023 National Book Award for Nonfiction, and shortlisted for the 2023 Hilary Weston Writers' Trust Prize for Nonfiction. It was awarded Britain's £50,000 Baillie Gifford Prize for Non-Fiction in November 2023.

== Awards and honors ==
- 2005 Governor General's Award, The Golden Spruce
- 2005 Writers' Trust Non-Fiction Prize, The Golden Spruce
- 2010 British Columbia's National Award for Canadian Non-Fiction, The Tiger
- 2010 The Globe and Mail Best Book for Science 2010, The Tiger
- 2012 Nicolas Bouvier Prize in Saint Malo, France, The Tiger (French translation)
- 2014 Windham–Campbell Literature Prize in Nonfiction, achievement award valued at $150,000 the largest of its kind.
- 2022 GQ - The 50 Best Books of Literary Journalism of the 21st Century, The Tiger
- 2023 Baillie Gifford Prize for Non-Fiction, Fire Weather
- 2023 Hilary Weston Writers' Trust Prize for Nonfiction finalist for Fire Weather
- 2023 National Book Award for Nonfiction finalist for Fire Weather

== Bibliography ==
Vaillant is the author of these books:

- Fire Weather: A True Story from a Hotter World. Knopf. 2023. ISBN 9781524732851.
- The Jaguar's Children. Houghton Mifflin Harcourt. 2015. ISBN 978-0544315495.
- The Tiger: A True Story of Vengeance and Survival. Alfred A. Knopf, Inc. 2010. ISBN 978-0307268938.
- The Golden Spruce: A True Story of Myth, Madness, and Greed. W. W. Norton & Company. 2005. ISBN 978-0393058871.
