= Yaaguun Suu Conservancy =

Protected area in British Columbia, Canada

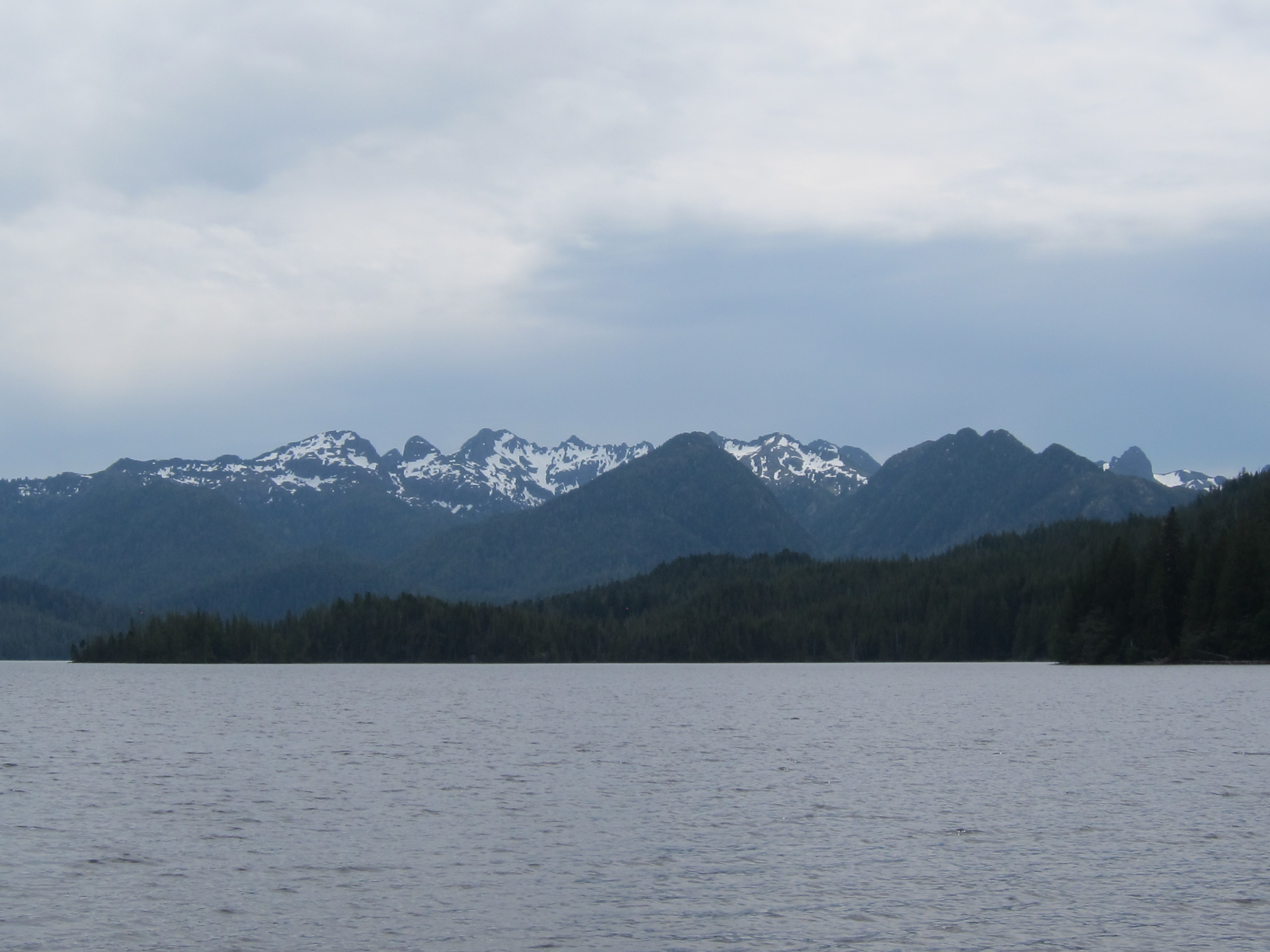
- Yakoun Lake with the Queen Charlotte Mountains in the background

- Location within British Columbia
- Location: Canada
- Coordinates: 53°19′16″N 132°16′58″W
- Area: 7,970 ha (30.8 sq mi)
- Established: May 23, 2008
- Operator: BC Parks

Yaaguun Suu Conservancy is a conservancy in Haida Gwaii, British Columbia, Canada. The total area is 7,970 hectares (19,700 acres). It covers Yakoun Lake and its watershed.

Yaaguun Suu is the Haida name for Yakoun Lake.
