= Masset Sound =

Inlet on Graham Island, BC, Canada

Coordinates: 53°55′N 132°7′W

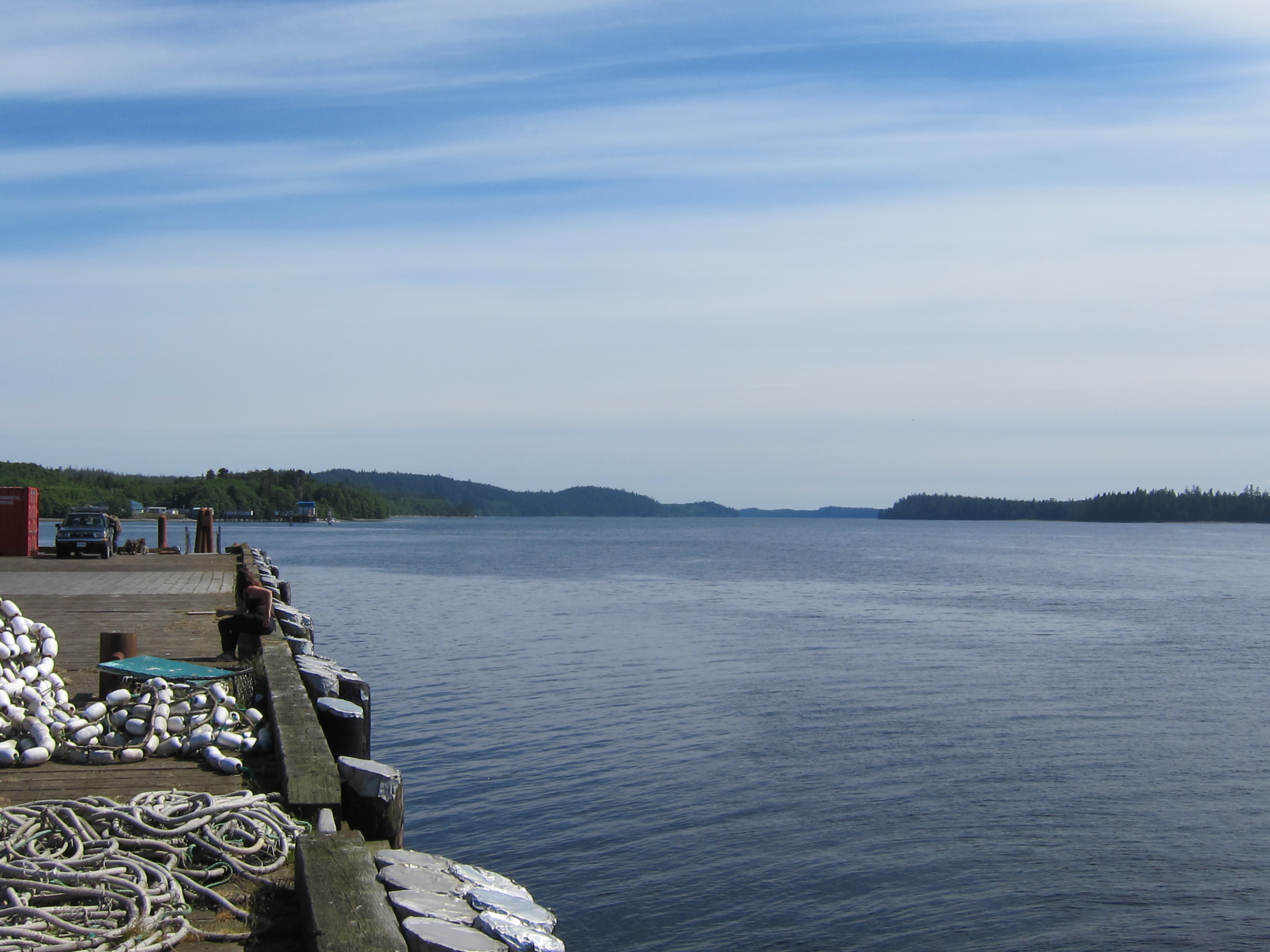
Masset Sound, from the Masset town pier

Masset Sound is a 38-kilometre (24 mi) saltwater inlet on Graham Island, the largest and northernmost of the Haida Gwaii islands of the North Coast of British Columbia, Canada, connecting Masset Inlet in the island's interior with the open sea via Masset Harbour and McIntyre Bay to the Dixon Entrance. It averages 1.5 kilometres (0.93 mi) in width and is less than 750 metres (2,460 ft) width in certain spots. The town of Masset is located on the east bank of Masset Sound's northern end.
