= Kiidk'yaas =

Sacred tree in Haida Gwaii, British Columbia, Canada

Coordinates: 53°37′12″N 132°12′29″W

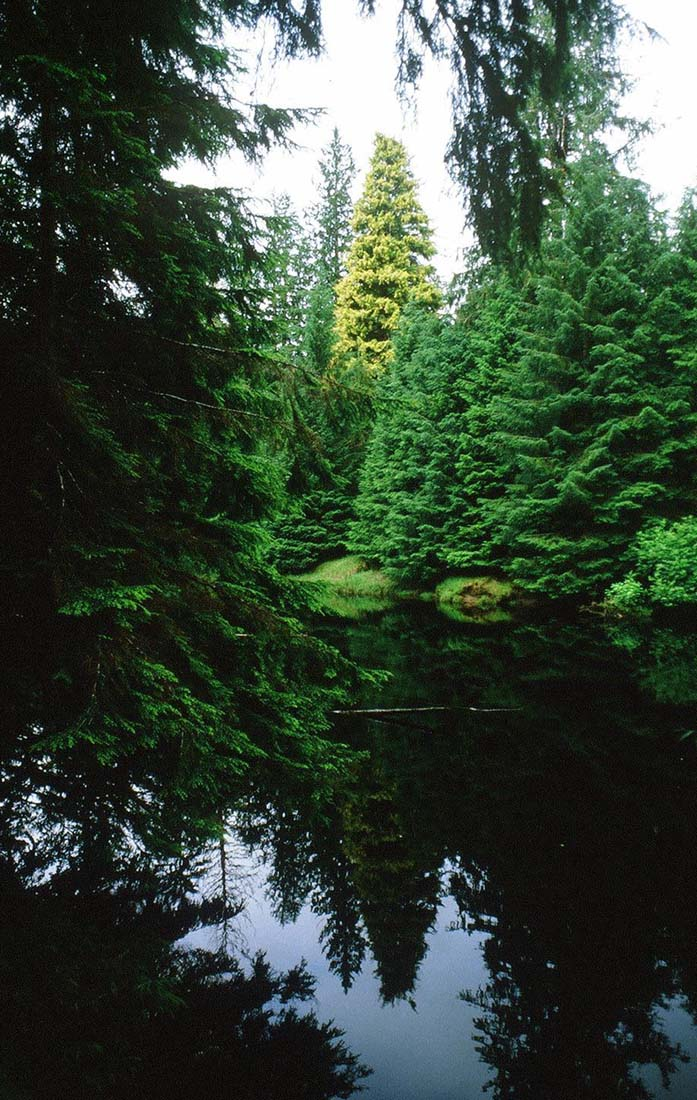
Kiidk'yaas in 1984

Kiidk'yaas pronounced [kiːd̥kʼjaːs] (meaning "ancient tree" in the Haida language), also known as the Golden Spruce, was a Sitka spruce tree (Picea sitchensis 'Aurea') that grew on the banks of the Yakoun River on the Haida Gwaii archipelago in British Columbia, Canada. It had a rare genetic mutation that caused its needles to be golden in colour (rather than the usual green). Kiidk'yaas was considered sacred by the Haida people.

Kiidk'yaas was felled in January 1997 by Grant Hadwin as an act of protest against the logging industry. Kiidk'yaas and its felling are the subject of John Vaillant's 2005 book The Golden Spruce.

== Kiidk'yaas in Haida mythology ==
Kiidk'yaas features prominently in Haida mythology.

The Kiidk'yaas story tells of a young boy who disrespected nature and thereby caused a terrible storm to descend on his village. Only he and his grandfather survived the storm. As they fled the village, the grandfather warned the boy not to look back. The boy disobeyed, and was immediately turned into the Golden Spruce where he stood.

== Felling ==
In January 1997, 47-year-old unemployed forest engineer Grant Hadwin travelled to Haida Gwaii and purchased a chainsaw and other felling equipment. Early on the morning of January 20, 1997 he swam across the freezing Yakoun River and made a series of strategic deep cuts in Kiidk'yaas. The cuts were designed to leave Kiidk'yaas standing but weakened, so that it would be knocked over by the next strong winds. The tree fell two days later.

After cutting down the tree, Hadwin left the islands for Prince Rupert, British Columbia. He sent a fax to the media and the Haida nation claiming responsibility for the act, saying that he was motivated by "rage and hatred towards university-trained professionals and their extremist supporters". The act outraged people throughout Canada and received extensive media coverage. Hadwin was arrested, ordered to return to Haida Gwaii to stand trial, and was released on bail.

Hadwin planned to travel to his trial date by crossing the notoriously stormy and violent Hecate Strait (from Prince Rupert to Masset) alone by kayak in mid-winter. He departed Prince Rupert in February 1997 but never arrived at his trial. What is believed to be Hadwin's broken kayak and effects were found on Mary Island in June 1997. Whether he had been murdered, accidentally drowned, or left his belongings behind and fled into the wilderness is not known. His fate remains a mystery.

== Post-felling ==
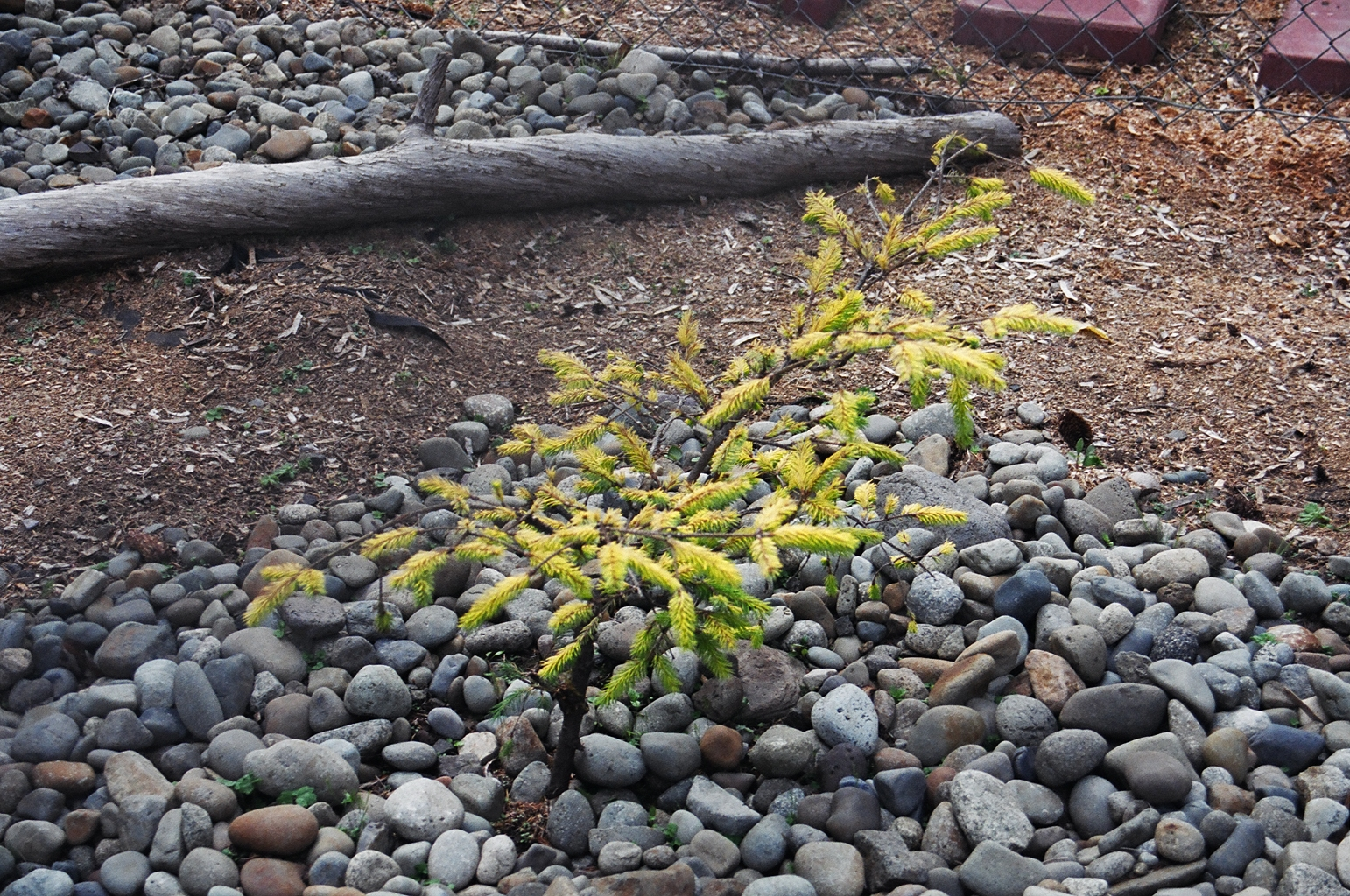
A sapling from Kiidk'yaas

In 1977 a group of botanists from the University of British Columbia (UBC) visited Haida Gwaii to take cuttings of Kiidk'yaas. These cuttings were grafted onto ordinary Sitka spruce, resulting in two golden saplings. The trees were grown in the UBC Botanical Garden and Centre for Plant Research. Upon hearing of the tree's destruction in 1997, the arboretum offered one of the two young trees to replace Kiidk'yaas. However, the sapling died in storage before it could be transported to Haida Gwaii. The second sapling survives at UBC.

After Kiidk'yaas' felling, attempts were made to propagate a further 80 cuttings (with the permission of the Haida people) in order to increase the chances of a successful offspring surviving.

After the Golden Spruce was felled in 1997, portions of the wood were salvaged for cultural projects. Some of the wood was used by Nova Scotia luthier George Rizsanyi and broadcaster Jowi Taylor in the creation of Six String Nation, a guitar celebrating Canadian history. At the request of the Haida Chief, an additional piece was collected by Leo Gagnon, a Haida carver living in Old Masset on Haida Gwaii, and used to carve a ceremonial mask.

== See also ==
- List of individual trees
