= Yakoun Lake =

Lake in British Columbia, Canada

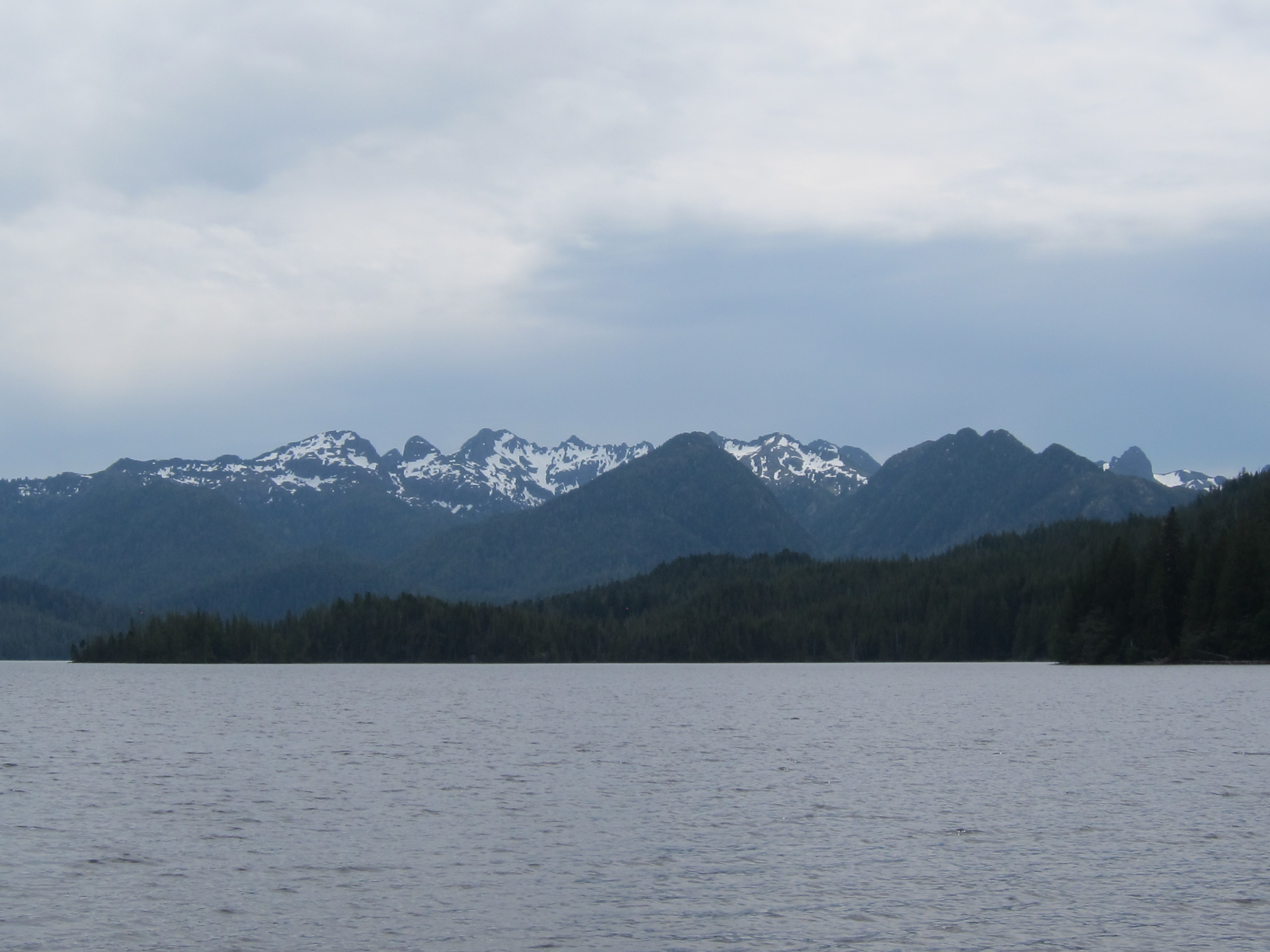
- Yakoun Lake with the Queen Charlotte Mountains in the background

- Location within British Columbia
- Location: Haida Gwaii, B.C.
- Coordinates: 53°19′16″N 132°16′58″W
- Type: Lake
- Primary inflows: Queen Charlotte Mountains
- Primary outflows: Yakoun River
- Basin countries: Canada

Yakoun Lake (Haida: Yaaguun Suu) is a lake in Graham Island, Haida Gwaii, in British Columbia, Canada. The lake is the source of Yakoun River. The Haida people have used the lake for fishing and other purposes for thousands of years.

Yakoun Lake and its watershed are in the Yaaguun Suu Conservancy.

To the southeast of the lake lies Daajing Giids, the nearest major town.

== See also ==
- List of lakes of British Columbia
