= Grant Hadwin =

Canadian forest engineer

- Hadwin shortly before his disappearance
- Born: Thomas Grant Hadwin; October 25, 1949; West Vancouver, British Columbia, Canada
- Disappeared: February 14, 1997 (aged 47); Near Prince Rupert, British Columbia, Canada
- Status: Missing, presumed dead
- Occupation: Forest engineer
- Known for: Cutting down Kiidk'yaas (the Golden Spruce)
- Children: 3

Thomas Grant Hadwin (born October 25, 1949) was a Canadian forest engineer. In January 1997, he felled Kiidk'yaas (also known as "the Golden Spruce"), a Sitka Spruce tree located on the Haida Gwaii archipelago and considered sacred by the Haida people. Hadwin stated that he cut the tree down as a protest against the logging industry. While facing criminal charges for the act, he disappeared en route to his trial. His fate remains unknown.

Hadwin is the subject of John Vaillant's 2004 book The Golden Spruce and Sasha Snow's 2015 documentary film Hadwin's Judgement. The film includes reenactments in which Hadwin is portrayed by actor Doug Chapman.

== Early life ==
Hadwin was born in West Vancouver, British Columbia. His family was active in the logging industry. Hadwin himself became a logger and later a forest engineer. However, he became increasingly upset with the logging industry's methods and impacts, and exhibited signs of mental instability.

== Cutting down of Kiidk'yaas ==
In January 1997, Hadwin traveled to Haida Gwaii and purchased a chainsaw and other felling equipment. Early on the morning of January 20, 1997, he swam across the freezing Yakoun River with all of his equipment and made a series of strategic deep cuts in Kiidk'yaas (the Golden Spruce). The cuts were designed to leave Kiidk'yaas standing, but weakened, so that it would be knocked over by the next strong winds. The tree fell two days later.

After cutting down the tree, Hadwin left the islands for Prince Rupert, British Columbia. He sent a fax to the media and the Haida nation claiming responsibility for the act, saying that he was motivated by "rage and hatred towards university trained professionals and their extremist supporters". The act outraged people throughout Canada and received extensive media coverage. Hadwin was arrested, ordered to return to Haida Gwaii to stand trial, and released on bail.

== Disappearance ==
Hadwin's court appearance was scheduled for February 18, 1997, in Masset. Numerous people speculated that Hadwin would be killed before he could stand trial. Hadwin stated that he feared for his safety if he were to travel from Prince Rupert to Masset by ferry or plane, and decided to make the trip across the Hecate Strait (a notoriously stormy and violent body of water) alone by kayak.

On February 11, Hadwin set out from Prince Rupert, but turned back a day later after being caught in a storm. On February 13, Hadwin set out again. The next day he was spotted 25 miles (40 km) north of Prince Rupert, but he failed to appear in court as scheduled. There have been no confirmed sightings of Hadwin ever since.

In June 1997, the wreckage of Hadwin's kayak and equipment was found on uninhabited Mary Island, an island about 4 miles long located 70 miles (110 km) northwest of Prince Rupert at the entrance to Revillagigedo Channel.

Because Hadwin was known to be an expert in wilderness survival and said to have an exceptional tolerance for the cold, some people believe that Hadwin faked his own death and vanished into the wilderness. His ultimate fate is unknown.

== See also ==
- List of people who disappeared mysteriously at sea
