= List of Canadian films of 2005 =

This is a list of Canadian films which were released in 2005.

| Title | Director | Cast | Genre | Notes | Ref |
|---|---|---|---|---|---|
| 3 Needles | Thom Fitzgerald | Lucy Liu, Olympia Dukakis, Shawn Ashmore, Sandra Oh | AIDS Drama | | |
| 7 Times Lucky | Gary Yates | Kevin Pollak, Liane Balaban, Jonas Chernick, James Tolkan, Babz Chula | Crime drama | Genie Award - Song | |
| Alone in the Dark | Uwe Boll | Christian Slater, Tara Reid, Stephen Dorff | Sci-fi horror | Canada-German co-production made with U.S. financing | |
| An American Haunting | Courtney Solomon | Donald Sutherland, Sissy Spacek, James D'Arcy, Rachel Hurd-Wood | Horror | Canada-U.K.-Romania co-production made with U.S. financing | |
| Amnesia: The James Brighton Enigma | Denis Langlois | Dusan Dukic, Louise Laprade, Norman Helms | Drama | | |
| American Soldiers | Sidney J. Furie | Curtis Morgan | Action | Direct to DVD | |
| Audition (L'Audition) | Luc Picard | Luc Picard, Suzanne Clément, Alexis Martin, Denis Bernard | Drama | Genie Award – Supporting Actor (Bernard); Prix Jutra – Musical Score | |
| Aurora Borealis | James C. E. Burke | Joshua Jackson, Donald Sutherland, Juliette Lewis, Louise Fletcher | Romance | Made with U.S. financing | |
| Aurore | Luc Dionne | Marianne Fortier, Serge Postigo, Stéphanie Lapointe, Alice Morel-Michaud | Drama | Based on true story of Aurore Gagnon; a remake of the 1952 film, La petite Aurore l’enfant martyre. | |
| Bailey's Billion$ | David Devine | Dean Cain, Laurie Holden, Jennifer Tilly, Tim Curry, Sheila McCarthy | Family comedy | | |
| Bangkok Girl | Jordan Clark | | Documentary | About sex tourism in Bangkok; made for TV | |
| Being Caribou | Leanne Allison & Diana Wilson | | National Film Board documentary | | |
| Being Human | Denys Desjardins | | Documentary produced with the National Film Board | | |
| Beowulf & Grendel | Sturla Gunnarsson | Gerard Butler, Stellan Skarsgård, Sarah Polley, Ingvar Eggert Sigurdsson | Epic Action, Adventure, Fantasy | Adaptation of the epic poem, Beowulf; filmed in Iceland; Canada-Iceland-Australia co-production | |
| The Best of Secter and the Rest of Secter | Joel Secter | David Secter | Documentary | | |
| Big Girl | Renuka Jeyapaian | Samantha Weinstein, Kris Holden-Reid | Short | TIFF – Best Canadian Short | |
| The Big White | Denys Desjardins | Robin Williams, Holly Hunter, Giovanni Ribisi, Woody Harrelson, Tim Blake Nelson, W. Earl Brown, Alison Lohman | | Canada-New Zealand co-production made with U.S. financing | |
| Black Widow | David Mortin | Sarah Slean, Martin Tielli, Mary Margaret O'Hara, Tom McCamus, Julian Richings | | A "Film Noir Musical" is based on the Evelyn Dick murder case made for TV. | |
| Bloodsuckers | Matthew Hastings | Dominic Zamprogna, A.J. Cook, Natassia Malthe | Horror | Made for TV | |
| Les Boys IV | George Mihalka | Rémy Girard, Pierre Lebeau, Marc Messier | Comedy | | |
| The Brotherhood IV | David DeCoteau | Sebastian Gacki, April Telek | Horror | | |
| The Cabin Movie | Dylan Akio Smith | Arabella Bushnell, Ben Cotton, Brad Dryborough, Ryan Robbins, Justine Warrington, Erin Wells | Comedy-drama | | |
| Cake | Nisha Ganatra | Heather Graham, David Sutcliffe, Taye Diggs, Sandra Oh, Cheryl Hines, Bruce Gray | Romantic comedy | Made with U.S. financing | |
| The Care Bears' Big Wish Movie | Larry Jacobs & Ron Pitts | voices Stephanie Beard, Robert Tinkler, Julie Lemieux, Linda Ballantyne, Stephen Ouimette | Animated feature | Direct to DVD | |
| Chairman George | Daniel Cross & Mila Aung-Thwin | George Sapounidis | Documentary | Made for TV | |
| La Classe de Madame Lise | Sylvie Groulx | | Documentary | | |
| cNote | Christopher Hinton | Michael Oesterle (music) | Visual music; animated short | Genie Award for Best Animated Short | |
| Continuous Journey | Ali Kazimi | | Documentary | In 1914 the Komagata Maru, a vessel with 378 immigrants sailing from Hong Kong, arrived in Vancouver only to become the first ship carrying migrants turned away by Canada. | |
| Conventum | Gilles Blais | | Documentary | | |
| C.R.A.Z.Y. | Jean-Marc Vallée | Michel Côté, Marc-André Grondin, Danielle Proulx, Pierre-Luc Brillant | Family Drama | TIFF – Best Canadian Feature | |
| The Dark Hours | Paul Fox | Kate Greenhouse, Aidan Devine, Gordon Currie, Dov Tiefenbach | Thriller | Direct to DVD | |
| Dehors novembre | Patrick Bouchard | | Animated short | | |
| Deluxe Combo Platter | Vic Sarin | Maria Sokoloff, Jennifer Tilly, Monika Schnarre, Barry Watson, Dave Thomas | Comedy | | |
| Dodging the Clock (Horloge biologique) | Ricardo Trogi | Patrice Robitaille | Comedy | | |
| Drifting States (Les États nordiques) | Denis Côté | Christian LeBlanc | Drama | | |
| Eighteen | Richard Bell | Brendan Fletcher, Carly Pope, Alan Cumming, Ian McKellen | Drama | Festival premiere was in tandem with 60th Anniversary of the end of WWII | |
| The End of Silence | Anita Doron | Ekaterina Shchelkanova, John Tokatlidis, Sarah Harmer | Drama | | |
| Eve and the Fire Horse | Julia Kwan | Phoebe Jojo Kut, Hollie Lo, Vivian Wu, Lester Chan | Drama | Special Jury Prize at the Sundance Film Festival and the Claude Jutra Award | |
| Exiles in Lotusland (Le méchant trip) | Ilan Saragosti | Mélissa Cossette, Dany Nadeau | National Film Board documentary | | |
| Familia | Louise Archambault | Sylvie Moreau, Macha Grenon, Juliette Gosselin, Micheline Lanctôt | Family drama | Claude Jutra Award; TIFF – Best First Feature | |
| Fetching Cody | David Ray | Jay Baruchel, Sarah Lind, Nicole Muñoz, Jim Byrnes, Ken Jones | Drama | | |
| Getting Gilliam | Vincenzo Natali | | Documentary | About the making of Terry Gilliam's film Tideland made for TV. | |
| Gilles Carle: The Untamable Mind (Gilles Carle ou l'indomptable imaginaire) | Charles Binamé | Gilles Carle | Documentary | | |
| Guy X | Saul Metzstein | Jason Biggs, Natascha McElhone, Jeremy Northam, Michael Ironside | Mystery, comedy | Canada-U.K.-Iceland co-production | |
| The Hamster Cage | Larry Kent | Alan Scarfe, Carly Pope, Scott Hylands | Family drama | | |
| Hardwood | Hubert Davis | Mel Davis (Harlem Globetrotters) | Documentary produced with the National Film Board | Academy Award for Documentary Short Subject nomination | |
| Hogtown: The Politics of Policing | Min Sook Lee | | Documentary | | |
| Ill-Fated | Mark Lewis | Paul Campbell, Niki Clyne, John Callander, Peter Outerbridge | Drama | | |
| Kamataki | Claude Gagnon | Matthew Smiley, Tatsuya Fuji, Kazuko Yoshiyuki | Drama | | |
| Kardia | Su Rynard | Mimi Kuzyk, Peter Stebbings, Kristin Booth, Ariel Waller | Drama | | |
| Land of the Dead | George A. Romero | John Leguizamo, Asia Argento, Simon Baker, Dennis Hopper, Robert Joy | Horror | Canada-France co-production made with U.S. financing | |
| Lie with Me | Clement Virgo | Lauren Lee Smith, Eric Balfour, Polly Shannon, Kate Lynch | Romance | | |
| The Life and Hard Times of Guy Terrifico | Michael Mabbott | Matt Murphy, Natalie Radford, Kris Kristofferson | Mockumentary | TIFF - Best Canadian First Feature | |
| Life with My Father (La Vie avec mon père) | Sébastien Rose | Raymond Bouchard, Paul Ahmarani, David La Haye, Hélène Florent | Comedy, drama | Canada-France co-production | |
| Living on the Edge | Rodrigue Jean | Gérald Leblanc | Documentary | | |
| The Long Weekend | Pat Holden | Chris Klein, Brendan Fehr | Thriller | | |
| Looking for Angelina | Sergio Navarretta | Lina Giornofelice, Alvaro D’Antonio, Leslie Carlson | Crime drama | | |
| Love Is Work | John Kalangis | | Drama | | |
| Lucid | Sean Garrity | Jonas Chernick, Lindy Booth, Callum Keith Rennie, Michelle Nolden | Drama | | |
| Madagascar | Eric Darnell, Tom McGrath | Ben Stiller, Chris Rock, David Schwimmer, Jada Pinkett Smith | Computer-animated comedy | | |
| Maman Last Call | François Bouvier | Sophie Lorain, Patrick Huard, Julie Le Breton | Comedy-drama | | |
| Memory for Max, Claire, Ida and Company | Allan King | | Documentary | | |
| Metal: A Headbanger's Journey | Sam Dunn, Scot McFadyen & Jessica Wise | | Documentary | | |
| Midnight Movies: From the Margin to the Mainstream | Stuart Samuels | | Documentary | Direct to DVD | |
| Mohawk Girls | Tracey Deer | | National Film Board documentary | | |
| Munich | Steven Spielberg | Eric Bana, Daniel Craig, Ciarán Hinds, Mathieu Kassovitz, Hanns Zischler, Geoffrey Rush | Epic historical drama | | |
| Murder Unveiled | Vic Sarin | Anita Majumdar | Drama | Made for TV; based on the true story of Jaswinder Kaur Sidhu | |
| My Ancestors Were Rogues and Murderers | Anne Troake | Gary Troake | Documentary | A defense of the Canadian seal hunt | |
| Niagara Motel | Gary Yates | Caroline Dhavernas, Kevin Pollak, Anna Frield, Kris Holden-Reid, Craig Ferguson | Comedy-drama | | |
| Noise | Greg Spottiswood | Hugh Thompson, Cameron Lewis | Short drama | | |
| The Novena (La Neuvaine) | Bernard Émond | Élise Guilbault, Patrick Drolet | Drama | Prix Jutra – Actress (Guilbault) | |
| The Outlander (Le Survenant) | Érik Canuel | | Drama | | |
| The Peacekeepers | Paul Cowan | | National Film Board documentary | | |
| Perreault Dancer (Danser Perreault) | Tim Southam | | Documentary | | |
| Rahul's Arranged Marriage | Anant Mathur | Devika Mathur, Anurag Mathur | Romance, Drama, Short | | |
| Red (Le Rouge au sol) | Maxime Giroux | Martin Dubreuil | Short | Genie Award – Live-Action Short | |
| The River King | Nick Willing | Edward Burns, Jennifer Ehle, Thomas Gibson, Rachelle Lefevre, Jon Kapelos | Crime drama | Canada-U.K. co-production | |
| The Rocket (Maurice Richard) | Charles Binamé | Roy Dupuis, Stephen McHattie, Philip Craig, Patrice Robitaille, Rémy Girard, Julie Le Breton | Biodrama about Montreal Canadiens star, Maurice Richard | | |
| Ruzz and Ben (Ruzz et Ben) | Philippe Jullien | | Animated short | Canadian-French coproduction | |
| Sabah | Ruba Nadda | Arsinée Khanjian, Shawn Doyle, Jeff Seymour, David Alpay | Romance | | |
| Saint Martyrs of the Damned (Saints-Martyrs-des-Damnés) | Robin Aubert | | | | |
| Severed: Forest of the Dead | Carl Bessai | Paul Campbell, Sarah Lind, JR Bourne | Horror | | |
| Sidekick | Blake Van de Graaf | David Ingram | Thriller | | |
| Sigwan | Alanis Obomsawin | | Short drama | | |
| A Simple Curve | Aubrey Nealon | Kris Lemche, Michael Hogan, Matt Craven | Drama | | |
| Six Figures | David Christensen | JR Bourne, Caroline Cave | Thriller | | |
| There's a Flower in My Pedal | Andrea Dorfman | | Short | | |
| These Girls | John Hazlett | David Boreanaz, Caroline Dhavernas | Satire | | |
| Thieves of Innocence (Les Voleurs d'enfance) | Paul Arcand | | Documentary | | |
| Thralls | Ron Oliver | Lorenzo Lamas, Leah Cairns, Crystal Lowe | Horror | | |
| Tideland | Terry Gilliam | Jodelle Ferland, Jeff Bridges, Brendan Fletcher, Jennifer Tilly | Fantasy drama | Genie Award - Overall sound; Canada-U.K. co-production | |
| Tower Bawher | Theodore Ushev | | Animated short | | |
| Tuesday Morning...Somewhere (Mardi matin...quelque part) | Hélène Bélanger Martin | | Short drama | | |
| The United States of Albert (Les États-Unis d'Albert) | André Forcier | Éric Bruneau, Roy Dupuis, Céline Bonnier | Comedy-drama | | |
| Water | Deepa Mehta | Seema Biswas, Lisa Ray, John Abraham | Romance, Drama | Academy Award nominee for Best Foreign-Language film; Canada-India co-production | |
| Where the Truth Lies | Atom Egoyan | Colin Firth, Kevin Bacon, Alison Lohman, Rachel Blanchard | Drama based on the novel by Rupert Holmes | Genie Award – Adapted Screenplay; Canada-U.K. co-production | |
| The White Chapel (Une chapelle blanche) | Simon Lavoie | Hélène Loiselle | Short drama | Jutra Award winner for Best Live Action Short Film | |
| White Noise | Geoffrey Sax | Michael Keaton, Chandra West, Deborah Kara Unger, Ian McNeice | Supernatural thriller | Canada-U.K. co-production | |
| Who Shot My Brother? (Qui a tiré sur mon frère?) | German Gutierrez, Carmen Garcia | | Documentary | | |
| Whole New Thing | Amnon Buchbinder | Aaron Webber, Robert Joy, Rebecca Jenkins, Daniel MacIvor | Drama | | |
| Why We Fight | Eugene Jarecki | | Documentary | Canada-U.K.-France co-production made with U.S. financing | |
| Yule Croak (Petit Pow! Pow! Noël) | Robert Morin | Robert Morin, André Morin | Drama | | |
| A Year in the Death of Jack Richards | B. P. Paquette | Vlasta Vrána, Micheline Lanctôt | Drama | | |
| The Zero Sum | Raphael Assaf | | Drama | | |
| Zizek! | Astra Taylor | Slavoj Žižek | Documentary | Made with U.S. financing | |

== See also ==
- 2005 in Canada
- 2005 in Canadian television
