= 26th Genie Awards =

2006 Canadian film awards ceremony

- Date: March 13, 2006
- Site: Carlu theatre, Toronto
- Hosted by: Lisa Ray, Terry David Mulligan

Highlights
- Best Picture: C.R.A.Z.Y.

The 26th Genie Awards were held on March 13, 2006 to honour films released in 2005. The ceremony was held at The Carlu theatre in Toronto. The ceremony was hosted by Lisa Ray and Terry David Mulligan.

== Nominees and winners ==
The Genie Award winner in each category is shown in bold text.

| Motion Picture | Direction |
|---|---|
| **C.R.A.Z.Y.**, Pierre Even and Jean-Marc Vallée; Familia, Luc Déry; It's All Gone Pete Tong, Elizabeth Yake, Allan Niblo, James Richardson; Saint Ralph, Michael Souther, Teza Lawrence, Andrea Mann, Seaton McLean; Water, David Hamilton | **Jean-Marc Vallée, C.R.A.Z.Y.**; Louise Archambault, Familia; Michael Dowse, It's All Gone Pete Tong; Deepa Mehta, Water; Luc Picard, Audition (L'Audition) |
| Actor in a leading role | Actress in a leading role |
| **Michel Côté, C.R.A.Z.Y.**; Adam Butcher, Saint Ralph; Marc-André Grondin, C.R.A.Z.Y.; Paul Kaye, It's All Gone Pete Tong; Luc Picard, Audition (L'Audition) | **Seema Biswas, Water**; Gina Chiarelli, See Grace Fly; Macha Grenon, Familia; Arsinée Khanjian, Sabah; Sylvie Moreau, Familia |
| Actor in a supporting role | Actress in a supporting role |
| **Denis Bernard, Audition (L'Audition)**; Rémy Girard, Aurore; Gordon Pinsent, Saint Ralph; Campbell Scott, Saint Ralph; Bernard Starlight, Hank Williams First Nation | **Danielle Proulx, C.R.A.Z.Y.**; Babz Chula, Seven Times Lucky; Suzanne Clément, Audition (L'Audition); Marianne Fortier, Aurore; Micheline Lanctôt, Familia |
| Original Screenplay | Adapted Screenplay |
| **Jean-Marc Vallée and François Boulay, C.R.A.Z.Y.**; Louise Archambault, Familia; Michael Dowse, It's All Gone Pete Tong; Deepa Mehta, Water; Luc Picard, Audition (L'Audition) | **Atom Egoyan, Where the Truth Lies**; Diane Cailhier, The Outlander (Le Survenant); David Christensen, Six Figures; Luc Dionne, Aurore; Nathalie Petrowski, Maman Last Call |
| Best Live Action Short Drama | Best Animated Short |
| **David Ostry and Matthew Cervi, Milo 55160**; Carl Laudan, The Big Thing; Greg Spottiswood, Jason Charters and Liam Romalis, Noise; Simon Olivier Fecteau, Guillaume Lespérance and Jean-François Lord, The Remaining Days (Les Derniers jours); Hélène Bélanger Martin and Antonello Cozzolino, Tuesday Morning...Somewhere (Mardi matin...quelque part) | **Christopher Hinton and Michael Fukushima, cNote**; Patrick Bouchard and Michèle Bélanger, Dehors novembre; Philippe Julien, Marcel Jean and Jean-Pierre Lemouland, Ruzz and Ben (Ruzz et Ben) |
| Art Direction/Production Design | Cinematography |
| **Patrice Vermette, C.R.A.Z.Y.**; Phillip Barker and Cal Loucks, Where the Truth Lies; Dilip Mehta, Water; Michel Proulx, Aurore; Deanne Rohde, Ricardo Alms and Shawna Balas, Seven Times Lucky | **Giles Nuttgens, Water**; Balasz Bolygo, It's All Gone Pete Tong; Bernard Couture, The Outlander (Le Survenant); Pierre Mignot, C.R.A.Z.Y.; André Turpin, Familia |
| Costume Design | Editing |
| **Ginette Magny, C.R.A.Z.Y.**; Dolly Ahluwalia, Water; Francesca Chamberland, Aurore; Francesca Chamberland, The Outlander (Le Survenant); Anne Dixon, Saint Ralph | **Paul Jutras, C.R.A.Z.Y.**; Jeremy Peter Allen, Manners of Dying; Stuart Gazzard, It's All Gone Pete Tong; Colin Monie, Water; Susan Shipton, Where the Truth Lies |
| Overall Sound | Sound Editing |
| **Yvon Benoît, Daniel Bisson, Luc Boudrias and Bernard Gariépy Strobl, C.R.A.Z.Y.**; Greg Stewart, Michael McCann and Michael Thomas, It's All Gone Pete Tong; Daniel Pellerin, John Hazen, Jan Rudy and Bisa Skecic, Lie With Me; Leon Johnson, Bruce Little and Howard Rissin, Seven Times Lucky; Chris Munro, John Hazen, Daniel Pellerin and Jan Rudy, Where the Truth Lies | **Martin Pinsonnault, Mira Mailhot, Simon Meilleur, Mireille Morin and Jean-François Sauvé, C.R.A.Z.Y.**; Olivier Calvert, Diane Boucher, Simon Meilleur, Francine Poirier and Jean-François Sauvé, Audition (L'Audition); Michael McCann, Chester Bialowas, Tony Gort, Roger Morris and Michael Thomas, It's All Gone Pete Tong; Bruce Little and Russ Dyck, Seven Times Lucky; Alice Wright, Valéry Dufort-Boucher, Alexis Farand, Jacques Plante and Christian Rivest, The Outlander (Le Survenant) |
| Achievement in Music: Original Score | Achievement in Music: Original Song |
| **Mychael Danna, Water**; Geoff Bennett, Longo Hai and Ben Johannesen, Sabah; Mychael Danna, Where the Truth Lies; Éric Pfalzgraf, Manners of Dying; Byron Wong, Lie With Me | **Glenn Buhr and Margaret Sweatman, "When Wintertime" — Seven Times Lucky**; Sylvain Cossette, Michel Corriveau and Robert Marchand, "Comme un plume au vent" — The Outlander (Le Survenant); Matt Murphy and Michael Mabbott, "Just a Show" — The Life and Hard Times of Guy Terrifico; Matt Murphy and Michael Mabbott, "Make Believe" — The Life and Hard Times of Guy Terrifico; Daniel Bélanger, "Tourner" — Audition (L'Audition) |
| Documentary | Special awards |
| **Velcrow Ripper, Tracey Friesen, Cari Green and Harry Sutherland, Scared Sacred**; Paul Arcand and Denise Robert, Thieves of Innocence (Les Voleurs d'enfance) | Claude Jutra Award: **Louise Archambault, Familia**; Golden Reel Award: **C.R.A.Z.Y.** |
