= The Lake (TV series) =

2022 Canadian comedy television series

- Genre: Comedy
- Created by: Julian Doucet
- Starring: Jordan Gavaris; Julia Stiles; Madison Shamoun
- Country of origin: Canada
- Original language: English
- No. of seasons: 2
- No. of episodes: 16

Production
- Executive producers: Julian Doucet; Michael Souther; Teza Lawrence; Paul Fox
- Production location: North Bay, Ontario
- Running time: 27–36 minutes
- Production company: Amaze Film + Television

Original release
- Network: Amazon Prime Video
- Release: June 17, 2022 – June 9, 2023

The Lake is a Canadian comedy television series created by Julian Doucet for Amazon Prime Video. The series was Amazon's first scripted Canadian Amazon Original series, and premiered on June 17, 2022. In advance of the official series premiere, the first two episodes received a preview screening at the 2022 Inside Out Film and Video Festival. In July 2022, the series was renewed for a second season, which premiered on June 9, 2023. On January 6, 2024, Jordan Gavaris announced The Lake was not renewed for a third season.

== Premise ==
After returning from abroad following a breakup with his long-term partner, Justin plans to connect with his teenage daughter he gave up for adoption. His plans to make new memories with her at the family cottage go awry when he discovers his parents left it to his picture-perfect stepsister, Maisy-May.

== Cast ==
- Jordan Gavaris as Justin, a gay man returning from abroad to reconnect with his birth daughter, Billie. In an effort to bond with her, Justin brings her to the lake where he spent most of his childhood summers.
- Julia Stiles as Maisy-May, Justin's picture-perfect stepsister. Conniving and ambitious, she inherited the family's lake cabin from her stepfather, to Justin's surprise and dismay.
- Madison Shamoun as Billie, Justin's city-loving teenage birth daughter whom he gave up for adoption. Billie is mixed-race: her mother is a Black woman and her father white.
- Jared Scott as Killian (season 1), Maisy's and Victor's eldest son and Billie's love interest. Like Billie, Killian is mixed-race and has some understanding of what it feels like to be an outsider.
- Terry Chen as Victor Lin, a Chinese-Canadian ex-pro hockey player, married to Maisy-May. Like his wife, Victor is ambitious and shows no hesitation to manipulate those around him to ensure his family succeeds.
- Travis Nelson as Riley, a local artist, handyman, and store operator who is Justin's love interest.
- Natalie Lisinska as Jayne, friend and sometime minion of Maisy, whom Maisy has passively bullied since their teen years.
- Jon Dore as Wayne, Jayne's often clueless husband. Wayne is immature and a man-child but has genuine affection for his wife and daughters.
- Carolyn Scott as Ulrika, a cabin owner of Swedish descent who grows cannabis that she shares with some community members.
- Declan Whaley as Opal Lin, Maisy's and Victor's younger child who is genderqueer and identifies with Justin.
- Emily Roman as Jeri Moore, Jayne's and Wayne's daughter who is the middle child of triplets and most like Jayne.

== Episodes ==
| Season | Episodes | Originally released |
|---|---|---|
| 1 | 8 | June 17, 2022 |
| 2 | 8 | June 9, 2023 |

=== Season 1 (2022) ===
| No. overall | No. in season | Title | Directed by | Written by | Original release date |
|---|---|---|---|---|---|
| 1 | 1 | "Tilt-a-Grrl" | Paul Fox | Julian Doucet | June 17, 2022 |
| 2 | 2 | "Game Night" | Paul Fox | Andrew De Angelis | June 17, 2022 |
| 3 | 3 | "Picnic at Raven's Rock" | Paul Fox | Lisa Codrington | June 17, 2022 |
| 4 | 4 | "The Simplex Solution" | Paul Fox | Vivian Lin | June 17, 2022 |
| 5 | 5 | "Mommy Queerest" | Jordan Canning | Julian Doucet & Lori-Ann Russell | June 17, 2022 |
| 6 | 6 | "Midsommar Madness" | Jordan Canning | Andrew De Angelis & Kaveh Mohebbi | June 17, 2022 |
| 7 | 7 | "Trust Issues" | Jordan Canning | Winter Tekenos-Levy | June 17, 2022 |
| 8 | 8 | "No White After Labor Day" | Jordan Canning | Julian Doucet | June 17, 2022 |

=== Season 2 (2023) ===
| No. overall | No. in season | Title | Directed by | Written by | Original release date |
|---|---|---|---|---|---|
| 9 | 1 | "Two Become Run" | Paul Fox | Julian Doucet | June 9, 2023 |
| 10 | 2 | "A Berry Special Episode" | Paul Fox | Andrew De Angelis | June 9, 2023 |
| 11 | 3 | "Crazy-May" | Melanie Orr | Gorrman Lee | June 9, 2023 |
| 12 | 4 | "Wet Cup American Summer" | Melanie Orr | Kaveh Mohebbi | June 9, 2023 |
| 13 | 5 | "Angel Tits and Dirty Bananas" | Paul Fox | Lisa Codrington | June 9, 2023 |
| 14 | 6 | "Dying to Know" | R. T. Thorne | Winter Tekenos-Levy | June 9, 2023 |
| 15 | 7 | "Tour De Force" | R. T. Thorne | Andrew De Angelis & Billie Fishleigh | June 9, 2023 |
| 16 | 8 | "Death on Denial" | Paul Fox | Julian Doucet & Lori-Ann Russell | June 9, 2023 |

== Production ==
=== Development ===
In early August 2021, Amazon ordered its first scripted Canadian Amazon Original series, The Lake. Julian Doucet serves as writer and executive producer, with Michael Souther and Teza Lawrence also executive producing under their production company Amaze Film + Television. In May 2022, Jordan Canning and Paul Fox were revealed as directors. On July 13, 2022, Amazon renewed the series for a second season.

The plot is based in part on the real-life experiences of series creator Julian Doucet.

=== Casting ===
With the series announcement, Jordan Gavaris, Julia Stiles, and Madison Shamoun were cast as the leads. Jon Dore, Carolyn Scott, Natalie Lisinska, Travis Nelson, Declan Whaley, and Terry Chen were also cast. Lauren Holly as Mimsy, Max Amani, and Jhaleil Swaby have joined the second season.

=== Filming ===
Filming began on August 5, 2021 in North Bay, Ontario, Canada. Filming wrapped on September 1, 2021. The second season began production on August 15, 2022 and wrapped on September 29, 2022 in North Bay, Ontario.

== Reception ==
For the first season, the review aggregator website Rotten Tomatoes reported a 63% approval score with an average rating of 5.3/10 based on 8 reviews.

== Release ==
The first season of The Lake premiered on Amazon Prime Video on June 17, 2022. The second season premiered on June 9, 2023.
