= Brenda Kamino =

Canadian actress, writer, director, teacher and painter

- Born: November 6, 1951 (age 74)
- Occupations: Actress, teacher, writer, director and painter
- Years active: 1977–present

Brenda Kamino CM is a Canadian actress, teacher, writer, director and painter. She is best known for playing Dot Yasuda in the TV series Carter.

== Early life ==
She started acting in a high school production of Antigone, and performed at McMaster University with Martin Short, Eugene Levy and Dave Thomas in Frankenstein, A Rock Musical written by Thomas and his brother Ian Thomas.

== Career ==
Kamino's first professional appearances were in 1977, as an extra in the CBC film Bethune, and in the Toronto Open Circle Theatre's production of The Primary English Class, by Israel Horovitz. The play toured other Canadian cities during 1977 and 1978.

Other stage plays in which Kamino has performed include Yellow Fever by R. A. Shiomi (1983); Bachelor Man for Theatre Passe Muraille in Toronto (1987), in which she played Queenie, an aging prostitute with bound feet; the Dora-nominated Naomi's Road for Young People's Theatre (1992); M Butterfly (1993); Mom, Dad, I'm Living with a White Girl by Marty Chan (1995); Rashomon and The Simpleton of the Unexpected Isles at the 1996 Shaw Festival; Dreams of Blonde and Blue by M. J. Kang, Theatre Passe Muraille (2002); Suicide Notes (2004); Nisei Blue by Mieko Ouchi (2011); Ching Chong Chinaman by Lauren Yee (2013); and Bystanders by David Levine (2015), a solo performance. In an article previewing the 2004 Summerworks called "Artists to Watch", NOW magazine writers Jon Kaplan and Glenn Sumi noted: "Kamino's seen way too infrequently onstage, so her grounded, thoughtful approach to acting should heat up this look at life, language and limits".

She has made many television appearances, including in Lost Girl, Degrassi: The Next Generation, recurring roles in Train 48, Kung Fu: The Legend Continues, E.N.G. and Street Legal; children’s shows Fred Penner's Place and Mr. Dressup; and the TV movies Befriend and Betray, Ultra and Hotel Babylon.

Kamino had a recurring role as Dot Yasuda in the TV series Carter (2018). In January 2019, it was announced that Carter was renewed for a second season by WGN in the US and CTV Drama (formerly Bravo) in Canada. Season 2 of Carter premiered on September 25, 2019 in Canada.

Films she has appeared in include I've Heard the Mermaids Singing (1987), Zero Patience (1993), and The Glass Castle (2017).

Kamino produces theatre with Canadian playwright and actor Andrew Moodie for their company Renaissance Canadian Theatre Company, dedicated to finding scripts that deserve a second chance at life in the Canadian theatre scene.

In 2005, Kamino received the Canadian Actors' Equity Association's Larry McCance Award "for her work on cultural diversity". For more than two decades, she did artistic and administrative work in theatre, film and TV, advocating for accessibility and equity in the arts. Among the groups she worked with were Canadian Actors' Equity, Theatre Ontario and the Ontario Arts Council.

In 2026, she was named as a member of the Order of Canada.
