= Unsub (TV series) =

American television series

- Created by: David J. Burke; Stephen Kronish
- Developed by: Stephen J. Cannell
- Written by: Michael Berlin; David J. Burke; Stephen J. Cannell; Eric Estrin; Stephen Kronish; Joe Menosky; Gene Miller; Randall Wallace
- Directed by: Bill Corcoran; Corey Allen; James A. Contner; William A. Fraker; Jim Johnston; Jorge Montesi; Gus Trikonis; Reynaldo Villalobos
- Starring: David Soul; M. Emmet Walsh; Kent McCord; Andrea Mann; Jennifer Hetrick; Richard Kind; Joe Maruzzo
- Composer: Mike Post
- Country of origin: United States
- Original language: English
- No. of seasons: 1
- No. of episodes: 8

Production
- Executive producer: David J. Burke
- Producers: Stephen J. Cannell; John Peter Kousakis; Jo Swerling, Jr.
- Production locations: Vancouver, British Columbia, Canada
- Cinematography: Francis Kenny
- Running time: 44 minutes
- Production company: Stephen J. Cannell Productions

Original release
- Network: NBC
- Release: February 3 – April 14, 1989

Unsub is an American television series that aired on NBC from February 3 to April 14, 1989. The series revolves around an elite FBI forensic team that investigates serial murderers and other violent crimes. Unsub is an abbreviation for the "unknown subject" of an investigation.

== Cast ==
- David Soul as John Westley "Wes" Grayson
- M. Emmet Walsh as Ned Platt
- Kent McCord as Alan McWhirter
- Andrea Mann as Norma McWhirter
- Jennifer Hetrick as Ann Madison
- Richard Kind as Jimmy Bello
- Joe Maruzzo as Tony D'Agostino

== Episodes ==
No.	Title	Directed by	Written by	Original release date	Viewers (millions)
1	"White Bone Demon"	Corey Allen	Stephen J. Cannell	February 3, 1989	18.1
A psychotic serial killer (Paul Guilfoyle), driven to kill by nightmarish visions of a skull-like face, is running amok in East Harbor, Connecticut.
2	"Silent Stalker"	William A. Fraker	David J. Burke	February 10, 1989	15.8
The team trains a potential new member (Patricia Charbonneau) while dealing with a child predator (John Snyder) in Gastown, British Columbia.
3	"Clean Slate"	Jim Johnston	Joe Menosky	February 17, 1989	15.9
A cleanliness-obsessed bomber (Kevin Spacey) is terrorizing Seattle, and one of his victims is Tony's young goddaughter, Gina.
4	"Daddy Dearest"	Reynaldo Villalobos	Stephen Kronish	March 4, 1989	22.1
Men are being found strangled and castrated in Belford, New Jersey. The prime suspect turns out to be a female cop.
5	"And They Swam Right Over the Dam"	Jorge Montesi	Michael Berlin & Eric Estrin	March 10, 1989	14.6
Couples are turning up dead in Columbus, Ohio. The key to solving the homicides may lay with a young boy named Jeffrey.
6	"And the Dead Shall Rise to Condemn Thee: Part 1"	Gus Trikonis	Story by : Anthony J. Schembri; Teleplay by : Randall Wallace	March 31, 1989	12.9
A desperate mother asks Wes to help find her missing daughters, who were last seen in the company of a charismatic preacher named Bishop Grace.
7	"And the Dead Shall Rise to Condemn Thee: Part 2"	Gus Trikonis	Story by : Anthony J. Schembri; Teleplay by : Randall Wallace	April 7, 1989	14.4
Wes becomes recklessly obsessed in his pursuit of Bishop Grace.
8	"Burn Out"	James A. Contner	Gene Miller	April 14, 1989	13.4
While Wes and Tony work to justify the expenses of the CPU at Capitol Hill, Ann and Ned look for an escalating arsonist in Haynesville, North Carolina.

== Home media ==
On July 27, 2010, Mill Creek Entertainment released Prime Time Crime: The Stephen J. Cannell Collection on DVD in Region 1. This collection contains 54 episodes from 13 different shows produced by Stephen J. Cannell Productions, including all eight episodes of Unsub.
