= Score: A Hockey Musical =

- Theatrical release poster
- Directed by: Michael McGowan
- Screenplay by: Michael McGowan
- Produced by: Jody Colero; Avi Federgreen; Richard Hanet; Michael McGowan
- Starring: Noah Reid; Allie MacDonald; Olivia Newton-John; Marc Jordan; Nelly Furtado
- Cinematography: Rudoloph Blahacek
- Edited by: Roderick Deogrades
- Distributed by: Mongrel Media
- Release dates: 9 September 2010 (TIFF); 22 October 2010 (Canada)
- Running time: 92 minutes
- Country: Canada
- Language: English

Score: A Hockey Musical is a 2010 Canadian coming-of-age musical comedy film written and directed by Michael McGowan starring Noah Reid, Allie MacDonald, Olivia Newton-John, Marc Jordan and Nelly Furtado. The story follows a sheltered, pacifistic teenager who becomes a star player in a violent junior ice hockey league.

The film opened five international film festivals in September 2010 leading up to the 2010–11 NHL season. It was generally seen as a crowd-pleaser and a campy celebration of Canadiana, but some critics faulted the populist effort as having little or no cinematic merit. It was nominated for two Directors Guild of Canada Awards and an ACTRA Award.

== Background ==
Ice hockey is Canada's national winter sport and has been connected to Canadian nationalism since the country's early history. The violent and aggressive style of hockey separated it from sports of Europe and the United States, and Canadians took ownership of the sport which was seen to display a stoic, courageous and dominant masculinity of First Nations cultures and early Canadian settlers. While Canadians later developed an international reputation of being polite and peaceful, (Note: A 2000 study found a strong stereotype of Canadians as the least aggressive people from amongst nine English-speaking countries.) ice hockey remained a forum in which violence is embraced.

While there is little violence in informal pick-up games where players may not use protective equipment, occurrences of fighting increase with the player's age and the level of competition. From around ages 12 to 14, players tend to either drop out of competitive leagues or become socialized into the culture of violence. Such players consider fistfights to be "sticking up for oneself", an obligatory and self-defensive response to intimidation. Failure to decisively respond to intimidation can cause the player to lose face, be targeted by further intimidation, and become distracted from the game. Within hockey culture, unwritten rules regarding hockey fights are known as "the code". (Note: The unwritten code of conduct in hockey fights exists to avoid serious injury and ensure fair fights which do not escalate into bench-clearing brawls. It includes practices such as throwing down stick and gloves (and in cases helmet) when challenging an opponent or accepting a challenge; stopping a fight when one fighter falls; that enforcers should not fight an opponent smaller than themselves; and that "turtling" – covering up without throwing a punch – is dishonorable.)

== Synopsis ==
While playing pick-up hockey at his local outdoor rink, seventeen-year-old Farley Gordon resoundingly defeats a competitive player who challenges him ("Darryl vs. The Kid"). Farley meets his neighbour Eve, who is also homeschooled and sheltered. While Farley sees their relationship as platonic, Eve has secretly developed romantic feelings for him ("Best Friends").

Refuting his parents' concerns that hockey is too rough ("Frozen Toe"), Farley returns to the rink where he meets Walt Acorn, owner of junior ice hockey team the Brampton Blades. (Note: Junior ice hockey is for players aged 15–20. The Brampton Capitals (1984–2012) was among the most successful teams in the Ontario Junior Hockey League, with a home stadium on Brampton's shared townline with Toronto.) Acorn tries to recruit Farley but his parents are opposed, expressing their perspective through the folk song "Hugs". Farley discusses it with Eve and decides to attend a Blades practice ("Give it a Shot"). Coach Donker is unimpressed with Farley, who twice dekes through the defence to score but is then knocked out by a violent bodycheck from enforcer Moose. Donker warns that Farley does not have the skills to defend himself ("Buck 55").

The following day during warmups, rival enforcers start a bench-clearing brawl. Late to arrive, Farley has difficulty comprehending the spectacle which he is told is part of the game ("Kraft Dinner"). Farley is given the first face-off and scores in six seconds, collecting four goals and two assists by the end of the game. Farley is celebrated, but his parents still do not appreciate hockey ("Baboons"). Farley receives increasing media attention with successive games, while his teammates champion and protect him. However, he misses practices to volunteer with Eve, and Donker does not know how to make him treat the sport as more than a game ("Donker's Dilemma").

Farley engages in male bonding rituals with the team ("Boyfriends"), receives endorsement deals and is considered a contender for first draft pick. He becomes jealous when he sees Eve being taught to ice skate by her concert partner Marco, though Farley attracts puck bunnies. An imagined slight leads to a bench-clearing brawl, and Donker orders everyone to pick an opponent. Frustrated at having allowed a hat trick, the opposing goaltender charges Farley who ducks and covers, taking a few punches until the brawl ends in stunned silence at this disgrace. (Note: Turtling – adopting a prone position and covering up without throwing a punch – is considered highly dishonourable as (1) the player does not answer the challenge to fight, and (2) it may appear that the player is trying to draw a penalty against the opponent for being the lone instigator in a non-mutual fight.) After being reprimanded by Donker, the team tell Farley how "the code" is inherently tied to their sense of masculinity and honour. They warn that if Farley does not fight back, opponents will think they can attack him with impunity. Failing to fight is also separating him from the brotherhood of the team ("Pacifism Defence"). The media turn against Farley, his endorsement deals are withdrawn, he suffers more hits on the ice and his goals are met with booing. Farley considers abandoning his pacifism and talks with Eve, but becomes frustrated when he sees a gift from Marco and realizes he forgot her birthday. His parents encourage him to quit the team ("Ordinary Boy").

Farley witnesses Marco making an advance on Eve and realizes his feelings for her. The neighbourhood hockey players encourage Farley to confess his feelings to Eve ("Boy in the Bubble"). However, when he sees Eve outside their homes, he accuses her of lying about Marco ("Dead and Done"). The pressure builds on Farley and when goaltender Jean-Luc challenges him, Farley fights him. Immediately afterward, Farley walks away from the game and the team, feeling that he has lost his identity ("Toe to Toe").

Farley tries to make sense of his life. He goes to the empty Blades arena at night where he has a vision of Walter Gretzky, Theo Fleury and other hockey personalities and decides to find his own way to express heroism ("Legends"). Farley apologizes to Eve and they confess their feelings for each other ("Eve's a Goddess").

Farley rejoins the team. His teammates accept his pacifism but remain concerned that opponents will target him. At the next game, Farley is immediately challenged, dodges a few swings, then pins his opponent's arms in a bear hug until the other player surrenders from embarrassment. Farley wins back the crowd and there is a spontaneous celebration of the sport ("Hockey, The Greatest Game in the Land").

== Cast ==
- Noah Reid as Farley Gordon
- Allie MacDonald as Eve
- Olivia Newton-John as Hope Gordon
- Marc Jordan as Edgar Gordon
- Nelly Furtado as an ardent hockey fan
- Stephen McHattie as Walt Acorn
- K. Trevor Wilson as shirtless fan
- John Pyper-Ferguson as Coach Donker
- John Robinson as Ace, the assistant coach
- Dru Viergever as Moose, the Blades enforcer
- Chris Ratz as Maurice
- George Stroumboulopoulos as an arena announcer
- Evan Solomon as himself
- Brandon Firla as Don Mohan, an executive with Icing International Management
- Gianpaolo Venuta as Marco, a concert pianist
- Steve Kouleas as himself
- Wesley Morgan as a sensitive player
- Marc Trottier as Jean Luc, the Braces goalie
- Paul O'Sullivan as a doctor
- Walter Gretzky as himself
- Theo Fleury as himself
- John McDermott as himself
- Hawksley Workman as Gump
- Thomas Mitchell as Darryl

== Production ==
=== Writing and development ===
Director Michael McGowan wrote the script. Music had been integral to his previous film, One Week, and he decided to go further in that direction with a musical. While developing ideas in January 2009, he thought he could find humour by setting the musical in hockey culture. The project was developed under the working title Hockey: The Musical. (Note: Not to be confused with two theatrical plays also titled Hockey: The Musical – one of which premiered at the Toronto Fringe Festival in July 2008 and another which premiered in Detroit in May 2016.)

McGowan took some inspiration from musical film Once, the duet in Juno and the closing dance number in Slumdog Millionaire. McGowan wrote the lyrics so that the songs advanced the narrative and worked with Canadian composers to set them to music. Farley wears jersey 14, in recognition of one of McGowan's favourite hockey players, Maple Leafs centre Dave Keon, a hall-of-fame professional who won the Lady Byng Memorial Trophy for two consecutive seasons as most gentlemanly player.

Dance scenes were choreographed by Amy Wright. McGowan wanted to convey humour with the dancing hockey players and wanted them to be a little awkward and imperfect. Instead of employing figure skaters, Wright found ballet, jazz and hip-hop dancers who had a background in ice hockey. Months were spent to ensure the songs and choreography worked for the film.

=== Casting ===
Executive producer Jody Colero knew singer-songwriter Jordan and brought him in for the father role. Jordan's wife, Amy Sky, was friends with Olivia Newton-John (Note: Sky produced four of Newton-John's CDs.) and sent her the script. McGowan considered it a "casting coup" when the pop music icon agreed to co-star in the film, which also encouraged international sales. Jordan hadn't acted since a short period with The Groundlings. He credited scene partner Newton-John for helping him feel comfortable in the role.

McGowan expected to have difficulty casting the lead, but Reid was their first audition and satisfied the director with his acting, skating and singing. Reid's audition included some one-on-one play with McGowan at the Upper Canada College hockey rink. The biggest casting challenge proved to be the role of Eve, for which McGowan made a national search, finding that MacDonald could portray the "combination of innocence and quirkiness" that he sought for the role. Reid and MacDonald each had a background in musical theatre and each played hockey as children, Reid advancing to U14 select league (Note: Ontario select league is a competitive developmental minor ice hockey league for children aged 9–17, supplementing house league play.) for a year. Having played guitar from childhood, MacDonald undertook intensive training for the cello which was a mental and physical challenge.

The cast also includes singer-songwriters Nelly Furtado and Hawksley Workman, and cameos by Walter Gretzky and retired professional hockey player Theo Fleury.

=== Financing and filming ===
The film was produced by McGowan and Avi Federgreen through Mulmar Feed Company with executive producers Jody Colero for music studio Silent Joe and Richard Hanet for distributor Mongrel Media. The production had a budget of $5.3 million. It received financing from Telefilm Canada ($2.2 million), the Ontario Media Development Corporation, the Harold Greenberg Fund, tax credits, a distributor advance, and broadcast licenses from CBC Television and The Movie Network. Additional funding was raised through embedded marketing, placing corporate logos on the boards of the hockey rink. The project was greenlit in November 2009.

It was filmed in the Greater Toronto Area over 25 days between 1 February and 8 March 2010. It was filmed by cinematographer Rudolf Blahacek using a Red One digital camera with a Fujinon Premier PL 18–85 T2.0 zoom lens. Locations include the Art Gallery of Ontario, the skating rink at Nathan Phillips Square, an ice rink in Wychwood Park, a Brampton Transit bus, and Weston Arena in northwest Toronto. The 60-year-old arena was booked in November 2009, and redressed for the fictitious history of the Brampton Blades. Filming in the arena began before sunrise to make the most of their limited ice time. McGowan wore knee-height snowmobile boots to insulate himself from the ice, while Reid noted that his feet were "chewed up" from the last two weeks of performing six hours a day in hockey skates.

Tamara Deverell served as production designer with costumes designed by Patrick Antosh. The film was edited by Roderick Deogrades to 92 minutes.

=== Music ===
For most of the songs, McGowan wrote the lyrics with the music composed by Marco DiFelice. Other contributors include Marc Jordan, Hawksley Workman, Barenaked Ladies, Newton-John, and Amy Sky. DiFelice and Jody Colero supervised the film's soundtrack at Silent Joe studio. In an interview, McGowan noted that the lyrics are often "absurd" and "over the top on purpose ... tongue firmly in cheek". In most cases the lyrics are speech-sung.

The soundtrack Score: A Hockey Musical was released on 19 October 2010 with "Hockey, the Greatest Game in the Land" available as a digital single on 16 October. The soundtrack contains 21 tracks:

SCORE: A Hockey Musical (original soundtrack)
No.	Title	Writer(s)	Performed by	Length
1.	"O Hockey Canada" (O Canada)	Marco DiFelice, Jonathan Goldsmith and Michael McGowan	John McDermott and Canadian Children's Opera Company	1:18
2.	"Darryl vs. The Kid"	Barenaked Ladies and McGowan	Dave Bidini, Thomas Mitchell, Noah Reid, Hawksley Workman	1:32
3.	"Best Friends"	DiFelice, Emilie Mover, Benjamin Pinkerton and McGowan	Allie MacDonald and Reid	2:02
4.	"Frozen Toe"	DiFelice, Pinkerton, and McGowan	Mark Jordan, Olivia Newton-John and Reid	1:35
5.	"Hugs"	Olivia Newton-John, Amy Sky and Marc Jordan	Jordan and Newton-John	3:33
6.	"Give it a Shot"	DiFelice, Pinkerton and McGowan	MacDonald and Reid	1:28
7.	"Buck 55"	DiFelice, Pinkerton and McGowan	John Pyper-Ferguson, Reid, and John Robinson	1:09
8.	"Kraft Dinner"	DiFelice, Pinkerton and McGowan	Jordan, MacDonald, Stephen McHattie, Newton-John and Reid	2:04
9.	"Baboons"	DiFelice, Jody Colero, Alexander Andresen and McGowan	Jordan, MacDonald, Newton-John and Reid	1:32
10.	"Donker's Dilemma"	DiFelice, Pinkerton and McGowan	McHattie, Pyper-Ferguson and Robinson	1:04
11.	"Boyfriends"	DiFelice, Brent Barkman, Colero and McGowan	Jordan, Newton-John, Chris Ratz, Reid, and Dru Viergever	2:44
12.	"Pacifism Defence"	DiFelice, Pinkerton and McGowan	Ratz, Reid and Viergever	3:22
13.	"Ordinary Boy"	DiFelice, Ryan Corrigan and McGowan	Jordan, Newton-John and Reid	1:43
14.	"Boy in the Bubble"	DiFelice, Corrigan and McGowan	Bidini, Reid and Workman	2:25
15.	"Dead and Done"	DiFelice, Corrigan and McGowan	MacDonald and Reid	1:54
16.	"Toe to Toe"	DiFelice, Corrigan and McGowan	Nelly Furtado, Jordan, McHattie, Wesley Morgan, Newton-John, Pyper-Ferguson, Reid, Robinson, Marc Trottier	3:26
17.	"Legends"	DiFelice, Benjamin, Pinkerton, Jordan and McGowan	Theo Fleury, Walter Gretzky, Jordan, Newton-John, Paul O'Sullivan, Reid	6:13
18.	"Eve's a Goddess"	DiFelice, Corrigan, Amy Sky and McGowan	MacDonald and Reid	3:47
19.	"Hockey, The Greatest Game in the Land" (Movie Version)	DiFelice, Pinkerton, Colero and McGowan	Brandon Firla, Furtado, Jordan, MacDonald, McHattie, Morgan, Newton-John, Pyper-Ferguson, Ratz, Reid, Trottier, Viergever	5:20
20.	"Time Stand Still"	Geddy Lee, Alex Lifeson and Neil Peart	Nelly Furtado	3:46
21.	"Hockey, The Greatest Game in the Land" (Radio Edit)	DiFelice, Pinkerton, Colero and McGowan	Hawksley Workman	3:24
Total length:				55:21

Portions of "Sometimes When We Touch" by Dan Hill is sung in the film by actors Reid and Gianpaolo Venuta but the song does not appear on the soundtrack.

Furtado's cover of Rush's "Time Stand Still" was recognized as an iTunes Hot Track for the third week of October 2010.

== Themes and analysis ==
National Post film critic Jay Stone noted how the film questions Canadian identity. From the documentary-style opening montage (in which men, women and children are shown playing ice hockey and street hockey on a multitude of playing surfaces and environments, while the song "O Hockey Canada" is played) to the rousing closing number "Hockey, the Greatest Game in the Land" (with the entire cast dancing in a hockey rink and declaring "we are proud Canadians") ice hockey is established as a national pastime and an important part of the culture of Canada. A screening of the film at the Museum of Modern Art considered the "bipolar Canadian condition" between the frequent violence of ice hockey and the generally nonaggressive attitudes of Canadians. Other aspects of Canadiana are compared and contrasted with the obsession of the national sport:

Hockey without fighting is like Kraft Dinner without cheese.
It's still pasta, but the palate it won't please.
– excerpt from "Kraft Dinner"

The film also draws attention to gender stereotypes in hockey and examines images of masculinity through Farley's journey. When he shows himself unprepared for full contact hockey, Donker urges him to quit playing and become a figure skater (Note: Figure skating has become seen as a "Girls' sport", with male participants of questionable masculinity.) or a fan, giving him a pink Blades T-shirt. On road trips with the team, Farley takes part in locker room towel snapping, pyroflatulence and writing names in the snow via urination. His association with this hyper-masculinity culminates in a semi-nude advertising campaign dubbed "The New Macho", which is predicated on his projected image of masculinity – an image which collapses due to the ultimate disgrace of turtling. Due to his rejection of the team's masculine norms, Farley's hockey skates are given a "girlie" makeover in reflective gold with rhinestones. Having noted how a teammate recoiled from a hug, Farley's game-changing solution of a bear-hug subverts the hypermasculine expectations of fighting while displaying the physical strength, prowess, and dominance epitomized by the sport.

The Globe and Mail film critic Rick Groen noted that Score raised interesting questions regarding the intersection of culture and art. While Farley weighs intellectual pursuits against his athletic talent, his girlfriend counsels him (in song): "You should follow your heart / But everybody knows that hockey's not art." Groen holds that any sport played at its highest levels has instances of "pure artistry", and that the formal arts in Canada have tried to emulate the performance and drama of hockey games. The controversy over fighting in hockey games then speaks to the wider issue of "whether to pander to the masses at the expense of 'artistic' purity." Groen found it ironic that such pandering by the filmmakers undercut the message of valuing non-conformist artistic athleticism. He also found the metaphor was carried in the film's selection at festivals, which sought to balance populism and commerce with art.

== Release ==
The film was aggressively marketed, with regular casting announcements for the many cameos.

The film premiered at the 2010 Toronto International Film Festival on 9 September as the first film of its opening night gala at Roy Thompson Hall, introduced by Canadian Heritage Minister James Moore. The film subsequently opened the Atlantic International Film Festival (AIFF) on 16 September, Cinéfest Sudbury International Film Festival on 18 September, the Calgary International Film Festival (CIFF) on 23 September and the Edmonton International Film Festival (EIFF) on 24 September. (Note: The September film festival openings led toward the official launch of the 2010–11 NHL season on 7 October with the Toronto Maple Leafs vs the Montreal Canadiens.) It was also shown at the anniversary gala of the 35th Vancouver International Film Festival (VIFF) on 9 October.

The film was rated PG in Canada and distributed through Mongrel Media. It was released in theatres in Canada on 22 October with a wide release of 120 screens. The film ranked 13th for box office receipts in Canada on its opening weekend.

The film's international premiere was in New York City on 18 March 2011 as part of the Canadian Front showcase at the Museum of Modern Art (MoMA). It was the second opening film at the Minneapolis–Saint Paul International Film Festival on 14 April. (Note: 2011's largest international film festival in the US, MSPIFF screened 190 films over 22 days and had three simultaneously screened opening films: documentary Page One: Inside the New York Times, musical comedy Score, and found-footage horror Trollhunter.) The film was distributed internationally by New Films International. The film's Asian premiere was in June 2011 at the Shanghai International Film Festival as part of the Focus Canada showcase. It opened the Sydney Canadian Film Festival in Australia on 8 August 2011.

A home-video DVD was released in Canada on 18 January 2011. The DVD extras have deleted scenes including unused songs and a cameo by Margaret Atwood.

== Reception ==
=== Critical response ===
Critics were sharply divided in their reviews of the film. Peter Howell of the Toronto Star wrote that such judgments were determined by "tolerance for pop ditties and groaners" and Rick Groen of The Globe and Mail reduced the debate to whether the film was "risibly lame or delightfully lame". Jim Slotek of the Toronto Sun recommended the "deliberate groaners ... as pure camp" and Michael Potemra of the National Review praised the music and lyrics which remind the audience "how much fun movies can be." However, Greig Dymond of CBC said the film is "marred by weak lyrics, even weaker melodies and a number of actors who probably shouldn't be singing in public" and Will Sloan of Exclaim! wrote that the film "fails resoundingly on every level".

Score: A Hockey Musical was largely seen as a crowd-pleaser full of Canadiana. A review in the Associated Press (AP) called it "a warm, irreverent and irresistibly goofy love letter" to hockey in Canada and Cheryl Binning of Playback magazine called it "an unabashedly Canadian film". Groen called it "the most unashamedly, irrepressibly, gleefully parochial film ever to open [TIFF]" and questioned whether it is pandering to domestic audiences by being "so Canadian it hurts." Arts reporter Alison Broverman felt that the film merely rehashed tired Canadian stereotypes while Sloan thought that it was too commercial, seeking populist appeal by "copying the worst aspects of American popular cinema."

Reviews in the Associated Press, IF Magazine and The Globe and Mail found the film to be lampooning classic musicals. Writing for the latter, Stephen Cole stated: "McGowan's wondrous achievement here is making a discarded genre seem like ready-made fun. He does so by creating a playful satire of musicals, while somehow – this is the hard part – capturing the charm that made song and dance movies so popular." However, Brian Brooks of IndieWire objected to the concept of an ironic musical, writing, "musicals are about the glorious conflation of fantasy with reality – something as antithetical to irony as imaginable".

Several reviewers strongly objected to the film's selection to open TIFF, calling it "embarrassing" and "disastrous". Festival films have tended to be thoughtful in examining their topics and filmmaker Don McKellar noted that festival critics were generally harsher toward comedies. For years, writers continued to refer to the premiere of Score as "infamous" despite its having received a standing ovation. While it had been traditional for a Canadian film to open the festival, (Note: In TIFF's first 35 years, non-Canadian films opened the festival only three times.) Canadian filmmakers avoided the opening spot for eight years following the premiere of Score.

=== Nominations and awards ===
The film received two nominations for the 2011 Directors Guild of Canada (DGC) Awards: Best Feature Film, and Best Direction by McGowan. Reid was nominated for Outstanding Male Performance at the 2011 ACTRA Awards in Toronto.

The 2011 Planet in Focus Environmental Film Festival in Toronto awarded Score the Green Screen Award for integrating environmentally friendly production techniques. The production's green plan reduced its greenhouse gas emissions by an estimated 20 tonnes.

Award	Category	Recipient	Result	Ref.
Directors Guild of Canada Awards	Best Feature Film	Score: A Hockey Musical	Nominated	
Directors Guild of Canada Awards	Best Direction	Michael McGowan	Nominated	
ACTRA Awards in Toronto	Outstanding Male Performance	Noah Reid	Nominated	
Planet in Focus Environmental Film Festival	Green Screen Award	Avi Federgreen	Won	

== See also ==
- Cinema of Canada
- List of films about ice hockey
