= Roman Frayssinet =

French comedian

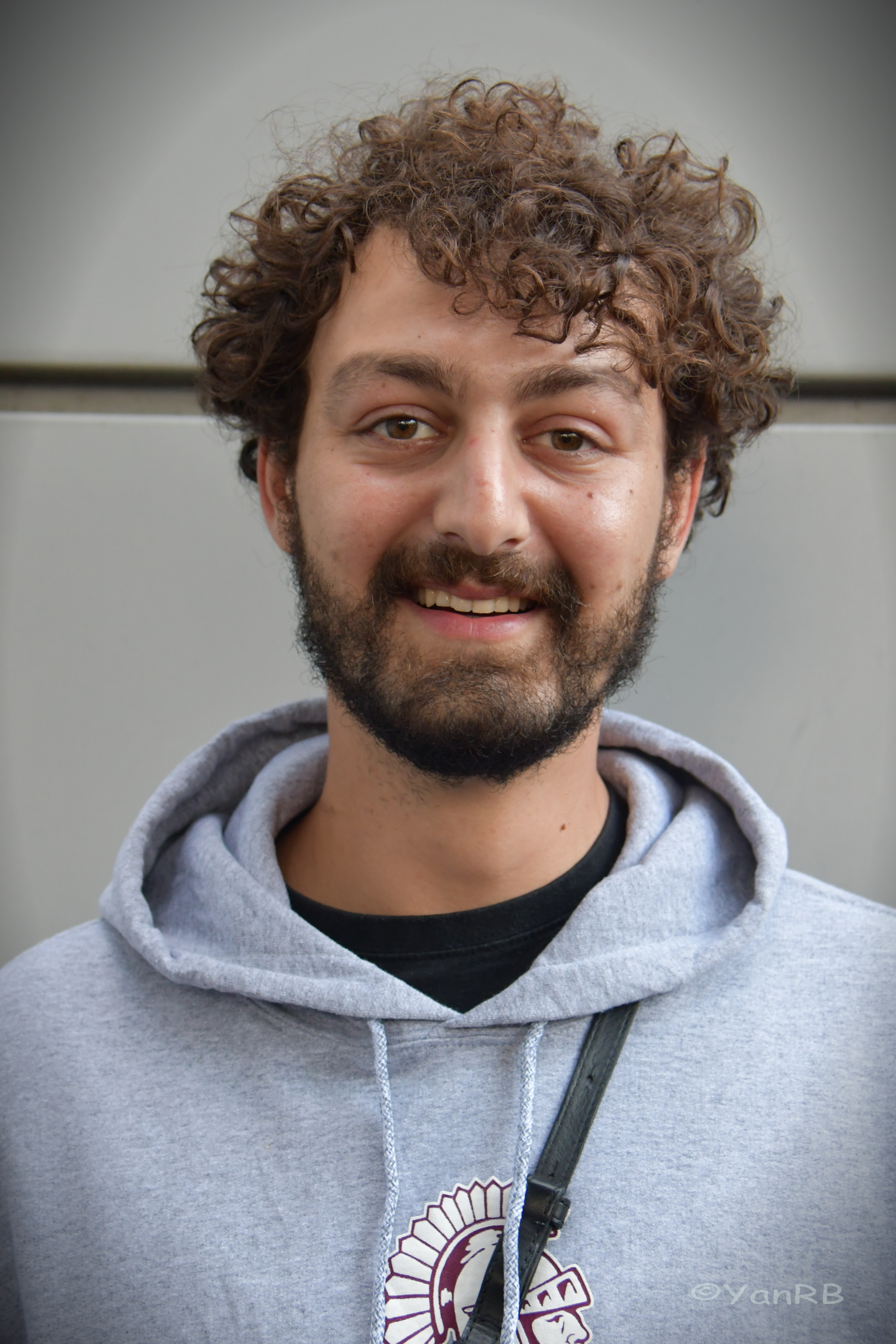
- Born: 6 May 1994 (age 31); Chevilly-Larue
- Education: École nationale de l'humour University of Montreal
- Occupations: Comedian, actor

Roman Frayssinet (born May 6, 1994) in Chevilly-Larue, is a French actor and comedian.

== Biography ==
His father was a CEO and his mother was a civil servant. At the age of 16 he volunteered at the Just For Laughs festival. Frayssinet obtained a baccalauréat (in science) in 2012. After graduating high school, he wanted to become a veterinarian. Ultimately, he moved to Canada, where he studied screenwriting at University of Montreal.

In 2013, he met Uncle Fofi. Frayssinet made his debut at Couscous Comedy Show, then he performed at Zoofest on Chocolat Show. He made his radio debut with a comedy segment on the Malik Mehni show, on CHOQFM. His appearance on Zoofest would come back to bite him. Frayssinet said "You alone have to stand up to those who tell you how hard it's going to be".

He then trained at l'École nationale de l'humour where he participated in the show 11 vies au Club Soda by Serge Postigo. Between January and August 2015, he was a part of the troop La Comédie des Trottoirs. They performed at the Sainte-Catherine Theatre in 2015.

Since January 2018, he has hosted his own segment Les Dernières Minutes on Clique sur Canal+.

At the same time, he performed his last show Alors at the Théâtre de l'Œuvre in Paris. In 2018, Jamel Debbouze invited him to join Marrakech du rire.
