= Carter (TV series) =

Canadian television series

- Genre: Drama; Crime; Comedy
- Created by: Garry Campbell
- Starring: Jerry O'Connell; Sydney Poitier Heartsong; Kristian Bruun; Brenda Kamino; Lyriq Bent; Denis Akiyama
- Composers: Ian LeFeuvre; Ari Posner
- Country of origin: Canada
- Original language: English
- No. of seasons: 2
- No. of episodes: 20

Production
- Executive producers: Garry Campbell; Teza Lawrence; Scott Smith; Michael Souther; John Tinker
- Producers: Garry Campbell; Victoria Hirst
- Cinematography: Craig Wright
- Editors: Eric Goddard; David B. Thompson
- Running time: 42 minutes
- Production companies: Bell Media; Sony Pictures Television Networks Original (season 1); Amaze Film and Entertainment; Sony Pictures Television (season 1); Son of a Dentist Productions (season 2); Gemstone Studios (season 2)

Original release
- Network: CTV Drama Channel
- Release: May 15, 2018 – December 20, 2019

Carter is a Canadian television crime comedy drama series created by Garry Campbell, which premiered on May 15, 2018, on CTV Drama Channel (formerly Bravo). The series stars Jerry O'Connell as Harley Carter, the Canadian star of a hit American television detective series who returns to his hometown to rethink his life after having a public meltdown on the red carpet at an awards show, but finds that his old friends and neighbors can no longer separate him from his television persona and keep asking him to investigate real cases.

The cast includes Sydney Tamiia Poitier as Carter's childhood friend and police officer Sam Shaw, Kristian Bruun as streetwise truck stop owner Dave Leigh, as well as Brenda Kamino. In Season 2, Lyriq Bent joined the cast as the interim police chief, Joyce Boyle, and Andy Berman took over as showrunner. Produced by Amaze Film and Entertainment, the series is shot in North Bay, Ontario, in 2017.

The show was commissioned by Sony Pictures Television (for AXN in Spain, Latin America, Brazil, Japan, Central Europe and Russia) and Bell Media, and is distributed outside of Canada by Sony.

In January 2019, the series was renewed for a second season by WGN America in the United States. The second season premiered in Canada on October 25, 2019, and premiered on WGN America on January 20, 2020.

== Cast ==
=== Main ===
- Jerry O'Connell as Harley Carter
- Sydney Tamiia Poitier as Detective Sam Shaw
- Kristian Bruun as Dave Leigh
- Brenda Kamino as Dot Yasuda
- Lyriq Bent as Joyce Boyle (season 2)

=== Recurring ===
- Denis Akiyama as Koji Yasuda (season 1)
- John Bourgeois as Chief Angus Pershing (season 1)
- Varun Saranga as Junior Agent Vijay Gill
- Matt Baram as Evidence Tech Wes Holm
- Naomi Snieckus as Medical Examiner Delilah Halsey

== Episodes ==
Season	Episodes	Originally released	
Season	Episodes	First released	Last released
1	10	May 15, 2018	July 17, 2018
2	10	October 25, 2019	December 20, 2019

=== Season 1 (2018) ===
No. overall	No. in season	Title	Directed by	Written by	Original release date
1	1	"Koji the Killer"	Scott Smith	Garry Campbell	May 15, 2018
Actor Harley Carter, known for playing Detective Charlie Carter on TV, has a publicized meltdown where he punches a friend who slept with his wife Winter. He returns to his hometown of Bishop, Ontario, connecting with his friends: Sam Shaw, a detective; and Dave Leigh, a truck stop owner. However, soon after Carter arrives, his housekeeper Koji Yasuda is arrested for murder. Carter puts himself into the investigation in the hopes of clearing Koji's name.
2	2	"The Astronaut & The Lion King"	James Dunnison	Ken Cuperus	May 22, 2018
A young man asks Carter to solve the murder of his mother, who was killed in a fire at a paint factory. The police think the young man was responsible, but he is soon found dead himself. Carter considers whether to accept the mayor's offer and become a consulting detective for the local police.
3	3	"The Farmhand Who Bought the Farm"	Scott Smith	Jenn Engels	May 29, 2018
The death of a farmhand on his ranch is investigated as an accident, then a possible homicide that may be connected to meth manufacturing. After an explosion is reported downtown, Carter believes the two cases are related.
4	4	"Harley's Got a Gun"	Scott Smith	Larry Bambrick & Garry Campbell	June 5, 2018
While Dot is teaching Carter how to shoot a gun, they hear a gunshot in the distance and find a man dead. The man is identified as an employee of a local tech company, and his murder is linked to a local pistol dueling business.
5	5	"Pig, Man, Lion"	James Dunnison	Garry Campbell & Wil Zmak	June 12, 2018
Carter and Shaw investigate the murder of a former bank employee found stabbed in his car outside the building. The murder is connected to a local theater company that is putting on a play about a mining accident.
6	6	"The Flood"	Scott Smith	Garry Campbell	June 19, 2018
Amid a severe storm, Carter and Dave attend the wedding of one of Shaw's friends, but during the ceremony two armed men attempt to shoot at the altar. Shaw apprehends one of the gunmen, but the other escapes and takes hostages at the hospital. Winter arrives at the station and confronts Carter over the divorce papers he sent her.
7	7	"Kiki-Loki"	Gail Harvey	Larry Bambrick & Garry Campbell	June 26, 2018
Carter is filming a commercial with Kiki-Loki, a famous half-bird half-elephant drink company mascot from Japan. During one take, the actress playing Kiki-Loki collapses and dies. Dot and Dave, both Kiki-Loki fans, rope Vijay into helping them investigate her death independently of Carter and Shaw.
8	8	"Voiceover"	Rich Newey	Garry Campbell & Wil Zmak	July 3, 2018
A local radio host is seemingly attacked in his home studio live on air, but when police come to his home he is missing, and Carter must determine if the attack was real or a prank. Carter has been having recurring nightmares about Dave being stabbed in the chest.
9	9	"Happy Campers"	Gail Harvey	Garry Campbell & Jenn Engels	July 10, 2018
Carter, Dave, and Shaw visit a camp for adults for a weekend. While there, some other campers discover the skeletal remains of a snowmobiler. The investigation finds that Dave was the last person to text the victim before his death.
10	10	"The Ring"	Rich Newey	Garry Campbell	July 17, 2018
Tanner Ellison, who was convicted of killing Carter's mother and several other women, is killed in his prison cell by another prisoner, who also writes "CALL CARTER" in Ellison's blood. The prisoner says he was hired but does not know by whom. Call Carter showrunner Cassidy Lenox arrives in Bishop to demand Carter return to Hollywood for the next season of the show, which depicts a fictionalized Ellison. In addition, a book about Ellison is on the verge of being published. Carter learns someone posed as him to get Cassidy to bring Carter's mother's ring to him, despite his mother's body never having been found. The investigation finds that Ellison may not have been the one who killed Carter's mother.

=== Season 2 (2019) ===
No. overall	No. in season	Title	Directed by	Written by	Original release date
11	1	"Harley Wears A Wig"	Peter Wellington	Andy Berman	October 25, 2019
Carter takes his first case as a private detective, from a man (Colin Mochrie) who requests help finding his wife. However, Shaw identifies him as a conspiracy theorist who constantly reports false crimes. Chief Pershing retires and is replaced with a new chief from New York, Joyce Boyle. This episode is dedicated to Denis Akiyama, who died on June 28, 2018.
12	2	"Harley Loses a Finger"	Peter Wellington	Garry Campbell	October 25, 2019
Dot goes to Kyoto to scatter Koji's ashes. After flying back to the Bishop Airport, she tells Carter that the man she was sitting next to had a human thumb in the urn he was holding. Boyle soon informs them that the man is a wanted hitman from England, and the team works to recover the thumb and get enough evidence on the man to have him arrested.
13	3	"Harley Gets Replaced"	Jerry Ciccoritti	Carlos Jacott	November 1, 2019
Carter's character in Call Carter has been recast with David Arquette, and he tails Carter to learn the character. Carter investigates the murder of a man found dead at the beach. Sam's sister Simone visits her from out of town.
14	4	"Harley Gets an Office Job"	Kelly Makin	Vivian Lin	November 8, 2019
Carter successfully talks down an actuary (Derek McGrath) from setting himself on fire at a mini railway and promises to show him life is worth living. He starts by getting the man to ask out his former co-worker, only to find that she has been murdered. To solve the case, Carter and Dave go undercover at the insurance company.
15	5	"Harley Gets a Hole in One"	Kelly Makin	Andy Berman	November 15, 2019
Chief Boyle asks Shaw to go undercover as an heiress at a country club to prevent a diamond theft. Carter and Dave join the country club to assist the investigation.
16	6	"Harley Insisted On Wearing Pants"	Jerry Ciccoritti	Garry Campbell	November 22, 2019
A woman asks Carter to investigate the death of her husband, whose death was ruled a heart attack. Upon arriving in the neighborhood, he learns it is a nudist colony. Carter thinks Shaw may have slept with Boyle.
17	7	"Harley Wanted To Say Bonspiel"	Mars Horodyski	Jennifer Kassabian	November 29, 2019
A professional curler is accused of assaulting her rival, and she calls on Carter to help her. The attack occurred days before Bishop was set to host an Olympic qualifying event.
18	8	"Harley Gets To Be Best Man"	Mars Horodyski	Andy Berman & Carlos Jacott	December 6, 2019
Carter and Dave investigate their suspicions of Chief Boyle while he is out of town. However, Boyle's old NYPD partner, who just arrived in Bishop and was scheduled to meet them, is nowhere to be found. Dave steps back on the investigation to go on a date with a woman he met at a bar, but she is actually involved in armed robbery and takes Dave hostage.
19	9	"Harley Doesn't Get His Man"	Sudz Sutherland	Garry Campbell	December 13, 2019
A man is found dead by the lake, wrapped in bubble wrap. Vijay returns to Bishop and asks Carter to find a missing Call Carter fan, who he had been talking to online while accidentally posing as Carter. The two cases soon turn out to be related. Dot asks Dave to drive her to a date.
20	10	"Harley Takes a Bow"	Sudz Sutherland	Andy Berman & Carlos Jacott	December 20, 2019
Ahead of the town's 150th anniversary, Carter hosts an acting class for a Call Carter play, with his old co-star Dwick Brisebois visiting the class. When Carter and Dave visit the police station, they find everyone drugged unconscious by ketamine, resulting in former chief Pershing's daughter Abigail being declared acting chief. The assailant sends the team on a scavenger hunt and threatens violence if Carter does not leave Bishop.

== Broadcast ==
The series is slated to air on AXN in Europe, Asia, Africa and the Americas, and on UKTV in the United Kingdom.

A few weeks after the season premiere on Bravo, Bell Media announced that the series will receive a second window run on terrestrial CTV stations in the summer.

In the United States, WGN America acquired the airing rights in June 2018. The series premiered on the network on August 7, 2018.

== Reception ==
Amy Glynn from Paste called the show "cheeky, sardonic, and emotionally forward, with strong relationships between characters who generally have a humorous angle and tend to be pretty well-developed".

The show received a negative review with Canadian television critic John Doyle of The Globe and Mail calling the show "inelegantly made tomfoolery". He poked fun at other media sources being hung up on the star of the show, Jerry O'Connell, instead of critiquing the quality of the show itself. In short, he said, "When it comes to Canadian TV, the term "exacting standards" doesn't apply".

Los Angeles Times reviewer Lorraine Ali remarked "The show's hour-long episodes are generally pretty entertaining, thanks to the charm and timing of O'Connell" concluding that the show "isn't a gag a minute, or super edgy or the TV comedy that will beat "Veep's" Emmy record. It is, however, an easy-to-watch satire with just the right balance of smart jokes for silly situations".
