= Aurore (2005 film) =

- Aurore movie poster
- Directed by: Luc Dionne
- Written by: Luc Dionne
- Produced by: Denise Robert Daniel Louis
- Starring: Marianne Fortier; Serge Postigo; Remy Girard; Stéphanie Lapointe; Yves Jacques; Hélène Bourgeois Leclerc; Michel Forget; Sarah-Jeanne Labrosse
- Cinematography: Louis de Ernsted
- Edited by: Isabelle Dedieu
- Music by: Michel Cusson
- Distributed by: Alliance Atlantis Vivafilm
- Release date: July 8, 2005
- Running time: 115 minutes
- Country: Canada
- Language: French
- Budget: $7 million CAD

Aurore is a 2005 Quebec biographical drama film that was directed by Luc Dionne and produced by Denise Robert and Daniel Louis. It is based on the true story of Aurore Gagnon, one of Quebec's best-known victims of child abuse. The movie is also a remake of Jean-Yves Bigras's 1952 movie La Petite Aurore, l'enfant martyre (Little Aurore, the Child Martyr).

== Synopsis ==
Aurore Gagnon, born in 1909 to Marie-Anne Caron and Télesphore Gagnon, is the second child of the couple. During the first nine years of her life, Aurore enjoys a happy life; her mother often calls her "little ray of sunshine".

During the fall of 1917, Aurore's mother develops tuberculosis. She is brought to the hospital for several months, and doctors conclude she will never recover. Plans are made to give custody of Aurore and her sister Marie-Jeanne to Télesphore and his cousin's widow, Marie-Anne Houde (often simply referred to as Télesphore's cousin in the movie), with whom he had fallen in love.

During a visit to Marie-Anne Houde before she goes into hospital, Aurore's mother finds one of Marie-Anne's children locked inside a wooden structure. This alerts her that Marie-Anne might not treat her children well; later on in the hospital, she becomes hysterical and tearfully pleads with her father not to let Télesphore's cousin-in-law near her children. The priest of the local church, Father Leduc, upon finding out about the living state of Télesphore, his family and the fact that he has been constantly ignoring Marie-Anne Caron's health, forces Télesphore to visit her in hospital. By that point however, Marie-Anne Caron has become so distraught from the news given prior that she has been driven to madness, to the point where she begins depressingly humming and begins showing signs of false memory, calling Télesphore "Charles" and talking about an unconfirmed sister not visiting her as an example (She could be referring to Marie-Anne Houde but that is not clarified). This increases her deterioration and results in her having to be moved to another room with a restraint around her hand, as her madness became so severe that she tried inflicting self harm by attempting to cut off her ring finger. Télesphore leaves in a haste from the sight of his now mentally-disturbed former wife. This would be the last time they interact with each other.

During these events, Aurore sees her father kissing Marie-Anne. The girl accuses him of never having loved her mother and trying to replace her. Before Télesphore can discipline Aurore, her older sister Marie-Jeanne steps in and tries to reason with her. Aurore says that she intends to tell their mother what's going on, but Marie-Jeanne dissuades her from doing so, saying that their mother's illness has affected her mind, referring to the last visit between her mother and father. Later that night, Aurore writes a letter to her mother saying how much she misses her. She walks out into the pouring rain to deliver the letter, but she collapses just outside the house.

Aurore's mother dies in 1918, and Télesphore and Marie-Anne marry immediately after the funeral. Télesphore sends his children to live with his late wife's parents as he tends to his farm. When Father Leduc catches wind of this, he accuses Télesphore of skipping out on his duties as a parent. He then orders Télesphore to bring his children back to the village as soon as possible.

When two of Marie-Anne Houde's stepchildren die unexpectedly, many of the villagers believe she is responsible for it. One day, at the general store owned by Oréus Mailhot, Fortierville's justice of the peace, two villagers confront Télesphore about the deaths of his two children. Télesphore loses his temper and starts a fistfight with one of the villagers. Oréus breaks the fight up and sends Télesphore home.

The situation soon becomes worse for Aurore, who has since lost her faith in God. During Father Leduc's visit to her school, he berates her for incorrectly reciting the Catechism and for asking him not to shout at her. That afternoon, as they are walking in the village, Marie-Anne confides to Father Leduc what Télesphore had told her a few days prior: Télesphore and his first wife were drunk the night Aurore was conceived. Marie-Anne believes that because of this, Aurore is a child of sin and should be dealt with accordingly, yet Father Leduc warns her not to exaggerate. That night, Marie-Anne slaps Aurore and yells at her for talking back to the priest.

As time goes on, the mistreatment becomes more and more brutal, and it especially seems to worsen whenever Marie-Anne is pregnant.

One day, Marie-Anne is cleaning the house, and she is visibly stressed due to her crying newborn. She reprimands Aurore for not knocking before coming in, and Aurore talks back to her. As Aurore is walking up the stairs, Marie-Anne grabs a 2x4 with nails and hits her in the leg with it. Arcadius Lemay and his wife Exilda happen to be walking by and hear Aurore screaming. Exilda wants to go to the Gagnon house and check on Aurore, but Arcadius shuts her down, telling her to mind her own business. Exilda accuses her husband of being afraid of Télesphore, and she starts to make her way over to the Gagnons', but she relents after Arcadius admonishes her.

A few days later, Aurore wanders away from home and sits in front of an oncoming train, but Télesphore and Marie-Anne manage to save her just in time. That night, Télesphore beats Aurore while shouting and swearing at her. Marie-Anne forces the other children to listen to Aurore's screams.

Oréus examines Aurore's leg; Télesphore and Marie-Anne tell him that their neighbors' sons hit her. When Oréus talks to Aurore in private, he tries to reassure her that he can help her, but out of fear, Aurore sticks to the story that her parents came up with. Oréus still has his doubts and orders Télesphore and Marie-Anne to send Aurore to the hospital. Before Télesphore leaves, he is angrily confronted by Oréus, who swears to get to the bottom of the situation.

At the hospital, Aurore has told the nuns that she tripped, and that that is why her leg is injured. One of the nuns, Sister Anna, comes to change her bandages and asks her again how she hurt her leg. Aurore avoids the question and instead writes a letter to Marie-Anne, asking her and Télesphore to pick her up and take her back home. Sister Anna believes that Aurore is being abused, yet the Superior (informally called "Mother Superior") tells her what she has heard about Aurore from Father Leduc—namely, that Aurore is a compulsive liar. Sister Anna suggests that Aurore is only lying out of fear, but the Mother Superior promptly rebukes her for questioning the priest.

After Aurore returns from the hospital, she goes with her family to confession, where Father Leduc accuses her of having lied to the nuns at the hospital. While waiting for her stepdaughter, Marie-Anne steals two gold clips from the church's altar and slips them in her dress pocket. After telling the priest that she wants to be with her mother again, Aurore runs out of the confessional. Marie-Anne grabs her and asks her where she is going, but Aurore simply walks away.

That night, Marie-Anne has a heated argument with Télesphore. She shows him the gold clips and claims that Aurore stole them from the church. Télesphore then breaks off the handle of his axe, marches up to Aurore's room, and starts beating her with the handle.

Marie-Anne Caron's father, Nérée, shows up to Oréus' shop and demands he do something to protect Aurore. Oréus tells Nérée that the reason no one has done anything is because everyone is scared of Télesphore. Nérée then shows Oréus the contract from Télesphore's first marriage, which states that Télesphore and his wife will get money every time one of their children dies.

Oréus promptly confronts Father Leduc with the marriage contract and threatens to report him to the local bishop if he refuses to cooperate. Meanwhile, Marie-Anne has gathered all of her children in the kitchen, and after reciting an excerpt from the Catechism, she takes a red-hot metal poker out of the fireplace and burns Aurore with it repeatedly as the other children watch in horror. Marie-Anne continues to burn Aurore with the poker until well after nightfall; she only stops after one of her sons pleads with her.

One day, Exilda stops by the Gagnon house and walks upstairs, discovering Aurore unconscious. Marie-Anne then surprises her, and the two go downstairs. Marie-Anne tries to justify her treatment of Aurore, claiming she was a detestable child who was conceived in sin. Exilda soon becomes fed up with her and yells at her to be quiet. When Télesphore gets home, Exilda tells him to go upstairs and see what has happened.

When Oréus and several others, including doctors, arrive at Aurore's home, it is too late—she has collapsed on the stairs and has suffered another beating at the hands of Marie-Anne. Doctors are unable to save Aurore, and she dies of blood poisoning.

As he is conducting an autopsy on Aurore, Father Leduc sees all of Aurore's wounds and realizes that she was, in fact, being abused. He then breaks down in tears. Shortly after, he pays a visit to a very drunk Oréus, who swears at him. Father Leduc confesses to Oréus that he never wanted to move to Fortierville; his dream has been to make it to the Vatican. Oréus then blames Father Leduc for not intervening sooner, which might have saved Aurore's life.

After Aurore's funeral, Télesphore and Marie-Anne are immediately arrested. Télesphore is sentenced to life in prison for manslaughter. Marie-Anne is initially sentenced to death by hanging for second degree murder. She is, however, given a life sentence, but health issues force her to leave the jail, and she later dies from breast and brain cancer.

The following Sunday, during his sermon, Father Leduc urges the people of Fortierville to put Aurore's tragic death behind them, but Oréus swears that he will never forget it. He and all the other churchgoers then walk out of the church.

Wracked with guilt and remorse, the priest later kills himself with TNT explosives.

The film ends with an epilogue of Aurore's abusive parents and a picture of her real-life grave.

== Cast ==
- Marianne Fortier as Aurore Gagnon
  - Alice Morel-Michaud as six-year-old Aurore
- Serge Postigo as Télesphore Gagnon
- Hélène Bourgeois Leclerc as Marie-Anne Houde
- Stéphanie Lapointe as Marie-Anne Caron
- Rémy Girard as Oréus Mailhot
- Yves Jacques as Fr. Antoine Leduc
- Sarah-Jeanne Labrosse as Marie-Jeanne Gagnon
- Monique Spaziani as Arzélie Caron
- Michel Forget as Nérée Caron
- Francine Ruel as Exilda Lemay
- Michel Barrette as Adjutor Gagnon
- Gaston Lepage as Alphonse Chandonnet
- Luc Senay as Arcadius Lemay
- Catherine Trudeau as Sister Anna
- Muriel Dutil as Mother Superior
- Pierre Collin as Gédéon Gagnon

== Awards ==
Award	Date of ceremony	Category	Recipient(s)	Result	Ref.
Genie Awards	March 13, 2006	Best Supporting Actor	Rémy Girard	Nominated	
Genie Awards	March 13, 2006	Best Supporting Actress	Marianne Fortier	Nominated	
Genie Awards	March 13, 2006	Best Adapted Screenplay	Luc Dionne	Nominated	
Genie Awards	March 13, 2006	Best Art Direction/Production Design	Michel Proulx	Nominated	
Genie Awards	March 13, 2006	Best Costume Design	Francesca Chamberland	Nominated	
Jutra Awards	March 19, 2006	Best Actress	Hélène Bourgeois Leclerc	Nominated	
Jutra Awards	March 19, 2006	Best Makeup	Adrien Morot, Diane Simard	Nominated	

== See also ==
- Curse of Aurore
