= Fred G. Leebron =

American short story writer and novelist

- Education: Princeton University; Johns Hopkins University; Iowa Writers' Workshop
- Occupations: Short story writer, novelist
- Spouse: Kathryn Rhett

Fred Gifford Leebron is an American short story writer and novelist. He is the author of three novels, and a Professor of English at Gettysburg College.

== Early life ==
Leebron graduated with an A.B. from the Woodrow Wilson School of Public and International Affairs at Princeton University in 1983 after completing an 193-page-long senior thesis titled "Gweilo: A Hong Kong Story." He subsequently earned master's degrees from Johns Hopkins University and the Iowa Writers' Workshop.

== Career ==
Leebron taught at Stanford University. He is now a professor of English at Gettysburg College. He has co-authored a book on writing fiction and co-edited another book on postmodern literature.

Leebron is the author of short stories and three novels. He received the Pushcart Prize in 2000 and O. Henry Award in 2001 and the Pushcart Prize. He was also a Fulbright Scholar.

His first novel, Out West, is about two young adults whose lives have gone downhill. His second novel, Six Figures, is about a non-profit executive who has failed to become financially successful. Six Figures was adapted by director David Christensen as the 2005 film Six Figures.

== Personal life ==
Leebron is married to Kathryn Rhett.

== Works ==
=== Novels ===
- Leebron, Fred G. (1997). Out West. San Diego, California: Harcourt Brace. ISBN 9780156005463. OCLC 37156222.
- Leebron, Fred G. (2001). Six Figures. San Diego, California: Harcourt. ISBN 9780156010641. OCLC 45064678.
- Leebron, Fred G. (2014). In the Middle of All This. Westland, Michigan: Dzanc Books. ISBN 9781480483323. OCLC 872595441.

=== Textbook ===
- Leebron, Fred; Levy, Andrew (1995). Creating Fiction: A Writer's Companion. Fort Worth, Texas: Harcourt Brace College Publishers. ISBN 9780155014145. OCLC 33164590.

=== Anthology ===
- Geyh, Paula; Leebron, Fred G.; Levy, Andrew, eds. (1998). Postmodern American Fiction: A Norton Anthology. W. W. Norton & Company. ISBN 9780393316988. OCLC 958212242.
