= My Dog Vincent =

- Directed by: Michael McGowan
- Written by: Michael McGowan
- Produced by: Nick Seferian
- Starring: Chuck Campbell; Gavin Crawford; Ben Carlson; Kyle Downes; Zehra Leverman
- Release date: 1998
- Running time: 90 minutes
- Language: English

My Dog Vincent is a 1998 comedy film written and directed by award-winning writer and filmmaker Michael McGowan.

== Plot ==
The film is centered on O'Brien (played by Chuck Campbell) and his friends, Wiley and Harper. These three twenty-something young men still live at home, and are looking to expand their horizons in life and love. This coming-of-age story is weaved with their hobbies and interests, both existing and new, one of which is an obsession with Vincent Price. O’Brien is aided in expanding his horizons by his girlfriend Sue.

== Cast ==
- Chuck Campbell as O'Brien Higgins
- Gavin Crawford as Harper
- Ben Carlson as Wiley
- Kyle Downes as Nathan
- Dinah Watts as Mrs Higgins
- Zehra Leverman as Sue
