= Michael McGowan (director) =

Canadian film director

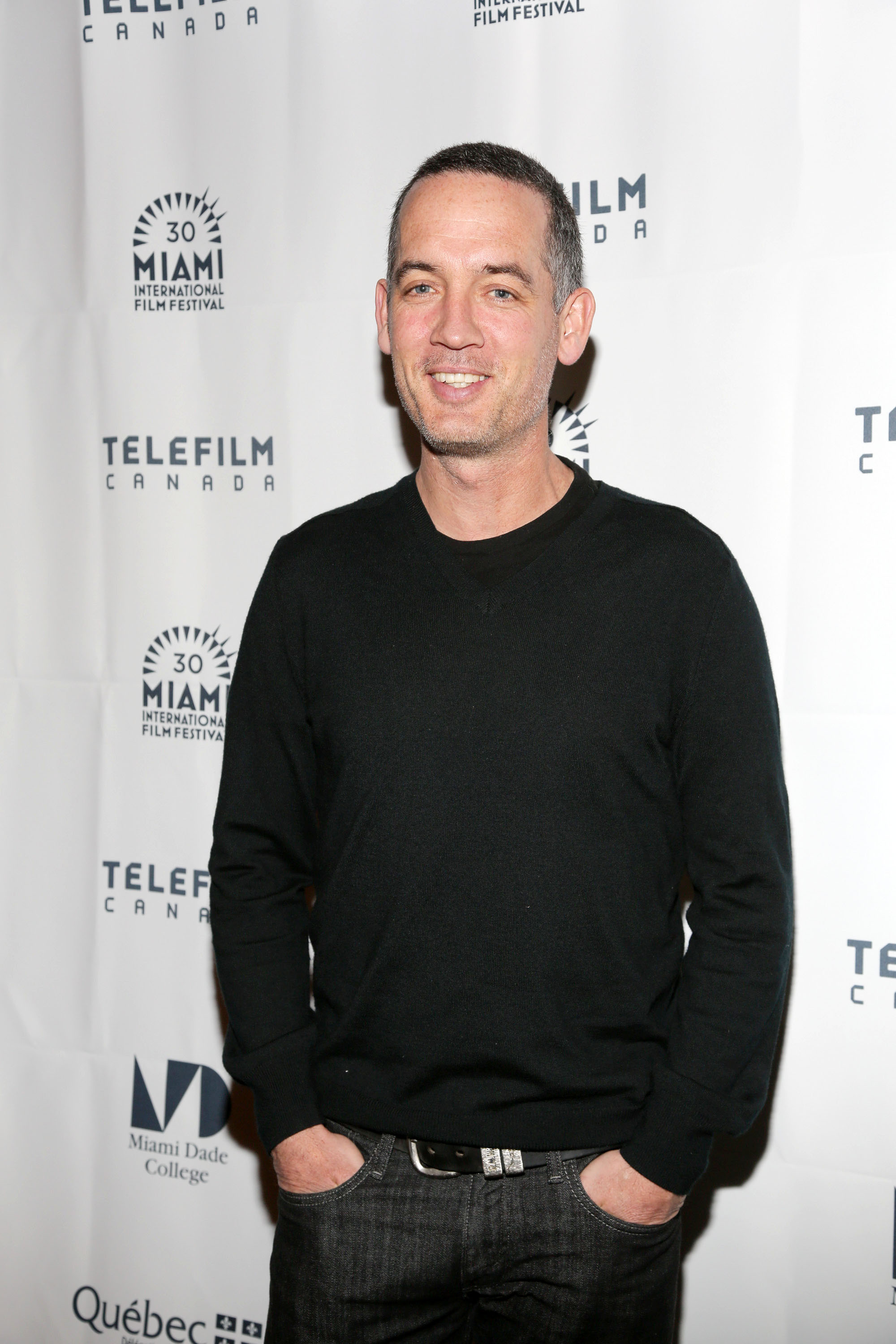
- McGowan at the 2013 Miami International Film Festival
- Born: Toronto, Ontario, Canada
- Occupations: Film director, film producer, screenwriter, film composer
- Years active: 1998–present
- Notable work: Saint Ralph; One Week; Score: A Hockey Musical; Still Mine
- Awards: Directors Guild of Canada DGC Craft Award; 2005 Saint Ralph London Canadian Film Festival Audience Award; 2005 Saint Ralph; Paris Film Festival Grand Prix; 2005 Saint Ralph Writers Guild of Canada WGC Award; 2005 Saint Ralph

Michael McGowan is a Canadian filmmaker. He is best known for writing and directing the feature films Saint Ralph, One Week, Score: A Hockey Musical, and Still Mine.

== Early life ==
McGowan was born in Toronto, Ontario, but graduated from the University of North Carolina with a BA in English.

== Career ==
Returning to Toronto he became a journalist, writing for publications such as Quill & Quire, Toronto Life and The Globe and Mail.

He then joined the TV industry, helping create the stop-motion children's TV show Henry's World, and then wrote and directed Saint Ralph in 2004, for which he won the Outstanding Achievement in Direction award from the Directors Guild of Canada and the Writers Guild of Canada award for Best Feature Film.

His film Score: A Hockey Musical was chosen to open the 35th Toronto International Film Festival in 2010.

== Filmography ==
- My Dog Vincent (1998)
- Saint Ralph (2004)
- Left Coast (2008, TV)
- One Week (2008)
- Vacation with Derek (2010, TV)
- Score: A Hockey Musical (2010)
- Still Mine (2012)
- All My Puny Sorrows (2021)

== Television ==
- The Unprofessionals (2001) – unknown episodes
- Between (2015, TV)
