= The Big Thing (film) =

- Directed by: Carl Laudan
- Written by: Carl Laudan
- Produced by: Carl Laudan
- Starring: Robin Wilcock; Andrew Simms; Mathieu Courtemanche
- Cinematography: Robert Mattigetz
- Edited by: Carl Laudan
- Music by: The Molestics
- Production company: Cinéman Films
- Release date: 2004
- Running time: 9 minutes
- Country: Canada
- Language: English

The Big Thing is a Canadian short black comedy film, directed by Carl Laudan and released in 2004. The film imagines the end of the world in 1889, at the hands of Lucifer (Robin Wilcock) and Michael (Andrew Simms).

The film was a Genie Award nominee for Best Live Action Short Drama at the 26th Genie Awards in 2006.

The film was broadcast by CBC Television in 2007 as part of the short film series Canadian Reflections.
