= Glenn Buhr =

Canadian composer and pianist (born 1954)

- Born: December 18, 1954 (age 71)
- Origin: Winnipeg, Manitoba, Canada
- Genres: Classical, jazz
- Occupations: Composer, conductor
- Instrument: Piano
- Formerly of: Glenn Buhr Quartet
- Spouse: Margaret Sweatman

Glenn Buhr (born December 18, 1954) is a Canadian composer, pianist and conductor, who has been active in both classical music and jazz music.

== Early life and education ==
Originally from Winnipeg, Manitoba, Canada, Buhr studied music at the University of Manitoba, the University of British Columbia and the University of Michigan. Buhr grew up in a Mennonite family originating in Gretna, Manitoba.

== Career ==
Buhr has served as both a composer and conductor for symphonies and ballets, has composed film scores, and has recorded two jazz albums with his own Glenn Buhr Quartet.

He has been a four-time Juno Award nominee for Best Classical Composition, receiving nods at the Juno Awards of 1991 for "Aviravirmayedhi", at the Juno Awards of 1996 for "Piano Concerto", and dual nods at the Juno Awards of 2000 for "String Quartet No. 1" and "Winter Poems".

He is married to writer Margaret Sweatman; Buhr and Sweatman won the Genie Award for Best Original Song at the 26th Genie Awards in 2006 for "When Wintertime", a song they cowrote for the film Seven Times Lucky.
