= Ben Carlson =

Canadian actor

- Education: George Brown College
- Occupation: Actor
- Years active: 1995–present
- Spouse: Deborah Hay (m. 2010)
- Parents: Leslie Carlson (father); Patricia Hamilton (mother)

Ben Carlson is a Canadian actor. Primarily associated with stage roles at the Stratford Festival, he won a Canadian Screen Award for Best Actor in a Television Film or Miniseries for his performance as Petruchio in the CBC Presents the Stratford Festival adaptation of The Taming of the Shrew.

== Early life ==
Carlson began to pursue a music degree at McGill University in Montreal when he decided to change his career path to studying theatre instead. He changed schools and entered into the theatre program at George Brown College where he graduated.

== Career ==
Carlson was a Dora Mavor Moore Award nominee for Best Actor in a Play in 1995 for Hay Fever, and won a Jeff Award in 2007 for his performance as Hamlet at the Chicago Shakespeare Theatre. His other noted performances have included David Cameron in the Canadian production of The Audience, Walter Shirley in the 2008 miniseries Anne of Green Gables: A New Beginning and Wiley in the film My Dog Vincent.

== Personal life ==
He is the son of actors Leslie Carlson and Patricia Hamilton and is married to stage actress Deborah Hay since 2010.

== Filmography ==
=== Film ===
Year	Title	Role	Notes
1997	My Dog Vincent	Wiley	
2012	Twelfth Night	Feste	
2014	The Anniversary	Sam	
2015	Stratford Festival: Antony and Cleopatra	Octavius Caesar	
2016	The Taming of the Shrew	Petruchio	
2018	On the Basis of Sex	William Judson Holloway Jr.	
2020	The Merry Wives of Windsor	Sir Hugh Evans	

=== Television ===
Year	Title	Role	Notes
2004	The Eleventh Hour	William Fudge	Episode: "The Revenge Specialist"
2005	Slings & Arrows	Ed	2 episodes
2006	Angela's Eyes	Chad Lambert	Episode: "Open Your Eyes"
2008	Anne of Green Gables: A New Beginning	Walter Shirley	Television film
2009	Grey Gardens	Adult Phelan Jr.	Television film
2011	Warehouse 13	Colin Shreve	Episode: "Love Sick"
2012	The Firm	Richard Keller	Episode: "Chapter Eight"
2012	Saving Hope	Peter Taylor	Episode: "Pink Clouds"
2012–2013	Rookie Blue	Ross Perik / Cabbie	3 episodes
2016	Reign	Arturo	Episode: "No Way Out"
2016	The Strain	Dr. Wilson Kerry	Episode: "Bad White"
2019	Murdoch Mysteries	Mr. Carmichael / Shadowy Man	2 episodes
2021	Frankie Drake Mysteries	Desmond Greer	Episode: "A Family Affair"
2021	The Lost Symbol	William Osterman	2 episodes
2022	Ruby and the Well	Foster Brody	3 episodes
2026	The Boys	Ed	Episode: "King of Hell"
