= Marina Orsini =

Canadian actress

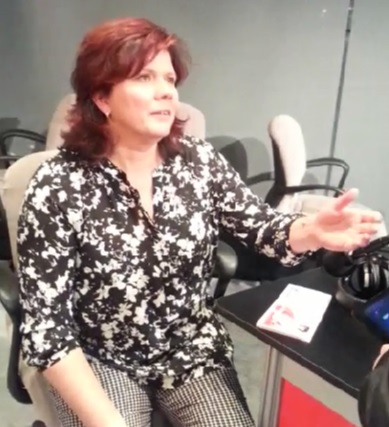
Orsini in 2016

Marina Orsini C.M. (born January 4, 1967) is a Canadian actress.

== Early life ==
Orsini was born in Ville-Émard, Montreal, Quebec, Canada to an Italian-Canadian family.

== Career ==
Orsini first had a brief career in modeling in which she participated in a pageant in 1982. She converted to acting career, and by 1986 she already played her first major role in the popular television series Lance et Compte as Suzie Lambert, the sister of Pierre Lambert (played by Carl Marotte) a superstar hockey player. She reprised her role in more recent editions of that television series from 2001 to 2006 including La nouvelle generation, La reconquete and La revanche in which she became the wife of the club's head coach Marc Gagnon (played by Marc Messier). One of her more prominent performances is as the girlfriend of fictional rock star Eddie Wilson in the 1989 feature film Eddie and the Cruisers II: Eddie Lives!.

She won Gemini Awards in 1990 and 1991 for her roles in Les Filles de Caleb and L'or et le papier. In 1998, she had a leading role as an attorney in the award-winning miniseries The Sleep Room. In 1999, she appeared in the role of a mysterious royal relative of the legendary Vlad the Impaler in the Canadian horror series The Hunger.

Orsini played in the popular Radio-Canada series called Les Filles de Caleb in 1990. She played in its follow-up, Blanche, in 1993. She later met her former husband Serge Postigo during the filming of the television series Urgence in 1996. Since 1991, Orsini has been the spokesperson for the Tel-Jeunes kids talk-help program.

In 1995, Orsini started performing on stage. Her first role was in the play Les Années.

In 2002, Orsini starred in "Agent of Influence", a TV movie, opposite Christopher Plummer.

In 2003, Orsini won a Gemini Award for her performance in the miniseries The Last Chapter, about the attempts of a US motorcycle gang to extend its influence into Canada.

As of 2009, she hosts an afternoon radio show in Quebec on Montreal's CITE-FM.

Orsini was appointed a Member of the Order of Canada in 2012.

== Personal life ==
Orsini gave birth to a son in 2002 with her husband Serge Postigo.
