= Joe Maruzzo =

American actor

Joe Maruzzo is an American actor known for his roles in Unsub, The Sopranos, The Young and the Restless, and others. Also a writer, Maruzzo's work has been featured in editions of The Best American Short Plays.

== Filmography ==
=== Film ===
Joe Maruzzo film credits
Year	Title	Role	Notes
1978	King of the Gypsies	Waiter at Mamma Leone's	
1985	The Protector	Marina Attendant	
1985	Sudden Death	Raphael	
1986	9½ Weeks	Garbageman	
1988	Dominick and Eugene	Guido	
1988	Sticky Fingers	Hood #1	
1995	Dillinger and Capone	Max	
1995	Excessive Force II: Force on Force	Bartholomew 'Barty D' D'Amato	
1999	An Amsterdam Tale	Benny	
2000	Gun Shy	Warren Ganza	
2005	Mobsters and Mormons	Little Nicky	

=== Television ===
Joe Maruzzo television credits
Year	Title	Role	Notes
1985	The Equalizer	Thug #2	Episode: "Bump and Run"
1985	The Equalizer	Head	Episode: "Reign of Terror"
1988	The Equalizer	Lewis Fipps	Episode: "Last Call"
1988	Crime Story	Marty Lester	Episode: "Last Rites"
1989	Unsub	Tony D'Agostino	8 episodes
1989	Kojak: Ariana	Carmine	Television film
1990	Midnight Caller	Mike Scarpelli	Episode: "The Language Barrier"
1990	21 Jump Street	Steven Lamoco	Episode: "Tunnel of Love"
1990, 1993	Murder, She Wrote	Fred Turner / Rudy Bianco	2 episodes
1995	Pointman	Paulie	Episode: "That's Amore"
1995	Under Suspicion	Turko	Episode: "Cop Killing"
1995	The Marshal	Sonny Boy Gabbiano	Episode: "Unprotected Witness"
1996	Baywatch Nights	Pantalone	Episode: "Night Whispers"
1996–2004	NYPD Blue	Various roles	3 episodes
1997	Lois & Clark: The New Adventures of Superman	Mug	Episode: "I've Got You Under My Skin"
1997	Mike Hammer, Private Eye	Rick Dibner	Episode: "Halloween"
2000	Law & Order	Sal Bonafiglio	Episode: "Return"
2001	Law & Order	Glenn Edwards	Episode: "Myth of Fingerprints"
2001	The Big Heist	Paolo Falcone	Television film
2002	Law & Order: Special Victims Unit	Joe Tucci	Episode: "Disappearing Acts"
2002–2004	The Sopranos	Joe Peeps	7 episodes
2003	Crossing Jordan	Eric Brazil	Episode: "Wild Card"
2003	JAG	Commander Del Toro	Episode: "Heart and Soul"
2003	Hunter	Matt Dawes	Episode: "Untouchables"
2004	Las Vegas	Mr. Pyken	Episode: "Things That Go Jump in the Night"
2004	CSI: Crime Scene Investigation	Store Manager	Episode: "Paper or Plastic?"
2004	Star Trek: Enterprise	Sal	Episode: "Storm Front"
2004	CSI: Miami	Wayne King	Episode: "Legal"
2005	The Young and the Restless	Vinny Trabuco	21 episodes
2006	Law & Order	Lieutenant Sullivan	Episode: "Kingmaker"
2007	Law & Order: Criminal Intent	Hector D'Angelo	Episode: "Players"
2007	As the World Turns	Private Investigator	2 episodes
2012	Person of Interest	Soldier #1	Episode: "Flesh and Blood"
2014	Blue Bloods	Sal Laduca	Episode: "Manhattan Queens"
2014	Taxi Brooklyn	Jimmy	Episode: "Double Identity"
2021	Bull	Kitt Corso	Episode: "King Bull"

=== Video Games ===
Year	Title	Role	Notes
2001	Max Payne	Rico Muerte, Joe Salem, Transit Police, Mobster	
