= Margaret Sweatman =

Canadian writer (born 1953)

Margaret Sweatman (born 1953) is a Canadian writer from Winnipeg, Manitoba.

Sweatman was educated at the University of Winnipeg, Concordia University and Simon Fraser University.

Her 2001 novel When Alice Lay Down With Peter was a winner of the Rogers Writers' Trust Fiction Prize and the Sunburst Award.

She teaches literature and creative writing, and performs with the Broken Songs Band. With her husband, Glenn Buhr, she won the Genie Award for Best Original Song at the 26th Genie Awards in 2006 for "When Wintertime", a song they wrote for the film Seven Times Lucky.

== Bibliography ==
- Fox (1991), with a newly released edition of the first novel in November 2017.
- Sam and Angie (1996)
- When Alice Lay Down With Peter (2001)
- The Players (2009)
- Mr. Jones (2014)
- The Gunsmith's Daughter (2022)
