= Ruzz and Ben =

- French: Ruzz et Ben
- Directed by: Philippe Jullien
- Written by: Philippe Jullien; Jean-Pierre Lemouland
- Produced by: Marcel Jean; Jean-Pierre Lemouland
- Starring: Diane Lefrançois; Aline Pinsonneault
- Cinematography: Pierre Bouchon
- Edited by: Glenn Félix
- Music by: Robert Marcel Lepage
- Animation by: David Thomasse; Pierre M. Trudeau; Souad Wedell
- Production companies: JPL Films; National Film Board of Canada
- Release date: 2005
- Running time: 24 minutes
- Countries: Canada; France

Ruzz and Ben (French: Ruzz et Ben) is an animated short film, directed by Philippe Jullien and released in 2005. The film centres on two children who are trying to recover their lost kite, when they discover a strange world presided over by a tall wooden puppet whom they mistake for a threatening figure.

The film was a Genie Award nominee for Best Animated Short at the 26th Genie Awards in 2006.
