= Yule Croak =

- French: Petit Pow! Pow! Noël
- Directed by: Robert Morin
- Written by: Robert Morin
- Produced by: Robert Morin
- Starring: Robert Morin; André Morin
- Cinematography: Robert Morin
- Edited by: Martin Crépeau; Sophie Leblond
- Production company: Coop Vidéo de Montréal
- Release date: October 2005 (FNC)
- Running time: 91 minutes
- Country: Canada
- Language: French

Yule Croak (French: Petit Pow! Pow! Noël) is a Canadian drama film, directed by Robert Morin and released in 2005. The film stars Morin as a man who visits his disabled father in a long-term care home during the Christmas season with the intention of confronting his father (André Morin) about the pain caused by his virtual absence from his son's childhood, only for their dialogue to result in the two men reaching a new peace and understanding.

Morin stressed that despite being based on his real-life relationship with his father and starring both of them as versions of themselves, the film was a scripted fiction rather than a documentary, and had been written with his father's full consent. He also stated that despite the gravity of the film's themes, it was personally meaningful to him as the first time one of his films had a positive ending.

André Morin died soon after shooting of the film was complete, while the film was in post-production.

The film premiered at the 2005 Festival du nouveau cinéma, before going into limited commercial release in December 2007.
