= Harry Sutherland =

Canadian philatelist

- Born: 1922
- Died: 14 February 2006 (aged 83–84)
- Occupation: philatelist

Harry Sutherland, QC (1922 – 14 February 2006) was a Canadian philatelist who signed the Roll of Distinguished Philatelists in 1991.
