= Monica Proietti =

Canadian bank robber (1940–1967)

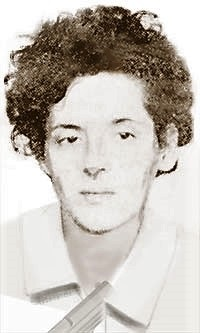
- Born: February 25, 1940; Montreal, Quebec, Canada
- Died: September 19, 1967 (aged 27); Montréal-Nord, Quebec, Canada
- Cause of death: Vehicle accident, gunshot
- Occupation: criminal
- Spouse: Anthony Smith (m. 1956)
- Partner: Viateur Tessier
- Children: 2

Monica Proietti (Italian: [ˈmɔːnika proˈjɛtti; -ˈjet-]; February 25, 1940 – September 19, 1967) was a Canadian bank robber and folk hero from Montreal, better known as "Machine Gun Molly" (in French: Monica la Mitraille).

Proietti came from a poor Montreal family, and many of her relatives were involved in crime; her grandmother served time in jail for receiving stolen goods, and reportedly ran a school for crime for the neighbourhood children in the Red-Light District. In 1956, at the age of 17, Proietti married Anthony Smith, a Scottish gangster (he was 33). The couple had two children. Smith was deported from Canada in 1962. She then became romantically involved with Viateur Tessier, but he was jailed in 1966 for armed robbery.

When she was 19 four of her seven siblings perished in a fire in downtown Montreal. The area had been purchased by the City of Montreal for future demolition for the Jeanne Mance public housing projects.

The members of her crew included Gérald Lelièvre and his brother Robert, who made headlines in 1984 when he and three others were killed when a bomb was detonated in a downtown Montreal apartment building. The victims had been suspected in the murder of West End Gang kingpin Frank "Dunie" Ryan.

Proietti and her accomplices held up more than 20 banks, stealing over an estimated $100,000. On September 19, 1967 she died after crashing into a bus and being shot twice by an undercover police officer following a high-speed chase through the north-end of the city. Reportedly, this was to have been her last bank robbery, intended to fund a new life in Florida.

Mort Künstler painted the artwork Machine Gun Molly for Stag magazine's January 1965 issue.

A 2004 Quebec film Machine Gun Molly (Monica la mitraille) was loosely based on her life. The film was adapted from the book Souvenirs de Monica by Georges-Hébert Germain..

== Bibliography ==
- Georges-Hébert Germain. Souvenirs de Monica, 1997.
- Alan Hustak. "Machine Gun Molly: twenty-five years before Thelma and Louise, Montreal had its own real-life female gangster." Montreal Gazette, September 1, 1991.
- Betty Nygaard King. "Hell Hath No Fury: Famous Women in Crime." Borealis Press, Ottawa, 2001
