= Bangkok Girl =

2005 documentary film

- Directed by: Jordan Clark
- Produced by: Jordan Clark
- Release date: November 2005
- Running time: 43 minutes
- Country: Canada
- Language: English
- Budget: $10,000

Bangkok Girl is a documentary film that was both produced and directed by Jordan Clark. It is a low-budget film, having cost $10,000 to produce, and takes sex tourism in Bangkok as its subject. Bangkok Girl is 43 minutes long and focuses on Pla (full name: Sirirat Rapsithorn), a bargirl who is 19 years old and who guides Clark through the city. The film explores Pla's background and how she came to be where she is. Pla began working as a bargirl at the age of 13, and, while she had managed to avoid being forced into prostitution up until the point that the documentary was filmed, the film suggests that she will eventually be forcibly prostituted. In November 2005, the film aired on "The Lens", a program on Canada's CBC Television. Sweden's Sveriges Television also aired the film.

== See also ==
- Prostitution in Thailand
