= Jon Kaplan (theatre critic) =

Canadian theatre critic (1947–2017)

- Born: 1947
- Died: April 17, 2017 (aged 69)
- Occupation: Theatre critic

Jon Kaplan (1947–2017) was a Canadian theatre critic. He was the senior theatre writer at NOW Magazine.

== Early life and education ==
Kaplan grew up in Florida. He graduated from Brandeis University in 1969 with a degree in English before moving to Canada. He later received a master's degree in English from York University. His thesis was on Elizabethan and Jacobean theatre.

== Career ==
Kaplan began his career as a theatre critic in Toronto in the 1970s writing reviews for The Body Politic. A few years later, he began working for NOW Magazine. Kaplan became NOW's senior theatre writer and worked for the magazine for 35 years.

He wrote his last review for NOW two weeks before his death in 2017.

== Awards and nominations ==
Kaplan has received both the Harold Award and the Brenda Donohue Award.

== Death and legacy ==
Kaplan died at age 69 on April 28, 2017, from brain cancer. He was survived by his husband, Don Cole.

The Jon Kaplan Legacy Fund and the associated annual Jon Kaplan Awards are named in his honour. The Jon Kaplan Audience Choice Award, awarded as part of Toronto's Dora Awards, is also named for Kaplan.
