= Caroline Cave =

Canadian actress

Caroline Cave is a Canadian film, television and stage actress, known for her roles in the films This Beautiful City, One Week, The War Bride, Six Figures and Saw VI, and the television series Cra$h & Burn. She has also had guest roles in The L Word, Haven, Stargate Atlantis, Kevin Hill, The Associates, Dirk Gently's Holistic Detective Agency, and Die neue Prophezeiung der Maya (End of the World) in 2013. She co-starred in the 2015 Lifetime TV movie Accidental Obsession.

Her stage roles have included productions of Pamela Gien's The Syringa Tree, Joanna McClelland Glass' Trying, Stephen Sachs' Miss Julie: Freedom Summer and David Eldridge's Festen.

== Filmography ==
=== Film ===
Year	Title	Role	Notes
2001	The War Bride	Peggy	
2005	Six Figures	Claire	
2007	This Beautiful City	Carol	
2008	One Week	Nancy Tyler	
2009	Saw VI	Debbie	
2010	The Exit	Samantha	Short
2014	What an Idiot	Carol	
2015	The Wolf Who Came to Dinner	Maria Barkley	Short
2017	A Dog's Purpose	Boss's Wife	
2017	Power Rangers	Beverly Scott	
2018	The Ride Home	Anna	Short

=== Television ===
Year	Title	Role	Notes
2001	Almost America (Come l’America)	Jennifer	Television Film
2002	The Associates	Penny	Episode: “Winner Take All”
2004	ReGenesis	Rebecca Kinley	Guest; 2 episodes
2005	Kevin Hill	Andrea Gardner	Episode: “A River in Egypt”
2007	Stargate: Atlantis	Dr. Cole	Episode: “Sunday”
2007	The L Word	Lindsey English	Guest; 3 episodes
2007	The Gathering	Rachel	Guest; 2 episodes
2008	True Crime Scene	Marilyn Sheppard	Episode: “Fugitive Justice”
2009–2010	Crash & Burn	Catherine Scott	Main (Season 1); 13 episodes
2010	Haven	Hannah	Episode: “Butterfly”
2010	Stargate Universe	Dana	Episode: “Intervention”
2011	Sanctuary	Sheila Delacourt	Episode: “Homecoming”
2012	Supernatural	Libby	Episode: “Plucky Pennywhistle's Magical Menagerie”
2012	Christmas Rescue	Fiona	Television Film
2012	The Horses of McBride	Avril Davidson	Television film
2013	End of the World	Selena	Television Film
2014	Signed, Sealed, Delivered	Carrie Atkinson	Episode: “The Edge of Forever”
2015	Splitting Adam	Mrs. Baker	Television Film
2015	Accidental Obsession	Vanessa Miller	Television Film
2016	Date with Love	Ms. Hope	Television Film
2016	Aftermath	Elena	Guest; 2 episodes
2016	Dirk Gently's Holistic Detective Agency	Sammy	Guest; 2 episodes
2017	Story of a Girl	Debbie Lambert	Television Film
2017–2021	Van Helsing	Jolene	Recurring (Seasons 2–3)
2017–2021	Van Helsing	Jolene	Main (Seasons 4-present)
2018	Deadly Deed: A Fixer Upper Mystery	Patrice Moore	Television Film
2018	Darrow & Darrow: Body of Evidence	Bonnie Johnson	Television Film
2018	Charmed	Jenna Gordonson	Episode: “Kappa Spirit”
2019	Unspeakable	Ann O'Malley	Recurring; 8 episodes
2019–2020	Siren	Beth Marzdan	Recurring; 10 episodes

== Awards ==
She won the Gemini Award for Best Actress in a Drama Series for Cra$h & Burn at the 2010 Gemini Awards.

She won a Dora Award in 2004 for her Toronto performance in The Syringa Tree, and a Jessie Award in 2006 for her Vancouver performance in the same play.
