= Luc Dionne =

Canadian screenwriter and director

Luc Dionne is a Canadian screenwriter and director born in Quebec in 1960. Luc's work is largely directed towards the French-speaking market. However, many within the industry accredit Dionne's successful Omerta series as being an inspiration for David Chase's hit series The Sopranos. Another notable television series produced by Dionne is District 31 since 2016.

Dionne's adaptation of Machine Gun Molly (Monica la mitraille) won the 2005 Genie for best screenplay. He was nominated for the same award in 2006 for Aurore.

== Filmography ==
=== As director ===
- 2005 — Aurore
- 2010 — The Child Prodigy (L'enfant prodige)
- 2012 — Omertà

=== As screenwriter ===
- 1996 — Omerta 1, The Code of Silence ("Omertà I - The Code of Silence") (TV series)
- 1997 — Omerta 2, The Code of Silence ("Omertà II - The Code of Silence") (TV mini-series)
- 1999 — Omerta 3, The Last Men of Honor ("Omertà III - The Last Men of Honor) (TV series)
- 2000 — Tag, Season I (TV series)
- 2002 — The Last Chapter I (The Last Chapter) (TV mini-series)
- 2002 — Bunker, le Cirque (TV series))
- 2003 — The Last Chapter II: The War Continues (Le Dernier Chapitre II, la Guerre Continue) (TV mini-series)
- 2004 — Machine Gun Molly (Monica la mitraille)
- 2005 — Aurore
- 2010 — The Child Prodigy
