= Thieves of Innocence =

- French: Les Voleurs d'enfance
- Directed by: Paul Arcand
- Written by: Paul Arcand
- Produced by: Denise Robert
- Cinematography: Alain Lévesque; Éric Cayla
- Edited by: Myriam Poirier
- Production company: Cinémaginaire
- Distributed by: Alliance Atlantis
- Release date: October 7, 2005
- Running time: 90 minutes
- Country: Canada
- Language: French

Thieves of Innocence (French: Les Voleurs d'enfance) is a Canadian documentary film, directed by Paul Arcand and released in 2005. An exploration of Quebec's system of child protection, the film profiles several past and present wards of the system, presenting an argument that the agency is highly bureaucratic and failing many of the children it attempts to serve.

The film was a Genie Award nominee for Best Feature Length Documentary at the 26th Genie Awards.
