= Seven Times Lucky =

- Directed by: Gary Yates
- Written by: Gary Yates
- Starring: Kevin Pollak; Liane Balaban; Jonas Chernick; James Tolkan; Babz Chula
- Cinematography: Steve Cosens
- Production company: Alliance Atlantis
- Distributed by: Motion Picture Distribution LP
- Release date: January 17, 2004 (Sundance)
- Running time: 92 minutes
- Country: Canada
- Language: English

Seven Times Lucky is a Canadian crime drama film released in 2004. Directed by Gary Yates, the film stars Kevin Pollak as Harlan and Liane Balaban as Fiona, a con man and a young student who became involved in a criminal scam.

== Plot ==
When a veteran grifter (Pollak) loses $10,000 of his boss's money at the track, his talented young protégé (Balaban) devises a risky scheme to make quick money. A low-budget film noir set in the underbelly of Winnipeg with plenty of twists and turns, 7 Times Lucky spins a fairly clichéd yarn with some sharp dialogue. The film's cast also includes Jonas Chernick, Babz Chula and Gordon Tootoosis.

== Awards ==
The film garnered seven Genie Award nominations at the 26th Genie Awards, in the categories of Best Supporting Actress (Chula), Best Art Direction/Production Design (Deanna Rohde, Shawna Balas and Ricardo Alms), Overall Sound (Leon Johnson, Bruce Little and Howard Rissin), Sound Editing (Bruce Little and Russ Dyck) and Original Song ("When Wintertime", by Glenn Buhr and Margaret Sweatman). It won the award for Best Original Song.

It won the award for Best Western Canadian Film at the 2004 Vancouver International Film Festival.
