= Francine Ruel =

Canadian actress and writer

Francine Ruel (born April 14, 1948, in Quebec) is a Canadian actress and writer. Her children's novel, Mon père et moi (1993), was nominated for a Governor General's Award, and a Mr. Christie's Book Award. In 1993, she received the Prix Gémeaux Award for Best Performance in a Supporting Role for her role in the television series Scoop.
