= Audition (2005 film) =

- Film poster
- French: L'Audition
- Directed by: Luc Picard
- Written by: Luc Picard
- Starring: Luc Picard; Suzanne Clément; Alexis Martin; Denis Bernard; Robert Lepage
- Release date: September 2005 (Montreal)
- Country: Canada
- Language: French

Audition (French: L'Audition) is a 2005 Canadian comedy-drama film.

Written and directed by Luc Picard, the film stars Picard as Louis, an unhappy middle-aged repo man who decides to pursue his long-abandoned dream of becoming an actor. He quickly lines up an opportunity to audition for a role, and rehearses for his big day with actor Philippe Chevalier (Denis Bernard), while his girlfriend Suzie (Suzanne Clément) is preparing to leave him because she has just found out that she is pregnant but does not want her child to grow up in the atmosphere of violence created by Louis' current job.

The film was partially inspired by a letter Picard wrote to his four-year-old son Henri.

In 2009, it was reported that Picard had secured a deal to direct an English-language adaptation of L'Audition for an American film studio, although the film never materialized.

== Awards ==
The film garnered seven Genie Award nominations at the 26th Genie Awards in 2006:

- Best Actor: Luc Picard
- Best Supporting Actor: Denis Bernard
- Best Supporting Actress: Suzanne Clément
- Best Director: Luc Picard
- Best Original Screenplay: Luc Picard
- Best Sound Editing: Olivier Calvert, Diane Boucher, Simon Meilleur, Francine Poirier and Jean-François Sauvé
- Best Original Song: Daniel Bélanger ("Tourner")

Bernard won the award for Best Supporting Actor.

At the Jutra Awards in 2006, the film garnered ten nominations. Daniel Bélanger won the award for Best Original Score.
