= Rahul's Arranged Marriage =

- Official Movie Poster
- Directed by: Anant Mathur
- Written by: Anant Mathur
- Produced by: Anant Mathur
- Starring: Devika Mathur; Sumeet Mathur; Amar Kumar; Anurag Mathur; Anita Mathur; Jyothi Rana; Abhishek Mathur
- Cinematography: Anant Mathur
- Edited by: Anant Mathur
- Distributed by: Lucky Break Entertainment
- Release date: 2005
- Running time: 10 minutes
- Country: Canada
- Language: Silent film

Rahul's Arranged Marriage, is a 2005 silent Canadian film directed and produced by Anant Mathur, and is a short film.

== Plot ==
The film revolves around a young man named Rahul whose father wants him to marry the daughter (Ishaa) of his old friend Mr. Kapoor. Rahul is quite modern and the concept of arranged marriage doesn't appeal to him. His father convinces Rahul to just meet Ishaa and if he's not interested he'll call it off. But when Rahul meets Ishaa, sparks fly.

== Cast ==
- Sumeet Mathur - Rahul Shrivastava
- Devika Mathur - Ishaa
- Amar Kumar - Rahul's Grandfather
- Anurag Mathur - Mr. Shrivastava
- Anita Mathur - Mrs. Shrivastava
- Jyothi Rana - Mrs. Kapoor
- Abhishek Mathur - Mr. Kapoor
- Vineet Mathur - Ishaa's Brother
- Arvind Mathur - Waiter

== Crew ==
- Anant Mathur - Producer, Director, Writer
- Amar Kumar - Assistant Director
- Archana Johnson - Hair Stylist, Make-Up Artist
- Anant Mathur - Cinematographer
- Amar Kumar - Script Supervisor
- Anant Mathur - Film Editor
- Anant Mathur - Sound Editor
- Sumeet Mathur - Key Grip
- Vineet Mathur - Second Assistant Director
- Dayal Mathur - Property Master
