= One Week (2008 film) =

- Promotional film poster
- Directed by: Michael McGowan
- Written by: Michael McGowan
- Produced by: Michael McGowan; Nicholas de Pencier; Jane Tattersall
- Starring: Joshua Jackson; Liane Balaban
- Narrated by: Campbell Scott
- Cinematography: Arthur E. Cooper
- Edited by: Roderick Deogrades
- Music by: Andrew Lockington
- Production company: Mulmur Feed Co.
- Distributed by: Mongrel Media
- Release dates: September 8, 2008 (TIFF); March 6, 2009 (Canada)
- Running time: 94 minutes
- Country: Canada
- Language: English
- Budget: $2 million (est)
- Box office: $488,697

One Week is a 2008 Canadian drama film written and directed by Michael McGowan and starring Joshua Jackson, Liane Balaban, and Campbell Scott. The film debuted at the Toronto International Film Festival on September 8, 2008, and was released theatrically in Canada by Mongrel Media on March 6, 2009.

Jackson plays Ben Tyler, who has been diagnosed with cancer. Requiring immediate treatment, he instead decides to take a motorcycle trip from Toronto across Canada to Vancouver Island. Along the way, he meets several people that help him reevaluate his relationship with his fiancée Samantha (played by Balaban), his job, and his dream of becoming a writer.

The scenic backdrop of the Canadian landscape as well as an all-Canadian soundtrack serve as prevalent influences in the film.

Joshua Jackson won Best Actor at the 2010 Genie Awards for his portrayal of Ben Tyler. Liane Balaban was nominated for Best Supporting Actress.

== Plot ==
Ben Tyler is a young elementary school English teacher living in Toronto. Ben is told that he has been diagnosed with an aggressive form of cancer in its fourth and final stage.

On the way home, he encounters an elderly man selling his 1973 Norton Commando motorcycle. The narrator notes that Ben's fiancée, Samantha Pierce, despises motorcycles, but he buys it. Finishing a Tim Hortons coffee, he rolls up the cup's rim to see if he has won a prize, but sees only a message that reads "Go West Young Man".

He breaks the news of his cancer to Samantha, as well as his desire to take a two-day excursion on the motorcycle. She objects, arguing that he should begin treatment immediately, but he feels a need for an adventure before "becoming a patient". He asks Samantha to come with him, but she refuses, and he ultimately sets out from Toronto by himself. Early in the trip he begins to question the trip's worth, and turns back. But he encounters two young men bicycling from Newfoundland to Vancouver on a wager of a case of beer. His adventure seems reasonable by comparison, so he resumes it.

He finds that Samantha has packed a copy of a book he had written as a child, hoping that an attached note about reading it to his children someday would persuade him to return and begin treatment. But the story, about a mythical creature called Grumps, which his father had said would bring good fortune to any child who managed to find one, strengthens his resolve to symbolically resume his search for Grumps.

Ben begins to question his future with Samantha: He recalls their discovery while planning their wedding that their religious beliefs – Ben has none – differ, and they have a telephone argument about compromises she's made for him. He meets a middle-aged man staying in the same motel, who successfully treated his cancer years before; he tells Ben that if he's unsure if he's in love, he isn't.

His motorcycle breaks down in rural Saskatchewan. Nearby, he finds a dead dog and phones its owner, a middle-aged rancher. In gratitude, she picks up him and his motorcycle, takes him on a scenic horseback ride, and fixes the minor problem with his bike. She is twice-divorced with a son and granddaughter she rarely sees, but the narrator explains that the time with Ben inspires her to seek the son out, coincidentally meeting the new "love of her life".

Continuing the trip beyond the promised two days, he arrives at Banff National Park in Alberta, and checks into an expensive hotel suite. Samantha has told his family about his cancer, and is flying out to get him. He goes on what he fears will be a last adventure in the woods, where he gets lost and meets Tracy, a backpacker exploring the backcountry with her dog. At her campsite, she chides Ben for giving up too easily on his dreams: of a singing career quashed by a teacher's harsh remarks, and a novel for which he failed to find a publisher. Ben spends the night with her. The next morning, Samantha has arrived earlier than expected, and Ben admits to sleeping with Tracy. He also tells Samantha that he does not love her like she loves him; she leaves him and returns home.

Ben makes his way to the west coast of Vancouver Island. At a diner, he finds himself unable to eat his meal, and meanwhile a truck hits his motorcycle in the parking lot, wrecking it. He rents a surfboard and takes it out into the Pacific, but rather than catching a wave to ride back in, he keeps going, despondent. He sees a humpback whale dramatically breach the surface. Ben remembers that his father had said to him as a child that anyone who searched for Grumps would "know him when you see him"; Ben is satisfied that he has, and returns home. He and Samantha discuss his prospects and their impending breakup, and he goes home to see his family.

The final sequence reveals the movie's narrator recording the final chapter of an audio book, revealed to be One Week by Ben Tyler, a memoir of his motorcycle trip.

== Cast ==
- Joshua Jackson as Ben Tyler
- Peter Spence as Doctor
- Marc Strange as Art Carey
- Richard Waugh as Baseball Coach
- Deirdre Kirby as Mrs. Bell
- Liane Balaban as Samantha Pierce
- Fiona Reid as Mary Tyler
- Chuck Shamata as Gerald Tyler
- Caroline Cave as Nancy Tyler
- David Reale as Pete
- Colin Fox as Father O'Neill
- Campbell Scott as the Narrator

Cameo appearances are made by Canadian musicians Gordon Downie of the Tragically Hip as a cancer survivor, Joel Plaskett of the Joel Plaskett Emergency as a street performer, and Emm Gryner as a fellow hiker who finds Ben in the forest in Banff. Veteran actor Chris Benson appears as the town mayor.

== Soundtrack ==
"A very music-heavy film," as described by director Michael McGowan, the soundtrack and score provides an integral role in One Week. Making a concerted effort to have the soundtrack reflect the Canadian-heavy theme of the film, McGowan assembled an all-Canadian ensemble of artists, notably Sam Roberts, the Great Lake Swimmers, Wintersleep, Patrick Watson, Stars, Luke Doucet, Joel Plaskett, the Sunparlour Players and Lights.

== Release dates ==
One Week screened at the Toronto International Film Festival in September 2008 and in October at the Edmonton International Film Festival. It was the opening night film for the Kingston Canadian Film Festival. Its Canadian theatrical release was on March 6, 2009.

=== Streaming ===
In December 2019, the film was released online on the Canada Media Fund's Encore+ YouTube channel.

== Reception ==
On the review aggregator website Rotten Tomatoes, 50% of eight critics' reviews are positive, with an average rating of 6.9/10.

Dennis Harvey of Variety wrote, "Result is inoffensive. But even the protag's looming mortality never seems more than a familiar narrative gimmick. Similarly, Arthur E. Cooper's widescreen lensing captures much spectacular scenery unspectacularly; the soundtrack is wallpapered with Canadian contemporary singer-songwriter tracks that are nice, but tend to blur together. All other aspects are pro if uninspired."

Greg Quill of the Toronto Star wrote, "[T]he movie's real strength comes from three sources – the understated craft in Jackson's performance as he tenderly steers his character toward enlightenment and acceptance; the distinctive qualities of the Canadian landscape, and the third-person narrative provided by Campbell Scott. His eloquent, conversational commentary provides both a deeper understanding of our pilgrim's progress and the bigger-picture wisdom of a seasoned observer of life's mysteries, large and small."
