= Six Figures (film) =

2005 film by David Christensen

- Directed by: David Christensen
- Written by: David Christensen
- Based on: Six Figures by Fred Leebron
- Produced by: Susan Bristow; David Christensen; Jason Lee
- Starring: JR Bourne; Caroline Cave
- Cinematography: Patrick McLaughlin
- Edited by: Emma Barry
- Music by: Alec Harrison
- Production companies: Agitprop Films; Six Figures Productions
- Distributed by: Seville Pictures
- Release date: September 14, 2005 (TIFF)
- Running time: 108 minutes
- Country: Canada
- Language: English

Six Figures is a Canadian psychological thriller film, directed by David Christensen and released in 2005. An adaptation of the novel of the same name by Fred Leebron, the film stars JR Bourne as Warner Lutz, a man struggling with the stresses and frustrations of trying to maintain his upwardly mobile executive lifestyle who becomes the primary suspect when his wife Claire, played by Caroline Cave, is left comatose by a violent physical attack.

The film was Christensen's narrative feature debut following his prior work as a documentary filmmaker, and incorporated some documentary-style filmmaking techniques.

The film received a nomination for Best Adapted Screenplay at the 26th Genie Awards, and was a finalist for the Rogers Best Canadian Film Award at the Toronto Film Critics Association Awards 2006.
