= My Ancestors Were Rogues and Murderers =

- Directed by: Anne Troake
- Written by: Anne Troake
- Produced by: Kent Martin
- Cinematography: Nigel Markham
- Music by: Ross Murray, Jean Martin, Justin Haynes
- Production company: National Film Board of Canada
- Release date: 2005 (Canada)
- Running time: 100 min.
- Country: Canada
- Language: English

My Ancestors Were Rogues and Murderers is a 2005 National Film Board of Canada documentary film by Newfoundland filmmaker Anne Troake, which explores her own family's ties to the seal hunt and seeks to mount a defense for the now-controversial practice. Troake documents how the seal hunt began to attract international outrage in 1977 following opposition from the International Fund for Animal Welfare (IFAW) and a high-profile visit by French film star and animal rights activist Brigitte Bardot.

Through interviews with family members in Twillingate, including cousin and sealing spokesperson Garry Troake who died at sea just before the start of production, the director advances the argument that sealing is a time-honoured and environmentally responsible industry, while debunking what she sees as misconceptions about the hunt, including how seals are actually killed.

Troake had planned on making the film prior to the death of her cousin Garry in 2000, and decided to continue with it as a way to honour his memory and continue his fight. My Ancestors Were Rogues and Murderers makes ample use of his commentary including accusations of hypocrisy against the IFAW. The film's title is taken from a quote by the filmmaker's grandmother, Jessie Troake Drover, who is also featured.

== Reception ==
My Ancestors Were Rogues and Murderers was named Best Newfoundland Documentary at the 2005 Nickel Film Festival. It was also broadcast on the CBC News Network in April 2006. According to Troake, it was difficult to market the film outside Newfoundland and Labrador, but people's attitudes would change once they had seen the film.

In 2007, the Government of Canada stated that they were using the film in Europe as part of an advocacy plan to defend the image of the Canadian seal hunt, with screenings arranged for European government officials, non-governmental organizations, trade associations and the general public.

== See also ==
- Angry Inuk, a 2016 documentary film about the Inuit seal hunt
