= Denis Bernard (actor) =

Canadian film, television and theater actor and producer

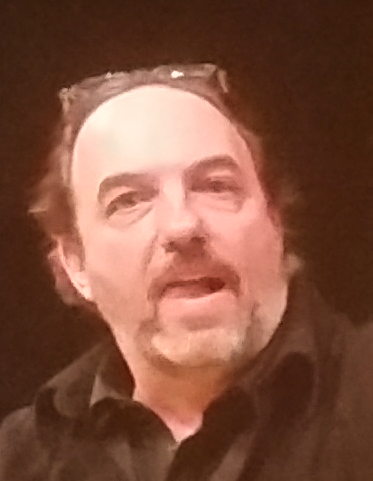
Bernard in 2017

Denis Bernard (born December 6, 1957) is a Genie Award-winning Canadian film, television and theater actor and producer.

== Biography ==
Born in Lac-Etchemin, Quebec, Bernard graduated from the Conservatoire d'art dramatique de Québec in 1980.

He is the cousin of actress Micheline Bernard.

== Filmography ==
=== Actor ===
Year	Title	Role	Notes and Awards
1985	Félix et Ciboulette (TV)	Raymond	
1986	Bach and Broccoli (Bach et Bottine)	Fanny's Father	
1989	La Misère des riches (TV)		
1991	Lance et compte: Le crime de Lulu (TV)	Michel Lauzeau	
1991	La Misère des riches II; aka Jet Set (Canada: English title) (TV)		
1991	Marilyn (TV)		
1992	Shehaweh (TV)	Nicholas	
1995	The Confessional (Le Confessionnal)	Narrator	
1996	Virginie (TV)	Roger Tremblay	
1996	Jasmine (TV)	Louis Desroches	
1997	Le Volcan Tranquille (TV)	François-Xavier Lécluze	
1997	Diva (TV)	Victor Savaria	
1997	Le Masque (TV)	Lucien Aubry	
1997	L'Enfant des Appalaches (TV)	Laurent	
1998	Réseaux (TV)	Charles Morais	
2000	Haute surveillance (TV)	Paul Simon	
2001	Mon meilleur ennemi (TV)	Pierre Roberge	
2001	A Girl at the Window (Une jeune fille à la fenêtre)	Monsieur Dubé	
2003	Les Aventures tumultueuses de Jack Carter (TV)	Sam	
2004	Fortier (TV)	Daniel Richer	
2004	So the Moon Rises (La lune viendra d'elle-même)	Sylvain	
2004	Bittersweet Memories (Ma vie en cinémascope)	Lucio Agostini	
2005	J'te laisserai pas tomber		
2005	Au nom de la loi (TV)	Jean-Luc Therrien	
2005	Audition (L'Audition)	Phillipe Chevalier	Genie Award for Best Actor in a Supporting Role
2005	Trudeau II: Maverick in the Making (TV)	Charlie Trudeau	
2005	L'Auberge du chien noir (TV)	François Durocher	
2006	Le 7e round (TV)	Daniel Ducharme	
2006	Un monde à part (TV)	Richard Pagé	
2006	October 1970 (TV)	Pierre Laporte	
2008	Les Lavigueur, la vraie histoire (TV)	Maître Provencher	
2008	The Necessities of Life (Ce qu'il faut pour vivre)		
2009	Pour toujours, les Canadiens!		
2010	Opening Up (M'ouvrir)	Mr. Deslauriers	
2025	Empathy	Dr. Michel	

=== Producer ===
Year	Title	Notes and Awards
2000	Carpe Diem	
1997	Solos	
1996	Gorille, mon ami	

== Awards ==
- Prix Paul-Hébert (2007)
- Prix Nicky-Roy (2006)
- Genie Award for Best Actor in a Supporting Role for his role of Phillipe Chevalier in Audition (L'Audition)
- 5 nominations at the Gemeaux Awards
- 6 nominations at the Soirée des Masques for Best Actor in a Leading Role and Best Director.
