= Serge Postigo =

Canadian actor (born 1968)

- Born: November 14, 1968 (age 56); Agen, France
- Education: National Theatre School of Canada
- Spouse: Marina Orsini
- Children: 1

Serge Postigo (born November 14, 1968) is a Canadian actor.

== Early life and education ==
Born in Agen, France, he moved to the Canadian province of Quebec during his childhood. He also lived in the Netherlands, Spain and Belgium for a short period. Immediately after his arrival in Canada, Postigo developed a strong interest in the theater industry. He obtained a diploma at the National Theatre School of Canada. Before finishing his studies, he started acting in 1990.

== Career ==
Postigo is one of the many actors in Quebec culture playing in several television shows and soap operas such as Watatatow, Urgence and 4 et demi in the 1990s. He also appeared in the 2005 film, Aurore, in which he played the role of Télesphore Gagnon, the father of Aurore Gagnon, a real life girl in the 1910s and 1920s who was abused and murdered by him and his cousin Marie-Anne Houde.

Postigo won back-to-back MetroStar awards in 1998 and 1999 for best Male Role for the TV show 4 et demi. He also won the MetroStar award of the year in 1999. He was also nominated for a Jutras Award for best supporting actor for Ma vie en cinemascope as well as several Gemini Awards during the 1990s.

== Personal life ==
Postigo and his wife, Marina Orsini, have one son.

== Filmography ==
=== Film ===
Year	Title	Role	Notes
2004	Bittersweet Memories (Ma vie en cinémascope)	Olivier Guimond	
2005	Instant Idol (Idole instantanée)	Christophe	
2005	Aurore	Télésphore Gagnon	
2006	Angel's Rage (La Rage de l'ange)	Père de Éric	
2006	Duo	Francis Roy	
2018	La Bolduc	Roméo Beaudry	
2025	Guess Who's Calling! (Le Répondeur)	Gustave Marandin	

=== Television ===
Year	Title	Role	Notes
1993	Les grands procès	Me Vachon	Episode: "Ginette Couture-Marchand"
1993–1994	Watatatow	Joël Cusson	11 episodes
1995	Scoop IV	Martin Bolduc	5 episodes
1997	Urgence	Dr. Daniel Trudeau	3 episodes
1998	Un gars, une fille	Lui-même	Episode: "Au bureau de Guy/Au resto branché/Au lit 5"
1998	Tartuffe	Valère	Television film
1999	Rue l'Espérance	Olivier Leblanc	—
2002	Music Hall	Michel Simard	—
2011	Penthouse 5-0	Patrick Perreault	12 episodes
2016	Mirador	—	4 episodes
2018	Ruptures	Alain Grimard	6 episodes
