= Andrea Mann =

Canadian actor and director

Andrea Mann is a Canadian actress, film and television producer, film director and screenwriter. She worked at Alliance Atlantis Communications and lives in Toronto, Ontario, Canada.

== Actress ==
- The Beachcombers, TV series (1982)
- Palais Royale (1988)
- The Fly II (1989)
- Cousins (1989)
- Look Who's Talking (1989)
- Omen IV: The Awakening (1991)
- Death Wish V: The Face of Death (1994)

== Producer ==
- Madness of Method (1996) (executive producer)
- Xxxposed (2000) (producer)
- Sweet Sixteen (2002) (associate producer)
- Foolproof (2003) (associate producer)
- Saint Ralph (2004)

== Director ==
- Xxxposed (2000)

== Writer ==
- Xxxposed (2000)
