= Teza Lawrence =

Canadian producer and television writer

Teza Lawrence is a Canadian producer and television writer. She also earned a nomination for the Genie Award for Best Motion Picture for Saint Ralph. She is the Executive Producer and Co-President of Amaze Film and Television. She has worked as an executive producer for the TV shows Call Me Fitz, The Stanley Dynamic, and the 2018 series Carter (TV series).
