= Marianne Fortier =

Canadian actress

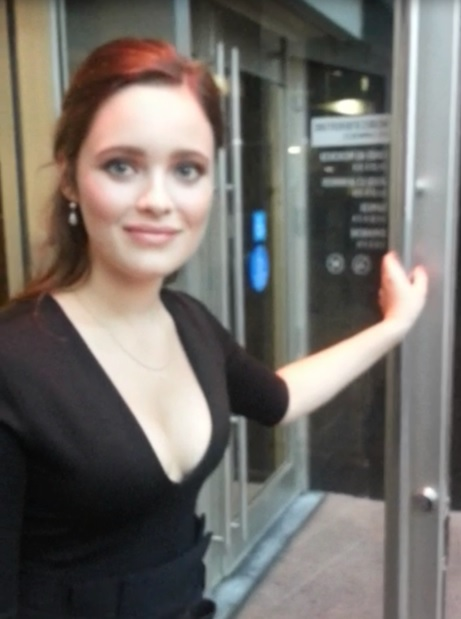
- Marianne Fortier photographed in Montréal, Québec, Canada at the Prix gémeaux 2016 red-carpet ceremony.
- Born: 2 November 1993 (age 31); Quebec City, Quebec, Canada
- Occupation: Actress
- Known for: Leading role in the film Aurore

Marianne Fortier (born 2 November 1993 in Quebec City, Quebec) is a Canadian actress. Her breakthrough came with a leading role in the film Aurore.

== Filmography ==
- 2005: Aurore : Aurore Gagnon
- 2006: À mère et marée (short film) : Cinthia
- 2008: Une grenade avec ça? (one episode) : Daphnée
- 2008: Mommy Is at the Hairdresser's (Maman est chez le coiffeur) (film) : Élise
- 2009: La Galère, Saison 2, 3, 4 et 5 (TV Series) : Raphaëlle
- 2011: Trauma : Mélanie Courtois
- 2013: 1er Amour
- 2019: La Faille (season 1, TV series) : Raphaëlle Fournier
- 2021: Brain Freeze : Patricia
- 2022: Pour Sarah
- 2022: In Broad Daylight (Au grand jour)
- 2024: You Are Not Alone (Vous n'êtes pas seul) : Rita St-Laurent

== Awards ==
- Nominated for Best Actress at the 2006 Genie Award
- Won, Best Actress in a Canadian Film, Vancouver Film Critics Circle Awards 2009
