= Michael Souther =

Canadian television director

Michael Souther is a Canadian television director, producer and television writer. He also earned a nomination for the Genie Award for Best Motion Picture for Saint Ralph. He is the Executive Producer and Co-President of Amaze Film and Television.
