= 8th Jutra Awards =

2006 Canadian film awards ceremony

The 8th Jutra Awards were held on March 19, 2006 to honour films made with the participation of the Quebec film industry in 2005. Nominations were announced on February 8.

Jean-Marc Vallée's C.R.A.Z.Y. dominated the ceremony. With fourteen nominations, a record, it swept each of the thirteen categories it was nominated in; only Pierre-Luc Brillant lost the award for Best Supporting Actor against his co-star Michel Côté. The movie also won the award for Most Successful Film Outside Quebec and the Billet d'or award, bringing its total to fifteen awards, also a record. The film also won three acting awards, the first film to do so and the first film to win both Best Actor and Best Supporting Actor.

Audition (L'audition) received ten nominations, winning Best Original Music for Daniel Bélanger, while The Novena (La neuvaine) received eight nominations, including all the "Big Five" categories, with Élise Guilbault winning her second Best Actress award after The Woman Who Drinks (La femme qui boit).

The Rocket (Maurice Richard) also received a record fourteen nominations, including all the "Big Five" categories, but ended up losing in every category, making it the film with the most nominations to win no awards. However, director Charles Binamé won the award for Best Documentary in a tie with Sylvie Groulx, the second time a tie happened in this category. They respectively won for Gilles Carle: The Untamable Mind and La Classe de Madame Lise.

== Winners and nominees ==
Best Film	Best Director
C.R.A.Z.Y. - Pierre Even, Jean-Marc Vallée; Audition (L'audition) — Luc Martineau, Lorraine Richard; The Rocket (Maurice Richard) — Denise Robert, Daniel Louis; The Novena (La neuvaine) — Bernadette Payeur	Jean-Marc Vallée, C.R.A.Z.Y.; Charles Binamé, The Rocket (Maurice Richard); Bernard Émond, The Novena (La neuvaine); Ricardo Trogi, Dodging the Clock (Horloge biologique)
Best Actor	Best Actress
Marc-André Grondin, C.R.A.Z.Y.; Patrick Drolet, The Novena (La neuvaine); Roy Dupuis, The Rocket (Maurice Richard); Luc Picard, Audition (L'audition)	Élise Guilbault, The Novena (La neuvaine); Hélène Bourgeois Leclerc, Aurore; Suzanne Clément, Audition (L'audition); Julie Le Breton, The Rocket (Maurice Richard)
Best Supporting Actor	Best Supporting Actress
Michel Côté, C.R.A.Z.Y.; Denis Bernard, Audition (L'audition); Pierre-Luc Brillant, C.R.A.Z.Y.; Alexis Martin, Audition (L'audition)	Danielle Proulx, C.R.A.Z.Y.; Anne-Marie Cadieux, Maman Last Call; Diane Lavallée, The Rocket (Maurice Richard); Catherine Trudeau, The Outlander (Le survenant)
Best Screenplay	Best Documentary
Jean-Marc Vallée and François Boulay, C.R.A.Z.Y.; Bernard Émond, The Novena (La neuvaine); Luc Picard, Audition (L'audition); Ken Scott, The Rocket (Maurice Richard)	La Classe de Madame Lise — Sylvie Groulx; Gilles Carle: The Untamable Mind (Gilles Carle ou l'indomptable imaginaire) — Charles Binamé; Perreault Dancer (Danser Perreault) — Tim Southam; Who Shot My Brother? (Qui a tiré sur mon frère ?) — German Gutierrez, Carmen Garcia
Best Live Short	Best Animated Short
The White Chapel (Une chapelle blanche) — Simon Lavoie; Nobody (L'air de rien) — Frédérick Pelletier; Radio — Patrick Boivin; Red (Le rouge au sol) — Maxime Giroux	Dehors novembre — Patrick Bouchard; cNote — Christopher Hinton; The Curse of the Voodoo Child — Steven Woloshen; Tower Bawher — Theodore Ushev
Best Art Direction	Best Cinematography
Patrice Vermette, C.R.A.Z.Y.; Gilles Aird, The United States of Albert (Les États-Unis d'Albert); Michel Proulx, The Rocket (Maurice Richard); Normand Sarazin, The Outlander (Le survenant)	Pierre Mignot, C.R.A.Z.Y.; Steve Asselin, Saint Martyrs of the Damned (Saints-Martyrs-des-Damnés); Pierre Gill, The Rocket (Maurice Richard); Jean-Claude Labrecque, The Novena (La neuvaine)
Best Costume Design	Best Editing
Ginette Magny, C.R.A.Z.Y.; Carmen Alie, Audition (L'audition); Francesca Chamberland, The Rocket (Maurice Richard); Ginette Magny, Les Boys IV	Paul Jutras, C.R.A.Z.Y.; Michel Arcand, The Rocket (Maurice Richard); Louise Côté, The Novena (La neuvaine); Simon Sauvé, Jimmywork
Best Hair	Best Makeup
Réjean Goderre, C.R.A.Z.Y.; Réjean Forget, Instant Idol (Idole instantanée); Martin Lapointe, The Rocket (Maurice Richard); Johanne Paiement, The Outlander (Le survenant)	Micheline Trépanier, C.R.A.Z.Y.; Kathryn Casault, Audition (L'audition); Adrien Morot and Diane Simard, Aurore; Diane Simard, The Rocket (Maurice Richard)
Best Original Music	Best Sound
Daniel Bélanger, Audition (L'audition); Frédéric Bégin and Phil Electric, Dodging the Clock (Horloge biologique); Michel Cusson, The Rocket (Maurice Richard); Robert Marcel Lepage, The Novena (La neuvaine)	Yvon Benoît, Daniel Bisson, Martin Pinsonnault, Jean-François Sauvé, Mira Mailhot, Simon Meilleur, Mireille Morin, Bernard Gariépy Strobl and Luc Boudrias, C.R.A.Z.Y.; Dominique Chartrand, Olivier Calvert and Hans Peter Strobl, Audition (L'audition); Pierre Bertrand, Sylvain Bellemare and Louis Gignac, Familia; Claude Hazanavicius, Claude Beaugrand, Luc Boudrias and Bernard Gariépy Strobl, The Rocket (Maurice Richard)
Special Awards
Jutra Hommage: Denise Filiatrault; Most Successful Film Outside Quebec: C.R.A.Z.Y.; Billet d'or: C.R.A.Z.Y.

== Multiple wins and nominations ==
=== Films with multiple nominations ===
Nominations	Film
14	C.R.A.Z.Y.
14	The Rocket (Maurice Richard)
10	Audition (L'audition)
8	The Novena (La neuvaine)
3	The Outlander (Le survenant)
2	Aurore
2	Dodging the Clock (Horloge biologique)

=== Film with multiple wins ===
Wins	Film
15	C.R.A.Z.Y.
