= Magical Flowers =

- French: Les Fleurs magiques
- Directed by: Jean-Marc Vallée
- Written by: Jean-Marc Vallée
- Produced by: Jean-Marc Vallée
- Starring: Marc-André Grondin; André Champagne; Geneviève Angers; Geneviève Rioux
- Cinematography: Pierre Gill
- Edited by: Jean-Marc Vallée
- Music by: Serge Arcuri; Luc Aubry
- Production company: J.M. Films
- Release date: 1995
- Running time: 21 minutes
- Country: Canada
- Language: French

Magical Flowers (French: Les Fleurs magiques) is a Canadian dramatic short film, directed by Jean-Marc Vallée and released in 1995. The film stars Marc-André Grondin as DJ, a young boy struggling to cope with his father's alcoholism.

The film won the Genie Award for Best Theatrical Short Film at the 16th Genie Awards.

A sequel, Magical Words (Les Mots magiques), was released in 1998. At the time, the two films were planned as part of a trilogy, with the third film to be titled Les Temps magiques ("Magical Times"), but the third film was never completed.
