= Pierre Billon =

Pierre Billon may refer to:

- Pierre Billon (writer) (born 1937), Canadian novelist and screenwriter
- Pierre Billon (director) (1901–1981), French film director and screenwriter
