= Paul Jutras =

Canadian film editor

- Occupation: Film editor
- Awards: Genie Award for Best Editing

Paul Jutras is a Canadian film editor who has also worked in the music video and advertising industries.

In the early 2000s, Jutras edited the music video "Qu'est ce que ca peut ben faire" by Eric Lapointe. In 2002, director Bernard Nadeau won an ADISQ award for the video.

Jutras subsequently edited the 2005 film C.R.A.Z.Y. under director Jean-Marc Vallée. For C.R.A.Z.Y., Jutras won the Genie Award for Best Editing in March 2006, and the Jutra Award for Editing. However, in 2008 when Vallée reassembled much of his crew for his next film The Young Victoria, Jutras was replaced by Jill Bilcock.

When Paul Arcand made his documentary film Québec sur ordonnance, he turned to Jutras for help with editing, and Arcand said they had great conversations in their work. In 2010, after editing an advertisement for Bombardier during the Winter Olympics, Jutras began working for Rooster Post, an advertising company based in Toronto. Later, he edited Juan Diego Solanas's 2012 film Upside Down.
