= Pandora's Beauty =

- French: La Beauté de Pandore
- Directed by: Charles Binamé
- Written by: Charles Binamé; Suzanne Jacob
- Produced by: Lorraine Richard
- Starring: Pascale Bussières; Jean-François Casabonne; Maude Guérin; Annick Bergeron
- Cinematography: Pierre Gill
- Edited by: Michel Arcand
- Music by: Ned Bouhalassa; François Bruneau; Jean-Marc Pisapia
- Production company: Cité-Amérique
- Release date: February 17, 2000 (RVCQ)
- Country: Canada
- Language: French

Pandora's Beauty (French: La Beauté de Pandore) is a Canadian drama film, directed by Charles Binamé and released in 2000. The film stars Jean-François Casabonne as Vincent, a man whose unhappy marriage to Ariane (Maude Guérin) leads him to have an extramarital affair with Pandora (Pascale Bussières), only to witness his life falling apart after Pandora reveals that she is HIV-positive.

The cast also includes Annie Dufresne, Pascale Montpetit, Annick Bergeron, Diane Lavallée and James Hyndman.

The film was shot in 1999 in and around Montreal, Quebec, with a small amount of location filming at Lake Powell in Arizona. It premiered on February 17, 2000 at the Rendez-vous du cinéma québécois.

Bergeron received a Genie Award nomination for Best Supporting Actress at the 21st Genie Awards. The film received two Prix Jutra nominations at the 3rd Jutra Awards, for Best Supporting Actress (Guérin) and Best Original Music (Ned Bouhalassa, François Bruneau and Jean-Marc Pisapia).
