= Pierre Gill =

Canadian cinematographer

Pierre Gill C.S.C. is a Canadian cinematographer and film and television director. A Montreal native, he is closely associated with Quebecois cinema, and has collaborated with directors like Jean-Marc Vallée, Charles Binamé, Christian Duguay, Allan Moyle, and Denis Villeneuve, working on such films as Black List, The Art of War, Lost and Delirious, The Rocket, Polytechnique, and Upside Down. He served as the second unit director of photography on Villeneuve's Blade Runner 2049, which won the Academy Award for Best Cinematography.

He has also directed episodes of the television series Charlie Jade and the made-for-television film The Last Casino.

== Filmography ==
=== Short film ===
Year	Title	Director
1990	Tribute to Cinema	Alain DesRochers
1996	Les fleurs magiques	Jean-Marc Vallée
2008	Sans titre (La jeune fille au matelas)	Adam Kosh
2017	2036: Nexus Dawn	Luke Scott
2017	2048: Nowhere to Run	Luke Scott
2018	Belle Folie	Isabelle Longnus
2019	Florent Vollant: Mes blues passent pu dans porte	Isabelle Longnus

=== Feature film ===
Year	Title	Director
1995	Eldorado	Charles Binamé
1995	Black List	Jean-Marc Vallée
1997	Los Locos	Jean-Marc Vallée
1998	Streetheart	Charles Binamé
1999	Loser Love	Jean-Marc Vallée
1999	Memories Unlocked	Jean Beaudin
2000	The Art of War	Christian Duguay
2001	XChange	Allan Moyle
2001	Lost and Delirious	Léa Pool
2005	The Rocket	Charles Binamé
2006	The Covenant	Renny Harlin
2008	The American Trap	Charles Binamé
2008	Outlander	Howard McCain
2008	Magique!	Philippe Muyl
2008	De l'autre côté du lit	Pascale Pouzadoux
2009	Polytechnique	Denis Villeneuve
2009	Divorces!	Valérie Guignabodet
2011	Starbuck	Ken Scott
2012	Upside Down	Juan Diego Solanas
2013	The Colony	Jeff Renfroe
2014	Elephant Song	Charles Binamé
2015	After the Ball	Sean Garrity
2017	Undercover Grandpa	Érik Canuel
2020	You Will Remember Me	Éric Tessier

=== Television ===
==== Director ====
TV movies

- The Last Casino (2004)
- Fakers (2010)

TV series

Year	Title	Episode
2001	Charlie Jade	"Spin"
2001	Charlie Jade	"Ouroboros"

==== Cinematographer ====
Miniseries

Year	Title	Director
1996	Marguerite Volant	Charles Binamé
1999	Joan of Arc	Christian Duguay
2003	Hitler: The Rise of Evil	Christian Duguay
2012	Bullet in the Face	Érik Canuel
2014	Ascension	Stephen Williams; Vincenzo Natali; Robert Lieberman; Mairzee Almas; Nick Copus

TV series

Year	Title	Director	Notes
1997–98	The Hunger	Érik Canuel; George Mihalka	3 episodes
2000	The Secret Adventures of Jules Verne	Eleanore Lindo	Episodes "Crusader in the Crypt" and "Rocket to the Moon"
2001	Charlie Jade	Himself	Episode "Ouroboros"
2013	The Borgias	Kari Skogland	Episodes "The Face of Death" and "The Purge"
2013	Copper		12 episodes
2016	Shut Eye		10 episodes
2018	Fugueuse	Éric Tessier	10 episodes
2023	Percy Jackson and the Olympians	James Bobin; Jet Wilkinson	4 episodes
2024	Dead Boy Detectives	Lee Toland Krieger	1 episode
2024	Dune: Prophecy	Anna Foerster	3 episodes

TV movies

Year	Title	Director
1997	In the Presence of Mine Enemies	Joan Micklin Silver
2002	Salem Witch Trials	Joseph Sargent
2005	Casanova	Jean-Pierre Jeunet
2010	Fakers	Himself
2011	Cyberbully	Charles Binamé

== Awards and nominations ==
American Society of Cinematographers

Year	Category	Title	Result
2000	Outstanding Achievement in Cinematography in Limited Series	Joan of Arc	Nominated
2003	Outstanding Achievement in Cinematography in Limited Series	Hitler: The Rise of Evil	Won
2014	Outstanding Achievement in Cinematography in Regular Series	The Borgias	Nominated

Genie Awards

Year	Category	Title	Result
1996	Best Cinematography	Black List	Nominated
2000	Best Cinematography	Memories Unlocked	Nominated
2001	Best Cinematography	The Art of War	Nominated
2002	Best Cinematography	Lost and Delirious	Won
2006	Best Cinematography	The Rocket	Won
2009	Best Cinematography	The American Trap	Nominated
2010	Best Cinematography	Polytechnique	Won
2013	Best Cinematography	Upside Down	Nominated

Canadian Society of Cinematographers

Year	Category	Title	Result
2000	Best Cinematography in a TV Drama	Joan of Arc	Won
2000	Best Cinematography in Theatrical	Memories Unlocked	Won
2001	Best Cinematography in Theatrical	The Art of War	Won
2002	Best Cinematography in Theatrical	Lost and Delirious	Won
2004	Best Cinematography in a TV Drama	Hitler: The Rise of Evil	Won
2006	Best Cinematography in Theatrical Feature	The Rocket	Nominated
2009	Best Cinematography in Theatrical Feature	The American Trap	Nominated
2011	Best Cinematography in a TV Drama	Fakers	Nominated
2012	Best Cinematography in a TV Drama	Cyberbully	Won
2014	Best Cinematography in a TV Series	Copper	Won
2016	Best Cinematography in a TV Drama	Ascension	Nominated

Gemini Awards

Year	Category	Title	Result
2005	Best Direction in a Dramatic Program or Mini-Series	The Last Casino	Nominated
2011	Best Direction in a Dramatic Program or Mini-Series	Fakers	Nominated

Prix Gémeaux

Year	Category	Title	Result
1997	Best Cinematography	Marguerite Volant	Won

Prix Iris

Year	Category	Title	Result
2000	Best Cinematography	Memories Unlocked	Won
2001	Best Cinematography	The Art of War	Nominated
2006	Best Cinematography	The Rocket	Nominated
2010	Best Cinematography	Polytechnique	Won
2016	Best Cinematography	Elephant Song	Nominated

Mar del Plata International Film Festival

Year	Category	Title	Result
2001	Best Cinematography	Lost and Delirious	Won

Milan Film Festival

Year	Category	Title	Result
2006	Best Cinematography	The Rocket	Won
