= List of films depicting Colombia =

This is a list of films set in Colombia or which depict certain aspects of it, such as its role in the illegal drug trade or its internal conflict.

Historically, it has been very common that those films (i.e. Collateral Damage, Mr. & Ms. Smith, XXX) fail in the reproduction of the country: some of these mistakes include showing Bogotá or Medellín as sylvatic or coastal regions, using Mexican or Cuban actors (different from Colombians, especially in accent), and a general inaccuracy regarding the depiction of how the conflicts between government and drug-trading cartels work.

More recently, the Oscar-winning Disney film Encanto (2021) has been lauded for representing Colombia in a positive light, while still alluding to the country's history of violence and displacement.

== English ==
- American Made
- Bedazzled
- Behind Enemy Lines: Colombia
- Blow
- Bruce Almighty
- Clear and Present Danger
- Collateral Damage
- Colombiana
- Delta Force 2: The Colombian Connection
- Encanto
- The Godfather Part III
- Green Ice
- Licence to Kill
- Lord of War
- Love in the Time of Cholera
- Loving Pablo
- Memoria
- Miami Vice
- Mr. & Mrs. Smith
- Predator 2
- Proof of Life
- Romancing the Stone
- The Specialist
- Superman III
- Who Shot My Brother?
- XXX

== See also ==
- List of Colombian films
- Colombian diaspora
