= Nicolas Billon =

Canadian writer

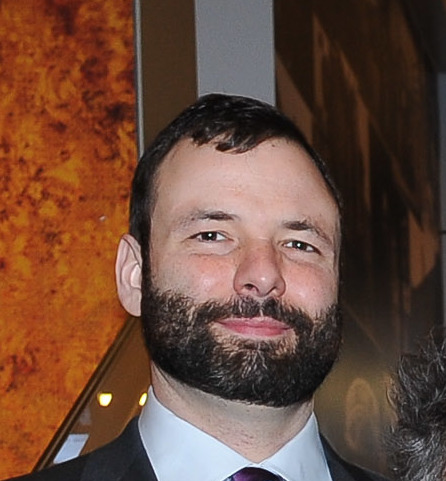
- Occupation: Writer
- Relatives: Pierre Billon
- Writing career
- Period: 2003–present
- Notable works: The Elephant Song, Iceland, Butcher
- Notable awards: Governor General's Award for English-language drama, Canadian Screen Award, WGC Screenwriting Award
- Website: nicolasbillon.com

Nicolas Billon (born March 22, 1978) is a Canadian writer. He is best known for his plays The Elephant Song, Iceland, and Butcher.

== Biography ==
Nicolas Billon was born in Ottawa, Ontario and grew up in Montreal, Quebec. He is the son of Johanne Archambault and writer Pierre Billon.

The Elephant Song, his first play, premiered at the Stratford Shakespeare Festival in 2004. His second play, The Measure of Love, was produced there in 2005.

A member of the inaugural Soulpepper Academy, Nicolas's version of Anton Chekhov's Three Sisters was produced at Soulpepper in 2007, directed by László Marton. He also co-created BLiNK with the other members of the Academy for the Luminato Festival.

In 2009, Billon joined the Tarragon Playwrights Unit. That June, his adaptation of Molière's The Sicilian was one of the hits of the Toronto Fringe Festival.

A few months later, his play Greenland opened at the 2009 SummerWorks Theatre Festival. It was a critical and audience success, and won both the Now Magazine Audience Choice Award and the SummerWorks Outstanding Production Award. Later that year, Billon was voted one of the Top 10 Theatre Artists of 2009 by Toronto's Now Magazine.

Billon was a finalist for and won the 2013 Governor General's Award for Drama for Fault Lines.

His play The Elephant Song was adapted into the 2014 film Elephant Song, directed by Charles Binamé and starring Bruce Greenwood, Xavier Dolan, and Catherine Keener. His screenplay garnered both the 2015 Canadian Screen Award for Best Adapted Screenplay and the 2015 WGC Screenwriting Award for Features & Mini-Series.

Billon's play, Butcher, premiered at Alberta Theatre Projects in October 2014. The play deals with the theme of justice and features several characters who speak Lavinian, an invented language created by two linguists, Christina Kramer and Dragana Obradović, specifically for the play.

== Film ==
=== Feature films ===
- Elephant Song (2014)

=== Short films ===
- Hyperlight (2018)
- How Tommy Lemenchick Became a Grade 7 Legend (2016)
- A Kindness (2012)
- The Exit (2010)

== Theatre ==
=== Plays ===
- The Neighbours (2026)
- Butcher (2014)
- Faroe Islands (2013)
- Iceland (2012)
- The Safe Word (2011)
- Greenland (2009)
- The Measure of Love (2005)
- The Elephant Song (2004)
- The Neighbours (2019)

=== Adaptations ===
- Stevenson's Treasure Island (2017)
- Aeschylus' Agamemnon (2016)
- Brecht & Steffin's Rifles (2014)
- Euripides' Iphigenia at Aulis (2010)
- Molière's The Sicilian (2009)
- Chekhov's Three Sisters (2007)

=== Collaborations ===
- I'm So Close (2010)
- BLiNK (2008)
