= Suzanne Jacob =

Canadian writer

- Born: 1943 (age 82–83); Amos, Quebec, Canada
- Education: Université de Montréal
- Occupations: Novelist; poet; critic
- Writing career
- Language: French
- Notable awards: Governor General's Award for French-language fiction 1983 Laura Laur; Governor General's Award for French-language poetry 1998 La Part de feu

Suzanne Jacob (born 1943) is a French Canadian novelist, poet, playwright, singer-songwriter, and critic.

== Life and career ==
Born in the town of Amos, in the Abitibi region of Québec, she studied classics at the Collège Notre-Dame de l'Assomption in Nicolet, and also attended classes at the "Atelier de théâtre" and the "École de musique".

After moving to Montreal, she attended the University of Montreal where she studied literature and art history. During this time she appeared in two performances of the experimental theatre group, Les Apprentis-Sorciers, a theatrical group that opened up the doors of Montréal to modernist and experimental performance. She taught French between 1966 and 1974. It was at this time that she began to write and perform monologues, poems and songs. In 1970, she won the Prix du Patriote for singer-songwriter of the year. That same year she participated in the Spa festival in Belgium.

Her first novel, Flore Cocon, was published in 1978. It was also in this year that, with Paul Paré and Patricia Gariépy, she founded the publishing house Le Biocreux. Jacob was the literary director of this publishing house for several years. Suzanne Jacob contributed to a number of literary reviews, including Liberté and La Gazette des femmes. She also recorded two albums, Suzanne Jacob (1979) and Une humaine ambulante (1980).

Her abundant and diverse output has resulted in novels, essays, short stories, poems, commentary, performance pieces, plays, and installations. Of her work she has said, that from the beginning she has continually tried to use fiction as a way of creating discrepancies, breaks, and uncertainty in the monolithic set of beliefs that surround us, and that without these discrepancies nothing would shake the rigidity of fundamentalism. In 1992 and 1993, she was writer in residence at the University of Montréal.

She has lectured in Québec, the United States, Europe and South America. She is a member of the Academy of Arts and Letters of Quebec. She received the Governor General's Award and the Prix Paris-Quebec for her novel Laura Laur (1983). She also received the Governor General's Award for La Part de Feu (1997), which was also awarded the First Prize for Poetry by the Société Radio Canada.

Laura Laur was later adapted by Brigitte Sauriol into the 1989 film Laura Laur.

In 2000, Jacob collaborated with Charles Binamé on the film script for La Beauté de Pandore. In 2002 and 2003, she acted in the television dramas Trop jeune pour être père and Footsteps. In 2007, Suzanne Jacob received the Félix-Antoine-Savard poetry prize for the group of poems entitled "Ils ont été nombreux à répondre", which appeared in issue Number 125 of the literary review Estuaire.

== Bibliography ==
=== Novels ===
- Flore Cocon (1978)
- Laura Laur (1983 – Governor General's Award and Prix Paris-Québec)
- La Passion selon Galatée (1987)
- L'Obéissance (1991)
- Rouge, mère et fils (2001)
- Wells (2003)
- Fugueuses (2005)
- Fugueuses translated into English by Thomas Allen Publishers – Fugitives (2008)

=== Short stories ===
- "La Survie (1979; translated by Susanna Finnell as "Life, After All", 1989
- "Maude" (1988; translated by Luise von Flotow as "Maude", 1997)
- "Les Aventures de Pomme Douly" (1988)
- "Plages du Maine" (1989; translated by Susanna Finnell as "A Beach in Maine", 1993)
- "Parlez-moi d'amour" (1998)

=== Poetry ===
- Poèmes I – Gémellaires (1980)
- Les Écrits de l'eau (1996)
- La Part de feu (1997 – Governor General's Award and Premier prix de poésie de la Société Radio-Canada)
- Ils ont été nombreux à répondre, No. 125, la revue Estuaire (2007)

=== Essays ===
- La Bulle d'encre (1997 – Prix de la revue Études françaises)
- Comment pourquoi (2002)

=== Memoirs ===
- Ah—! (1996)

== Discography ==
- Une humaine ambulante (record, 1980)
- Suzanne Jacob (record, 1979)

== Filmography ==
=== As screenwriter ===
- Pandora's Beauty (La Beauté de Pandore) – 2000

== External references ==
- Suzanne Jacob's entry in The Canadian Encyclopedia
- Quebec Council of Arts and Letters (Biography) (in English)
- A Guide to the Literary fonds at Library Archives of Canada (Biography) (in English)
- List of available works (Boréal Publishers) (in French)
- Quebec Academy of Letters (Biography) (in French)
- Critical bibliography (Auteurs.contemporain.info) (in French)
- Suzanne Jacob at IMDb
- International Festival of Poetry: Poet Suzanne Jacob Awarded the 2007 Félix-Antoine-Savard Poetry Prize (in English)
- Suzanne Jacob fonds (R11756) at Library and Archives Canada
