= Jeon Sung-woo =

South Korean actor (born 1987)

Jeon Seong-woo
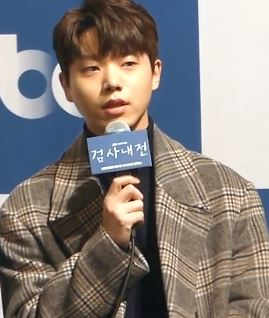
- Jeon in 2019
- Born: December 30, 1987 (age 38); Seoul, South Korea
- Education: Sungkyunkwan University – Performing Arts
- Occupation: Actor
- Years active: 2007–present
- Agent: High Entertainment

Korean name
- Hangul: 전성우
- Hanja: 全晟佑
- RR: Jeon Seongu
- MR: Chŏn Sŏngu

Jeon Sung-woo (Korean: 전성우; born December 30, 1987) is a South Korean actor. In 2007, he made his debut as a musical actor at the age of 20 in Lee Yun-taek's production of the musical Dream on Mars. Since then, he has ventured into television, making his debut in 2015 with a minor role in the drama Six Flying Dragons. Jeon is recognized for his notable supporting roles in various dramas, including The Fiery Priest, Designated Survivor: 60 Days, Diary of a Prosecutor, and The First Responders.

== Early life ==
Jeon was born on December 30, 1987 in Seoul. Since childhood, He always wanted to be a famous celebrity. He convinced his parents to let him attend Anyang Art High School. Later, he joined the Department of Acting and Arts at Sungkyunkwan University, where he crossed paths with director Lee Yun-taek. Lee Yun-taek saw that Jeon had all the qualities of a talented actor, including acting skills, dancing ability, singing talent, a high-pitched voice, and a delicate and gentle appearance. In 2007, Jeon debuted as a musical actor at the age of 20 in Lee Yun-taek's musical Dream on Mars in which he portrayed the young version of Jeongjo of Joseon.

== Career ==
In 2013, Jeon plays the role of Lee Mong-ryong, in musical Indangsu Love Song. It is an original musical that combines the stories of Korea's representative classic novels, The Tale of Chunhyang and The Tale of Simcheong. It premiered in 2002 and celebrates its 11th anniversary in 2013.

For his portrayal of Michael in The Elephant Song and of Christopher in The Curious Incident of the Dog in the Night-Time, Jeon won the Best Actor Award in the Theater Category at the 2016 Stagetalk Audience Choice Awards.

In February 2015, Jeon signed with Kda Company and consequently made his television debut in the sageuk Six Flying Dragons in which he was only credited as a student. The following year, he played a fellow in the department of anesthesiology in the medical melodrama A Beautiful Mind. He also made his film debut in The Table. In 2017, he appeared in the crime drama Oh, the Mysterious.

In July 2018, Jeon signed with High Entertainment and later appeared in KBS Drama Special - "Too Bright for Romance" and tvN Drama Stage - "Water Scale".

In 2019, Jeon appeared in the SBS Friday-Saturday comedy crime drama The Fiery Priest as the young pastor. The drama was a hit and recorded the highest average rating of the year (16.1% nationwide and 18.1% in Seoul). His character received a lot of love.

In the same year, Jeon also appeared in the tvN Monday-Tuesday drama The Lies Within as Agent Seo Ji-won. The drama also achieved decent ratings. From December 16, 2019, to February 11, 2020, Jeon appeared in the JTBC drama Designated Survivor: 60 Days as an NIS terrorism task force cyber specialist in the political thriller. Afterward, he portrayed Kim Jung-woo, a new prosecutor at the Regional Prosecutor's Office who enjoys using social media, in the legal television series Diary of a Prosecutor. In September 2020, Jeon appeared in the KBS weekend drama Homemade Love Story as Hwang Na-ro.

In 2023, Jeon appeared in the SBS Friday-Saturday drama The First Responders as Han Se-jin. He showed chilling acting skills while portraying the main villain, Dex.

== Filmography ==
=== Film ===
Year	Title	Role	Ref.
2016	The Table	Min-ho	
2017	Sky Flute	O-reum	
2017	The Man Only I Can See	Genius	
2023	The Point Men	Secretary Cha	

=== Television series ===
Year	Title	Role	Ref.
2015–2016	Six Flying Dragons	Student	
2016	A Beautiful Mind	Hong Kyung-soo	
2017–2018	Oh, the Mysterious	Scab	
2018	KBS Drama Special – "Too Bright for Romance"	Lee Pil-yong	
2018	Drama Stage – "Water Scale"	Jin-cheol	
2019	The Fiery Priest	Han Sung-gyu / Father Marco	
2019	Designated Survivor: 60 Days	Seo Ji-won	
2019–2020	Diary of a Prosecutor	Kim Jeong-woo	
2020–2021	Homemade Love Story	Hwang Na-ro	
2022–2023	The First Responders 2	Han Se Jin	

=== Web series ===
Year	Title	Role	Ref.
2024	Goodbye Earth	Woo Seong-jae / Damian	

=== Variety shows ===
Year	Title	Role	Ref.
2018	Talkmon	Cast member	
2019	Surfing House	Main host	

=== Music video appearances ===
Year	Title	Artist	Ref.
2018	"The Other Day" (별 시)	Park Hyo-shin	

== Stage ==
=== Musicals ===
List of acting performances in musicals
Year	Title		Role	Theater	Date	Ref.
Year	English	Korean	Role	Theater	Date	Ref.
2007	Dream on Mars	화성에서 꿈꾸다	Jeongjo of Joseon (young)	Seoul Arts Center Opera House	March 15–22	
2010–2011	Hwarang	화랑	Sa Da-ham	Daehakro Open Theater	June 11–February 27	
2011	Spring Awakening	스프링 어웨이크닝	Ernst Röbel	Doosan Art Centre Yeongang Hall	June 3–September 4	
2011–2012	Thrill Me	쓰릴 미	Nathan Leopold	Chungmu Art Hall Middle Theatre Black	November 29–February 26	
2012	Black Mary Poppins	블랙 메리 포핀스	Herman	Art One Theater in the Daehangno	May 8–July 29	
2012–2013	Samcheon – Flower of Ruin	삼천-망국의 꽃	Jin Jang-goon	Daehakro T.O.M. Building 1	October 26–January 20	
2013	Thrill Me	쓰릴 미	Nathan Leopold	The stage	May 17–October 6	
2013	Indangsu Love Song	인당수 사랑가	Mong-ryong	Hongik University Daehakro Art Center Grand Theater	September 7–November 3	
2013	The Goddess Is Watching	여신님이 보고 계셔	Ryu Sun-ho	Daehangno Art One Theater	January 15–March 10	
2013	The Goddess Is Watching	여신님이 보고 계셔	Ryu Sun-ho	Chungmu Art Hall Small Theatre Blue	August 7-11	
2014	The Goddess Is Watching	여신님이 보고 계셔	Ryu Sun-ho	Doosan Art Centre Yeongang Hall	April 26–July 27	
2014	The Goddess Is Watching	여신님이 보고 계셔	Ryu Sun-ho	Goyang Eoullim Nuri Eoullim Theater	November 14–16	
2014	Thrill Me	쓰릴 미	Nathan Leopold	Uniplex 2	August 8–October 26	
2014	On-Stage Season 2	온스테이지 시즌2	Himself	Uniplex Hall 1 (The Great Theatre)	November 18–23	
2015	Bare: The Musical	베어 더 뮤지컬	Jason	Doosan Art Centre Yeongang Hall	June 17–August 23	
2017–2018	Memories of Matsuko	혐오스런 마츠코의 일생	Youichi Ryu	Doosan Art Centre Yeongang Hall	October 27–January 7	
2018	Maybe Happy Ending	어쩌면 해피엔딩	Oliver	Vivaldi Park Hall, Daemyung Cultural Factory Building 1, Seoul	November 13, 2018, to February 10, 2019	
2020	Maybe Happy Ending	어쩌면 해피엔딩	Oliver	Yes 24 Stage 1, Daehangno	June 30 to September 13, 2020	
2024	Aesop's Story	이솝이야기	Timos			

=== Theater ===
List of acting performances in theaterList of acting performances in theater
Year	Title		Role	Theater	Date	Ref.
Year	English	Korean	Role	Theater	Date	Ref.
2012–2013	The Birth of Flirting	밀당의 탄생 시즌2	Seo-dong	PMC Daehak-ro Free Theatre in Daehak-ro	February 24th to April 29th	
2014	M. Butterfly	엠.버터플라이	Song Li-ling	Art One Theatre 1 in Daehak-ro, Seoul	March 8th to June 1st.	
2014	Deathtrap	데스트랩	Clifford Anderson	DCF Daemyung Culture Factory Building 2	July 9—September 21, 2014	
2015	M. Butterfly	엠.버터플라이	Song Li-ling	Doosan Arts Center Yonkang Hall	April 11 to June 7	
2015	The Curious Incident of the Dog in the Night-Time	한밤중에 개에게 일어난 의문의 사건	Christopher	Gwanglim Art Center BBCH Hall	November 27–February 6	
2016	The Elephant Song	엘리펀트 송	Michael Alin	Vivaldi Park Hall, Building 1, DCF Daemyung Culture Factory	April 22nd to May 30th	
2017	The Elephant Song	엘리펀트 송	Michael Alin	Soo-hyun Theatre	September 6–November 26, 2017	
2021	Mouthpiece	마우스피스	Declan Swan	Daehakro Art One Theatre 2	November 12 to January 30	
2021	The Elephant Song	엘리펀트 송	Michael Alin	Yes 24 Stage Hall 3	November 26 to February 13, 2022	
2023	The Amadeus	아마데우스	Wolfgang Amadeus Mozart	Sejong Centre for the Performing Arts M Theatre	February 12 to April 11, 2023	
2023	The Elephant Song	엘리펀트 송	Michael Alin	Yes 24 Stage Hall 3	November 17 to February 13	
2023	The Nature of Forgetting	네이처 오브 포겟팅	Tom	Daehak-ro Art One Theatre 2	December 1 to January 28, 2024	
2024	Bread	빵야	Bbangya	Art Center 1, Daehakro, Jongno-gu, Seoul	June 18–September 8	

== Awards and nominations ==
Name of the award ceremony, year presented, category, nominee of the award, and the result of the nomination
Award ceremony	Year	Category	Nominee / Work	Result	Ref.
SBS Drama Awards	2019	Best Supporting Team	The Fiery Priest	Won	
SBS Drama Awards	2023	Scene Stealer Award	The First Responders 2	Nominated	
Stagetalk Audience Choice Awards	2016	Best Actor (Theater)	The Elephant Song; The Curious Incident of the Dog in the Night-Time	Won	
