= Elephant Song (film) =

2014 film

- Film poster
- Directed by: Charles Binamé
- Written by: Nicolas Billon
- Produced by: Richard Goudreau
- Starring: Bruce Greenwood; Xavier Dolan; Catherine Keener; Carrie-Anne Moss; Colm Feore
- Cinematography: Pierre Gill
- Edited by: Dominique Fortin
- Music by: Patrice Dubuc; Gaëtan Gravel
- Release date: 6 September 2014 (TIFF)
- Running time: 110 minutes
- Country: Canada
- Language: English

Elephant Song is a 2014 Canadian drama film directed by Charles Binamé and adapted from the same titled stage play by Nicolas Billon. The film premiered at the 2014 Toronto International Film Festival.

== Plot ==
Dr. Toby Greene is a psychiatrist at an asylum. Greene is gradually drawn into a psychological mind game by patient Michael, whom he is interviewing about the disappearance of Greene's colleague, Dr. James Lawrence. Michael, a disturbed young man, the son of an opera singer and a distant father he has only seen once, has an aura of charm about him and displays signs of rationality and intelligence that draws the doctor deeper into his stories, despite warnings by head nurse Susan Peterson to keep a distance from the patient. Susan is also his ex-wife. Their marriage did not stand the strain of the drowning death of their daughter Rachel three years ago.

Greene is somewhat distracted by issues in his own life, as tensions with Olivia (his sister or wife — this is unclear) are made worse when she appears at the hospital unannounced with young Amy. Earlier Greene told Amy her Auntie Olivia makes the best pancakes but also tells Michael that Amy is his own niece. Amy appears to have Down’s syndrome. (It is unclear who Amy’s parents are.)

Michael draws Greene into his plot by convincing him not to read his files, but rather form his own opinion based on what Michael has to offer in explanations. Michael continues revealing his troubled experiences with his parents. The elephant connection is from his sole meeting with his father in a nature reserve, when the father kills an elephant in front of his son. The incident traumatized the very young Michael, as did his mother's cold attitude and her distancing herself from him for her singing career. Michael claimed he "killed his mother" by refusing to call an ambulance for her when she ingested an overdose of pills, instead singing to her the "elephant song" until she died on the floor.

Michael discusses the circumstances of his forced stay in the hospital, hinting at an improper doctor-patient relationship involving him and Lawrence, and a bizarre love-hate relationship with Peterson. Michael is aware that Nurse Peterson and Dr. Greene were married and the circumstances of losing their daughter Rachel and makes it known that he knows.

Michael's ploys also include an attempt to negotiate his early release from hospital in return for divulging the circumstances of Dr. Lawrence's disappearance. Michael eventually convinces Greene to exchange a box of chocolates for a note Michael has concealed, which will reveal what has happened to Lawrence. The note states that Lawrence has simply gone to be with his sick sister. While Greene phones Lawrence and confirms the situation, Peterson enters the room and notices the chocolates, nervously screaming that Michael knows he is strongly allergic to the nuts in the chocolates. She and Greene quickly administer an adrenaline shot and attempt resuscitation, but Michael dies. Greene asks for forgiveness from Peterson.

When Dr. Lawrence returns, he confirms that he loved Michael, but not in the manner that Michael had implied. Lawrence has scandals of misappropriation against him. Greene resigns and Peterson is suspended for a period. The film ends with Greene and Peterson meeting and sitting together in a park, holding hands.

== Cast ==
- Bruce Greenwood as Dr. Greene
- Xavier Dolan as Michael Aleen
- Carrie-Anne Moss as Olivia, Greene’s wife
- Guy Nadon as Dr. Jones
- Colm Feore as Dr. Lawrence
- Catherine Keener as Miss Peterson
- Gianna Corbisiero as Florence Da Costa, Michael’s mother
- Cindy Sampson as Christelle
- Larry Day as Sergeant Taylor
- Melody Gaudin-Cormier as Amy
- Mark Donker as Jakobus, Michael’s father

== Release and reception ==
Elephant Song had its premiere at the 39th Toronto International Film Festival on 6 September 2014.

=== Critical response ===
Elephant Song has a score of 60% on review aggregator Rotten Tomatoes, based on 10 reviews, with an average rating of 3.3/5.

=== Accolades ===
- Best Adapted Screenplay, Canadian Screen Award (Nicolas Billon), 2015

Bruce Greenwood was also nominated for the award of Best Performance by an Actor in a Leading Role. In 2014, he was nominated for Best Supporting Actor in a Canadian Film by the Vancouver Film Critics Circle. Charles Binamé was nominated for Best Canadian Feature Film at the Vancouver International Film Festival and for the Grand Prize at the Tallinn Black Nights Film Festival.
