= François Boulay =

Canadian screenwriter

- Education: National Theatre School of Canada
- Occupation: Screenwriter
- Notable work: C.R.A.Z.Y.

François Boulay is a Canadian film and television screenwriter, best known as cowriter with Jean-Marc Vallée of the 2005 film C.R.A.Z.Y. and as a writer for the Quebec television drama series Providence.

Boulay and Vallée won the Genie Award for Best Original Screenplay at the 26th Genie Awards, and the Jutra Award for Best Screenplay at the 8th Jutra Awards.

C.R.A.Z.Y. was based in part on Boulay's own reminiscences about growing up gay.

He is a graduate of the National Theatre School of Canada.
