= Sylvie Groulx =

Canadian film director (1953–2026)

- Born: 25 June 1953; Montreal, Quebec, Canada
- Died: 19 August 2026 (aged 73)

Sylvie Groulx (25 June 1953 – 19 August 2026) was a Canadian documentary film director from Quebec. She is most noted for her 2005 film La Classe de Madame Lise, which won the Jutra Award for Best Documentary Film at the 8th Jutra Awards in 2006.

== Life and career ==
Groulx began her career in 1976, with her films said to reflect societal change. Her first feature film was The Big Sweep (Le Grand Remue-ménage) in 1978.

In 1982, she helped develop the Rendez-vous du cinéma québécois, and in the 1990s, started to work in fiction film. Her first fiction film was 1995's Love Me, Love Me Not (J'aime, j'aime pas).

Her return to documentary came with In the Shadow of Hollywood (À l'ombre d'Hollywood) in 2000, described as "a meditation on the future of cultural diversity and auteur cinema". She subsequently released The Hasty Man Drinks His Tea with a Fork (L'Homme trop pressé prend son thé à la fourchette), a part-fiction, part-documentary film that satirizes a society dedicated to the cult of speed, in 2003, and La Classe de Madame Lise in 2005.

Following La Classe de Madame Lise she made a number of short documentary films, including 2011's La Passion selon Gabriel and Sur les étages in 2013.

Groulx died in August 2026, at the age of 73.
