= Gilles Carle: The Untamable Mind =

2005 Canadian documentary film

- French: Gilles Carle ou l'indomptable imaginaire
- Directed by: Charles Binamé
- Written by: Charles Binamé
- Produced by: Jeannine Gagné
- Starring: Gilles Carle; Chloé Sainte-Marie
- Narrated by: Donald Pilon
- Cinematography: Charles Binamé
- Edited by: Dominique Fortin
- Music by: Gilles Bélanger
- Production company: Amazone Film
- Release date: September 13, 2005
- Running time: 52 minutes
- Country: Canada
- Language: French

Gilles Carle: The Untamable Mind (French: Gilles Carle ou l'indomptable imaginaire) is a Canadian documentary film, directed by Charles Binamé and released in 2005. The film is a profile of influential Quebec film director Gilles Carle, in late life following his diagnosis with Parkinson's disease.

The film was co-winner with La Classe de Madame Lise of the Jutra Award for Best Documentary Film at the 8th Jutra Awards in 2006.
