= Maude Guérin =

Canadian actress

Maude Guérin (born June 11, 1965) is a Canadian film and television actress. She is most noted for her performance in the 2018 film Family First (Chien de garde), for which she won the Prix Iris for Best Actress at the 20th Quebec Cinema Awards. Guérin was born in La Tuque, Quebec.

She was previously a Prix Jutra nominee for Best Supporting Actress in 2000 for Matroni and Me (Matroni et moi) and in 2001 for Pandora's Beauty (La Beauté de Pandore), and Best Actress in 2003 for The Collector (Le Collectionneur).

She has also appeared in the films Heads or Tails (J'en suis!), Tar Angel (L'Ange de goudron), Audition (L'Audition), The Master Key (Grande Ourse: La clé des possibles), The Passion of Augustine (La Passion d'Augustine) and Days of Happiness (Les Jours heureux), and the television series Watatatow, Providence, Vice caché, Belle-Baie, Mémoires vives and Feux.
