= Los Locos =

1997 film

- Directed by: Jean-Marc Vallée
- Written by: Mario Van Peebles
- Produced by: Mario Van Peebles; John E. Vohlers
- Starring: Mario Van Peebles; Melora Walters; René Auberjonois; Danny Trejo
- Cinematography: Pierre Gill
- Edited by: Jean-Marc Vallée
- Music by: Lesley Barber
- Production company: Van Peebles Films
- Distributed by: PolyGram Filmed Entertainment
- Release date: December 20, 1997
- Country: Canada
- Language: English

Los Locos, also known as Los Locos: Posse Rides Again, is a 1997 Western film directed by Jean-Marc Vallée, written by and starring Mario Van Peebles. It also stars Melora Walters, René Auberjonois, and Danny Trejo.

== Plot ==
During the 1800s in the Wild West, a gunman by the name of Chance is hired to escort asylum patients across the desert safely.

== Cast ==
- Mario Van Peebles as Chance
- Melora Walters as Allison
- Rene Auberjonois as Presidente
- Paul Lazar as Buck
- Danny Trejo as Manuel Batista
- Tom Dorfmeister as "Baby Brother"
- Eric Winzenried as Speckman
- Rusty Schwimmer as Sister Drexel
- Jean Speegle Howard as Mother Superior
- Marc Miles as "Spit"
- Mike Traylor as "Rat"
- Jim Cody Williams as Wyatt
- Reno Wilson as Deacon
- Lisa Vitello as Claira
- Joseph Culp as Captain Periah
- Ted Parks as "One-Eye"
- Sam Hernandez as Ortiz Batista

== Production ==
The film was originally conceived as an independently-assembled project by writer/producer Van Peebles. After completion, Polygram, who had previously released Posse to moderate success, acquired the film for home video release, and in most territories sold it as a sequel even though it had no ties to the film and Van Peebles plays a character unrelated to his role in the earlier film.
