= Gorilla and the Bird =

Memoir by Zack McDermott

Gorilla and the Bird: A Memoir of Madness and a Mother's Love is a memoir by the American public defender Zack McDermott published in 2017.

== Background ==
Published in 2017, the book discusses McDermott's experience with bipolar disorder and how his mother helped him survive the diagnosis. When he checked in to the psychiatric unit of Bellevue Hospital for the first time, McDermott began penning the book. The "Gorilla" in the book's title refers to the nickname his mother gave him because of "his barrel chest and hairy body", while the "Bird" refers to his mother as he cited "her tendency to move her head in these choppy semicircles when her feathers were ruffled". The book's initial printing was 40,000 issues.

== Reception ==
The book was "critically acclaimed". In The New York Times, Marya Hornbacher called Gorilla and the Bird "one of the best memoirs I’ve read in years" and said, "the sheer, sharp pleasure of his prose is reason enough to pick it up." She concluded, "With deceptive effortlessness, this book carries the reader through both the peculiar twists and turns of a bipolar mind, and over some complex, shifting terrain in ethics and American life." Writing in The Weekend Australian, Rosemary Neill found the book to be "brutally honest as it is darkly hilarious". Glen Weldon said in NPR that McDermott "chronicles, with an affable and often rueful wit" his experiences with bipolar disorder.

Kirkus Reviews said the book was "decidedly offbeat, unfolding like a country song" and concluded, "If the Joads were tanked up on Bud Light and Haldol and Steinbeck were under Hunter S. Thompson's influence, this might be the result--rueful, funny, and utterly authentic." Emily Reynolds praised the book in The Times Literary Supplement, writing, "Breathless, funny, absurd and often completely inappropriate, it gleefully jumps from place to person to idea, taking on class, race, sex, family and more along the way." She said, "The humour and affection with which McDermott describes both his clients and his fellow psych-ward inmates never veers into mawkishness or pity--a rare quality in literature on this topic."

== Television adaptation ==
On December 10, 2018, it was reported that McDermott's memoir would be adapted into a limited series ordered by HBO. The series was to be directed by Jean-Marc Vallée prior to his death in December 2021. The series would be written by Bryan Sipe and executive produced by Sipe, Vallée, Nathan Ross, Channing Tatum, Reid Carolin, Peter Kiernan, Robin Schwartz, Marc Turtletaub, and Peter Saraf. No news has emerged on the project since then.

The show's premise was to have been: "The limited series follows Zack, a public defender with the Legal Aid Society of New York who suffers a sudden psychotic break that takes him on a harrowing journey of delusions and antisocial behavior, resulting in his arrest and commitment to Bellevue. As he fights to regain his sanity, Zack (the Gorilla) turns to the only person who didn't give up on him—his mother, (the Bird)."
