= Providence (Canadian TV series) =

- Genre: drama
- Written by: Chantal Cadieux; François Boulay; Nicole Giroux; Patrick Lowe
- Directed by: Régent Bourque; Anne Sénécal
- Starring: (see article)
- Theme music composer: Marco Giannetti
- Country of origin: Canada
- Original language: French

Production
- Producer: Jocelyn Deschênes
- Cinematography: Louis Durocher
- Editor: Sylvie Denis
- Running time: 60 minutes

Original release
- Network: Radio-Canada
- Release: January 4, 2005 – November 22, 2011

Providence is a Canadian French language drama television series which aired on Ici Radio-Canada Télé from January 4, 2005 to November 22, 2011.

== Plot ==
Taking place in the fictional town of Providence in the Eastern Townships, the series focuses on the Beauchamp family and their cheese-making enterprise that was part of the Beauchamp family for three generations. The series also focuses on Édith Beauchamp, a businesswoman who is currently head of the company.

== Cast ==
- Monique Mercure : Édith Beauchamp
- Bernard Fortin : Pierre Lavoie
- Hugo Dubé : Bertrand Lavoie
- Sonia Vigneault : Hélèna Beauchamp
- Patrice Godin : Luc Lavoie
- Marie-Joanne Boucher : Marie-Ève Lavoie
- Isabelle Vincent : Diane Bourgeois
- Ève Lemieux : Lili-Mai Lavoie
- Luis Oliva : Diego Dumais
- Marie-Hélène Thibault : Solange Lafleur
- Jeremy T. Gaudet : Napoléon Lavoie-Lafleur
- Maxime Tremblay : Antonin Lavoie
- Anik Vermette : Julie Rioux
- Patrick Hivon : Maxime Bélanger
- Pierre Curzi : Jean-Guy Bélanger
- Nicolas Simard Lafontaine: Jean-Guy Bélanger in his childhood
- Suzanne Garceau : Lucille Champagne
- Sylvain Carrier : Louis Duranleau
- Maude Guérin : Valérie Chénard
- Dino Tavarone : Mauro Santorelli
- Sebastien Roberts : François Berthier
- Frédérice Paquet : Charles-Éric Allan
- Benoît Girard : Robert Beauchamp
- Yan Rompré : Benoît Pilon
- Danièle Panneton : Monique Smith
- Claude Gagnon : Éliot
- France Parent : Manon
- Nathalie Breuer : Anne Daviau
- Josée Guindon : Françe Renaud
- Sabel Dos Santos : Fatima Macedo
- Alex Vallée : Samuel Chénard-Poulin
- Jessica Malka: Katheleen
- Paul Dion: Maurice
- Maxime Morin: Véronique
- Louis-Philippe Dury: un écolier
