= Magical Words =

- French: Les Mots magiques
- Directed by: Jean-Marc Vallée
- Written by: Jean-Marc Vallée
- Produced by: Jean-Marc Vallée
- Starring: Richard Robitaille; Robert Gravel
- Cinematography: Pierre Lambert
- Edited by: Jean-Marc Vallée
- Music by: Serge Arcuri; Luc Aubry
- Production company: J.M. Films
- Release date: 1998
- Running time: 21 minutes
- Country: Canada
- Language: French

Magical Words (French: Les Mots magiques) is a Canadian dramatic short film, directed by Jean-Marc Vallée and released in 1998. A thematic sequel to his 1995 short film Magical Flowers (Les Mots magiques), the film centres on a 30-year-old man (Richard Robitaille) finally confronting his father (Robert Gravel) about his alcoholism.

The film won the Prix Jutra for Best Short Film at the 1st Jutra Awards.
