= Northeast (film) =

2005 film

- German poster
- Directed by: Juan Diego Solanas
- Written by: Juan Diego Solanas; Eduardo Berti
- Produced by: Juan Diego Solanas
- Starring: Carole Bouquet
- Cinematography: Félix Monti; Juan Diego Solanas
- Edited by: Fernando Franco
- Release date: 13 May 2005
- Running time: 104 minutes
- Countries: Argentina; France
- Languages: French; Spanish

Northeast (French: Air; Spanish: Nordeste) is a 2005 Argentina-French drama-thriller film directed by Juan Diego Solanas. It was screened in the Un Certain Regard section at the 2005 Cannes Film Festival.

== Cast ==
- Carole Bouquet as Hélène
- Aymará Rovera as Juana
- Mercedes Sampietro as Sor Beatriz
- Ignacio Jiménez as Martín (as Ignacio Ramon Gimenez)
- Emilio Bardi as Teodoro
- Juan Pablo Domenech as Gustavo
- Jorge Román as Alberto
- Rodrigo Alejandro Hornos as Angel
- Esteban Luis Gonzáles as El Pelado
- Mario Marcelo Reinoso as Tito
- Daniel Valenzuela as Enrique
- Enrique Otranto as Abogado
- Marcela Sánchez as Aurora
- Carlos Bermejo as Pediatra
- César Ramón 'Capullo' Medina as Rudy
