= La Classe de Madame Lise =

2005 Canadian documentary film

- Directed by: Sylvie Groulx
- Written by: Sylvie Groulx
- Produced by: Francine Allaire
- Starring: Lise Coupal
- Cinematography: Michel La Veaux
- Edited by: France Pilon
- Music by: Robert Marcel Lepage
- Production company: Galafilm Productions
- Distributed by: Les Films du 3 mars
- Release date: 2005
- Running time: 89 minutes
- Country: Canada
- Language: French

La Classe de Madame Lise is a Canadian documentary film, directed by Sylvie Groulx and released in 2005. The film centres on Lise Coupal, an elementary school teacher in the diverse and multicultural Parc-Extension district of Montreal, profiling her efforts to foster cultural understanding among her students.

The film was co-winner, with Gilles Carle: The Untamable Mind (Gilles Carle ou l'indomptable imaginaire), of the Jutra Award for Best Documentary Film at the 8th Jutra Awards in 2006.
