= Annick Bergeron =

Canadian actress

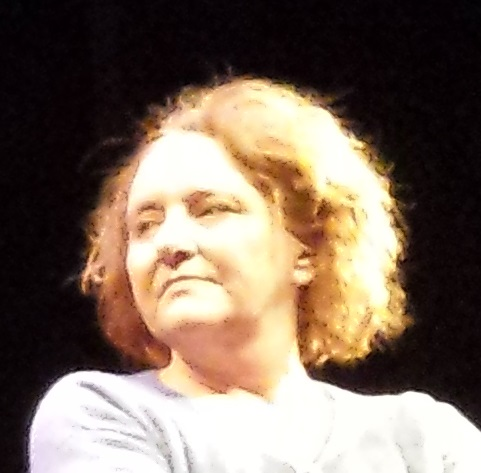
Annick Bergeron

Annick Bergeron is a Canadian actress from Quebec. She is most noted for her performance in the 2000 film Pandora's Beauty (La Beauté de Pandore), for which she was a Genie Award nominee for Best Supporting Actress at the 21st Genie Awards in 2001.

She has also appeared in the film Summit Circle (Contre tout espérance), the television series Le Parc des braves, Avec un grand A, Le Retour, 2 frères, Grand Ourse, Vertige and Mémoires vives, and roles on stage, most notably as Nawal in the original stage production of Incendies.
