= Chantal Cadieux =

Canadian writer living in Quebec

Chantal Cadieux (born June 15, 1967) is a Canadian writer living in Quebec.

She was born in Richmond and received a diploma in play writing from the National Theatre School of Canada in 1990. She was one of a group of young authors who contributed to the show "38", based on works by Shakespeare, at the Théâtre d'Aujourd'hui.

Her novel Longueur d'ondes received the Prix Communication-Jeunesse. Cadieux also was awarded the Prix Yves-Sauvageau two times: for her play Parfums divers in 1990 and for Urgent besoin d'intimité in 1991. She has written scripts for various television series including Annie et ses hommes, Tribu.com, Hommes en quarantaine, Un gars, une fille, Zap and Ent'Cadieux. Her scripts for the television series Providence have been nominated several times for the Prix Gémeaux.

== Selected works ==
=== Theatre ===
- Amies à vie
- On court toujours après l'amour
- Urgent besoin d'intimité

=== Novels ===
- Samedi trouble
- Éclipses et jeans
- Longueur d'ondes

=== Film ===
- Le collectionneur, with Ghyslaine Côté, English version The Collector
- Elles étaient cinq, English version The Five of Us
