= C.R.A.Z.Y. =

2005 film

- Theatrical release poster
- Directed by: Jean-Marc Vallée
- Written by: François Boulay; Jean-Marc Vallée
- Produced by: Pierre Even; Jean-Marc Vallée
- Starring: Marc-André Grondin; Pierre-Luc Brillant; Michel Côté; Danielle Proulx
- Cinematography: Pierre Mignot
- Edited by: Paul Jutras
- Production companies: Cirrus Communications; Playtime Films
- Distributed by: TVA Films
- Release date: May 27, 2005
- Running time: 127 minutes
- Country: Canada
- Language: French
- Budget: $6.5 million
- Box office: $9.9 million

C.R.A.Z.Y. is a 2005 Canadian coming-of-age drama film directed by Jean-Marc Vallée and co-written by Vallée and François Boulay. It tells the story of Zac, a young gay man dealing with homophobia while growing up with four brothers and his father in Quebec during the 1960s and 1970s. The film employs an extensive soundtrack, featuring artists such as David Bowie, Pink Floyd, Patsy Cline, Charles Aznavour, and The Rolling Stones.

A popular piece in the cinema of Quebec, C.R.A.Z.Y. was one of the highest-grossing films of the year in the province. The film won numerous honours, among them 11 Genie Awards, including Best Motion Picture. At Quebec's Prix Jutra film awards, it won 13 awards in the competitive categories from 14 nominations, becoming the all-time record holder for most award wins at that ceremony; it also won both of the box-office based awards, the Billet d'or and the Film s'étant le plus illustré à l'extérieur du Québec, for a total of 15 awards overall.

C.R.A.Z.Y. was submitted for consideration for the Academy Award for Best Foreign Language Film, but was not nominated.

In 2015, Toronto International Film Festival critics ranked it among the Top 10 Canadian Films of All Time.

== Plot ==
Born on Christmas in 1960, Zac is one of four and later five brothers: bookish Christian, rebellious Raymond, sporty, flatulent Antoine and then Yvan. He has a special relationship with his father Gervais, but things began to fall apart as Zac's non-masculine ways start to show. Their relationship officially ends when Gervais comes home to find Zac dressed in his mother's clothes. Ever since then, he "had unwittingly declared war on his father".

At the Christmas party in 1975, Zac shotguns a joint with his cousin Brigitte's boyfriend Paul, which sparks Zac's attraction. His friend Michelle tries to kiss him, but Zac stops her with the excuse of protecting their friendship. Later on, he discovers that Brigitte is no longer with Paul. In a moment of spontaneity, Zac runs a red light on his motorcycle, only to be struck by a car and hospitalized. Zac later learns that Brigitte is back with Paul.

Zac begins a relationship with Michelle, temporarily relieving Gervais—until he sees Zac stepping out of the car with a male classmate, adjusting his crotch. Angry, Gervais has Zac see a therapist to "cure" him of his "homosexuality". The therapist's conclusion is that Zac made "a subconscious deliberate mistake", intentionally doing it so that Gervais would catch him and find out he was "gay".

At the Christmas dinner in 1980, Zac and Michelle's relationship has become closer and more physical. His brother Christian announces his engagement. At Christian's wedding reception, Zac and Paul shotgun a joint outside, but are seen by a guest who thought they were kissing. Gervais overhears this gossip, and chaos ensues. Gervais confronts Zac in the pouring rain, and Zac admittedly comes out, yelling that while he was not kissing Paul, he wished he had been. A sobbing, eavesdropping Michelle runs out of hiding, and Gervais tells Zac to leave. Zac flies to Jerusalem. Disgusted with himself after a gay sexual escapade, he walks into the desert and collapses in exhaustion. A Bedouin, who finds Zac, drips water on Zac's face and takes Zac into his care.

Zac returns home to find his second eldest brother hospitalized after a heroin overdose; he dies the next day. After the funeral, Gervais hugs Zac emotionally. Ten years after his brother's death, Zac narrates that Gervais "had become my father once more", even to the point of allowing his lover into his house.

== Cast ==
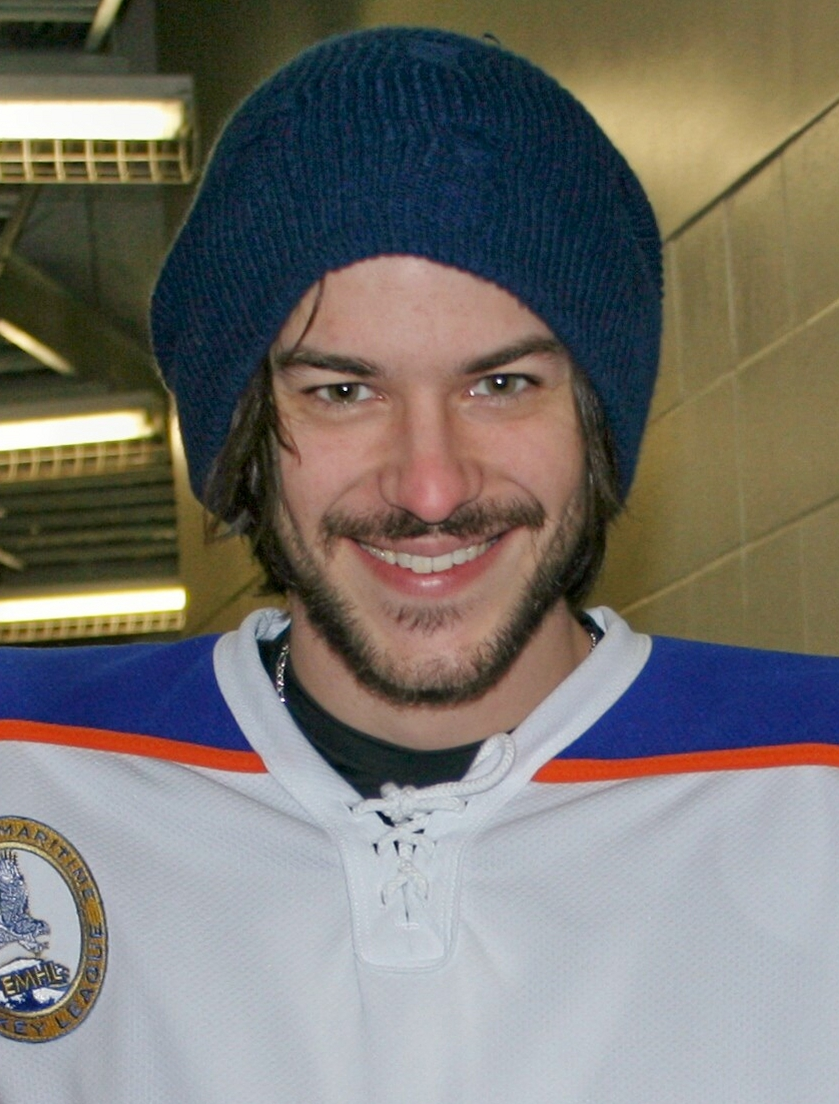
Marc-André Grondin plays Zachary.

- Marc-André Grondin as Zachary Beaulieu
- Pierre-Luc Brillant as Raymond Beaulieu
- Michel Côté as Gervais Beaulieu, the father
- Danielle Proulx as Laurianne Beaulieu, the mother
- Alex Gravel as Antoine Beaulieu, Zac's third eldest brother, an athletic, flatulent boy.
- Maxime Tremblay as Christian Beaulieu, Zac's studious eldest brother.
- Mariloup Wolfe as Brigitte, Zac's first cousin
- Francis Ducharme as Paul, Brigitte's boyfriend and interest of Zac's
- Maxime Le Flaguais as Patrick

== Production ==
=== Development ===
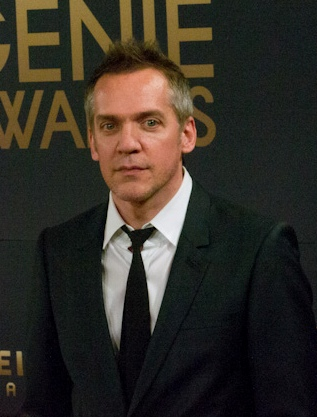
Director Jean-Marc Vallée co-wrote the screenplay and assembled the soundtrack.

Director Jean-Marc Vallée conceived of the film when he and his wife met François Boulay while staying in a cottage in the Eastern Townships, Quebec. Boulay told them about his childhood and four brothers, with memories Vallée found sometimes amusing and sometimes concerning. At Vallée's urging, Boulay later mailed Vallée a screenplay draft called Random Souvenirs of my Life based on his childhood, totaling 100 pages. Vallée added elements about the mother character and began shaping a song list. After seeing Good Will Hunting (1997), Vallée considered setting the film in Boston, but actor Michel Côté read the screenplay and persuaded Vallée that it was a fundamentally Quebec story.

Vallée and Boulay worked on the screenplay for five years, finishing by November 2000. The projected budget of $8.9 million had to be reduced to $7.3 million before some sponsorship from Telefilm Canada could be secured.

=== Filming ===
Shooting began in April 2004, but when the project ran out of money, filming temporarily ceased in the summer. Michel Côté made a personal donation to restart the project.

Sets were generally inexpensive, though the film did require a large portion of the budget for special effects. Art director Patrice Vermette made many decorations for the sets accurate for the periods. Much of the film was shot on-location in Montreal. The scenes set in Jerusalem were filmed in Essaouira, Morocco, with the sand located one kilometre from the city being employed for desert shots.

=== Music ===
Nearly 10% of the budget was spent on acquiring song rights for the soundtrack, with the cost being $600,000. Producers spent two and a half years obtaining the rights for all of them, and Vallée surrendered his salary to help pay for them. Period music is an important element of the film, highlighting characters and recurrent themes and events in Zac's coming of age. The soundtrack includes songs by Pink Floyd ("Shine On You Crazy Diamond," "The Great Gig in the Sky"), The Rolling Stones ("Sympathy for the Devil"), David Bowie ("Space Oddity"), Jefferson Airplane ("White Rabbit"), The Cure ("10:15 Saturday Night"), Giorgio Moroder ("From Here to Eternity"), Elvis Presley ("Santa Claus Is Back in Town"), and many others. "Sympathy for the Devil" alone cost $138,000, as it is used for two minutes, 25 seconds.

The Charles Aznavour song "Emmenez-moi" is repeated over and over in the film, often sung by the father. He also sings another Aznavour song—"Hier Encore", as part of Zac's 20th birthday celebrations. The title derives from the first letter in the names of the five brothers: Christian, Raymond, Antoine, Zachary and Yvan, and also refers to their father's abiding love of Patsy Cline's song "Crazy", which itself is used as a recurring motif in the film.

== Release ==
C.R.A.Z.Y. was rejected for competition in the 2005 Cannes Film Festival in April. It opened on 75 screens in Quebec on 27 May 2005. The film screened at the Toronto International Film Festival in September 2005. and the Marrakech International Film Festival in Morocco in November 2005. It played in Toronto theatres in October, and opened in Vancouver on 25 November.

By the film's screening at the AFI Fest in November 2005, distribution was sold to 40 countries. The film never had a general theatrical release in the United States, aside from film festivals. U.S. distribution rights issues were posed by the film's use of "Shine On You Crazy Diamond" by Pink Floyd.

C.R.A.Z.Y. was initially released on DVD in Quebec in October 2005, followed by TVA Films' English-language Canadian DVD in April 2006. When Vallée learned the special features on the latter did not have English subtitles, he and TVA Films planned a corrected two-disc English DVD for November.

In the wake of Vallée's death in December 2021, the film received a special tribute broadcast on the TVA network on December 29. It was also added to Quebecor's streaming platform QUB in 2021, and reentered the Canadian box office charts in the winter of 2022.

In June 2022, the film received its first significant release in the United States from Samuel Goldwyn Films, playing selected LGBTQ film festivals before going into wider commercial release. The film received a memorial screening at the 80th Venice International Film Festival in September 2023.

== Reception ==
=== Box office ===
In its first two weeks, C.R.A.Z.Y. grossed $2 million in Quebec alone. After seven weeks, the provincial gross reached C$3.6 million. By October 2005, the film made nearly $6 million in Quebec theatres, placing second in the summer season provincial box office to Star Wars Episode III: Revenge of the Sith. By March 2006, the film made over $6.2 million in Canadian theatres. By that time, the gross outside of Quebec was $3,692,417.

The film finished its run grossing $6.2 million in Quebec alone. It was the third highest-grossing film in Quebec in 2005, following Revenge of the Sith and Harry Potter and the Goblet of Fire.

=== Critical reception ===
C.R.A.Z.Y. has a 100% rating on Rotten Tomatoes, based on 31 reviews, with a weighted average of 8.1/10. The website's critics consensus reads, "Balancing heart and humor against outstanding work from a talented cast, C.R.A.Z.Y. proves the coming-of-age formula can still produce powerful results." Metacritic assigned the film a weighted average score of 81 out of 100, based on 5 critics, indicating "universal acclaim".

In Canada, Susan Walker of The Toronto Star assessed the film as "moving, funny, truthful". Martin Bilodeau praised the film in Le Devoir for its ambition and magic. In Exclaim!, Allan Tong praised it as "a funny, infectious ride through Quebecois pop culture of the '60s and '70s", and honest with vitality.

Liz Beardsworth from Empire positively reviewed the film for its acting, citing Marc-Andre Grondin and Michel Coté, and wit. Jay Weissberg from Variety declared it a "bouncy coming-of-age tale" with great music and capable performances from Cote and Grondin. Entertainment Weekly gave the film a C+, with Jeff Labrecque writing it lacked character development. Writing for BBC, Jamie Woolley remarked on the stylistic photography, found a few scenes overlong but concluded the film added up to more than the value of each scene combined.

In December 2005, it was named to the Toronto International Film Festival's annual Canada's Top Ten list of the year's best films.

In 2015, the Toronto International Film Festival placed C.R.A.Z.Y. eighth in the Top 10 Canadian Films of All Time.

=== Accolades ===
The film was submitted for consideration for the Academy Award for Best Foreign Language Film, but was not nominated.

Award	Date of ceremony	Category	Recipient(s)	Result	Ref(s)
AFI Fest	November 2005	People's Choice Award	Jean-Marc Vallée	Won	
Atlantic Film Festival	September 2005	Best Canadian Feature	Jean-Marc Vallée	Won	
Genie Awards	13 March 2006	Best Motion Picture	Pierre Even, Jean-Marc Vallée	Won	
Genie Awards	13 March 2006	Best Direction	Jean-Marc Vallée	Won	
Genie Awards	13 March 2006	Best Original Screenplay	Jean-Marc Vallée, François Boulay	Won	
Genie Awards	13 March 2006	Best Actor	Michel Côté	Won	
Genie Awards	13 March 2006	Best Actor	Marc-André Grondin	Nominated	
Genie Awards	13 March 2006	Best Supporting Actress	Danielle Proulx	Won	
Genie Awards	13 March 2006	Best Cinematography	Pierre Mignot	Nominated	
Genie Awards	13 March 2006	Best Editing	Paul Jutras	Won	
Genie Awards	13 March 2006	Best Overall Sound	Yvon Benoît, Daniel Bisson, Luc Boudrias, Bernard Gariépy Strobl	Won	
Genie Awards	13 March 2006	Best Sound Editing	Martin Pinsonnault, Mira Mailhot, Simon Meilleur, Mireille Morin, Jean-François Sauvé	Won	
Genie Awards	13 March 2006	Best Art Direction / Production Design	Patrice Vermette	Won	
Genie Awards	13 March 2006	Best Costume Design	Ginette Magny	Won	
Genie Awards	13 March 2006	Golden Reel Award	Pierre Even, Jean-Marc Vallée	Won	
Gijón International Film Festival	2005	Best Director	Jean-Marc Vallée	Won	
Gijón International Film Festival	2005	Best Screenplay	François Boulay, Jean-Marc Vallée	Won	
Gijón International Film Festival	2005	Art Direction	Patrice Vermette	Won	
Gijón International Film Festival	2005	Young Jury Prize	Jean-Marc Vallée	Won	
Jutra Awards	April 2006	Best Film	Pierre Even, Jean-Marc Vallée	Won	
Jutra Awards	April 2006	Best Direction	Jean-Marc Vallée	Won	
Jutra Awards	April 2006	Best Screenplay	Jean-Marc Vallée, François Boulay	Won	
Jutra Awards	April 2006	Best Actor	Marc-André Grondin	Won	
Jutra Awards	April 2006	Best Supporting Actor	Michel Côté	Won	
Jutra Awards	April 2006	Best Supporting Actor	Pierre-Luc Brillant	Nominated	
Jutra Awards	April 2006	Best Supporting Actress	Danielle Proulx	Won	
Jutra Awards	April 2006	Best Cinematography	Pierre Mignot	Won	
Jutra Awards	April 2006	Best Editing	Paul Jutras	Won	
Jutra Awards	April 2006	Best Art Direction	Patrice Vermette	Won	
Jutra Awards	April 2006	Best Sound	Yvon Benoît, Daniel Bisson, Luc Boudrias, Bernard Gariépy Strobl, Martin Pinsonnault, Mira Mailhot, Simon Meilleur, Mireille Morin, Jean-François Sauvé	Won	
Jutra Awards	April 2006	Best Costume Design	Ginette Magny	Won	
Jutra Awards	April 2006	Best Makeup	Micheline Trépanier	Won	
Jutra Awards	April 2006	Best Hairstyling	Réjean Goderre	Won	
Lumière Awards	5 February 2007	Best French-Language Film	Jean-Marc Vallée	Nominated	
Maine International Film Festival	2007	Audience Favorite Award	Jean-Marc Vallée	Won	
Toronto International Film Festival	8–17 September 2005	Best Canadian Film	Jean-Marc Vallée	Won	

== See also ==
- List of submissions to the 78th Academy Awards for Best Foreign Language Film
- List of Canadian submissions for the Academy Award for Best Foreign Language Film
