= Jack Waltzer =

American acting coach and actor (born 1926)

Jack Waltzer (born June 6, 1926) is an American acting coach and actor.

== Biography ==
Waltzer is a lifetime member of the Actors Studio and studied with acting teachers such as Stella Adler, Sanford Meisner, Lee Strasberg, and Uta Hagen.

He has taught acting classes in North America and Europe, including in Paris. His students have included Dustin Hoffman, Sigourney Weaver, and Sharon Stone.

In a Los Angeles Times article, Weaver credited "her newfound range with a process that began after Roman Polanski introduced her to uber-acting coach Jack Waltzer in Paris in 1993."

Dustin Hoffman personally called Waltzer to request shooting his acting class for a scene in the film Tootsie.

He turned 100 in June 2026.

== Documentary ==
The 2011 documentary Jack Waltzer: On the Craft of Acting, directed by Antoine Levannier, Christophe Dimitri Réveille, Joëlle Séchaud, and Juan Diego Solanas, pays tribute to Waltzer and his teaching and includes interviews with actors such as James Caan, Jon Voight, Elsa Zylberstein, Tomer Sisley.

The film was broadcast on French television under the title Jack Waltzer un des grands maitres américains de l'art dramatique.
