= Stereotypes (film) =

- French: Stéréotypes
- Directed by: Jean-Marc Vallée
- Written by: Sylvain Guy
- Produced by: Marcel Giroux
- Starring: André Robitaille; France Parent; Martine Francke
- Cinematography: Pierre Lambert
- Edited by: Jean-Marc Vallée
- Music by: Yves Chamberland; Monique Lacasse; Louis Babin
- Production company: GPA Films
- Release date: 1991
- Running time: 20 minutes
- Country: Canada
- Language: French

Stereotypes (French: Stéréotypes) is a Canadian fantasy short film, directed by Jean-Marc Vallée and released in 1991. The film centres on a woman who turns into a monster, and plunges her husband into a surreal alternate world, after he cheats on her.

The film was a Genie Award nominee for Best Live Action Short Drama at the 14th Genie Awards, and Vallée won the Bourse Claude-Jutra for Most Promising Filmmaker at the 1993 Rendez-vous du cinéma québécois.
