= Upside Down (2012 film) =

2012 film by Juan Diego Solanas

- French theatrical release poster
- Directed by: Juan Diego Solanas
- Written by: Juan Diego Solanas
- Produced by: Claude Léger; Dimitri Rassam; Aton Soumache; Jonathan Vanger; Alexis Vonarb
- Starring: Jim Sturgess; Kirsten Dunst
- Cinematography: Pierre Gill
- Edited by: Dominique Fortin; Paul Jutras
- Music by: Benoît Charest; Sigur Rós
- Production companies: Onyx Films; Studio 37
- Distributed by: Warner Bros. Pictures (France); Les Films Séville (Canada)
- Release dates: 22 August 2012 (Kazakhstan); 31 August 2012 (Canada); 17 April 2013 (France)
- Running time: 108 minutes
- Countries: France; Canada
- Language: English
- Budget: $50 million
- Box office: $22 million

Upside Down (French: Un monde à l'envers) is a 2012 romantic science fantasy film written and directed by Juan Diego Solanas and starring Jim Sturgess, Kirsten Dunst and Timothy Spall.

== Plot ==
Adam's two-planet home world has "dual gravity", allowing the two planets to orbit each other in extremely close proximity. Three immutable laws of gravity exist for this two-planet system:

1. All matter is only pulled by the gravity of the world that it comes from.
2. An object's weight can be offset using matter from the opposite world (inverse matter).
3. After a few hours of contact, matter in contact with inverse matter burns.

The two societies are segregated by law. While the upper world (Up Top) is rich and prosperous, the lower (Down Below) is poor. Up Top buys cheap oil from Down Below and sells electricity back to Down Below at higher prices. Contact between Down Below people and Up Top ones is forbidden, punishable by incarceration or death. People from Up Top regularly go Down Below to experience novelties like dancing on ceilings. The only official physical connection linking the two worlds is "Trans-world" company headquarters.

Adam lives in an orphanage in Down, with his only living relative being his great-aunt, whom he visits every week. Her secret flying pancakes recipe uses pollen from pink bees which gather pollen from both worlds. The recipe has passed through generations and will be inherited by Adam.

As a child, Adam secretly climbs a mountain that reaches very close to Up. There he meets Eden, a girl from Up. Meeting on the mountains, Adam uses a rope to pull Eden towards Down, and they head to the woods for a stroll. Discovered, Adam frantically releases Eden back to her world, catching a bullet in his arm and dropping her. Helpless, he watches Eden lying motionless on the ground as blood oozes from her head. When he returns home, his aunt Becky is arrested and her home burned.

Ten years later, Adam is developing an anti-gravity product which allows matter to respond to both gravitational fields at once, a cosmetic product for face-lifts. When he sees Eden on TV, he realises she is alive and working at Trans-world. Completing his formula and hired by Trans-world to develop the cream, Adam's plan is to find Eden in Trans-world. He becomes friends with Bob, a Trans-world employee from Up. Adam helps him obtain rare stamps from Down and Bob helps him contact Eden.

Bob gives Adam material to disguise himself as a worker from Up. Eden does not recognise him because of amnesia from the accident. Adam's clothes start to burn so he has to return to Down. Later on, Bob is fired. However, while leaving, he secretly gives Adam his ID to help him exit the Trans-world building and into Up. Later, calling Eden through Bob's phone, Adam gets a date.

Meanwhile, as his cosmetic cream is important for the company, Adam presents it in the lecture hall. When Eden enters and discovers his true identity, she flees. Adam runs to find her but Bob's ID, having been fired, lands him in trouble. He escapes to Bob's and he shows him that mixing liquids from both gravity fields can make a hybrid solution that resists both fields and simply floats between the two. Adam then reveals that he did not give Trans-world the main secret ingredient of his compound, leaving the company unable to manufacture the product without him.

With Bob's help, he returns to the Dos Mundos restaurant where he had met with Eden and discovers she has begun to remember him. But the police arrive and he has to run. Upon returning to his planet, he goes to the mountain top where they had met, and she comes to meet him again as they had long before. The police arrest Eden while Adam falls the remaining distance between worlds, surviving thanks to his inverse matter vest. Trans-world agrees to drop the charges against Eden if Adam gives them his formula and never contacts her again.

Adam returns to his old life, believing he will never see her again. But Eden goes to Bob for help. He finds Adam and shows him he can stay Down without the help of the opposite-matter accoutrements, using Adam's methods to negate the effect of gravity. Bob tells him he had purchased the beauty cream patent under the name Albert and Co. before Trans-world. Additionally, Bob also mentions that Adam has a "date".

Some time later, Eden is pregnant with twins, and there are towering skyscrapers on both sides; the anti-gravity formula allowed the Down world to become prosperous, and children from both sides interact through basketball.

== Cast ==
- Jim Sturgess as Adam Kirk
- Kirsten Dunst as Eden Moore
- Timothy Spall as Bob Boruchowitz
- Jayne Heitmeyer as Head Executive
- Blu Mankuma as Albert
- Holly Uloth as Paula
- Nicholas Rose as Pablo
- Heidi Hawkins as Reporter

== Release ==
The film was released on 23 August 2012 in Russia, then on 15 March 2013 in the US, in a limited capacity (11 theaters initially). It was released in France on 27 March 2013 (Mauvais Genre Film Festival) and, more generally, on 1 May 2013 through the local branch of Warner Bros., while the distribution rights were bought by Millennium Entertainment for North America and by Icon for the United Kingdom.

The film became available on Blu-ray and DVD on 25 June 2013.

== Production ==
The French production company Studio 37 initially searched for an American co-producer, and received positive response from Hollywood representatives who read the screenplay. However, because of cultural differences, they decided to look for European partners instead, as they thought it would be essential for the project to be driven primarily by its director. The film was eventually produced by Studio 37, Onyx Films and the Montreal-based company Transfilm, for a budget of $50 million.

Variety reported from the Cannes Film Market in 2009 that Kirsten Dunst and Emile Hirsch were in talks to play the film's two leading roles. A few months later the same magazine reported that Jim Sturgess had been cast instead of Hirsch.

Principal photography started in Montreal in February 2010. Filming and post-production were located in the U.S. because of the country's low taxes for film productions. Producer Dimitri Rassam said: "We couldn't have made Upside Down without the French funding system but there was no way we could have shot [in France] because the tax rebate is not attractive enough."

== Reception ==
Upside Down received a score of 29% on Rotten Tomatoes, based on 52 reviews, with an average rating of 4.8/10. The site's consensus reads, "In spite of its wonderfully unusual premise and talented cast, Upside Down fails to offer much in the way of compelling drama to anchor its admittedly dazzling visuals." Metacritic reported the film had an aggregate score of 45/100 based on 22 reviews, indicating "mixed or average reviews".

Mick LaSalle of the San Francisco Chronicle was one of several reviewers who admired the film's "brilliant" and "imaginative basis" while feeling ultimately disappointed, saying its "rich and bizarre premise is supported by fully realized visuals that make the fantastic real... it's all very enjoyable." However, he wrote, "The only problem is that, after creating the most wonderful fantastic frame, Upside Down doesn't devise a picture worthy of it. The story is serviceable. It starts small, and it stays small, even though the circumstances surrounding the story seem to cry out for something bigger."

Lewis Wallace of Wired called the film "an odd and ultimately flawed mix": "If only the story were as original, or as strong, as the film's topsy-turvy look. Unfortunately, Upside Down...invests almost all of its cinematic capital in gravity-defying eye candy." Stephen Whitty of The Star-Ledger also had a mixed reaction, praising the "wonderful visual shock" and its "marvelous sense of space and style" and writing, "Solanas' idea is a pretty audacious one, visually. A political one too, as it turns out that for generations the upper world (think Northern Hemisphere) has been getting fat exploiting the resources of the lower one (think Southern Hemisphere)," but concluding that the film "doesn't really develop its story, or its themes."

Frank Scheck of The Huffington Post found the film confusing, saying, "You practically need an advanced degree in physics to fully comprehend the convoluted physical machinations depicted in Upside Down, Juan Solanas' dizzyingly loopy sci-fi romance. Depicting the Romeo and Juliet-style romance between lovers from twin planets with opposite gravitational pulls, this head-scratcher boasts visual imagination to spare even as its logistical complexities and heavy-handed symbolism ultimately prove off-putting."

== See also ==
- Cosmicomics
- Head over Heels (2012 film)
- Patema Inverted
- Relativity (M. C. Escher)
