= Falardeau (film) =

2010 Canadian documentary film

- Directed by: Carmen Garcia; German Gutierrez
- Written by: Carmen Garcia; German Gutierrez
- Produced by: Carmen Garcia
- Starring: Pierre Falardeau
- Cinematography: German Gutierrez
- Edited by: Hélène Girard
- Production company: Argus Films
- Distributed by: K-Films Amérique
- Release date: October 20, 2010 (FNC)
- Running time: 80 minutes
- Country: Canada
- Language: French

Falardeau is a Canadian documentary film, directed by German Gutierrez and Carmen Garcia and released in 2010. The film profiles Pierre Falardeau, a filmmaker who was an important figure in the Cinema of Quebec.

The film premiered at the 2010 Festival du nouveau cinéma.

The film won the Prix Jutra for Best Documentary Film at the 13th Jutra Awards in 2011.
