= Montreal Insectarium =

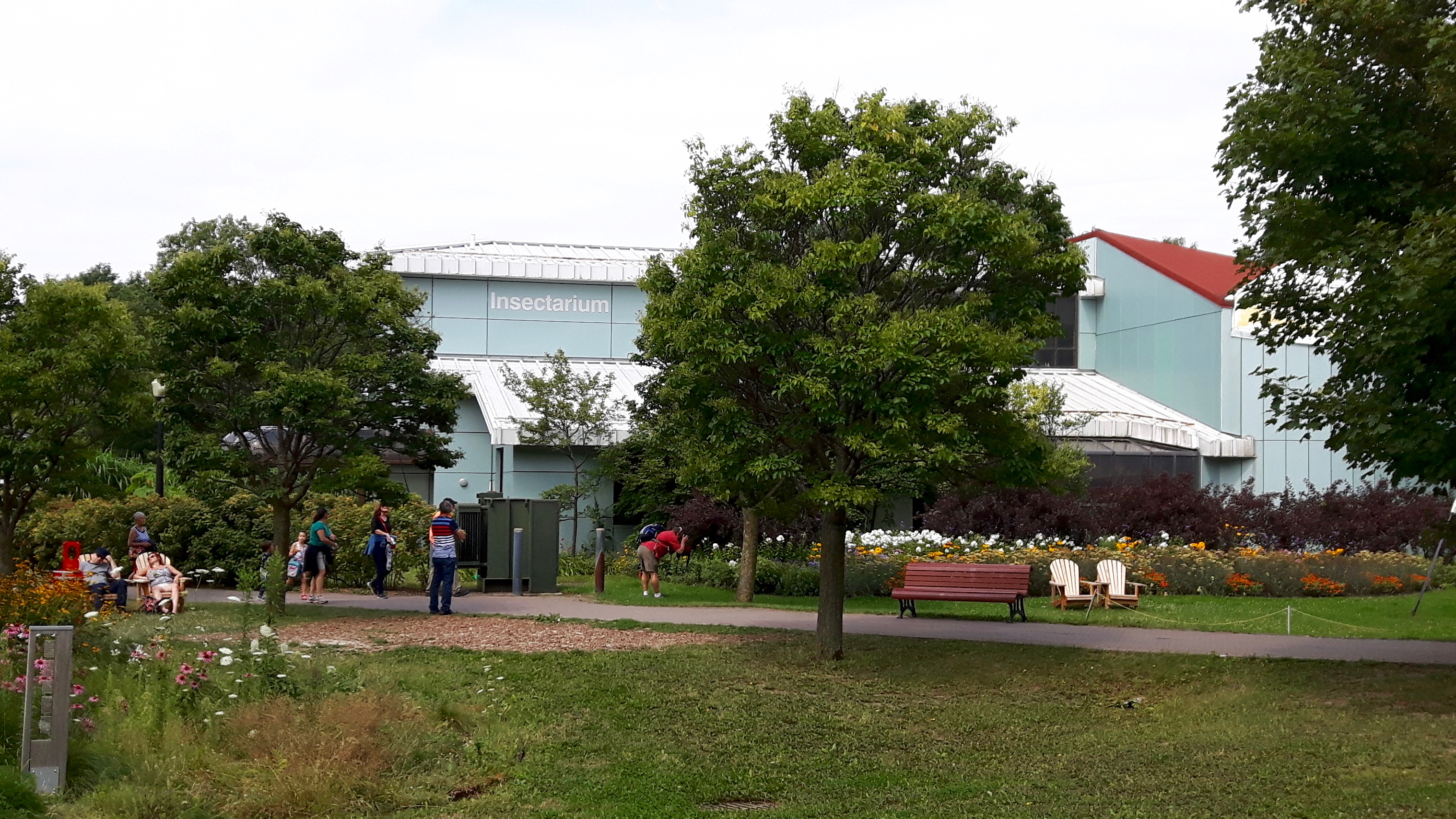
- Montreal Insectarium
- Interactive map of Montreal Insectarium
- 45°33′39″N 73°33′28″W
- Date opened: February 7, 1990
- Location: 4581 Sherbrooke Street East; Montreal, Quebec; H1X 2B2
- No. of animals: 160,000
- No. of species: 95
- Annual visitors: 695,404 (2011) including Montreal Botanical Garden
- Memberships: CMA, CHIN, and Virtual Museum of Canada
- Public transit: Pie-IX; Viau
- Website: espacepourlavie.ca/en/insectarium

The Montreal Insectarium (French: Insectarium de Montréal) is a natural history museum located in Montreal, Quebec, Canada, featuring a large quantity of insects from all around the world. It is the largest insect museum in North America and among the largest insectariums worldwide. It was founded by Georges Brossard and opened on February 7, 1990. Its average attendance is 400,000 visitors per year. It displays both live and dead insect collections, from butterflies to bees and ants.

It is one of the city's most popular tourist attractions, along with the Montreal Botanical Garden, Planetarium and the Montreal Biodome.

== Affiliations ==
The Museum is affiliated with: CMA, CHIN, and Virtual Museum of Canada.

== Photos ==
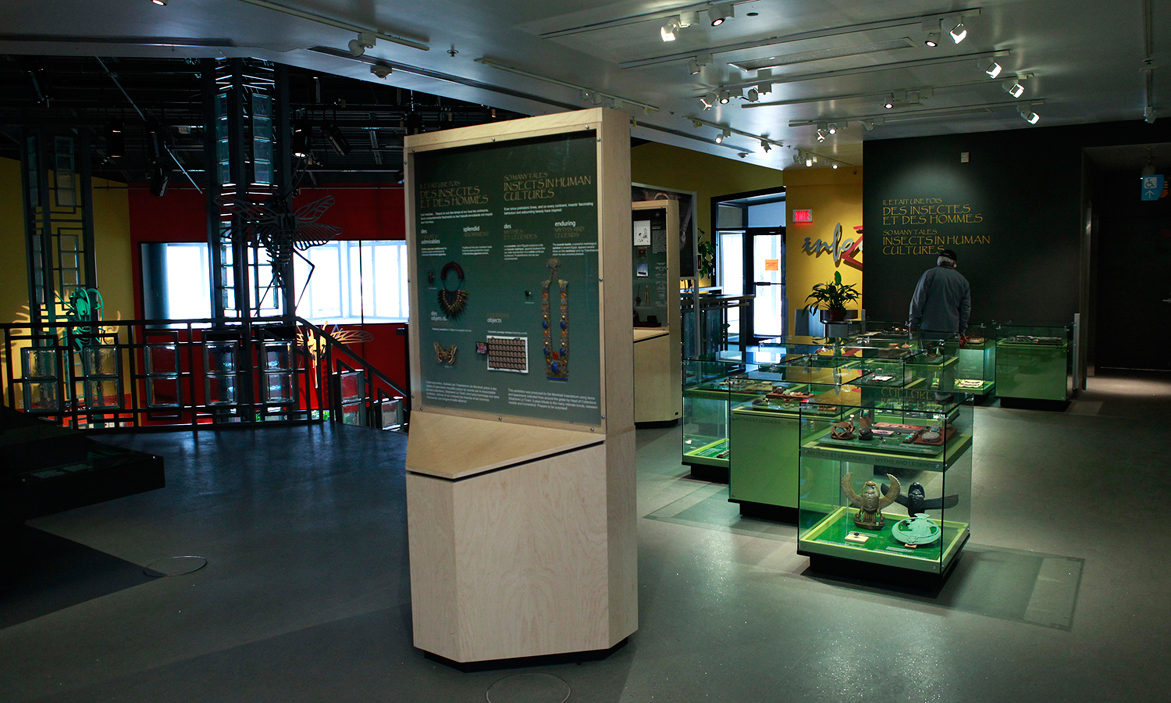
Montreal Insectarium

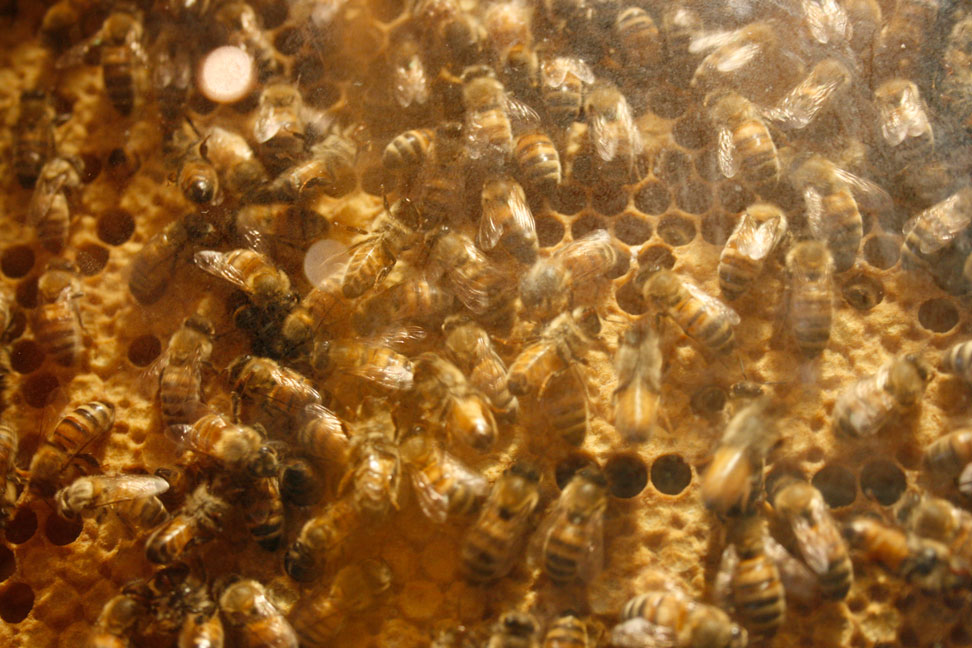
Bee display

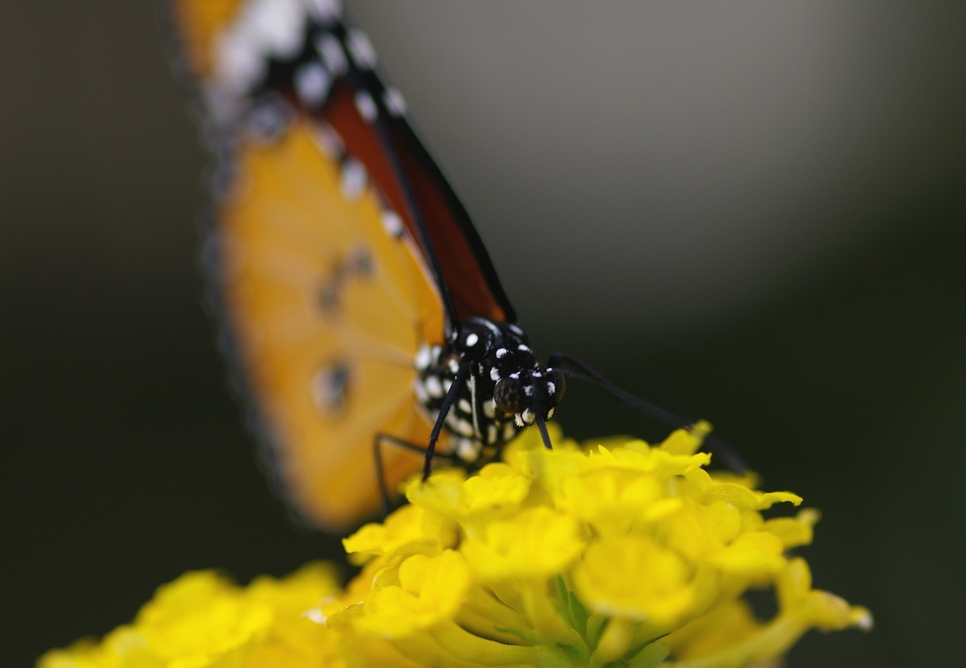
Danaus chrysippus

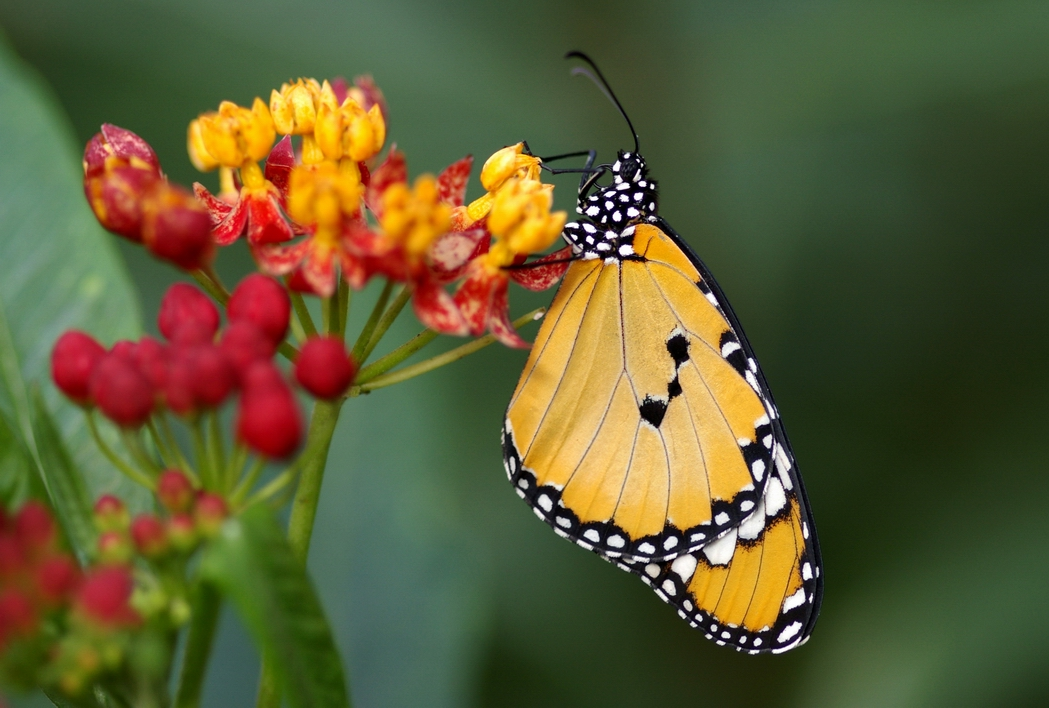
Danaus chrysippus on Asclepias

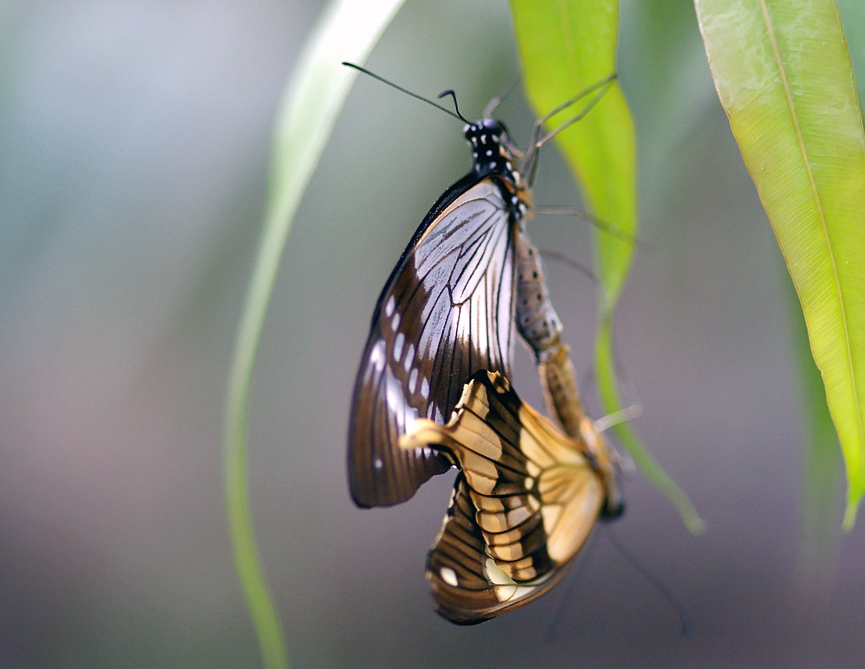
Papilio dardanus

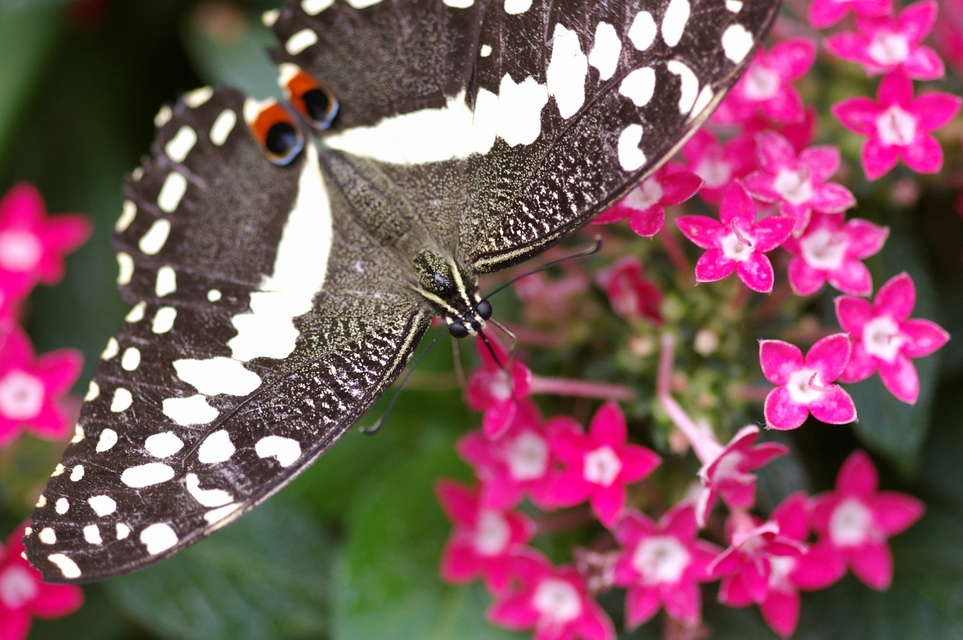
Papilio demodocus

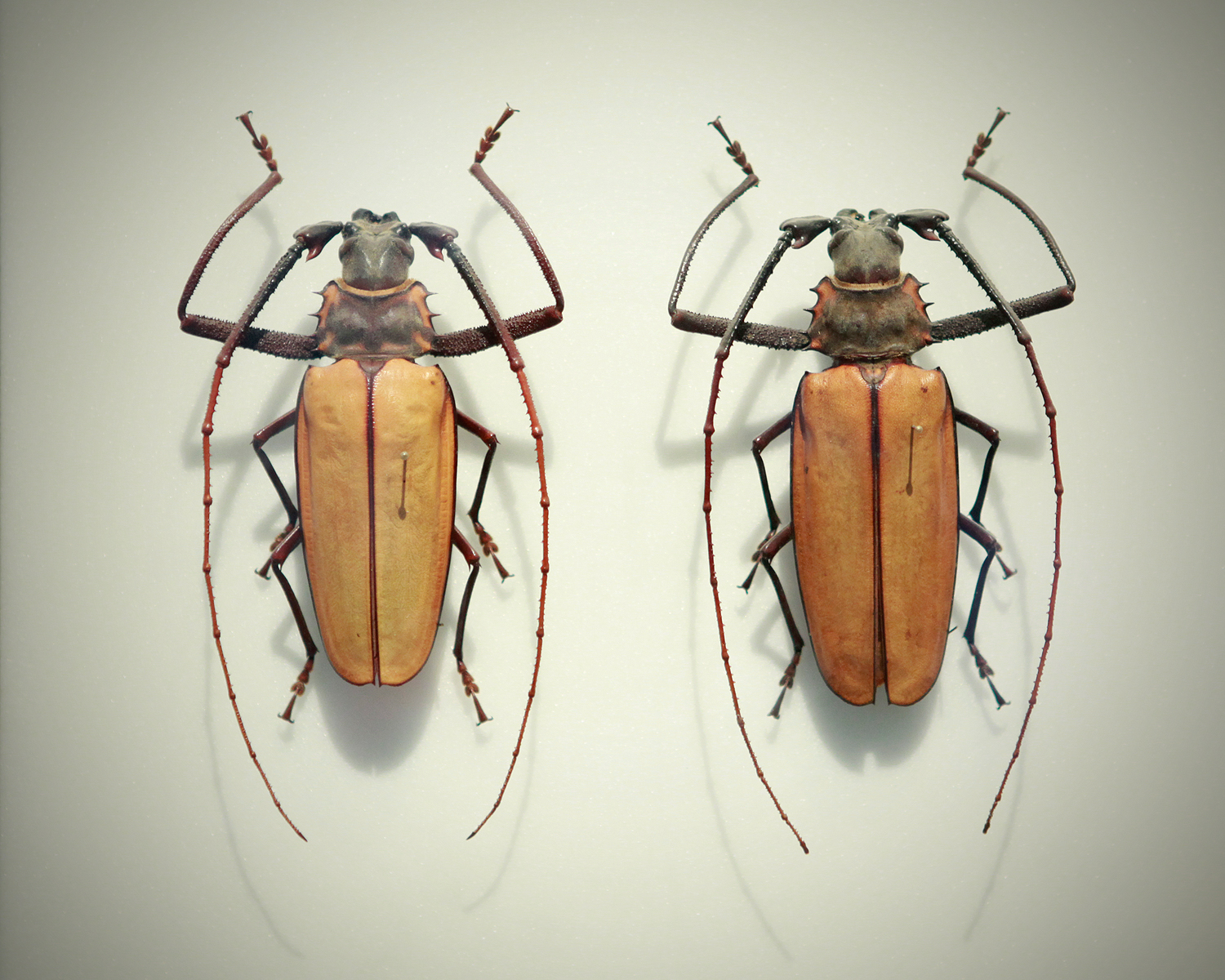
Insect Display

== See also ==
- International Centre of Insect Physiology and Ecology (in Nairobi in Kenya)
- Monsanto Insectarium (in St. Louis in Missouri in the US)
