= Insectia =

1999 Canadian TV documentary series

- Genre: Nature documentary
- Created by: Georges Brossard, Denis Blaquire, Charles Domingue
- Written by: Denis Blacquière, Nathalie Lautier
- Directed by: German Gutierrez
- Starring: Georges Brossard
- Original language: English
- No. of seasons: 2
- No. of episodes: 26

Production
- Executive producers: André Barro, Jacquelin Bouchard, Fabienne Servan-Schreiber
- Producers: Mary Armstrong, Florence Hamel
- Editors: Dominique Champagne, Annie Jean, Jean-Marie Drot
- Running time: 22 minutes (30 minutes with commercials)

Original release
- Network: Discovery Channel
- Release: February 4, 1999 – April 13, 2001

Insectia is a Canadian nature documentary program that premiered on the Discovery Channel on February 4, 1999. The show's host, Georges Brossard, explains the life of insects by traveling around the world and introducing specimens in their natural habitat. Shot in 1998, it is the first Canadian documentary program to be filmed in high definition resolution. It aired on the now-defunct Discovery HD Theater in high definition after the channel's launch in 2002.

== Episodes ==
=== Season 1 ===
No.	Title	Original release date
1	"Invertebrate Inventors"	February 4, 1999
2	"Silent Partners"	February 11, 1999
3	"New World Order"	February 18, 1999
4	"Myths and Legends"	February 25, 1999
5	"Living Art"	March 4, 1999
6	"Wicked Butterflies"	March 11, 1999
7	"The Mating Game"	March 18, 1999
8	"Insect Gods"	March 25, 1999
9	"Insects A La Carte"	April 1, 1999
10	"Champions of Evolution"	April 8, 1999
11	"Six-legged Warriors"	April 15, 1999
12	"Child's Play"	April 22, 1999
13	"Mad About Bugs"	May 9, 1999

=== Season 2 ===
No.	Title	Original release date
1	"Insects at the End of the World"	January 12, 2001
2	"Entomology Is Catching"	January 19, 2001
3	"Scorpions"	January 26, 2001
4	"Life in the Desert"	February 8, 2001
5	"Symphony of the Hexapods"	February 16, 2001
6	"Weaver's Island"	February 23, 2001
7	"Life in a Single Tree"	March 3, 2001
8	"Insects for Sale"	March 9, 2001
9	"The Grand Alliance"	March 16, 2001
10	"Aquatic Insects"	March 23, 2001
11	"Masquerade"	March 30, 2001
12	"Outlaws"	April 6, 2001
13	"Time Travellers"	April 13, 2001
