= Georges Brossard =

Canadian entomologist (1940–2019)

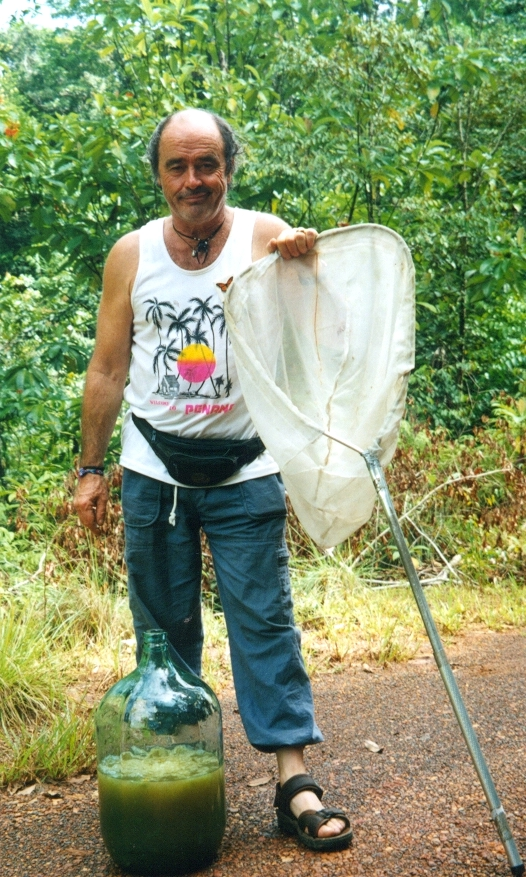
- Brossard in 1998, while filming Insectia
- Born: 11 February 1940; La Prairie, Quebec
- Died: 26 June 2019 (aged 79); Saint-Mathieu-de-Beloeil, Quebec, Canada
- Occupation: Entomology
- Awards: Order of Canada, National Order of Quebec

Georges Brossard, CM CQ (February 11, 1940 – June 26, 2019) was a Canadian entomologist and founder of the Montreal Insectarium. He died on June 26, 2019, at the age of 79.

== Biography ==
An insect enthusiast from a very early age, Brossard held a career as a notary until the age of 38. He then started to travel, and on his travels studied the insects he came across with deep interest. In 1989, after having collected over 250,000 specimens, he solicited the then mayor of Montreal, Jean Doré, to open an insectarium. He and Pierre Bourque, then director of the Montreal Botanical Gardens, began a partnership to govern and operate the Montreal Insectarium. Brossard has founded four other insectariums across the globe, some of which are located as far as Shanghai and South Africa. Since the opening of the Montreal Insectarium, his collection, which he continued to amass through his travels, has grown to over 500,000 specimens.

Brossard wrote and directed 20 episodes of Mémoires d'insectes ("Insect Diaries"), and was the creator and host of the televised series Insectia. He was the cofounder and copresident of Montreal's Cinéma IMAX les Ailes.

In 2004, he was the subject of the fiction film Le Papillon Bleu (The Blue Butterfly) directed by Léa Pool, based on an event in Brossard's life which occurred in 1987. Working for the Children's Wish Foundation of Canada, Brossard traveled to South America with a boy named David Marenger who was in the terminal phase of cancer. It was David's dream to catch a mythical blue morpho butterfly, Georges went to great lengths to find in the vast jungles, even putting his and the boy's lives in danger. They finally caught the butterfly, and upon returning to Québec, the cancer which had been slowly killing David miraculously receded.

Georges Brossard died on June 26, 2019, at the Victor-Gadbois de Saint-Mathieu-de-Beloeil palliative care centre. He was 79 years of age. He had been admitted to the facility on June 18, suffering from lung cancer.

== Awards ==
- 1999 – Member of the Order of Canada
- Recipient of the Queen Elizabeth II Golden Jubilee Medal
- Léon-Provencher Prize from the Société d’Entomologie du Québec
- Louis-Riel Medal
- Doctorats Honoris Causa in sciences at Université du Québec à Trois-Rivières
- Doctorats Honoris Causa in sciences at McGill University.
- 2006 – Knight of the National order of Quebec

== See also ==
- List of entomologists
- Lists of Canadians#Scientists
