= German Gutierrez (director) =

- Born: Colombia
- Occupation: Director
- Years active: 1998-present
- Known for: Co-directing the film Falardeau
- Notable work: Insectia; Who Shot My Brother?; The Wanted 18; Honour to Senator Murray Sinclair

German Gutierrez is a Colombian-Canadian documentary film and television director based in Montreal, Quebec. He is most noted as co-director with his wife, Carmen Garcia, of the 2012 documentary film Falardeau, which was the winner of the Prix Jutra for Best Documentary Film at the 13th Jutra Awards in 2011.

He was previously nominated in the same category at the 8th Jutra Awards in 2006 for Who Shot My Brother? (Qui a tiré sur mon frère?).

He was born and raised in Colombia, before moving to Canada in his early 20s, where he worked for the National Film Board of Canada as a cinematographer and director. Who Shot My Brother? profiled a real-life assassination attempt on his brother, Colombian political activist Oscar Gutierrez, and was the winner of the Radio-Canada People's Choice Award at the 2005 Festival du nouveau cinéma.

His other directorial credits have included the television documentary series Insectia, and the film The Coca-Cola Case, with his credits as a cinematographer including the films The Wanted 18 and Honour to Senator Murray Sinclair. He won a Gemini Award for Best Photography in a Documentary Program or Series at the 14th Gemini Awards in 1999, and was nominated in the same category at the 16th Gemini Awards in 2001, for Insectia.

His most recent documentary film, History Will Judge, was released in 2022.
