= The Elephant Song =

The Elephant Song is a Canadian stage play by Nicolas Billon, first presented in 2002 and since performed across Canada and around the world. There is also a film adaptation of the play, released in 2014.

== History ==
The Elephant Song, by Canadian playwright Nicolas Billon, was first presented with a reading at Infinitheatre, Montreal.

The Elephant Song was played on stage in Montreal multiple times, as well as in Stratford and St John's in Canada, and internationally in Australia, USA, England, Turkey, and Korea.

The UK premiere of The Elephant Song opened at Park Theatre London 2023 produced by OnBook Theatre. director Jason Moore, set and costume designer Ian Nicholas, Lighting and sound Eliott Sheppard. Jon Osbaldeston as Dr Greenberg, Gwithian Evans as Michael and Louise Faulkner as Miss Perterson. Assistant director Luke Mazzamuto

== Synopsis ==
The play is about events following the sudden disappearance of a psychiatrist, Dr. Lawrence, from a mental institution and possible involvement of a young patient of the hospital, Michael, in the disappearance.

Michael is a disturbed son of an opera singer and a distant father, he has only seen him once. The elephant connection is when, in their sole meeting together in a nature reserve, the father kills an elephant in front of his son. The incident traumatizes the very young Michael. His mother's cold attitude and her distancing herself from him for a singing career also affect this.

Toby Green, an independent psychiatrist is assigned to investigate Michael's involvement as Michael draws the doctor into a psychological mind game involving his past experiences with parents, with Michael claiming he was the cause of his mother's death as he refused to call an ambulance and sang instead the "elephant song" to her until she died on the floor. He discusses the circumstances of his forced stay in the hospital, he hints at doctor-patient improper relationships involving him and his supervising doctor, and a bizarre relationship with the head nurse. Michael's ploys include an attempt to negotiate an early release from the hospital, etc., with his plot ending in great tragedy when he finally convinces the investigating doctor to hand him a box of chocolates. Being strongly allergic to them, he died in the hands of the doctor and the head nurse after having consumed a number of the chocolates he acquired.

== Presentations ==
=== Canada ===
- 2002: Reading at Infinitheatre, Montreal, Canada
- 2003: Reading at Stratford Festival of Canada, Stratford, Canada
- 2004: Play at Stratford Festival of Canada, Stratford, Canada
- 2005: Play at Théâtre d’Aujourd’hui, Montreal, Canada
- 2007: Play at Infinitheatre, Montreal, Canada
- 2008: Play at Beothuk Street Players, St-John's, Canada
- 2010: Play at Théâtre Meka, Montreal, Canada

=== International ===
- 2007: Play at Cairns Little Theatre, Cairns, Australia
- 2008: Reading at hotINK International Festival, New York City, USA
- 2008: Reading at Workshop Theater Company, New York City, USA
- 2009: Reading at Crossing the Divide Festival, London, England
- 2011: Play at Bakehouse Theatre, Adelaide, Australia
- 2013–14: Play at Théâtre du Petit Montparnasse, Paris, France
- 2015: Play at Ali Poyrazoğlu Theatre, Istanbul, Turkey
- 2015: Play at Suhyeonjae Theatre, Seoul, Korea
- 2016: Play at DCF DaeMyung Theatre, Seoul, Korea
- 2017, 2019: Play at Yes24 stage3 (the former Suhyeonjae Theatre), Seoul, Korea
- 2023: Play at Park Theatre London, UK
- 2024: Play at Liepaja Theatre, Latvia

== Publications ==
- La Chanson de l’Éléphant (French) by Éditions Lémeac (August 2005, ISBN 2-7609-0394-X)
- The Elephant Song (English) by Playwrights Canada Press (June 2006, ISBN 0-88754-846-6)

== Film adaptation ==
The play was adapted into a drama film directed by Charles Binamé and released in 2014. with Bruce Greenwood as Toby Green, Xavier Dolan as Michael. The film premiered at the 2014 Toronto International Film Festival.
