= Who Shot My Brother? =

2005 Canadian documentary film

- French: Qui a tiré sur mon frère?
- Directed by: Carmen Garcia; German Gutierrez
- Written by: Carmen Garcia; German Gutierrez
- Produced by: Carmen Garcia; Yves Bisaillon
- Narrated by: Luis de Cespedes
- Cinematography: German Gutierrez; Juan Cantero; Ricardo Restrepo
- Edited by: Jean-Marie Drot
- Music by: Jimmy Tanaka
- Production company: Argus Films
- Distributed by: National Film Board of Canada
- Release date: October 13, 2005 (FNC)
- Running time: 96 minutes
- Country: Canada
- Languages: English; Spanish

Who Shot My Brother? (French: Qui a tiré sur mon frère?) is a Canadian documentary film, directed by German Gutierrez and Carmen Garcia and released in 2005. The film investigates an assassination attempt on Gutierrez's brother Oscar, a regional assemblyman and political activist in Colombia.

The film premiered at the 2005 Festival du nouveau cinéma, where it was the winner of the Radio-Canada People's Choice Award. It subsequently had a limited theatrical release in Quebec, before being distributed in the rest of Canada as an episode of the CBC Television documentary series The Passionate Eye in 2006.

The film was a Prix Jutra nominee for Best Documentary Film at the 8th Jutra Awards in 2006.
