= The Rocket (2005 film) =

- Film poster
- Directed by: Charles Binamé
- Written by: Ken Scott
- Produced by: Daniel Louis; Denise Robert
- Starring: Roy Dupuis; Julie Le Breton; Stephen McHattie
- Cinematography: Pierre Gill
- Edited by: Michel Arcand
- Music by: Michel Cusson
- Production company: Alliance Atlantis Vivafilm
- Distributed by: Motion Picture Distribution LP
- Release date: 25 November 2005
- Running time: 124 mins
- Country: Canada
- Languages: French; English
- Budget: 8,000,000

The Rocket (Canadian French: Maurice Richard, also known as The Rocket: The Legend of Rocket Richard and The Rocket: The Maurice Richard Story) is a French-Canadian biopic about the ice hockey player Maurice "The Rocket" Richard. It stars Roy Dupuis and was directed by Charles Binamé. It features appearances by National Hockey League players Mike Ricci, Sean Avery, Vincent Lecavalier, Philippe Sauvé, Stéphane Quintal, Ian Laperrière and Pascal Dupuis.

== Plot ==
The film depicts an era widely considered a cornerstone of the NHL's history. It shows the life of 'The Rocket' beginning with his years as a teenager, his ascension to the Montreal Canadiens, up to the Richard Riot, showing a full spectrum of Richard's career. It ends the year before Richard brought Montréal to an unrivaled record of five Stanley Cup Championships in a row.

The film begins as the Canadiens coach argues for continuing the hockey game even though the Richard Riot is occurring. The film then rolls to Maurice labouring as a teenager. Maurice later plays hockey for a minor league and soon tries out for the Canadiens and makes it on the team. Maurice scores several goals but is injured early in his first season. People begin to call Maurice a lemon and a waste of money. Maurice recovers from his injury but is asked to sit out. Later he and his wife receive a baby girl who weighs 9 pounds (4 kg). Maurice goes to his coach and asks to exchange the number 15 for the number 9. Maurice will continue to play and breaks the record of 44 goals in one season. In a game with the New York Rangers, he encounters Bob Dill, a player sent out to attack Maurice to prevent him from beating the record. Maurice however, takes out Dill.

As the movie proceeds, other players attempt to take out Maurice but Maurice fights back. At one point Maurice is tripped and is required to have stitches. Maurice receives the stitches but continues playing near the end of the game and scores the game-winning goal. Later on, a referee grabs Maurice and allows the other hockey player to hit him; Maurice retaliates by hitting the referee. He is given a penalty denying him from playing for the rest of the season and the playoffs and the Richard Riot begins. Maurice gives a speech to Montréal telling that he won't give up and will return next year. The movie shows a few goals from the real Maurice Richard. The film ends as Maurice walks out the stadium with a message that says "Maurice played for 5 more years" and "During which, he won 5 Stanley Cups in a row."

== Cast ==
Maurice Richard	Roy Dupuis
Lucille Richard	Julie Le Breton
Dick Irvin	Stephen McHattie
Mr. Norchet	Michel Barrette
Elmer Lach	Mike Ricci
Émile Bouchard	Patrice Robitaille
Bob Fillion	Sebastien Roberts
Jean Béliveau	Vincent Lecavalier
Bernie Geoffrion	Ian Laperrière
Toe Blake	Randy Thomas
Tommy Gorman	Philip Craig
Bob Dill	Sean Avery
Frank Selke	Tony Calabretta
Clarence Campbell	Tedd Dillon
Milt Schmidt	Pascal Dupuis
Dollard St. Laurent	Stéphane Quintal
Jim Henry	Philippe Sauvé
Alice Norchet	Diane Lavallée

== Production ==
The dialogue and hockey scenes were produced to be as true to reality as possible; they were reviewed by Richard himself before he died and also by his wife, his children, and Dick Irvin, Jr.'s written and recorded testimonies and memories about his father and reporters from the era. The events presented as facts and the dialogue have been researched thoroughly to present the most factually accurate film possible. Many sources were consulted for facts within the movie, including family, friends, the public, the media recording those events, various journalists reporting on the events of that time, Richard's barber, and previous teams in the juvenile league (he played for five different teams in different leagues).

The film was shot in Quebec by Cinémaginaire for a budget of (CAD) $8,000,000 and distributed by Alliance Atlantis and Odeon.

== Distribution ==
Maurice Richard was first released in French throughout Québec in November 2005, then throughout Canada with English subtitles in April 2006. The distribution rights were marketed at the Cannes Film Festival by Telefilm Canada, whose press release of 30 May 2006, reported that "Cinémaginaire producer Denise Robert signed deals for The Rocket (Maurice Richard) with Sweden, Finland, Iceland, Norway, and Denmark. It was released in the United States as The Rocket: The Legend of Rocket Richard and was distributed by Palm Pictures.

== Awards and recognition ==
The film was nominated in 13 categories for the 27th Genie Awards in 2007, winning nine awards:

- Best Performance by an Actor in a Leading Role: Roy Dupuis
- Best Performance by an Actress in a Leading Role: Julie Le Breton
- Best Performance by an Actor in a Supporting Role: Stephen McHattie
- Best Direction: Charles Binamé
- Best Art Direction/Production Design: Michel Proulx
- Best Cinematography: Pierre Gill
- Best Costume Design: Francesca Chamberland
- Best Editing: Michel Arcand
- Best Sound Editing: Claude Beaugrand, Olivier Calvert, Jérôme Décarie, Natalie Fleurant, Francine Poirier

Nominations:

- Best Motion Picture: Denise Robert, Daniel Louis (lost to Bon Cop, Bad Cop)
- Best Music – Original Score: Michel Cusson (lost to Without Her)
- Best Overall Sound: Claude Hazanavicius, Claude Beaugrand, Luc Boudrias, Bernard Gariépy Strobl (lost to Bon Cop, Bad Cop)
- Best Original Screenplay: Ken Scott (lost to Congorama)

It was also nominated for a Jutra Award in 14 categories, including Best Actor for Roy Dupuis; but it did not receive the award.

The film was screened in competition at Tokyo International Film Festival where Dupuis won the "Best Actor" prize.

== See also ==
- List of films about ice hockey
