= Pierre Billon (writer) =

Canadian writer

- Born: June 15, 1937 (age 89); Geneva, Switzerland

Pierre Billon (born June 15, 1937 in Geneva, Switzerland) is a novelist and screenwriter from Quebec.

His son Nicolas Billon is also a noted writer.

== Bibliography ==
=== Novels ===
- L'ogre de Barbarie (1972)
- La Chausse-Trappe (1980)
- L'enfant du Cinquième Nord (Mamatowee Awashis) (1983)
- Le Livre de Seul (1983)
- L'ultime Alliance (1990)
- The Children's Wing (English translation of L'enfant du Cinquième Nord) (1996)
- Un Bâillement du Diable (1998)
- Dans le secret des Dieux (2008)

=== Screenplays (film) ===
- Battle of the Brave (Nouvelle-France) (2004)
- Daniel et les Superdogs (2003)
- Séraphin: Heart of Stone (Séraphin: un homme et son péché)(2002)

=== Screenplays (TV) ===
- Mémoires en fuite (2000)
- Que reste-t-il... (2000)
- L'enfant des Appalaches (1997)
- La présence des ombres (1995)
- Une Petite Fille Particulière (1995)
