= Juan Diego Solanas =

Argentine film director

Juan Solanas
- Born: 4 November 1966 (age 59); Buenos Aires, Argentina
- Occupations: Film director Screenwriter; Film producer
- Years active: 1998–present

Juan Solanas (born 4 November 1966) is an Argentine film director, producer, screenwriter and cinematographer.

His film Nordeste was screened in the Un Certain Regard section at the 2005 Cannes Film Festival. He directed the French-Canadian production Upside Down (2012), starring Jim Sturgess and Kirsten Dunst. He is the son of Argentinian film director and Senator Fernando "Pino" Solanas.

== Filmography ==
- The Man Without a Head (2003)
- Nordeste (2005)
- Jack Waltzer: On the Craft of Acting (2011)
- Upside Down (2012)
- Que sea ley (2019)
