= Marguerite Volant =

TV miniseries

- Genre: Drama
- Starring: Catherine Sénart; Michael Sapieha
- Country of origin: Canada
- Original language: French
- No. of seasons: 1
- No. of episodes: 11

Original release
- Network: Radio-Canada
- Release: 1996

Marguerite Volant is a Canadian television drama series first aired in 1996.

== Cast ==
- Catherine Sénart as Marguerite Volant
- Michael Sapieha as James Elliot Chase
- Normand D'Amour as Laval Chevigny
- Phillipe Cousineau as Antoine de Courval
- Veronique Le Flaguais as Isabeau de Rouville
- Gilbert Sicotte as Claude Volant
- Pascale Bussieres as Eleanore Volant
- Stéphane Gagnon as Lambert Volant
- Angele Coutu as Eugénie Beaubassin
- Jean-Emery Gagnon as Vincent Léry
- Pierre Curzi as Renaud Larochelle
- Benoît Dagenais as Père Godefroy Volant
- Pascale Montpetit as Jeanne Letellier
- Benoît Briére as Blaise Melancon
