= Jean-Marc Vallée =

Canadian filmmaker (1963–2021)

Jean-Marc Vallée OC OQ
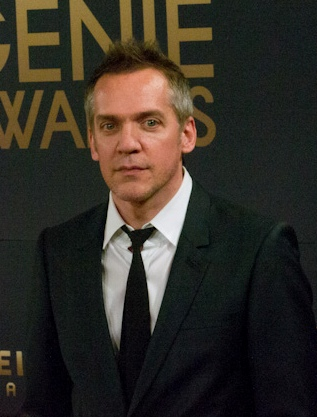
- Vallée at the 2012 Genie Awards
- Born: March 9, 1963; Montreal, Quebec, Canada
- Died: December 25, 2021 (aged 58); Berthier-sur-Mer, Quebec, Canada
- Education: Collège Ahuntsic; Université de Montréal
- Occupations: Director; editor; producer; screenwriter
- Years active: 1985–2021
- Spouse: Chantal Cadieux (m. 1990; div. 2006)
- Children: 2

Jean-Marc Vallée OC OQ (French pronunciation: [ʒɑ̃maʁk vale]; March 9, 1963 – December 25, 2021) was a Canadian filmmaker. After studying film at the Université de Montréal, Vallée went on to make a number of critically acclaimed short films, including Stéréotypes (1991), Les Fleurs magiques (1995), and Les Mots magiques (1998).

His debut feature, Black List (French: Liste noire) (1995), was nominated for nine Genie Awards, including nods for Vallée's direction and editing. His fourth feature film, C.R.A.Z.Y. (2005), received further critical acclaim and was a financial success. Due to Vallée's perfectionism, and the tight budget, the film took almost ten years to make. Vallée's follow-up, The Young Victoria (2009), garnered strong reviews and received three Academy Award nominations. He was offered this film by producer Graham King, who was impressed by C.R.A.Z.Y. and wanted Vallée to make something similar. Vallée was initially unsure about accepting this offer, as he didn't much care about period films, or the British monarchy. However, his love for a cinematic challenge won out, and he researched Queen Victoria in great depth before starting the film. His sixth film, Café de Flore (2011), was the most nominated film at the 32nd Genie Awards. Vallée's next films, the American dramas Dallas Buyers Club (2013) and Wild (2014) continued this acclaim and the former earned him a nomination for the Academy Award for Best Film Editing. He was a member of the Academy of Motion Picture Arts and Sciences in the Director's Branch from 2014 until his death in 2021.

He was known for his naturalistic approach to filming, encouraging actors to improvise during takes, and used natural lighting and handheld cameras. He described himself as being like "a kid on a set. A kid playing with a huge toy and having fun".

Vallée ventured into television by executive producing and directing two projects for HBO, the drama series Big Little Lies (2017) and the thriller miniseries Sharp Objects (2018). For the former, he won the Primetime Emmy Award for Outstanding Directing for a Limited or Anthology Series or Movie.

== Early life ==
Vallée was born and raised in Montreal, Quebec, one of four children of Gérald Vallée and Jacqueline Charette. He studied filmmaking at the Collège Ahuntsic and the Université de Montréal.

== Career ==
=== 1980s: Music videos and short films ===
Vallée's earliest-known works include five music videos he wrote and directed in August 1985. The music videos were part of a project by Les Productions Perfo 30 to produce 30 music videos in 30 days for a total budget of not over $50,000 CAD. Les Productions Perfo 30 had been founded earlier that year in May 1985 by André Fortin, Martin-Éric Ouellette and Martin Saint-Pierre, and wound up producing a total of 32 music videos, all directed during the month of August, with editing spanning September and October.

Vallée was one of four directors (along with Fortin, Ouellette and Claude Grégoire) to helm directorial duties. His music videos included Wild Touch's My Chick Is In My Bed, Glockenspiel's Odeline, Park Avenue's Don't Talk To Strangers, Angel's Angel's Evolution and New News' The Splice Of Life. The music videos premiered theatrically at the Spectrum in Montreal on November 1, 1985, for a limited press screening, then officially on November 9, 1985, for the general public. The music videos later aired on Canadian television through MuchMusic.

In the 1990s, Vallée produced a number of short films that aroused considerable critical interest. In 1991, Stéréotypes, a fantastique comedy inspired by some American classic films, received numerous prizes at several events, including Best Promising Director for Vallée at the Rendez-vous du cinéma québécois.

Vallée later adopted a more personal and autobiographical tone with Magical Flowers (Les Fleurs magiques) (1995) and Magical Words (Les Mots magiques) (1998), awarded respectively Best Short Film at the 16th Genie Awards and the 1st Jutra Awards, in which the director explored the relationship between father and son.

=== 1995–2005: Directorial film debut ===
Vallée made his feature-length debut in 1995 with Liste noire (Black List), which became the highest-grossing film in Quebec that year and received nine Genie Award nominations, including Best Motion Picture and Best Achievement in Direction. In the wake of this success, Vallée moved to Los Angeles where he directed Los Locos (1998), a Western film written by and starring Mario Van Peebles, and Loser Love (1999). After these two low-budget productions, he directed two episodes of the television series The Secret Adventures of Jules Verne (2000).

During the mid-1990s, Vallée was preparing C.R.A.Z.Y. from a screenplay inspired by his own youth and that of his co-writer, François Boulay. Vallée wanted to shoot the film in the United States, but his friend Michel Côté, who also starred in Black List, convinced him to shoot in Quebec. After ten years in production, C.R.A.Z.Y. was finally released in 2005 and became one of the most successful films in Quebec history, both financially and critically.

It tells the story of Zachary Beaulieu, a young man dealing with homophobia and heterosexism while growing up with four brothers and a conservative father in 1960s and 1970s Quebec. The role of Zachary Beaulieu was portrayed by Marc-André Grondin, while Michel Côté and Danielle Proulx starred as Zachary's parents. C.R.A.Z.Y. had its world premiere at the 2005 Toronto International Film Festival and was awarded Best Canadian Feature Film. It received praise from critics, with the film aggregator website, Rotten Tomatoes, giving the film a 100% rating, based on reviews from 31 critics. It received several accolades, including eleven Genie Awards and thirteen Jutra Awards. C.R.A.Z.Y. was also selected as Canada's official submission for the 2005 Academy Award for Best Foreign Language Film.

=== 2009–2015: Established career ===
==== The Young Victoria (2009) ====
After the success of C.R.A.Z.Y., Graham King and Martin Scorsese hired Jean-Marc Vallée to direct the period drama The Young Victoria. Written by Julian Fellowes, the film is based on the early life and reign of Queen Victoria, and her marriage to Prince Albert of Saxe-Coburg and Gotha. The film stars Emily Blunt, Rupert Friend, Paul Bettany, Miranda Richardson, and Jim Broadbent among a large ensemble cast. Critical reception was generally positive and the film was nominated for three Academy Awards, winning the 2009 Academy Award for Best Costume Design.

==== Café de Flore (2011) ====
In 2011, Vallée wrote, directed, and edited Café de Flore, a love story which connects a man and woman living in present-day Montreal with a mother and her son in 1960s Paris. The film starred French pop star Vanessa Paradis and Québécois actors Kevin Parent, Hélène Florent, and Evelyne Brochu. It received generally positive reviews from Canadian film critics and garnered 13 nominations at the 32nd Genie Awards. American reviews were more mixed; Variety's Boyd van Hoeij saluted the film's casting, but deemed Café de Flore unoriginal, noting that "Vallée has taken what made C.R.A.Z.Y so successful, and simply tried to replicate it on a slightly larger scale. [Occasionally] similarities between the films... are so striking it almost feels like Vallée's ripping himself off".

==== Dallas Buyers Club (2013) ====
Vallée's next film, Dallas Buyers Club, starred Matthew McConaughey, Jared Leto, and Jennifer Garner. The film is based on the true-life tale of Ron Woodroof, an electrician in Texas diagnosed with AIDS and given 30 days to live, who began smuggling alternative medicine and not-yet-approved drugs into the United States to help himself and other AIDS patients. The film was released in 2013 to critical acclaim, earning Matthew McConaughey the Golden Globe Award for Best Actor and Jared Leto a Golden Globe Award for Best Supporting Actor. The film was nominated for six Academy Awards, including Best Picture and Best Original Screenplay, and won the awards for Best Actor for McConaughey, and Best Supporting Actor for Leto. Vallée also received a nomination for the Academy Award for Best Film Editing under his alias, John Mac McMurphy.

==== Wild (2014) ====
Vallée's film Wild, starring Reese Witherspoon, premiered on August 29, 2014, at the Telluride Film Festival, and was also featured at the Toronto International Film Festival on September 8 and the San Diego Film Festival on September 24. It was released in North America on December 5, 2014. The film was nominated for two Academy Awards, Best Actress for Reese Witherspoon, and Best Supporting Actress for Laura Dern.

In May 2015, Vallée received the National Arts Centre Award, a companion award of the Governor General's Performing Arts Awards, given to an artist in recognition of work of an extraordinary nature over the previous performance year.

==== Demolition (2015) ====
Vallée's next film, Demolition (2015), starred Jake Gyllenhaal and Naomi Watts, and opened the Toronto International Film Festival in September 2015.

=== 2017–2019: HBO limited series ===
==== Big Little Lies (2017–2019) ====
In 2017, he directed and executive-produced the acclaimed HBO miniseries Big Little Lies, winning a Primetime Emmy Award for Outstanding Directing for a Limited Series, Movie, or Dramatic Special.

==== Sharp Objects (2018) ====
Vallée also directed and executive-produced all the episodes of Sharp Objects for HBO in 2018. The series was based on the novel by Gillian Flynn. In April 2021, he and Nathan Ross via Crazyrose signed a deal with HBO and HBO Max.

=== Unfinished projects ===
In 2018, Vallée was set to direct the HBO miniseries Gorilla and the Bird.

Prior to his death, Vallée finished writing the script for what frequent collaborator Martin Pinsonnault said "could have been his biggest" film. The project was a drama about the love story between John Lennon and Yoko Ono, for Universal Pictures. Ono herself reached out to Vallée, wanting him to direct the film after seeing Café de Flore. He officially signed on in late 2018, and developed the script over the next two years while doing reams of research and adopting "a very serious writing schedule every day."

== Personal life and death ==
Vallée was married to Chantal Cadieux, a screenwriter, from 1990 until their divorce in 2006. They had two sons, Alex and Émile. Vallée was made an Officer of the Order of Canada (OC) in 2017, and an officer in the National Order of Quebec (OQ) in 2020. His son with Cadieux, Émile, played the part of Young Zachary in his 2005 film, C.R.A.Z.Y.

On December 25, 2021, Vallée died at the age of 58 from a cardiac arrhythmia secondary to severe atherosclerosis. He was found at his chalet in Berthier-sur-Mer in Quebec. (Note: Vallée's family released a statement on December 31 stating he died on December 25. Earlier reports on his death had been split between December 25 and 26, with Vallée's publicist giving a December 26 date of death to CNN and The Washington Post. Additionally, the preliminary coroner report did not determine an exact cause of death, despite reports from his representatives suggesting it was a suspected heart attack. His cause of death being arrhythmia would be revealed on April 13, 2022.)

Following his death, the Directors Guild of Canada renamed its DGC Discovery Award for emerging filmmakers to the Jean-Marc Vallée DGC Discovery Award in his memory, and filmmaker Marie-Julie Dallaire announced the production of Cut Print Thank You Bye, a documentary film about Vallée's life and career. The Apple TV+ series Lady in the Lake, which Vallée had intended on directing, was dedicated to his memory. He is posthumously credited as one of the executive producers.

== Filmography ==
=== Short films ===
Year	Title	Director	Writer	Executive Producer	Editor
1991	Stereotypes (Stéréotypes)	Yes	No	No	Yes
1995	Magical Flowers (Les Fleurs magiques)	Yes	Yes	No	Yes
1998	Magical Words (Les Mots magiques)	Yes	Yes	No	No
2012	Little Pig	No	No	Yes	No

=== Feature films ===
Year	Title	Director	Writer	Producer	Editor
1995	Black List	Yes	No	No	Yes
1997	Los Locos	Yes	No	No	Yes
1999	Loser Love	Yes	No	No	Yes
2005	C.R.A.Z.Y.	Yes	Yes	Yes	No
2009	The Young Victoria	Yes	No	No	No
2011	Café de Flore	Yes	Yes	Yes	Yes
2013	Dallas Buyers Club	Yes	No	No	Yes
2014	Wild	Yes	No	No	Yes
2015	Demolition	Yes	No	Yes	Yes

=== Television ===
Year	Title	Director	Executive Producer	Editor	Notes
2017–2019	Big Little Lies	Season 1	Yes	Yes	2 seasons
2018	Sharp Objects	Yes	Yes	Yes	8 episodes
2024	Lady in the Lake	No	Yes	No	Posthumous release

== Awards and nominations ==
Awards and nominations received by Vallée's films
Year	Title	Academy Awards		BAFTA Awards		Golden Globe Awards	
Year	Title	Nominations	Wins	Nominations	Wins	Nominations	Wins
2009	The Young Victoria	3	1	2	2	1	
2013	Dallas Buyers Club	6	3			2	2
2014	Wild	2		1		1	
Total		11	4	3	2	4	2

=== Academy Awards ===
Year	Category	Title	Result
2013	Best Film Editing	Dallas Buyers Club	Nominated

Directed Academy Award performances
Under Vallée's direction, these actors have received Academy Award wins and nominations for their performances in their respective roles.

Year	Performer	Film	Result
Academy Award for Best Actor
2013	Matthew McConaughey	Dallas Buyers Club	Won
Academy Award for Best Actress
2014	Reese Witherspoon	Wild	Nominated
Academy Award for Best Supporting Actor
2013	Jared Leto	Dallas Buyers Club	Won
Academy Award for Best Supporting Actress
2014	Laura Dern	Wild	Nominated

=== Genie Awards ===
Year	Category	Title	Result
1993	Best Live Action Short Drama	Stereotypes	Nominated
1996	Best Director	Black List	Nominated
1996	Best Editing	Black List	Nominated
2006	Best Motion Picture	C.R.A.Z.Y.	Won
2006	Best Director	C.R.A.Z.Y.	Won
2006	Best Original Screenplay	C.R.A.Z.Y.	Won
2012	Best Motion Picture	Café de Flore	Nominated
2012	Best Director	Café de Flore	Nominated
2012	Best Original Screenplay	Café de Flore	Nominated

=== Jutra Awards ===
Year	Category	Title	Result
1999	Best Live Action Short Film	Magical Words	Won
2006	Best Film	C.R.A.Z.Y.	Won
2006	Best Director	C.R.A.Z.Y.	Won
2006	Best Screenplay	C.R.A.Z.Y.	Won
2006	Billet d'or	C.R.A.Z.Y.	Won
2006	Most Successful Film Outside Quebec	C.R.A.Z.Y.	Won
2007	Most Successful Film Outside Quebec	C.R.A.Z.Y.	Won
2012	Best Director	Café de Flore	Nominated
2012	Most Successful Film Outside Quebec	Café de Flore	Nominated

=== Primetime Emmy Awards ===
Year	Category	Work	Result
2017	Outstanding Limited Series	Big Little Lies	Won
2017	Outstanding Directing for a Limited Series	Big Little Lies	Won
2017	Outstanding Picture Editing for a Limited Series	Big Little Lies	Nominated
2019	Outstanding Limited Series	Sharp Objects	Nominated
2019	Outstanding Picture Editing for a Limited Series	Sharp Objects	Nominated
