= Charles Binamé =

Canadian director

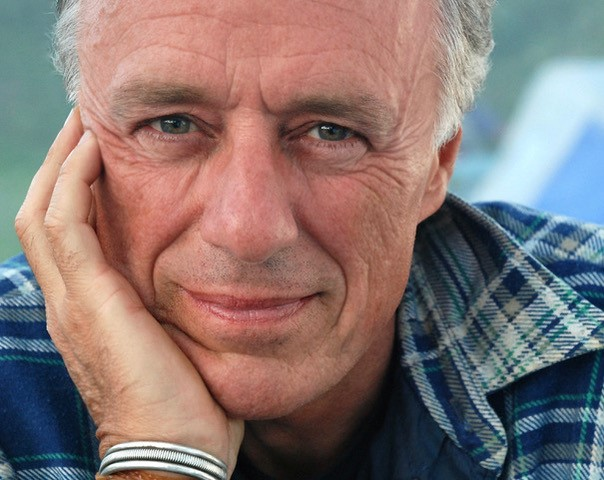
- Born: May 25, 1949 (age 77); Herve, Belgium
- Occupations: Film director Screenwriter
- Years active: 1974 - Present

Charles Binamé CQ (French pronunciation: [ʃaʁl biname]; born May 25, 1949) is a Quebec director. He was born in Belgium and came to Montreal with his family at a young age. He joined the National Film Board of Canada as an assistant director in 1971, but soon left for the private sector. During the 1970s, he mostly directed documentaries for Quebec television, and in the 1980s he directed over 200 television commercials, including some in England. When he returned to Canada in the early 1990s, he directed two of Quebec's most popular television series of all time, Blanche (the sequel to the series Les Filles de Caleb) and Marguerite Volant. The former won him seven Prix Gémeaux and the FIPA d'Or at Cannes Film Festival for best drama series. Also in the 1990s Binamé wrote and directed a trio of edgy urban dramas – Eldorado, Streetheart (Le Coeur au poing) and Pandora's Beauty (La Beauté de Pandore). His big-budget Séraphin: Heart of Stone (a remake of Un Homme et son péché) was a huge box-office hit in Quebec in 2002, and in 2005 he directed The Rocket, a biography of hockey legend Maurice Richard, which earned him a Genie Award for best director.

== Television ==
- Blanche (1993 series)
- Marguerite Volant (1996 mini-series)
- Hunt for Justice (2004)
- H_{2}O (2004 mini-series)
- The Trojan Horse (2008 mini-series, sequel to H_{2}O)
- Durham County (2010, three episodes)
- Reign (TV series)

== Filmography ==
- Un autre homme - 1990
- Chili's Blues (C'était le 12 du 12, et Chili avait les blues) - 1994
- Eldorado - 1995
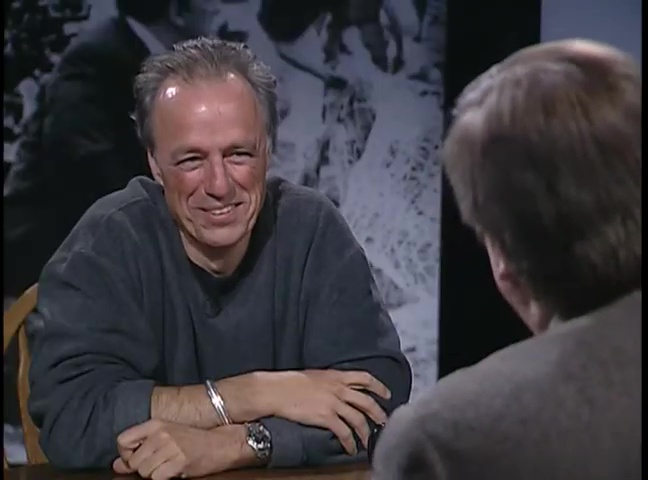
- Binamé discusses Le Coeur Au Poing on CUNY TV's City Cinematheque, 2000
  Streetheart (Le Coeur au poing) - 1998
- Pandora's Beauty (La Beauté de Pandore) - 2000
- Séraphin: Heart of Stone (Séraphin: Un homme et son péché) - 2002
- The Rocket (Maurice Richard) - 2005
- Gilles Carle: The Untamable Mind (Gilles Carle ou l'indomptable imaginaire) - 2005
- The American Trap (Le piège américain) - 2008
- Cyberbully - 2011
- Elephant Song - 2014

== Awards and recognition ==
- 2007: Genie Award for Best Direction,
- 2020: Knight, National Order of Quebec
