= List of Academy Award winners and nominees from Canada =

This is a list of Canadian Academy Award winners and nominees. This list details the performances of Canadian filmmakers, actors, actresses and films that have either been submitted, nominated or have won an Academy Award.

== Best Actor in a Leading Role ==
Best Actor in a Leading Role
Year	Name	Film	Status	Milestone / Notes
1936	Walter Huston	Dodsworth	Nominated	First Canadian actor to receive a nomination for Best Actor.
1940	Raymond Massey	Abe Lincoln in Illinois	Nominated	
1941	Walter Huston	The Devil and Daniel Webster	Nominated	
1942	Walter Pidgeon	Mrs. Miniver	Nominated	
1943	Walter Pidgeon	Madame Curie	Nominated	
1944	Alexander Knox	Wilson	Nominated	
2006	Ryan Gosling	Half Nelson	Nominated	
2016	Ryan Gosling	La La Land	Nominated	
2022	Brendan Fraser	The Whale	Won	Fraser is an American-born Canadian actor.

== Best Actress in a Leading Role ==
Best Actress in a Leading Role
Year	Name	Film	Status	Milestone / Notes
1928–29	Mary Pickford	Coquette	Won	First Canadian to win an Oscar. First Canadian actress to win an Oscar. First Canadian to receive an Oscar nomination. First Canadian actress to receive a nomination for Best Actress. Inaugural win.
1929–30	Norma Shearer	The Divorcee	Won	First Canadian to receive multiple nominations.
1929–30	Norma Shearer	Their Own Desire	Nominated	First Canadian to receive multiple nominations.
1930–31	Marie Dressler	Min and Bill	Won	First time multiple Canadians received Oscar nominations. First time multiple Canadians received nominations in the same category.
1930–31	Norma Shearer	A Free Soul	Nominated	First time multiple Canadians received Oscar nominations. First time multiple Canadians received nominations in the same category.
1931–32	Marie Dressler	Emma	Nominated	
1934	Norma Shearer	The Barretts of Wimpole Street	Nominated	
1936	Norma Shearer	Romeo and Juliet	Nominated	
1938	Norma Shearer	Marie Antoinette	Nominated	
1969	Geneviève Bujold	Anne of the Thousand Days	Nominated	
2007	Elliot Page	Juno	Nominated	Page was nominated prior to his gender transition in 2020. At age 20, it made him the fourth-youngest Best Actress nominee at the time.
2016	Brie Larson	Room	Won	Larson is an American-born Canadian actress.

== Best Actor in a Supporting Role ==
Best Actor in a Supporting Role
Year	Name	Film	Status	Milestone / Notes
1938	Gene Lockhart	Algiers	Nominated	Lockhart was a Canadian-American character actor, singer, and playwright.
1942	Walter Huston	Yankee Doodle Dandy	Nominated	First Canadian actor to be nominated in multiple categories.
1944	Hume Cronyn	The Seventh Cross	Nominated	
1946	Harold Russell	The Best Years of Our Lives	Won	Russell was a Canadian born, U.S. veteran. First Canadian actor to win an Oscar. First Canadian actor to win an Oscar for Supporting Actor.
1948	Walter Huston	The Treasure of the Sierra Madre	Won	
1949	John Ireland	All the King's Men	Nominated	Ireland was born in Canada, but raised in the United States.
1960	Jack Kruschen	The Apartment	Nominated	
1970	Chief Dan George	Little Big Man	Nominated	First First Nations actor to receive a nomination.
1989	Dan Aykroyd	Driving Miss Daisy	Nominated	
1990	Graham Greene	Dances with Wolves	Nominated	Second First Nations actor to receive a nomination.
2009	Christopher Plummer	The Last Station	Nominated	
2011	Christopher Plummer	Beginners	Won	Oldest Canadian actor to win an Oscar for Supporting Actor (age 82).
2017	Christopher Plummer	All the Money in the World	Nominated	Oldest Canadian actor to receive a nomination (age 88).
2023	Ryan Gosling	Barbie	Nominated	

== Best Actress in a Supporting Role ==
Best Actress in a Supporting Role
Year	Name	Film	Status	Milestone / Notes
1943	Lucile Watson	Watch on the Rhine	Nominated	First Canadian actress to be nominated for Supporting Actress.
1985	Meg Tilly	Agnes of God	Nominated	Tilly is an American-born Canadian actress.
1991	Kate Nelligan	The Prince of Tides	Nominated	
1993	Anna Paquin	The Piano	Won	Paquin is a Canadian actress with a New Zealand citizenship. Youngest Canadian to win an acting Oscar (age 11). Second-youngest winner in Oscar history.
1994	Jennifer Tilly	Bullets over Broadway	Nominated	Tilly is an American born-Canadian actress.
2015	Rachel McAdams	Spotlight	Nominated	

== Best Animated Feature ==
Best Animated Feature
Year	Name	Film	Status	Milestone / Notes
2003	Robert Walker	Brother Bear	Nominated	Shared with Aaron Blaise.
2010	Dean DeBlois	How to Train Your Dragon	Nominated	Shared with Chris Sanders.
2014
2014	Chris Williams	Big Hero 6	Won	Shared with Don Hall and Roy Conli
2014	Dean DeBlois	How to Train Your Dragon 2	Nominated	Shared with Bonnie Arnold.
2014	Graham Annable	The Boxtrolls	Nominated	Shared with Anthony Stacchi and Travis Knight.
2017	Anthony Leo	The Breadwinner	Nominated	Shared with Nora Twomey.
2018	Jeremy Dawson	Isle of Dogs	Nominated	Shared with Wes Anderson, Scott Rudin and Steven Rales.
2019	Dean DeBlois	How to Train Your Dragon: The Hidden World	Nominated	Shared with Bradford Lewis and Bonnie Arnold.
2022	Domee Shi	Turning Red	Nominated	Shared with Lindsey Collins
2022	Chris Williams	The Sea Beast	Nominated	Shared with Jed Schlanger
2025	Domee Shi	Elio	Nominated	Shared with Madeline Sharafian, Adrian Molina, and Mary Alice Drumm
2025	Maggie Kang	KPop Demon Hunters	Won	Shared with Chris Appelhans,and Michelle Wong

== Best Animated Short Film ==
Best Animated Short Film
Year	Name	Film	Status	Milestone / Notes
1949	Stephen Bosustow	The Magic Fluke	Nominated	Bosustow was a Canadian-born American film producer.
1950	Stephen Bosustow	Trouble Indemnity	Nominated	
1950	Stephen Bosustow	Gerald McBoing-Boing	Won	
1951	Stephen Bosustow	Rooty Toot Toot	Nominated	
1952	Stephen Bosustow	Madeline	Nominated	
1952	Stephen Bosustow	Pink and Blue Blues	Nominated	
1952	Tom Daly	The Romance of Transportation in Canada	Nominated	First Canadian film nominated in the category.
1953	Stephen Bosustow	Christopher Crumpet	Nominated	
1953	Stephen Bosustow	The Tell-Tale Heart	Nominated	
1954	Stephen Bosustow	When Magoo Flew	Won	
1956	Stephen Bosustow	Magoo's Puddle Jumper	Won	
1956	Stephen Bosustow	Gerald McBoing-Boing on Planet Moo	Nominated	
1956	Stephen Bosustow	The Jaywalker	Nominated	
1957	Stephen Bosustow	Trees and Jamaica Daddy	Nominated	
1963	Gerald Potterton; Tom Daly; Colin Low	My Financial Career	Nominated	Potterton is a British–Canadian.
1964	National Film Board of Canada	Christmas Cracker	Nominated	
1966	Robert Verrall; Wolf Koenig	The Drag	Nominated	Koenig was a German-born Canadian.
1967	Robert Verrall; Wolf Koenig	What on Earth	Nominated	
1968	Wolf Koenig; Jim Mackay	The House That Jack Built	Nominated	
1969	Ryan Larkin	Walking	Nominated	
1971	Michael Mills	Evolution	Nominated	Mills is a British-born Canadian producer and director of short films.
1971	Murray Shostak	The Selfish Giant	Nominated	Shared with Peter Sander.
1972	Richard Williams	A Christmas Carol	Won	Williams is a Canadian–British.
1974	René Jodoin	Hunger	Nominated	Shared with Peter Foldes.
1975	Bernard Longpré; André Leduc	Monsieur Pointu	Nominated	
1976	Caroline Leaf; Guy Glover	The Street	Nominated	Leaf is a Canadian-American filmmaker and animator.
1977	Ishu Patel	Bead Game	Nominated	Patel is an Indian-born Canadian film director and animator.
1977	Co Hoedeman	The Sand Castle	Won	Hoedeman is a Dutch-Canadian filmmaker.
1978	John Weldon	Special Delivery	Won	Shared with Eunice Macauley.
1980	Michael Mills	History of the World in Three Minutes Flat	Nominated	
1980	Frédéric Back	All Nothing	Nominated	Back is a French-born Canadian producer and director of short films.
1981	Frédéric Back	Crac	Won	
1981	Janet Perlman	The Tender Tale of Cinderella Penguin	Nominated	
1984	Jon Minnis	Charade	Won	Minnis is a Canadian animator and scriptwriter of British origin.
1984	Ishu Patel	Paradise	Nominated	
1985	Richard Condie	The Big Snit	Nominated	Shared with Michael Scott.
1986	Bill Reeves	Luxo Jr.	Nominated	Shared with John Lasseter.
1987	Frédéric Back	The Man Who Planted Trees	Won	
1988	Bill Reeves	Tin Toy	Won	Shared with John Lasseter.
1988	Cordell Barker	The Cat Came Back	Nominated	
1991	Wendy Tilby	Strings	Nominated	
1991	Christopher Hinton	Blackfly	Nominated	
1993	Frédéric Back; Hubert Tison	The Mighty River	Nominated	
1994	David Fine	Bob's Birthday	Won	Shared with Alison Snowden.
1996	Richard Condie	La Salla	Nominated	
1999	Wendy Tilby; Amanda Forbis	When the Day Breaks	Nominated	
1999	Torill Kove	My Grandmother Ironed the King's Shirts	Nominated	Kove is a Norwegian-born Canadian film director and animator.
2001	Cordell Barker	Strange Invaders	Nominated	
2002	Eric Armstrong	The ChubbChubbs!	Won	
2003	Christopher Hinton	Nibbles	Nominated	
2006	Torill Kove	The Danish Poet	Won	
2006	Mike Thurmeier	No Time for Nuts	Nominated	Shared with Chris Renaud
2007	Chris Lavis; Maciek Szczerbowski	Madame Tutli-Putli	Nominated	Szczerbowski is a Polish-born Canadian animator.
2007	Josh Raskin	I Met the Walrus	Nominated	
2011	Wendy Tilby; Amanda Forbis	Wild Life	Nominated	
2011	Patrick Doyon	Sunday (Dimanche)	Nominated	
2014	Torill Kove	Me and My Moulton	Nominated	
2015	Richard Williams; Imogen Sutton	Prologue	Nominated	Both Williams and Sutton are Canadian–British.
2016	Alan Barillaro	Piper	Won	Shared with Marc Sondheimer.
2016	Theodore Ushev	Blind Vaysha	Nominated	
2016	Robert Valley	Pear Cider and Cigarettes	Nominated	Shared with Cara Speller.
2018	David Fine	Animal Behaviour	Nominated	Shared with Alison Snowden.
2018	Trevor Jimenez	Weekends	Nominated	
2018	Domee Shi	Bao	Won	Shi is a Chinese-born Canadian.
2022	Wendy Tilby; Amanda Forbis	The Flying Sailor	Nominated	
2025	Chris Lavis; Maciek Szczerbowski	The Girl Who Cried Pearls	Won	

== Best Cinematography ==
Best Cinematography
Year	Name	Film	Status	Milestone / Notes
1939	Osmond Borradaile	The Four Feathers	Nominated	Shared with Georges Périnal.

== Best Costume Design ==
Best Costume Design
Year	Name	Film	Status	Milestone / Notes
2009	Monique Prudhomme	The Imaginarium of Doctor Parnassus	Nominated	
2017	Luis Sequeira	The Shape of Water	Nominated	Sequeira is a Canadian costume designer of Portuguese descent.
2021	Luis Sequeira	Nightmare Alley	Nominated	Sequeira is a Canadian costume designer of Portuguese descent.
2024	Linda Muir	Nosferatu	Nominated	

== Best Director ==
Best Director
Year	Name	Film	Status	Milestone / Notes
1947	Edward Dmytryk	Crossfire	Nominated	First Canadian to be nominated for Best Director.
1957	Mark Robson	Peyton Place	Nominated	
1958	Mark Robson	The Inn of the Sixth Happiness	Nominated	First Canadian director to receive multiple nominations.
1967	Norman Jewison	In the Heat of the Night	Nominated	
1970	Arthur Hiller	Love Story	Nominated	
1971	Norman Jewison	Fiddler on the Roof	Nominated	
1987	Norman Jewison	Moonstruck	Nominated	
1997	James Cameron	Titanic	Won	First Canadian to win Best Director.
1997	Atom Egoyan	The Sweet Hereafter	Nominated	Egoyan is an Egyptian-born Canadian filmmaker.
2005	Paul Haggis	Crash	Nominated	
2007	Jason Reitman	Juno	Nominated	
2009	Jason Reitman	Up in the Air	Nominated	
2009	James Cameron	Avatar	Nominated	
2016	Denis Villeneuve	Arrival	Nominated	

== Best Documentary Feature ==
Best Documentary Feature
Year	Name	Film	Status	Milestone / Notes
1954	Guy Glover	The Stratford Adventure	Nominated	
1966	Tom Daly	Helicopter Canada	Nominated	Shared with Peter Jones.
1975	F. R. Crawley	The Man Who Skied Down Everest	Won	Shared with James Hager and Dale Hartleben.
1976	Donald Brittain	Volcano: An Inquiry into the Life and Death of Malcolm Lowry	Nominated	Shared with Robert A. Duncan.
1977	Tony Ianzelo	High Grass Circus	Nominated	Shared with Bill Brind and Torben Schioler.
1977	Harry Rasky	Homage to Chagall: The Colours of Love	Nominated	
1979	Paul Cowan	Going the Distance	Nominated	Shared with Jacques Bobet.
1982	John Zaritsky	Just Another Missing Kid	Won	
1987	Brigitte Berman	Artie Shaw: Time Is All You've Got	Won	
1992	Roma Baran	Music for the Movies: Bernard Herrmann	Nominated	Shared with Margaret Smilow.
2002	Michael Donovan	Bowling for Columbine	Won	Shared with Michael Moore.
2016	Howard Barish	13th	Nominated	Shared with Ava DuVernay and Spencer Averick.
2022	Daniel Roher; Odessa Rae	Navalny	Won	Shared with Diane Becker, Melanie Miller and Shane Boris.
2022	Ina Fichman	Fire of Love	Nominated	Shared with Sara Dosa and Shane Boris.
2023	Nisha Pahuja; Cornelia Principe; David Oppenheim	To Kill a Tiger	Nominated	

== Best Documentary Short Film ==
Best Documentary Short Film
Year	Name	Film	Status	Milestone / Notes
1941	National Film Board of Canada	Churchill's Island	Won	First Canadian film to win an Oscar. First film to win Best Documentary (Short Subject).
1941	National Film Board of Canada	Warclouds in the Pacific	Nominated	
1942	National Film Board of Canada	Inside Fighting China	Nominated	In 1942, documentary features and short subjects competed together for Best Documentary.
1942	National Film Board of Canada	High over the Borders	Nominated	In 1942, documentary features and short subjects competed together for Best Documentary.
1949	National Film Board of Canada	The Rising Tide	Nominated	
1950	National Film Board of Canada	The Fight: Science Against Cancer	Nominated	
1952	Stephen Bosustow	Man Alive!	Nominated	
1952	Norman McLaren	Neighbours	Won	
1958	Tom Daly	The Living Stone	Nominated	
1960	Colin Low	Universe	Nominated	
1976	Tony Ianzelo	Blackwood	Nominated	Shared with Andy Thomson.
1982	Terre Nash	If You Love This Planet	Won	Shared with Edward Le Lorrain.
1983	Cynthia Scott	Flamenco at 5:15	Won	Shared with Adam Symansky.
2006	Hubert Davis	Hardwood	Nominated	
2020	Sami Khan	St. Louis Superman	Nominated	Shared with Smriti Mundhra.
2021	Ben Proudfoot	A Concerto Is a Conversation	Nominated	Shared with Kris Bowers.
2022	Ben Proudfoot	The Queen of Basketball	Won	First win for New York Times Op-Docs
2023	Ben Proudfoot	The Last Repair Shop	Won	Shared with Kris Bowers.
2025	Alison McAlpine	Perfectly a Strangeness	Nominated	

== Best Film Editing ==
Best Editing
Year	Name	Film	Status	Milestone / Notes
1947	Harmon Jones	Gentleman's Agreement	Nominated	
1950	Ralph E. Winters	King Solomon's Mines	Won	Shared with Conrad A. Nervig.
1951	Ralph E. Winters	Quo Vadis	Nominated	
1954	Ralph E. Winters	Seven Brides for Seven Brothers	Nominated	
1959	Ralph E. Winters	Ben-Hur	Won	Shared with John Dunning.
1960	Robert Lawrence	Spartacus	Nominated	
1965	Ralph E. Winters	The Great Race	Nominated	
1971	Ralph E. Winters	Kotch	Nominated	
1983	Douglas Stewart	The Right Stuff	Won	Shared with Glenn Farr, Lisa Fruchtman, Stephen A. Rotter, and Tom Rolf.
1997	James Cameron	Titanic	Won	Shared with Conrad Buff and Richard A. Harris.
2009	James Cameron	Avatar	Nominated	Shared with John Refoua and Stephen E. Rivkin.
2009	Julian Clarke	District 9	Nominated	
2013	Jean-Marc Vallée; Martin Pensa	Dallas Buyers Club	Nominated	
2017	Sidney Wolinsky	The Shape of Water	Nominated	

== Best International Feature Film ==
Best International Feature
Year	Film	Director	Status	Milestone / Notes
1986	The Decline of the American Empire	Denys Arcand	Nominated	(original title: Le Déclin de l'empire américain). First Canadian film to be nominated for Best Foreign Language Film.
1989	Jesus of Montreal	Denys Arcand	Nominated	(original title: Jésus de Montréal).
2003	The Barbarian Invasions	Denys Arcand	Won	(original title: Les Invasions barbares). First Canadian film to win Best Foreign Language Film.
2006	Water	Deepa Mehta	Nominated	(original title: Water वाटर). First Canadian film to be nominated for Best Foreign Language Film that is not spoken in French (predominantly in Hindi).
2010	Incendies	Denis Villeneuve	Nominated	
2011	Monsieur Lazhar	Philippe Falardeau	Nominated	
2012	War Witch	Kim Nguyen	Nominated	(original title: Rebelle).

The 2018 nominee Capernaum was directed by a Canadian citizen, Nadine Labaki, but the film represented Lebanon at the Oscars and was in no way a Canadian film.

== Best Live Action Short Film ==
Best Live Action Short
Year	Name	Film	Status	Milestone / Notes
1952	Norman McLaren	Neighbours	Nominated	Nominated for Best Short Subject, One-reel.
1953	National Film Board of Canada	Herring Hunt	Nominated	Nominated for Best Short Subject, One-reel.
1957	Tom Daly	City of Gold	Nominated	
1957	Norman McLaren	A Chairy Tale	Nominated	
1961	National Film Board of Canada	Very Nice, Very Nice	Nominated	
1967	Julian Biggs	Paddle to the Sea	Nominated	
1968	Christopher Chapman	A Place to Stand	Won	Commissioned by the Ontario Department of Economics and Development for Expo 67.
1968	National Film Board of Canada	Pas de deux	Nominated	
1969	Douglas Jackson	Blake	Nominated	
1977	Beverly Shaffer; Yuki Yoshida	I'll Find a Way	Won	Yoshida was a Japanese-born Canadian.
1979	Roman Kroitor	Bravery in the Field	Nominated	
1979	Stefan Wodoslawsky	Bravery in the Field	Nominated	
1982	John N. Smith	First Winter	Nominated	
1984	Michael MacMillan; Janice L. Platt	The Painted Door	Nominated	
1989	Jonathan Tammuz	The Childeater	Nominated	Tammuz is a British-Canadian film director.
2012	Ariel Nasr	Buzkashi Boys	Nominated	Shared with Sam French.
2012	Yan England	Henry	Nominated	
2018	Jérémy Comte	Fauve	Nominated	
2018	Marianne Farley	Marguerite	Nominated	
2019	Meryam Joobeur; Maria Gracia Turgeon	Brotherhood	Nominated	Joobeur is a Tunisian-born Canadian.
2023	Vincent René-Lortie; Samuel Caron	Invincible	Nominated	

== Best Picture ==
Best Picture
Year	Name	Film	Status	Milestone / Notes
1929–30	Jack L. Warner	Disraeli	Nominated	Warner was a Canadian-American film executive. Shared with Darryl F. Zanuck.
1934	Jack L. Warner	Flirtation Walk	Nominated	Shared with Hal B. Wallis and Robert Lord.
1940	Jack L. Warner	All This, and Heaven Too	Nominated	Shared with Hal B. Wallis and David Lewis.
1942	Jack L. Warner	Yankee Doodle Dandy	Nominated	Shared with Hal B. Wallis and William Cagney.
1958	Jack L. Warner	Auntie Mame	Nominated	
1964	Jack L. Warner	My Fair Lady	Won	
1966	Norman Jewison	The Russians Are Coming, the Russians Are Coming	Nominated	
1971	Norman Jewison	Fiddler on the Roof	Nominated	
1972	Albert S. Ruddy	The Godfather	Won	
1981	Denis Héroux; John Kemeny	Atlantic City	Nominated	Kemeny a Hungarian-born Canadian film producer.
1984	Norman Jewison	A Soldier's Story	Nominated	Shared with Ronald L. Schwary and Patrick J. Palmer.
1987	Norman Jewison	Moonstruck	Nominated	Shared with Patrick J. Palmer.
1997	James Cameron	Titanic	Won	Shared with Jon Landau.
2004	Albert S. Ruddy	Million Dollar Baby	Won	Shared with Clint Eastwood and Tom Rosenberg.
2005	Paul Haggis	Crash	Won	Shared with Cathy Schulman.
2005	William Vince	Capote	Nominated	Shared with Caroline Baron and Michael Ohoven.
2009	James Cameron	Avatar	Nominated	Shared with Jon Landau.
2009	Ivan Reitman; Jason Reitman	Up in the Air	Nominated	Shared with Daniel Dubiecki.
2013	Vincent Landay	Her	Nominated	Shared with Megan Ellison and Spike Jonze.
2016	Shawn Levy	Arrival	Nominated	Shared with Dan Levine, Aaron Ryder, and David Linde.
2017	J. Miles Dale	The Shape of Water	Won	Shared with Guillermo del Toro.
2021	J. Miles Dale	Nightmare Alley	Nominated	Shared with Guillermo del Toro and Bradley Cooper.
2021	Roger Frappier	The Power of the Dog	Nominated	Shared with Jane Campion, Tanya Seghatchian, Iain Canning, and Emile Sherman.
2021	Denis Villeneuve	Dune	Nominated	Shared with Mary Parent and Cale Boyter.
2022	James Cameron	Avatar: The Way of Water	Nominated	Shared with Jon Landau.
2024	Samantha Quan	Anora	Won	Shared with Alex Coco and Sean Baker.
2024	Tanya Lapointe; Denis Villeneuve	Dune: Part Two	Nominated	Shared with Mary Parent and Cale Boyter.
2025	J. Miles Dale	Frankenstein	Nominated	Shared with Guillermo del Toro and Scott Stuber.

== Best Makeup and Hairstyling ==
Best Makeup and Hairstyling
Year	Name	Film	Status	Milestone / Notes
1982	Michèle Burke	Quest for Fire	Won	Burke is an Irish naturalized Canadian. Shared with Sarah Monzani.
1984	Paul LeBlanc	Amadeus	Won	Shared with Dick Smith.
1986	Stephan Dupuis	The Fly	Won	Shared with Chris Walas.
1986	Michèle Burke	The Clan of the Cave Bear	Nominated	Shared with Michael Westmore.
1990	Michèle Burke	Cyrano de Bergerac	Nominated	Shared with Jean-Pierre Eychenne.
1992	Michèle Burke	Bram Stoker's Dracula	Won	Shared with Greg Cannom and Matthew W. Mungle.
1999	Michèle Burke	Austin Powers: The Spy Who Shagged Me	Nominated	Shared with Mike Smithson.
2000	Michèle Burke	The Cell	Nominated	Shared with Edouard F. Henriques.
2010	Adrien Morot	Barney's Version	Nominated	
2015	Robert Pandini	The Revenant	Nominated	Shared with Siân Grigg and Duncan Jarman.
2021	Stephanie Ingram	The Eyes of Tammy Faye	Won	Shared with Linda Dowds and Justin Raleigh.
2021	Donald Mowat	Dune	Nominated	Mowat is a Canadian-born British with an American citizenship. Shared with Eva von Bahr and Love Larson.
2022	Adrien Morot	The Whale	Won	Shared with Judy Chin and Anne Marie Bradley
2024	Traci Loader	Nosferatu	Nominated	Shared with David White and Suzanne Stokes-Munton
2025	Jordan Samuel; Cliona Furey	Frankenstein	Won	Shared with Mike Hill

== Best Original Song ==
Best Original Song
Year	Name	Film	Song	Status	Milestone / Notes
1982	Buffy Sainte-Marie	An Officer and a Gentleman	"Up Where We Belong"	Won	American of alleged First Nations descent (since disproven). Once thought to be the first Indigenous person to win an Academy Award. Shared with Jack Nitzsche and Will Jennings.
1986	David Foster	The Karate Kid, Part II	"Glory of Love"	Nominated	Shared with Peter Cetera.
1991	Bryan Adams	Robin Hood: Prince of Thieves	"(Everything I Do) I Do It for You"	Nominated	Shared with Michael Kamen and Mutt Lange.
1992	David Foster	The Bodyguard	"I Have Nothing"	Nominated	Shared with Linda Thompson.
1993	Neil Young	Philadelphia	"Philadelphia"	Nominated	
1995	Bryan Adams	Don Juan DeMarco	"Have You Ever Really Loved a Woman?"	Nominated	Shared with Michael Kamen and Mutt Lange.
1996	Bryan Adams	The Mirror Has Two Faces	"I Finally Found Someone"	Nominated	Shared with Barbra Streisand, Marvin Hamlisch, and Mutt Lange.
1998	David Foster	Quest for Camelot	"The Prayer"	Nominated	Shared with Carole Bayer Sager, Tony Renis, and Alberto Testa.
2003	Benoît Charest	The Triplets of Belleville	"Belleville Rendez-Vous"	Nominated	Shared with Sylvain Chomet.
2003	Howard Shore	The Lord of the Rings: The Return of the King	"Into the West"	Won	Shared with Fran Walsh and Annie Lennox.
2012	Mychael Danna	Life of Pi	"Pi's Lullaby"	Nominated	Shared with Bombay Jayashri.
2015	Belly; DaHeala; Stephan Moccio; The Weeknd	Fifty Shades of Grey	"Earned It"	Nominated	First Black Canadians to be nominated in any category. The Weeknd is the first person of Ethiopian descent to be nominated in any category.

== Best Original Score ==
Best Original Score
Year	Name	Film	Status	Milestone / Notes
1945	Louis Applebaum	The Story of G.I. Joe	Nominated	
1955	Percy Faith	Love Me or Leave Me	Nominated	
2001	Howard Shore	The Lord of the Rings: The Fellowship of the Ring	Won	First Canadian to win two Oscars in this category.
2003	Howard Shore	The Lord of the Rings: The Return of the King	Won	First Canadian to win two Oscars in this category.
2011	Howard Shore	Hugo	Nominated	
2012	Mychael Danna	Life of Pi	Won	
2013	Owen Pallett	Her	Nominated	Shared with Will Butler.
2023	Robbie Robertson	Killers of the Flower Moon	Nominated	Posthumous release

== Best Production Design ==
Best Production Design
Year	Name	Film	Status	Milestone / Notes
1930	Richard Day	Whoopee!	Nominated	
1931	Richard Day	Arrowsmith	Nominated	
1934	Richard Day	The Affairs of Cellini	Nominated	
1935	Richard Day	The Dark Angel	Won	
1936	Richard Day	Dodsworth	Won	
1937	Richard Day	Dead End	Nominated	
1938	Richard Day	The Goldwyn Follies	Nominated	
1940	Richard Day	Down Argentine Way	Nominated	Shared with Joseph C. Wright.
1940	Richard Day	Lillian Russell	Nominated	Shared with Joseph C. Wright.
1941	Richard Day	Blood and Sand	Nominated	Shared with Joseph C. Wright and Thomas Little.
1941	Richard Day	How Green Was My Valley	Won	Shared with Nathan Juran and Thomas Little.
1941	Edward G. Boyle	The Son of Monte Cristo	Nominated	Shared with John DuCasse Schulze.
1942	Richard Day	My Gal Sal	Won	Shared with Joseph C. Wright and Thomas Little.
1942	Richard Day	This Above All	Won	Shared with Joseph C. Wright and Thomas Little.
1946	Richard Day	The Razor's Edge	Nominated	Shared with Nathan Juran, Thomas Little, and Paul S. Fox.
1948	Richard Day	Joan of Arc	Nominated	Shared with Casey Roberts and Joseph Kish.
1951	Richard Day	A Streetcar Named Desire	Won	Shared with George James Hopkins.
1952	Richard Day	Hans Christian Andersen	Nominated	Shared with Antoni Clave and Howard Bristol.
1952	Charles S. Thompson	The Quiet Man	Nominated	Shared with Frank Hotaling and John McCarthy, Jr.
1954	Richard Day	On the Waterfront	Won	
1959	Edward G. Boyle	Some Like It Hot	Nominated	Shared with Ted Haworth.
1960	Edward G. Boyle	The Apartment	Won	Shared with Alexandre Trauner.
1961	Edward G. Boyle	The Children's Hour	Nominated	Shared with Fernando Carrere.
1964	Edward G. Boyle	Seven Days in May	Nominated	Shared with Cary Odell.
1965	Charles S. Thompson	A Patch of Blue	Nominated	Shared with George Davis, Urie McCleary, and Henry Grace.
1965	Richard Day	The Greatest Story Ever Told	Nominated	Shared with William J. Creber, David S. Hall, Ray Moyer, Fred M. MacLean, and Norman Rockett.
1966	Edward G. Boyle	The Fortune Cookie	Nominated	Shared with Robert Luthardt
1969	Edward G. Boyle; Carl Biddiscombe	Gaily, Gaily	Nominated	Shared with Robert F. Boyle and George B. Chan.
1970	Richard Day; Carl Biddiscombe	Tora! Tora! Tora!	Nominated	Shared with Jack Martin Smith, Yoshirô Muraki, Taizô Kawashima, Walter M. Scott, and Norman Rockett.
1991	Dennis Gassner	Bugsy	Won	Gassner is a Canadian-American production designer. Shared with Nancy Haigh.
1991	Dennis Gassner	Barton Fink	Nominated	Gassner is a Canadian-American production designer. Shared with Nancy Haigh.
1992	Janice Blackie-Goodine	Unforgiven	Nominated	Shared with Henry Bumstead.
2002	Gordon Sim	Chicago	Won	Shared with John Myhre.
2002	Dennis Gassner	Road to Perdition	Nominated	Shared with Nancy Haigh.
2007	Dennis Gassner	The Golden Compass	Nominated	Shared with Anna Pinnock.
2007	Jim Erickson	There Will Be Blood	Nominated	Shared with Jack Fisk.
2008	Peter Lando	The Dark Knight	Nominated	Shared with Nathan Crowley.
2009	Anastasia Masaro	The Imaginarium of Doctor Parnassus	Nominated	Shared with Dave Warren and Caroline Smith.
2009	Gordon Sim	Nine	Nominated	Shared with John Myhre.
2009	Patrice Vermette	The Young Victoria	Nominated	Shared with Maggie Gray.
2012	Jim Erickson	Lincoln	Won	Shared with Rick Carter.
2014	Dennis Gassner	Into the Woods	Nominated	Shared with Anna Pinnock.
2015	Hamish Purdy	The Revenant	Nominated	Shared with Jack Fisk.
2016	Patrice Vermette; Paul Hotte	Arrival	Nominated	
2017	Dennis Gassner	Blade Runner 2049	Nominated	Shared with Alessandra Querzola.
2017	Paul Denham Austerberry; Shane Vieau; Jeff Melvin	The Shape of Water	Won	Austerberry is a Canadian production designer of English/Filipino descent.
2018	Gordon Sim	Mary Poppins Returns	Nominated	Shared with John Myhre.
2019	Dennis Gassner	1917	Nominated	Shared with Lee Sandales.
2021	Patrice Vermette	Dune	Won	Shared with Zsuzsanna Sipos.
2021	Tamara Deverell; Shane Vieau	Nightmare Alley	Nominated	
2024	Patricia Cuccia	The Brutalist	Nominated	Shared with Judy Becker
2024	Patrice Vermette; Shane Vieau	Dune: Part Two	Nominated	
2025	Tamara Deverell; Shane Vieau	Frankenstein	Won	

== Best Sound ==
Best Sound (Note: This category is currently known as Best Sound, but has various name changes and split into two separate categories for a period of time. See the Best Sound page for more details)
Year	Name	Film	Status	Milestone / Notes
Best Sound Recording
1929	Douglas Shearer	The Big House	Won	
1934	Douglas Shearer	Viva Villa	Nominated	
1935	Douglas Shearer	Naughty Marietta	Won	
1936	Douglas Shearer	San Francisco	Won	
1937	Douglas Shearer	Maytime	Nominated	
1938	Douglas Shearer	Sweethearts	Nominated	
1939	Douglas Shearer	Balalaika	Nominated	
1940	Douglas Shearer	Strike Up the Band	Won	
1941	Douglas Shearer	The Chocolate Soldier	Nominated	
1942	Douglas Shearer	Mrs. Miniver	Nominated	
1943	Douglas Shearer	Madame Curie	Nominated	
1944	Douglas Shearer	Kismet	Nominated	
1945	Douglas Shearer	They Were Expendable	Nominated	
1947	Douglas Shearer	Green Dolphin Street	Nominated	
1951	Douglas Shearer	The Great Caruso	Won	
Best Sound
1992	Rob Young	Unforgiven	Nominated	Shared with Les Fresholtz, Vern Poore, and Rick Alexander.
Best Sound Mixing
2007	Craig Berkey	No Country for Old Men	Nominated	Shared with Skip Lievsay, Greg Orloff, and Peter Kurland.
2010	Craig Berkey	True Grit	Nominated	Shared with Skip Lievsay, Greg Orloff, and Peter Kurland.
Best Sound Editing
2010	Craig Berkey	True Grit	Nominated	Shared with Skip Lievsay.
Best Sound Mixing
2013	Andy Koyama	Lone Survivor	Nominated	Shared with Beau Borders and David Brownlow.
2014	Craig Mann	Whiplash	Won	Shared with Ben Wilkins and Thomas Curley.
2015	Chris Duesterdiek	The Revenant	Nominated	Shared with Jon Taylor, Frank A. Montaño, and Randy Thom.
2016	Bernard Gariépy Strobl; Claude La Haye	Arrival	Nominated	
Best Sound Editing
2016	Sylvain Bellemare	Arrival	Won	
2017	Nathan Robitaille; Nelson Ferreira	The Shape of Water	Nominated	
Best Sound Mixing
2017	Christian Cooke; Brad Zoern; Glen Gauthier	The Shape of Water	Nominated	
2018	Paul Massey	Bohemian Rhapsody	Won	Massey is an English-Canadian. Shared with Tim Cavagin and John Casali.
2018	Craig Henighan	Roma	Nominated	Shared with Skip Livesay and Jose Antonio Garcia.
Best Sound
2021	Paul Massey	No Time to Die	Nominated	Shared with Simon Hayes, Oliver Tarney, James Harrison, and Mark Taylor.
2024	David Giammarco; Paul Massey	A Complete Unknown	Nominated	Shared with Tod A. Maitland, Donald Sylvester, and Ted Caplan

== Best Visual Effects ==
Best Visual Effects
Year	Name	Film	Status	Milestone / Notes
Best Special Effects (Note: From 1939 until 1962, visual effects and sound effects artists competed in a combined Best Special Effects category.)
1939	Douglas Shearer	The Wizard of Oz	Nominated	Shared with A. Arnold Gillespie.
1940	Douglas Shearer	Boom Town	Nominated	Shared with A. Arnold Gillespie.
1941	Douglas Shearer	Flight Command	Nominated	Shared with A. Arnold Gillespie.
1942	Douglas Shearer	Mrs. Miniver	Nominated	Shared with A. Arnold Gillespie and Warren Newcombe.
1944	Douglas Shearer	Thirty Seconds Over Tokyo	Won	Shared with A. Arnold Gillespie, Donald Jahraus, and Warren Newcombe.
1947	Douglas Shearer	Green Dolphin Street	Won	Shared with A. Arnold Gillespie, Warren Newcombe, and Michael Steinore.
Special Achievement Award (Note: This was presented as a Special Achievement Award, not as a competitive Academy Award of Merit.)
1978	Les Bowie	Superman	Won	Shared with Colin Chilvers, Denys Coop, Roy Field, Derek Meddings, and Zoran Perisic.
Best Visual Effects
1984	Lorne Peterson	Indiana Jones and the Temple of Doom	Won	Shared with Dennis Muren, Michael J. McAlister, and George Gibbs.
1988	Richard Williams	Who Framed Roger Rabbit	Won	Williams is a Canadian–British animator, voice artist, and writer. Shared with Ken Ralston, Edward Jones, and George Gibbs.
1994	Steve Williams	The Mask	Nominated	Shared with Scott Squires, Tom Bertino, and Jon Farhat.
1999	Rob Coleman	Star Wars: Episode I – The Phantom Menace	Nominated	Shared with John Knoll, Dennis Muren, and Scott Squires.
2002	Rob Coleman	Star Wars: Episode II – Attack of the Clones	Nominated	Shared with Pablo Helman, John Knoll, and Ben Snow.
2014	Cameron Waldbauer	X-Men: Days of Future Past	Nominated	Shared with Richard Stammers, Lou Pecora, and Tim Crosbie.
2015	Cameron Waldbauer	The Revenant	Nominated	Shared with Richard McBride, Matt Shumway, and Jason Smith.
2017	Joel Whist	War for the Planet of the Apes	Nominated	Shared with Joe Letteri, Daniel Barrett, and Dan Lemmon.
2018	Tristan Myles	First Man	Won	Myles is a British-born Canadian. Shared with Paul Lambert, Ian Hunter, and J. D. Schwalm.
2021	Tristan Myles; Brian Connor	Dune	Won	Shared with Paul Lambert and Gerd Nefzer.
2024	Paul Lambert; Stephen James; Rhys Salcombe	Dune: Part Two	Won	Shared with Gerd Nefzer

== Best Writing (Adapted Screenplay) ==
Academy Award for Best Adapted Screenplay
Year	Name	Film	Status	Milestone / Notes
1930	John Meehan	The Divorcee	Nominated	
1965	Stanley Mann	The Collector	Nominated	
1974	Lionel Chetwynd; Mordecai Richler	The Apprenticeship of Duddy Kravitz	Nominated	
1978	Bernard Slade	Same Time, Next Year	Nominated	
1997	Atom Egoyan	The Sweet Hereafter	Nominated	
1999	John Irving	The Cider House Rules	Won	
2004	Paul Haggis	Million Dollar Baby	Nominated	
2007	Sarah Polley	Away from Her	Nominated	
2009	Jason Reitman	Up in the Air	Nominated	Shared with Sheldon Turner.
2009	Neill Blomkamp; Terri Tatchell	District 9	Nominated	Blomkamp is a South African-Canadian.
2015	Emma Donoghue	Room	Nominated	Donoghue is an Irish-Canadian.
2021	Denis Villeneuve	Dune	Nominated	Shared with Jon Spaihts and Eric Roth.
2022	Sarah Polley	Women Talking	Won	

== Best Writing (Original Screenplay) ==
Academy Award for Best Original Screenplay
Year	Name	Film	Status	Milestone / Notes
1975	Ted Allan	Lies My Father Told Me	Nominated	
1984	Daniel Petrie Jr.	Beverly Hills Cop	Nominated	Shared with Danilo Bach.
1994	Roger Avary	Pulp Fiction	Won	Shared with Quentin Tarantino.
2003	Denys Arcand	The Barbarian Invasions	Nominated	
2005	Paul Haggis	Crash	Won	Shared with Robert Moresco.
2006	Paul Haggis	Letters from Iwo Jima	Nominated	Shared with Iris Yamashita.
2023	Celine Song	Past Lives	Nominated	Celine Song is a South Korean-Canadian director and screenwriter.

== Special awards ==
Special Awards
Year	Name	Award
1937	Mack Sennett	Honorary Academy Award.
1946	Harold Russell	Honorary Academy Award "for bringing hope and courage to his fellow veterans through his appearance in The Best Years of Our Lives".
1958	Jack L. Warner	The Irving G. Thalberg Memorial Award.
1968	Onna White	Honorary Academy Award "for her outstanding choreography achievement for Oliver!".
1975	Mary Pickford	Honorary Academy Award "in recognition of her unique contributions to the film industry and the development of film as an artistic medium."
1988	National Film Board of Canada	Academy Honorary Award "in recognition of its 50th anniversary and its dedicated commitment to originate artistic, creative and technological activity and excellence in every area of film making."
1997	Norman Jewison	Irving G. Thalberg Memorial Award.
2001	Arthur Hiller	Jean Hersholt Humanitarian Award
2017	Donald Sutherland	Honorary Academy Award "for a lifetime of indelible characters, rendered with unwavering truthfulness."
2022	Michael J. Fox	Jean Hersholt Humanitarian Award

== Nominations and Winners ==
No. of wins	No. of nominations
94	359

== See also ==
- Cinema of Canada
- List of Canadian films
- Genie Awards
