= 1952 in animation =

Events in 1952 in animation.

== Events ==
=== January ===
- January 1: Norm McLaren releases Voisins (Neighbours).
- January 5: Robert McKimson's Sylvester and Hippety Hopper cartoon Who's Kitten Who? premieres, produced by Warner Bros. Cartoons. Also starring Sylvester Jr.
- January 19: Chuck Jones' Bugs Bunny cartoon Operation: Rabbit premieres, produced by Warner Bros. Cartoons and also starring Wile E. Coyote (in which his name was revealed in this short).
- January 27: Hanna-Barbera's Tom and Jerry cartoon The Two Mouseketeers is first released, produced by MGM's Cartoon Studio. It is the first of several shorts in which the characters appear as musketeers.The short is a parody of Alexandre Dumas' 1844 novel The Three Musketeers and its film adaptations.

=== February ===
- February 2: Chuck Jones' Feed the Kitty premieres, produced by Warner Bros. Cartoons. Starring Marc Anthony and the debut of the kitten Pussyfoot.
- February 8: Jack Hannah's Lambert the Sheepish Lion premieres, produced by Walt Disney Animation Studios.
- February 9: Tex Avery's Magical Maestro premieres, produced by MGM's Cartoon Studio. It features Spike as a canine opera singer. In 1993, Magical Maestro was selected for preservation in the United States National Film Registry by the Library of Congress as being "culturally, historically, or aesthetically significant", making it the only Tex Avery cartoon so far to be inducted.
- February 16: Friz Freleng's Tweety and Sylvester cartoon Gift Wrapped premieres, produced by Warner Bros. Cartoons. Also starring Granny & Hector the Bulldog.
- February 23: Friz Freleng's Bugs Bunny cartoon Foxy by Proxy premieres, produced by Warner Bros. Cartoons. The short is a remake of Tex Avery's cartoon Of Fox and Hounds.

=== March ===
- March 1: Robert McKimson's Porky Pig and Daffy Duck cartoon Thumb Fun premieres, produced by Warner Bros. Cartoons.
- March 15: Friz Freleng's Bugs Bunny and Yosemite Sam cartoon 14 Carrot Rabbit premieres, produced by Warner Bros. Cartoons.
- March 20: 24th Academy Awards: The Two Mouseketeers wins the Academy Award for Best Animated Short.
- March 22: Hanna-Barbera's Tom and Jerry cartoon Push-Button Kitty is first released, produced by MGM's Cartoon Studio. This was the final short in the franchise to feature the controversial character Mammy Two Shoes.
- March 29: Chuck Jones' Pepé Le Pew cartoon Little Beau Pepé premieres, produced by Warner Bros. Cartoons. Also starring Penelope Pussycat.

=== April ===
- April 19: Chuck Jones' second Bugs Bunny and Gossamer cartoon Water, Water Every Hare premieres, produced by Warner Bros. Cartoons. This was Gossamer's final appearance in the Golden Age of Animation.

=== May ===
- May 3: Friz Freleng's Sylvester cartoon Little Red Rodent Hood premieres, produced by Warner Bros. Cartoons.
- May 15: Tex Avery's One Cab's Family premieres, produced by MGM's Cartoon Studio.
- May 24: Chuck Jones' second Wile E. Coyote and Road Runner cartoon Beep, Beep premieres, produced by Warner Bros. Cartoons.

=== June ===
- June 7: Chuck Jones' Bugs Bunny cartoon The Hasty Hare produced by Warner Bros. Cartoons is released. It marks the second appearance of Marvin the Martian now with his iconic nasally voice.
- June 10: Hanna-Barbera's Tom and Jerry cartoon Fit to Be Tied premieres, produced by MGM's Cartoon Studio and also starring Spike.
- June 21: Friz Freleng's Tweety and Sylvester cartoon Ain't She Tweet premieres, produced by Warner Bros. Cartoons. Also starring Granny & Hector the Bulldog.

=== July ===
- July 5: Friz Freleng's Daffy Duck and Porky Pig cartoon Cracked Quack premieres, produced by Warner Bros. Cartoons. This was Freleng's last short to star Porky.
- July 12: Tex Avery's Rock-a-Bye Bear premieres, produced by MGM's Cartoon Studio in which Spike is hired to be a guard dog for a hibernating bear and has to keep quiet or else he'll be fired, and another dog (who looks somewhat similar to Droopy) plans to get Spike to lose his job by getting him to make noise. This was the last short to be directed by Avery before he took his year long sabbatical to recovering from overworking & stress.
- July 26: Robert McKimson's Bugs Bunny cartoon Oily Hare premieres, produced by Warner Bros. Cartoons.

=== August ===
- August 9: Robert McKimson's Sylvester and Hippety Hopper cartoon Hoppy-Go-Lucky premieres, produced by Warner Bros. Cartoons.
- August 23: Chuck Jones' third Wile E. Coyote and Road Runner cartoon Going! Going! Gosh! premieres, produced by Warner Bros. Cartoons.
- August 30: Friz Freleng's Tweety and Sylvester cartoon A Bird in a Guilty Cage premieres, produced by Warner Bros. Cartoons.

=== September ===
- September 20: Chuck Jones' Rabbit Seasoning is first released, produced by Warner Bros. Cartoons; starring Bugs Bunny, Daffy Duck, and Elmer Fudd. It is the second short in The Hunting Trilogy.
- September 27: The Droopy cartoon Caballero Droopy premieres, produced by MGM's Cartoon Studio and also starring Slick McWolf. This was the first MGM short to be directed by Dick Lundy and the first Droopy short to NOT be directed by Tex Avery (due to him being on his Sabbatical break at the time).

=== October ===
- October 4: Friz Freleng's Sylvester cartoon Tree for Two premieres, produced by Warner Bros. Cartoons. This short marks the debut of Spike the Bulldog and Chester the Terrier.
- October 10: Jack Hannah's Donald Duck cartoon Trick or Treat premieres, produced by Walt Disney Animation Studios. It features the debut of Witch Hazel who would become a recurring character in Disney comics.
- October 18: Hanna-Barbera's Tom and Jerry cartoon Cruise Cat premieres, produced by MGM's Cartoon Studio.
- October 22: Hanna-Barbera's Tom and Jerry cartoon The Dog House premieres, produced by MGM's Cartoon Studio and also starring Spike.
- October 31: Jack Kinney's Goofy cartoon Two Weeks Vacation premieres, produced by Walt Disney Animation Studios.

=== November ===
- November 15: Robert McKimson's Bugs Bunny cartoon Rabbit's Kin premieres, produced by Warner Bros. Cartoons which marks the debut of Pete Puma.

=== December ===
- December 13: Robert McKimson's Porky Pig and Daffy Duck cartoon Fool Coverage premieres, produced by Warner Bros. Cartoons.
- December 20: Friz Freleng's Bugs Bunny and Yosemite Sam cartoon Hare Lift premieres, produced by Warner Bros. Cartoons.

=== Specific date unknown ===
- Lev Atamanov's film The Scarlet Flower is first released.
- Ivan Ivanov-Vano and Aleksandra Snezhko-Blotskaya's The Snow Maiden is first released.
- Colin Low's The Romance of Transportation in Canada is first released.
- Norman McLaren's Neighbours premieres.

== Films released ==
- September - The Shepherdess and the Chimney Sweep (France)
- December 22 - The Visions of Tay-Pi (Spain)
- December 31:
  - The Scarlet Flower (Soviet Union)
  - The Snow Maiden (Soviet Union)

== Births ==
=== January ===
- January 19: Beau Weaver, American voice actor (voice of Superman in Superman, Mister Fantastic in Fantastic Four).
- January 20: Dave Fennoy, American actor (voice of Dick Scott in New Kids on the Block, Tetrax in the Ben 10 franchise, Pong Krell in Star Wars: The Clone Wars, Pietro Polendina in RWBY).
- January 28: Bruce Helford, American television writer and producer (The Oblongs).
- January 30: Steve Bartek, American guitarist, composer (Family Dog, Cabin Boy, Nightmare Ned, An Extremely Goofy Movie), orchestrator (The Nightmare Before Christmas, The Tigger Movie, Mickey, Donald, Goofy: The Three Musketeers, Meet the Robinsons, The Simpsons Movie, Bee Movie, Frankenweenie, Epic, Mr. Peabody & Sherman, The Grinch) and music producer (Harvey Beaks).

=== February ===
- February 2: Ryuji Mizuno, Japanese voice actor (voice of Giichi in Naruto, Meme Midgard in Turn A Gundam, B'T Radio in B't X, Master in Zombie Land Saga Revenge, Julius in Berserk), (d. 2022).
- February 5: Yoshinori Kanada, Japanese animator (Birth, worked for Hayao Miyazaki), (d. 2009).
- February 16: James Ingram, American singer and actor (voice of Buster in the English version of The Fearless Four, performed the songs "Somewhere Out There" from An American Tail, and "Our Time Has Come" from Cats Don't Dance), (d. 2019).
- February 17: Garry Chalk, English-born Canadian actor (voice of Optimus Primal in Beast Wars: Transformers, Optimus Prime in the Unicron trilogy, He-Man in The New Adventures of He-Man, Slash, Herr Doktor, and Turbo in ReBoot, Grounder in Adventures of Sonic the Hedgehog, Dr. Robotnik in Sonic Underground, Dr. Light in Mega Man: Fully Charged, King Hippo and Donkey Kong in Captain N: The Game Master, Man-At-Arms in He-Man and the Masters of the Universe, Hercules in Class of the Titans, Mungus in Dragon Tales, Prince Rutherford in My Little Pony: Friendship Is Magic).
- February 18: Salene Weatherwax, American animator (Heidi's Song, Garfield's Feline Fantasies, Tom and Jerry: The Movie), character designer (Hanna-Barbera, The Critic, Animaniacs) and prop designer (Garfield and Friends, Freakazoid!, The Angry Beavers, Family Guy).
- February 23: Brad Whitford, American musician and member of Aerosmith (voiced himself in The Simpsons episode "Flaming Moe's").
- February 24: Steve Rudnick, American writer and producer (Space Jam).
- February 28: William Finn, American composer and lyricist (The Brave Little Toaster to the Rescue, The Brave Little Toaster Goes to Mars, The Adventures of Tom Thumb and Thumbelina), (d. 2025).
- Specific date unknown: Marcelo Tubert, Argentine actor (voice of Mr. Alvarez in Handy Manny, Marty Mendez in King of the Hill, Doc in Hellsing, Hector Papdopolis in the Pinky and the Brain episode "Dangerous Brains", additional voices in The Book of Life and Over the Hedge).

=== March ===
- March 1: Janice Burgess, American television writer, producer and executive (The Backyardigans, Winx Club, Bubble Guppies, Little Bill), (d. 2024).
- March 2:
  - Laraine Newman, American actress, writer and comedian (voice of Connie in The Coneheads, Lois Foutley in As Told by Ginger, Queen Jipjorrulac in The Fairly OddParents, Miss Information in Histeria!, Ella Plankton in SpongeBob SquarePants, Ms. Hubbard in The Oblongs, Queen Ligea in Winx Club, Glummox Mom in Horton Hears a Who!, the Wicked Witch of the West in Tom and Jerry and the Wizard of Oz and Dorothy and the Wizard of Oz, Gran in Dawn of the Croods, Peaches in Ridley Jones, Baby Doll in The New Batman Adventures episode "Love is a Croc", Toby Raynes in the Superman: The Animated Series episode "Apokolips... Now!", Lily in the Avatar: The Last Airbender episode "The Cave of Two Lovers", Lacey Ladybug in The Buzz on Maggie episode "Ladybugged").
  - Mark Evanier, American television writer (Garfield and Friends, Dungeons & Dragons, The Plastic Man Comedy/Adventure Show).
- March 19: Harvey Weinstein, American convicted sex offender and former film producer (Princess Mononoke, Clerks: The Animated Series, Tokyo Pig, Unstable Fables, The Nutty Professor, Hoodwinked Too! Hood vs. Evil, Escape from Planet Earth, Underdogs, Paddington, voiced himself in My Scene Goes Hollywood: The Movie).
- March 22: Bob Costas, American sportscaster (voice of Bob Cutlass in the Cars franchise, himself in The Simpsons episode "Boy Meets Curl", Family Guy, The Critic episode "Marathon Mensch", the Baby Blues episode "The Bitterman Hillbillies", Air Show Announcer in the Voltron: The Third Dimension episode "Escape from Bastille-12").

=== April ===
- April 5: Mitch Pileggi, American actor (voice of Jim Gordon in The Batman, Dr. Stanton in the Batman Beyond episode "Payback").
- April 6: Marilu Henner, American actress (voice of Veronica Vreeland in the DC Animated Universe, Nana's Friend in the Phineas and Ferb episode "Operation Crumb Cake", Lady Catherine in The Legend of Prince Valiant episode "The Trap").
- April 9: Peter Kwong, American actor (voice of Mr. Ho in the King of the Hill episode "A Man Without a Country Club"), (d. 2025).
- April 12: Francis Glebas, American keynote speaker, writer, film director, storyboard artist, and teacher (Walt Disney Animation Studios).
- April 15:
  - Glenn Shadix, American actor (voice of the Mayor of Halloween Town in The Nightmare Before Christmas, Brain and Monsieur Mallah in Teen Titans, Cluemaster in The Batman episode "Q&A"), (d. 2010).
  - Sam McMurray, American actor (voice of Robby Fisher and Buckley Lloyd in Hey Arnold!, various characters in The Boondocks, Postmaster General in Klaus, Pierce in the Batman: The Animated Series episode "Birds of a Feather", Cyrus Tompkins in The Critic episode "Sherman, Woman and Child", Mickey and Fred in the Aaahh!!! Real Monsters episode "Krumm Gets Ahead", Ernie in The New Batman Adventures episode "Joker's Millions", Rodrick Snootwell in The Angry Beavers episode "Dumbwaiters", Flip in The Wild Thornberrys episode "You Otter Know", Larry Lux in The Zeta Project episode "Ro's Reunion", Mr. Gripling in the As Told by Ginger episode "Tgif", Gilbert Halestrom in the Justice League Unlimited episode "Fearful Symmetry", Tucker Wade in the Glenn Martin, DDS episode "From Here to Fraternity", additional voices in Bonkers and Lloyd in Space).
- April 16: Billy West, American voice actor (voice of the title characters in The Ren & Stimpy Show, the title character and Roger Klotz in Doug, Philip J. Fry, Professor Farnsworth, Zoidberg, Zapp Brannigan, and other various characters in Futurama, Red M&M in M&M ads, Bugs Bunny in Space Jam, Shaggy Rogers in Scooby-Doo on Zombie Island, Popeye in Popeye's Voyage: The Quest for Pappy, Bashful in The 7D).
- April 17: Joe Alaskey, American actor (voice of Plucky Duck in Tiny Toon Adventures, Uncle Stinky in Casper, Baby Huey in The Baby Huey Show, Principal Smelling in Codename: Kids Next Door, Soda Vendbot and Newspaper Vendbot in Buzz Lightyear of Star Command, Little Jimmy in Timon & Pumbaa, Jean Paul, Piney and Platypus in Johnny Bravo, Officer Wembly in Scooby-Doo and the Cyber Chase, Hunter and Nuk in Balto II: Wolf Quest, The Sheriff in Back to the Future, Ivan, Storeowner #3 and Eyedrop Salesman in My Life as a Teenage Robot, continued voice of Bugs Bunny, Daffy Duck, Droopy, and Grandpa Lou in Rugrats, announcer for Toon Disney, Additional voices in Where's Wally?, Tom & Jerry Kids, Duck Dodgers and The Garfield Show), (d. 2016).
- April 19: Tony Plana, Cuban actor (voice of Victor and Pedro in Clifford the Big Red Dog, Qapa in Elena of Avalor, El Pintor in the Victor and Valentino episode "Lonely Haunts Club", Kamaljori in The Legend of Vox Machina episode "Into Rimecleft", General Albondiga in the Godzilla: The Series episode "D.O.A.").
- April 20: Mark Schiff, American actor and comedian (voice of Little Dog in 2 Stupid Dogs, Boy Beaver in the Timon & Pumbaa episode "Amusement Bark", himself in the Dr. Katz, Professional Therapist episode "Mask").
- April 27: Hilary Bader, American television writer (Warner Bros. Animation), (d. 2002).
- April 29: Nora Dunn, American actress and comedian (voice of Lydia Karaoke, Statue of Liberty and Barbara S. in Histeria!, Frieda in The Wild Thornberrys, Coach Candace and Philbert in As Told by Ginger, Gigi in The Boss Baby: Back in Business, Precious in the Pinky and the Brain episode "Brainwashed: Part 3 - Wash Harder", Morgan Proctor in the Futurama episode "How Hermes Requisitioned His Groove Back").

=== May ===
- May 2: Christine Baranski, American actress (voice of Mrs. Devine in Fancy Nancy, Verus in Magical Girl Friendship Squad, Amanda Hannity in BoJack Horseman, Joyce Crandall in The Loud House episode "Save Royal Woods!", Guardian in the Regular Show episode "A Regular Epic Final Battle", herself in The Simpsons episode "Portrait of a Lackey on Fire" and the Family Guy episode "Call Girl").
- May 6: Fred Newman, American actor (voice of Porkchop, Skeeter Valentine, and Mr. Dink in Doug, Stupid in Who Framed Roger Rabbit).
- May 8: Kent Holaday, American animator (Walt Disney Animation Studios, Maxie's World, BraveStarr, Who Framed Roger Rabbit, The New Adventures of Beany and Cecil, Mighty Mouse: The New Adventures) and lip sync artist (DIC Entertainment, The Simpsons, The New Adventures of He-Man, Captain Planet and the Planeteers, The Ren & Stimpy Show, Rocko's Modern Life, Klasky Csupo, The Critic, The Maxx, King of the Hill, Daria, Celebrity Deathmatch, Futurama, Sheep in the Big City, Baby Blues), (d. 2001).
- May 9: Chuck Russell, American director, screenwriter and producer (played himself in the Space Ghost Coast to Coast episode "The Mask", and created The Mask movie which later got an animated adaptation), (d. 2026).
- May 11: Shohreh Aghdashloo, Iranian-American actress (voice of Mehrnaz in Window Horses, Queen Janna in The Lion Guard, Enforcer Grayson in Arcane, Hat Salesperson in the Curious George episode "The Clean, Perfect Yellow Hat", Mina in The Simpsons episode "MyPods and Boomsticks", additional voices in the Archer episode "The Big Con").
- May 12: Christopher Gaze, English actor (voice of Zeus in Class of the Titans, The Wizard in Pocket Dragon Adventures, General Seaspray in My Little Pony: Friendship is Magic).
- May 14: Robert Zemeckis, American filmmaker (Who Framed Roger Rabbit, The Polar Express, Monster House, Beowulf, A Christmas Carol, Mars Needs Moms, Pinocchio).
- May 15: Chazz Palminteri, American actor (voice of Buster in Lady and the Tramp II: Scamp's Adventure, Woolworth in Hoodwinked!, Tiny the Slug in the Bubble Guppies episode "A Slow Day in Zippy City").
- May 18: Diane Duane, American author, and writer (Hanna-Barbera, Sunbow Productions, Disney Television Animation, Dinosaucers, Batman: The Animated Series, Spider-Man Unlimited, Barbie: Fairytopia).
- May 21: Mr. T, American actor and professional wrestler (voice of Mr. T-Rex in The Terrible Thunderlizards, Earl Devereaux in Cloudy with a Chance of Meatballs, himself in Mister T, the Alvin and the Chipmunks episode "The C Team", the House of Mouse episode "House Ghosts", the Johnny Bravo episode "T Is for Trouble", and The Simpsons episode "Today I Am a Clown").
- May 25: Ramon Pipin, French singer, songwriter and composer (Highlander: The Animated Series, Space Goofs, The New Adventures of Lucky Luke).
- May 28:
  - Denis Akiyama, Japanese-Canadian voice actor (voice of Iceman, Silver Samurai, and Sunfire in X-Men and Malachite in the original English dub of Sailor Moon), (d. 2018).
  - Tad Stones, American animator (The Rescuers, The Fox and the Hound), storyboard artist (The Adventures of Brer Rabbit, Dante's Inferno: An Animated Epic, Neighbors from Hell, Scooby-Doo! Mystery Incorporated, Bob's Burgers, Allen Gregory, Ben 10: Destroy All Aliens), screenwriter (Sport Goofy in Soccermania, Disney Television Animation, Hellboy Animated, The Super Hero Squad Show, Generator Rex, The Adventures of Puss in Boots, Kulipari), producer (The Adventures of Brer Rabbit, Hellboy Animated, Secrets of the Furious Five) and director (Disney Television Animation, Hellboy Animated, Turok: Son of Stone, Kulipari).
- May 31: David Anthony Kraft, American comics writer, critic, publisher and animation screenwriter (G.I. Joe Extreme, Street Fighter), (d. 2021).

=== June ===
- June 4: Kerry Shale, Canadian actor (voice of Henry, Gordon, and Topham Hatt in Thomas & Friends, Larry Needlemeyer in The Amazing World of Gumball, Chameleon in the US dub of Tinga Tinga Tales).
- June 6: Harvey Fierstein, American actor, playwright and screenwriter (voice of Yao in Mulan and Mulan II, Fat Cat Burglar in Foodfight!, Esmeralda in Animal Crackers, Karl in The Simpsons episode "Simpson and Delilah", Mrs. Leaperman in the Happily Ever After: Fairy Tales for Every Child episode "Thumbelina", Argus Panoptes in the Hercules episode "Hercules and the Bacchanal", Tracy in the Family Guy episode "The Former Life of Brian", himself in the BoJack Horseman episode "Commence Fracking").
- June 7: Liam Neeson, Irish actor (voice of Aslan in The Chronicles of Narnia, Fujimoto in Ponyo, John Paul Jones in Liberty's Kids, Qui-Gon Jinn in Star Wars: The Clone Wars and Tales of the Jedi, Racoon in The Nut Job, Bad Cop/Good Cop in The Lego Movie, Father Sean in The Simpsons episode "The Father, the Son, and the Holy Guest Star", himself in the Family Guy episodes "Brian's a Bad Father" and "Fighting Irish").
- June 18:
  - Miriam Flynn, American actress (voice of Jean Tasmanian Devil in Taz-Mania, Grandma Longneck in The Land Before Time franchise, Mildred Tabootie in ChalkZone, Gandra Dee in DuckTales, Lonely Sue in The Legend of Calamity Jane, Vera Tennyson in the Ben 10 episode "Permanent Retirement").
  - Isabella Rossellini, Italian actress, author, philanthropist and model (voice of Ms. Canvenini in My Dog Tulip, Ambassador Henrietta Selick in Incredibles 2, Bat Queen in The Owl House, Astrid Weller in The Simpsons episode "Mom and Pop Art", Pat in the Tuca & Bertie episode "The Jelly Lakes").
  - Carol Kane, American actress (voice of Brawnhilda in Aladdin, Maude in As Told by Ginger, Gilda in The Happy Elf, Sheep in Secrets of the Furious Five, Nana Shapiro in Phineas and Ferb, Sea Witch in Jake and the Never Land Pirates, Chompy in Animals, Madam Canardist in Rapunzel's Tangled Adventure, Madame Spook in Vampirina, Sue's Mother and Marilyn Chilson in F Is for Family, Ginger in OK K.O.! Let's Be Heroes, Ollie in the Tiny Toon Adventures episode "A Quack in the Quarks", Maggie Simpson in The Simpsons episode "Bart vs. Thanksgiving", Emily Dickinson Trophy in the Hey Arnold! episode "Phoebe Cheats", The Beetle in the Adventures from the Book of Virtues episode "Patience", Little Miss Muffet in the Blue's Clues episode "Blue's Big Treasure Hunt", Carol in the Family Guy episode "Emission Impossible", Mrs. Claus in The Grim Adventures of Billy & Mandy episode "Billy and Mandy Save Christmas", Grandma Troll in the Dora the Explorer episode "The Grumpy Old Troll Gets Married", Jelly Goodwell in the Star vs. the Forces of Evil episode "Starfari", Barb Jr. in the Summer Camp Island episode "The Great Elf Invention Convention", Sea Witch in the Bubble Guppies episode "The New Guppy!", Menopause Banshee in the Big Mouth episode "Florida").
- June 20: John Goodman, American actor (voice of Sulley in the Monsters, Inc. franchise, Pacha in The Emperor's New Groove franchise, Frosty the Snowman in Frosty Returns, Baloo in The Jungle Book 2, Eli "Big Daddy" La Bouff in The Princess and the Frog, Larry in Father of the Pride, Robot Santa in the Futurama episode "Xmas Story", Mr. Prenderghast in ParaNorman).
- June 22:
  - Barry Anthony Trop, American composer (Captain Zed and the Zee Zone, Big Bad Beetleborgs, SpongeBob SquarePants), (d. 2016).
  - Graham Greene, Canadian actor (voice of Lost Land Shaman in Turok: Son of Stone, Brown Bear in the Happily Ever After: Fairy Tales for Every Child episode "Snow White"), (d. 2025).
- June 30: Patrick Pinney, American voice actor (voice of Mighty Mouse in Mighty Mouse: The New Adventures, Mainframe in G.I. Joe: A Real American Hero, Pa Gorg, Traveling Matt, and Flange Doozer in Fraggle Rock: The Animated Series, Wolverine in X-Men: Pryde of the X-Men, Cyclops in Hercules, Ben Grimm / Thing in Spider-Man, Painty the Pirate in SpongeBob SquarePants, additional voices in The Chipmunk Adventure, The Little Mermaid, DuckTales the Movie: Treasure of the Lost Lamp, Beauty and the Beast, An American Tail: Fievel Goes West, Aladdin, Toy Story, The Hunchback of Notre Dame, Mulan, Lilo & Stitch, and Treasure Planet).

=== July ===
- July 1:
  - Brian George, English actor (voice of Mr. Fettuccini in The Care Bears Movie, Duff Killigan in Kim Possible, Guru Pathik in Avatar: The Last Airbender, Professor Pyg in Beware the Batman, Appa Ali Apsa in Green Lantern: The Animated Series, Ki-Adi-Mundi in the Star Wars franchise, Mr. Frowny in the Steven Universe episode "Future Boy Zoltron", Jazzman in the Batman: The Animated Series episode "I Am the Night").
  - Dan Aykroyd, Canadian actor, comedian and musician (voice of Beldar in The Coneheads, Chip in Antz, the title character in Yogi Bear, Scarecrow in Legends of Oz: Dorothy's Return, Postage Stamp Fellow in The Simpsons episode "The Dad-Feelings Limited", himself in the Family Guy episode "Spies Reminiscent of Us").
- July 4: Ray Pointer, American animation historian, animator (Tom and Jerry: The Movie), sheet timer (Sonic the Hedgehog, CatDog, Oh Yeah! Cartoons) and director (Nickelodeon Animation Studio).
- July 8: Doug Molitor, American television writer (DIC Entertainment, Nelvana, Teenage Mutant Ninja Turtles, Beetlejuice, Captain Planet and the Planeteers, James Bond Jr., Free Willy, Happily Ever After: Fairy Tales for Every Child, Ripley's Believe It or Not!, Roswell Conspiracies: Aliens, Myths and Legends, Flight Squad, Sitting Ducks, Totally Spies!, X-Men: Evolution, Pet Alien, Pucca, The Penguins of Madagascar, Kid vs. Kat, Wild Grinders, Transformers: Rescue Bots).
- July 9: John Tesh, American pianist, composer (Bobby's World) and actor (voice of John Teshadactyl in Hollyrock-a-Bye Baby, himself in the Pinky and the Brain episode "A Pinky and the Brain Halloween").
- July 12: Stephen R. Johnson, American animator, painter, television director and music video director (Sledgehammer), (d. 2015).
- July 15: Marky Ramone, American drummer and member of the Ramones (voiced himself in The Simpsons episode "Rosebud" and the Uncle Grandpa episode "Late Night Good Morning with Uncle Grandpa").
- July 17: David Hasselhoff, American actor and singer (portrayed himself in The SpongeBob SquarePants Movie, Hop, the SpongeBob SquarePants episode "SpongeBob's Big Birthday Blowout", voice of various characters in Robot Chicken, Dr. Chimp and Cheese Wizard Caller in TripTank, himself in the Close Enough episode "Clap Like This").
- July 20: David Anderson, English animator (Dreamland Express), (d. 2015).
- July 21: George Wallace, American comedian and actor (voice of Mr. Higgins in Bob's Burgers, Hawthorne Wingo in C-Bear and Jamal, Nelson's Dad in Ten Year Old Tom, Farmer and Baba Mustafa in Happily Ever After: Fairy Tales for Every Child, Leonard in the Mike Tyson Mysteries episode "The Stein Way", Dante in The Life & Times of Tim episode "Tim's Hair Looks Amazing", Card Player #4 in Bebe's Kids).

=== August ===
- August 12: Keith Dinicol, Canadian actor (voice of Willow 1 in Anne of Green Gables: The Animated Series), (d. 2021).
- August 16: Reginald VelJohnson, American actor (voice of Jerry in 3Below: Tales of Arcadia, Snowy Owl in Glisten and the Merry Mission, Mr. Flannigan in the Penn Zero: Part-Time Hero episode "My Mischievous Son").
- August 18: Patrick Swayze, American actor, dancer and singer (voice of Cash in The Fox and the Hound 2), (d. 2009).
- August 19: Jonathan Frakes, American actor and director (voice of David Xanatos, Coyote and Alexander Fox in Gargoyles, William Riker in Star Trek: Lower Decks and the Family Guy episode "Peter's Got Woods", Grandpa Vincent in Miles from Tomorrowland, J'son in Guardians of the Galaxy, Steak Starbolt in Future-Worm!, King Faraday and Boss Moxie in Catwoman: Hunted, Peter in the Glenn Martin, DDS episode "GlennHog Day", High Evolutionary in The Super Hero Squad Show episode "The Devil Dinosaur You Say!", Adult Finn in the Adventure Time episodes "Puhoy" and "Dungeon Train", himself in the Futurama episode "Where No Fan Has Gone Before" and the Family Guy episode "Not All Dogs Go to Heaven").
- August 20: Dan Haskett, American animator (Raggedy Ann & Andy: A Musical Adventure, Animalympics, Easter Fever, Take Me Up to the Ball Game, The Fox and the Hound, Alvin and the Chipmunks, The Cabbage Patch Kids' First Christmas, The Chipmunk Adventure, Pinocchio and the Emperor of the Night, Daffy Duck's Quackbusters, Sesame Street, The New Adventures of Beany and Cecil, The Simpsons, Tom and Jerry: The Movie, The Swan Princess, The Pagemaster, The Sissy Duckling, Larryboy: The Cartoon Adventures, Space Jam: A New Legacy), storyboard artist (The Chipmunk Adventure, Police Academy, Garfield and Friends, The Smurfs, Bill & Ted's Excellent Adventures, Buster & Chauncey's Silent Night, Larryboy: The Cartoon Adventures, I Spy, Winnie the Pooh: Springtime with Roo, Johnny Bravo, Warner Bros. Animation, The Proud Family, Clifford's Puppy Days, Arthur's Missing Pal, Class of 3000, The Spectacular Spider-Man, The Fairly OddParents, Angelina Ballerina: The Next Steps), character designer (The Brave Little Toaster, Daffy Duck's Quackbusters, The Little Mermaid, The Simpsons, Beauty and the Beast, Warner Bros. Animation, FernGully: The Last Rainforest, Buster & Chauncey's Silent Night, Disneytoon Studios, The Prince of Egypt, The Sissy Duckling, The Nuttiest Nutcracker, Happily Ever After: Fairy Tales for Every Child, Globehunters: An Around the World in 80 Days Adventure, Johnny Bravo, The Land Before Time XI: Invasion of the Tinysauruses, Mosaic, Legends of Oz: Dorothy's Return, Madea's Tough Love) and art director (Johnny Bravo).
- August 21: Kumiko Takizawa, Japanese voice actress (voice of Grandis in Nadia: The Secret of Blue Water, Kate Hathaway and Lucina Pressette in Ginga Hyōryū Vifam, Shaya Thoov in The Super Dimension Century Orguss, Madoka Nagasaki in Miss Machiko, Panther Zora in New Cutie Honey, Naoko in Nabari no Ou, dub voice of Anabelle in All Dogs Go to Heaven), (d. 2022).
- August 24: Vaneese Thomas, American R&B, jazz and soul blues singer (voice of Clio in the Hercules franchise).
- August 26:
  - Michael Jeter, American actor (voice of Smokey and Steamer in The Polar Express, Biederman in The Wild Thornberrys, William Blay in the Duckman episode "Ajax & Ajaxer", Runta in the Aladdin episode "Stinker Belle"), (d. 2003).
  - Franco Zucca, Italian voice actor (dub voice of Mandarin in Iron Man, Manty in A Bug's Life, Fezziwig in Christmas Carol: The Movie, George Sanderson in Monsters, Inc., Monstar Bang in Space Jam, Jorgen Von Strangle in The Fairly OddParents, Zeke in Ice Age, Erik Hellstrom in Atlantis: The Lost Empire, Pachacamac in Sonic X, Lawrence in The Princess and the Frog, Furgus in Rango, Able in Tron: Uprising, Tom Jumbo-Grumbo in BoJack Horseman, Jerry Jumbeaux in Zootopia, Veterinarian in The Dragon Prince, Cat in Trollhunters: Tales of Arcadia, Joseph Roulin in Loving Vincent, Lord Piggot-Dunceby in Missing Link), (d. 2022).
- August 27: Paul Reubens, American actor and comedian (voice of Bat-Mite in Batman: The Brave and the Bold, Lock in The Nightmare Before Christmas, Fife in Beauty and the Beast: The Enchanted Christmas, Jokey Smurf in The Smurfs, and The Smurfs 2, Dennis in Teacher's Pet, Reuben in Chowder, Pavel in Tron: Uprising, Golly Gopher in Re-Animated, RX-24 in the Star Wars Rebels episode "Droids in Distress"), (d. 2023).

=== September ===
- September 1:
  - Phil Hendrie, American radio personality and voice actor (voice of various characters in King of the Hill, Free Waterfall Jr., Free Waterfall Sr., Old Man Waterfall, Frida Waterfall, Hutch Waterfall and the Encyclopod in Futurama, Doctor Jeff, Coach Pratt, Counselor Critchlow, Mr. Masthead, Art Doodle and Old Owl Judge in Napoleon Dynamite, Enchanted Forest Ranger and Flappy Jackson in The 7D, Principal Vagina and other various characters in Rick and Morty, Football Coach and Galvin in Squidbillies, Pyro Moth and Universe Simulator in The Midnight Gospel, Jim Jeffords, Reid Harrison and other various characters in F Is for Family, Mayor in The Replacements episode "Skate-Gate", Action Cops in the Unikitty! episode "License to Punch").
  - Michael Massee, American actor (voice of Bruce Banner in Ultimate Avengers: The Movie and Ultimate Avengers 2: Rise of the Panther, Spellbinder in The Batman episode "The Butler Did It"), (d. 2016).
- September 5: Michael Horton, American actor (voice of Rick Jones in The Incredible Hulk, Chip Chase in The Transformers, Jeff Wright, Craig Phillips, Mason Hawthorne and Alan in Jem, The Prince in Happily Ever After, Vytor in Vytor: The Starfire Champion, Boink in Zazoo U, Arn in The Legend of Prince Valiant, John Jameson in Spider-Man, Tommy Talltree in the G.I. Joe: A Real American Hero episode "Operation Mind Menace", additional voices in Lazer Tag Academy, The Karate Kid, Extreme Ghostbusters, and The Brothers Flub).
- September 8: Takaya Hashi, Japanese voice actor (voice of Kakuzu in the Naruto franchise, Toki in Fist of the North Star, John Winchester in Supernatural: The Animation, Hayakawa in Doomed Megalopolis, Ketto's Father in Kiki's Delivery Service, Alex Rey in Black Jack, Kumazawa in Twilight of the Dark Master, Lyon in Metropolis, Dr. Kestner in Appleseed Ex Machina, High Seeker in Dragon Age: Dawn of the Seeker, Obadiah Stane in Iron Man: Rise of Technovore, Izamura in Patema Inverted, Dr. Traum in Hug! PreCure, Niander Wallace Sr. in Blade Runner: Black Lotus, Donovan Desmond in Spy x Family), (d. 2025).
- September 10: Gerry Conway, American comic book writer and screenwriter (My Little Pony, The Transformers, G.I. Joe: A Real American Hero, Dino-Riders, The Centurions, Dinosaucers, Batman: The Animated Series, Spider-Man), (d. 2026).
- September 25: Christopher Reeve, American actor (voice of Clark Kent in a AT&T commercial, It Zwibble in the HBO Storybook Musicals episode "Earthday Birthday"), director (Everyone's Hero), and Activist, (d. 2004).
- September 27:
  - R.J. Kizer, American editor (The Lion King, The Return of Jafar, Megamind), (d. 2026).
  - Deanna Oliver, American television writer (Tiny Toon Adventures, Animaniacs, Casper) and actress (voice of Toaster in The Brave Little Toaster franchise, various characters in Animaniacs, Trish Mahoney in Family Dog, Tangy the Candy Sprite in The 7D episode "Big Rock Candy Flim-Flam").
- September 28: George Scribner, American animator (Hanna-Barbera, Walt Disney Animation Studios).
- September 29: Gábor Csupó, Hungarian-American animator, writer, director, producer and graphic designer (co-founder of Klasky Csupo).

=== October ===
- October 16: Ron Taylor, American actor, singer and writer (voice of Bleeding Gums Murphy in The Simpsons, Mugsy and Bruno in Rover Dangerfield, Orderly in the Batman: The Animated Series episode "Dreams in Darkness", Ibalo in the Aaahh!!! Real Monsters episode "The Switching Hour"), (d. 2002).
- October 18: Chuck Lorre, American actor, composer, television producer and writer (DIC Entertainment, Marvel Productions, Toxic Crusaders).
- October 21: Matt Landers, American actor (voice of Frankie in Batman: The Animated Series, Captain Logan in Bill & Ted's Excellent Adventures, Louie in the Batman Beyond episode "Terry's Friend Dates A Robot", Turk in the Freakazoid! episode "Hot Rods from Heck!", Gang Leader in The New Batman Adventures episode "Growing Pains", Robber in the Superman: The Animated Series episode "Heavy Metal"), (d. 2015).
- October 22: Jeff Goldblum, American actor and musician (voice of Verminous Skumm in Captain Planet and the Planeteers, Aaron in The Prince of Egypt, Ajax in Zambezia, Dr. Armstrong in The Boss Baby: Family Business, Duke in Isle of Dogs, White Rabbit in Robbie the Reindeer in Legend of the Lost Tribe, Dr. Vayzosa in the King of the Hill episode "The Substitute Spanish Prisoner", Bill Joel in the Tom Goes to the Mayor episode "Toodle Day", Perry Van Moon in the Allen Gregory episode "Van Moon Rising", God in the Happy! episode "Resurrection", the Grandmaster in the What If... episode "What If... Thor Were an Only Child?", MacArthur Parker in The Simpsons episode "A Fish Called Selma", himself in the Dr. Katz, Professional Therapist episode "Sissy Boy").
- October 23: Diane D'Aquila, Canadian-American actress (voice of Grandmother Bear in Little Bear).
- October 24: Ted Mann, Canadian-American screenwriter (The Real Ghostbusters), (d. 2025).
- October 28: Annie Potts, American actress (voice of Bo Peep in the Toy Story franchise, Edmee in Arlo the Alligator Boy).

=== November ===
- November 2: Andy Paley, American songwriter, composer, and record producer (Nickelodeon Animation Studio, Cartoon Network Studios, Handy Manny, Digimon Adventure), (d. 2024).
- November 3:
  - Jim Cummings, American voice actor (voice of the title character and Negaduck in Darkwing Duck, Fat Cat, Monterey Jack, and Norton Nimul in Chip 'n Dale: Rescue Rangers, Ray in The Princess and the Frog, Lord Boxman in OK K.O.! Let's Be Heroes, Don Karnage and Louie in TaleSpin, Cat in CatDog, Dr. Robotnik in Sonic the Hedgehog, Fuzzy Lumpkins in The Powerpuff Girls, the title character and Lucky Piquel in Bonkers, Hondo Ohnaka in the Star Wars franchise, Ed in The Lion King, Psy-Crow and Bob the Killer Goldfish in Earthworm Jim, continued voice of Winnie the Pooh, Tigger, and Pete for Disney, the Tasmanian Devil in the Looney Tunes franchise).
  - Roseanne Barr, American actress, comedian, (voice of Maggie in Home on the Range, Kraang Prime in Teenage Mutant Ninja Turtles, herself in the Futurama episode "Three Hundred Big Boys"), writer and producer (Little Rosey).
- November 5:
  - Laslo Nosek, Hungarian animator, storyboard artist (The Adventures of the Galaxy Rangers), character designer, art director, production designer, writer and producer (Klasky Csupo, co-creator of The Brothers Flub).
  - Bill Walton, American basketball player and sportscaster (voice of himself in the American Dad! episode "Shakedown Steve"), (d. 2024).
- November 8: Alfre Woodard, American actress (voice of Plio in Dinosaur, Maisie in The Brave Little Toaster to the Rescue, Akela in The Wild Thornberrys Movie, Mimi in Moon Girl and Devil Dinosaur, Wilnoome in the Happily Ever After: Fairy Tales for Every Child episode "Goldilocks and the Three Bears", Jean Hawkins in the Static Shock episode "Flashback", Polly in John Henry).
- November 14:
  - Bill Farmer, American voice actor, comedian and impressionist (voice of Foghorn Leghorn, Sylvester and Yosemite Sam in Space Jam, the President in Totally Spies, Stinkie in Casper: A Spirited Beginning and Casper Meets Wendy, Doc in The 7D, Hop Pop in Amphibia, continued voice of Goofy, Pluto and Horace Horsecollar).
  - Maggie Roswell, American actress, comedian, writer and producer (voice of Teegra in Fire and Ice, Pearl Pureheart in Mighty Mouse: The New Adventures, Little Girl in Yogi and the Invasion of the Space Bears, Barbara Simone in A Pup Named Scooby-Doo, Maude Flanders, Helen Lovejoy, Luann Van Houten, Miss Hoover, and other various characters in The Simpsons, News Reporter and Superheroine in Darkwing Duck, Anita the Hairdresser in the Bonkers episode "Weather or Not", Caitlyn in the Teenage Mutant Ninja Turtles episode "The Great Boldini", Mary Vain in the Tiny Toon Adventures episode "Hollywood Plucky").
- November 15: Randy Savage, American professional wrestler and actor (voice of Thug in Bolt, Sasquatch in The X's, Rasslor in the Dexter's Laboratory episode of the same name, Leonard Ghostal in the Space Ghost Coast to Coast episode "Piledriver", Master Sergeant Emily Dickinson Jones in the Duck Dodgers episode "Back to the Academy", Biker in the Whatever Happened to Robot Jones? episode "Family Vacation", Gorilla in the King of the Hill episode "Bill, Bulk and the Body Buddies"), (d. 2011).
- November 16:
  - Shigeru Miyamoto, Japanese video game designer, director, and producer (The Super Mario Bros. Movie).
  - Peter Keefe, American television producer (Voltron, Denver the Last Dinosaur, Widget) and co-founder of Zodiac Entertainment, (d. 2010).
- November 20: Steven Wilzbach, American animator (Warner Bros. Feature Animation), camera operator (DePatie-Freleng Enterprises, Filmation, Hanna-Barbera, The Prince and the Pauper, Rover Dangerfield, FernGully: The Last Rainforest, Tom and Jerry: The Movie, The Swan Princess), cinematographer (The Iron Giant) and producer (Eight Crazy Nights, The SpongeBob SquarePants Movie, Tutenstein), (d. 2022).
- November 28: Rif Hutton, American actor (voice of Crewman #1 in Tugger: The Jeep 4x4 Who Wanted to Fly, Metro City Sergeant in Astro Boy, DJ in The Princess and the Frog, Blithe Hollow Townsperson in ParaNorman, High Official in Kingsglaive: Final Fantasy XV, Cop #1 in The Twits, provided additional voices for Osmosis Jones, The Madagascar Penguins in a Christmas Caper, Curious George, Open Season 3, Epic, Mr. Peabody & Sherman, Ice Age: Collision Course, Resident Evil: Vendetta, The Star, Spider-Man: Into the Spider-Verse, Paws of Fury: The Legend of Hank, The Wind Rises, The Tale of Despeeraux, Lightyear), (d. 2026).
- November 30:
  - Mandy Patinkin, American actor and singer (voice of Louie in Castle in the Sky, Stanley Irving in Everyone's Hero, Basil in Jock the Hero Dog, Hattori in The Wind Rises, Papa Smurf in Smurfs: The Lost Village, Hugh Parkfield in The Simpsons episode "Lisa's Wedding", Hippocrates in the Hercules episode "Hercules and the World's First Doctor", The Groundhog in the Wonder Pets! episode "Help the Groundhog!", Mr. Lambert in the Nina's World episode "Nina's Library Hop").
  - Henry Selick, American film director, producer, and writer (The Nightmare Before Christmas, James and the Giant Peach, Coraline, Wendell & Wild).
  - Keith Giffen, American comic book artist, television writer (The Real Ghostbusters, Ed, Edd n Eddy, Hi Hi Puffy AmiYumi) and storyboard artist (Spider-Man Unlimited, Batman Beyond, Static Shock), (d. 2023).

=== December ===
- December 2: Keith Szarabajka, American actor (voice of Kip O'Donnell in The Wild Thornberrys, Cikatro Vizago in Star Wars Rebels, Lieutenant Rockford in the Roughnecks: Starship Troopers Chronicles episode "D-Day", Living Laser in the Ultimate Spider-Man episode "Flight of the Iron Spider", Ronan the Accuser in The Avengers: Earth's Mightiest Heroes episode "Welcome to the Kree Empire", Rodin Krick in The Zeta Project episode "Taffy Time").
- December 9: Michael Dorn, American voice actor (voice of the title character in I Am Weasel, Coldstone in Gargoyles, Kalibak in the DC Animated Universe, Steel in Superman: The Animated Series, the Martian Centurion Robots in Duck Dodgers, Rufus 3000 in Kim Possible: A Sitch in Time, Worf, and himself in Family Guy, Battle Beast in Invincible, Atrocitus in Justice League Action, Dr. Viktor and Frankenstrike in the Ben 10 franchise, Ronan the Accuser in The Super Hero Squad Show).
- December 12: Sarah Douglas, English actress (voice of Queen in Batman Beyond, Alana Ulanova in the Iron Man episode "Enemy Within, Enemy Without", Una in the Gargoyles episode "M.I.A.", Mrs. Cadbury in The Real Adventures of Jonny Quest episode "Village of the Doomed", Mala in the Superman: The Animated Series episode "Absolute Power").
- December 19:
  - Linda Woolverton, American screenwriter (Walt Disney Animation Studios).
  - Walter Murphy, American composer (Channel Umptee-3, Family Guy, Fillmore!, American Dad!, Seth MacFarlane's Cavalcade of Cartoon Comedy, The Cleveland Show, Foodfight!, How Murray Saved Christmas), keyboardist, songwriter, music producer and orchestrator (Teacher's Pet, Mickey's Twice Upon a Christmas).
- December 25: CCH Pounder, Guyanese-American actress (voice of Amanda Waller in Justice League Unlimited, Superman/Batman: Public Enemies, and Batman: Assault on Arkham, Officer Shirley in season 1 of Rocket Power, Coldfire in Gargoyles, Marion Grange in Beware the Batman, Kongwe in The Lion Guard episode "The Wisdom of Kongwe").
- December 29: Efron Etkin, Israeli actor (dub voice of Piglet in Winnie the Pooh and Dolf in Alfred J. Kwak), (d. 2012).

=== Specific date unknown ===
- John P. McCann, American television producer and writer (Warner Bros. Animation, The Adventures of Jimmy Neutron, Boy Genius, Dave the Barbarian, Catscratch, Biker Mice from Mars, Animalia, Pink Panther and Pals, Kung Fu Panda: Legends of Awesomeness, The 7D, The Mr. Peabody & Sherman Show), and voice actor (voice of Douglas Douglas and Hero Boy in Freakazoid!).
- Ronald A. Weinberg, American-born Canadian former television producer and businessman (co-founder of CINAR).
- Bill St. James, American announcer and radio personality (voice of Announcer in The Angry Beavers episode "Dagski and Norb", Grandpa Panda in the Go, Diego, Go! episode "All Aboard the Giant Panda Express!", announcer for Nickelodeon and Adult Swim).
- Christopher Hinton, Canadian film animator, film director and professor (National Film Board of Canada, Blowhard, Blackfly, Nibbles and cNote).
- Christy Marx, American scriptwriter (Jem, G.I. Joe, Teenage Mutant Ninja Turtles, Conan the Adventurer, Spider-Man and His Amazing Friends, Bucky O'Hare and the Toad Wars!, Mighty Max).

== Deaths ==
=== March ===
- March 1: Gregory La Cava, American animator and film director (Raoul Barré, International Film Service), dies at age 59.
- March 25: Egon von Tresckow, German animator, illustrator, comics artist and caricaturist (worked for UFA and the films of Hans Fischerkoesen), dies at age 45.

=== June ===
- June 25: Fred Brunish, American painter and animator (Walter Lantz), dies at age 49 or 50.

=== November ===
- November 23: Fred Moore, American animator (Walt Disney Company), dies at age 41.

== See also ==
- List of anime by release date (1946–1959)
