= Jean Little First-Novel Award =

Canadian literary award for first middle-grade novel

The Jean Little First-Novel Award is a Canadian literary award, administered by the Canadian Children's Book Centre, to recognize a Canadian author's first middle-grade novel.

Named in honour of the late Jean Little, the award was established by fellow children's authors and Little's friends, Sarah Ellis, Kit Pearson, and Maggie de Vries, who is also Little's niece. The award carries a monetary prize of $5,000. Jean Little (1932–2020) was an award-winning Canadian writer of more than 50 books for young readers.

The award is one of several presented by the Canadian Children's Book Centre each year; others include the Norma Fleck Award for Canadian Children's Non-Fiction, the Geoffrey Bilson Award for Historical Fiction for Young People and the Marilyn Baillie Picture Book Award.

== Honourees ==
Award winners and finalists
Year	Author	Title	Publisher	Result	Ref.
2021	Tziporah Cohen	No Vacancy	Groundwood Books	Winner	
2021	Nadine Neema	Journal of a Travelling Girl	Wandering Fox	Finalist	
2021	Alisa Siegel	My Name is Konisola	Second Story Press	Finalist	
2022	Leslie Gentile	Elvis, Me, and the Lemonade Stand Summer	DCB Young Readers	Winner	
2022	Rosena Fung	Living with Viola	Annick Press	Finalist	
2022	Chad Lucas	Thanks a Lot, Universe	Amulet Books	Finalist	
2023	Kim Spencer	Weird Rules to Follow	Orca Book Publishers	Winner	
2023	Dee Hahn	The Grave Thief	Puffin Canada	Finalist	
2023	Jane Baird Warren	How to Be a Goldfish	Scholastic Canada	Finalist	
2023	Jade Armstrong	Scout Is Not a Band Kid	Orca Book Publishers	Finalist	
2023	Sid Sharp	The Wolf Suit	Annick Press	Finalist	
2024	Tho Pham and Sandra MacTavish	The Cricket War	Kids Can Press	Winner	
2024	Alan Barillaro	Where the Water Takes Us	Candlewick Press	Finalist	
2024	Joanna Cacao	The Secret of the Ravens	Clarion Books	Finalist	
2024	Emi Pinto	Bee Bakshi and the Gingerbread Sisters	HarperCollins	Finalist	
2024	A. T. Woodley and Mike Deas	The Boy Who Woke the Sun	Red Deer Press	Finalist	
2025	Ray Xu	Alterations	Union Square Kids	Winner	
2025	Calyssa Erb	Maya Plays the Part	Annick Press	Finalist	
2025	Braden Hallett	Teddy vs. the Fuzzy Doom: Secrets of Ravensbarrow	Annick Press	Finalist	
