= The Mob (1975 film) =

1975 Canadian film

- French: La Gammick
- Directed by: Jacques Godbout
- Written by: Jacques Godbout; Jean-Marie Poupart; Pierre Turgeon
- Produced by: Marc Beaudet
- Starring: Marc Legault; Dorothée Berryman; Gilbert Chénier
- Cinematography: Jean-Pierre Lachapelle
- Edited by: Werner Nold
- Music by: François Dompierre
- Production company: National Film Board of Canada
- Release date: February 27, 1975
- Running time: 86 minutes
- Country: Canada
- Language: French

The Mob (French: La Gammick), also known as The Swindle, is a Canadian crime drama film, written and directed by Jacques Godbout and released in 1975. The film stars Marc Legault as François "Chico" Tremblay, a low-level enforcer in the Mafia who agrees to undertake a risky job for his boss Raoul (Gilbert Chénier) to kill rival American crime boss Frank Anastasia. Although he succeeds in the task, he is subsequently drawn into events that endanger his life, as well as the lives of his partner Gaby (Pierre Gobeil) and his girlfriend Rita (Dorothée Berryman), after Anastasia's crime network hunts Chico down in retaliation.

The cast also includes André Guy, Julien Poulin, Gilles Renaud, Donald Wilson, Denis Drouin, Serge Thériault, Jean-Pierre Saulnier, Malcolm Nelthorpe, Luc Durand, Maurice Gibeau, Rita Lafontaine, Pat Gagnon, Madeleine Arsenault, Diane Guérin, Rachel Cailhier, Jean-Denis Leduc and Don MacIntyre in supporting roles.

The film was based on a 1972 radio play that Godbout had co-written with Pierre Turgeon, which in turn was based on a real news story from the 1950s. It was released in February 1975.

The film has subsequently been identified as one of the first and most influential entries in Quebec's "polar" genre of crime thriller films. It received a retrospective screening at the 30th Fantasia International Film Festival in 2026.
