= All Nothing =

1978 film

- Tout rien
- Directed by: Frédéric Back
- Written by: Frédéric Back
- Produced by: Frédéric Back
- Edited by: Jacques Leroux
- Music by: Normand Roger
- Production company: Société Radio-Canada
- Release date: 1978
- Running time: 11 minutes
- Country: Canada

All Nothing (French: Tout rien) is a Canadian animated short film, directed by Frédéric Back and released in 1978.

== Summary ==
A portrait of human greed and avarice, the film depicts the impacts of people's drive toward acquisition and consumption on the natural environment.

== Release ==
The film was originally produced for Télévision de Radio-Canada, who broadcast it in 1978, before being released theatrically in other markets in 1980.

== Accolades ==
The film received an Academy Award nomination for Best Animated Short Film at the 53rd Academy Awards.

== See also ==
- 1978 in film
- 1980 in film
- Crac-the 1981 animated short that secured Back his first Oscar win
