= Marc Sondheimer =

Marc Sondheimer is a producer at Pixar. Best known for his work on animated short-film Piper, which earned him the Academy Award for Best Animated Short Film, shared with director Alan Barillaro.

== Filmography ==
Year	Film	Role
2004	The Incredibles	Production Finance Lead
2007	Ratatouille	Production accountant
2008	WALL-E	Sets Department Manager, Film Finance Lead
2009	Up	Administration and finance: Pixar studio team
2009	Calendar Confloption	Short, Associate Producer
2010	Day & Night	Short, Associate Producer
2012	John Carter	Production Accountant
2013	Monsters University	Studio Finance Team
2015	The Good Dinosaur	Associate Producer
2016	Finding Dory	Production Finance Lead
2016	MLI	Short, Producer
2017	Miss Fritter's Racing Skoool	Short, Producer
2017	Coco	Producer, Promotional Animation
2018	Auntie Edna	Short, Producer
2020	Lamp Life	Short, Producer
2022	Cars on the Road	Series, Producer

== Accolades ==
Award	Date of ceremony	Category	Recipient(s)	Result	Ref(s)
Academy Awards	February 26, 2017	Best Animated Short Film	Alan Barillaro and Marc Sondheimer	Won	
Annie Award	February 4, 2017	Best Animated Short Subject	Piper	Won	
Emmy Award	2018	Original Interactive Program	CocoVR	Nominated	
Cannes Lions	2018	Silver Lions	CocoVR	Won	

== See also ==
- List of Canadian Academy Award winners and nominees
- List of Pixar staff
