= Alan Barillaro =

Canadian director and animator

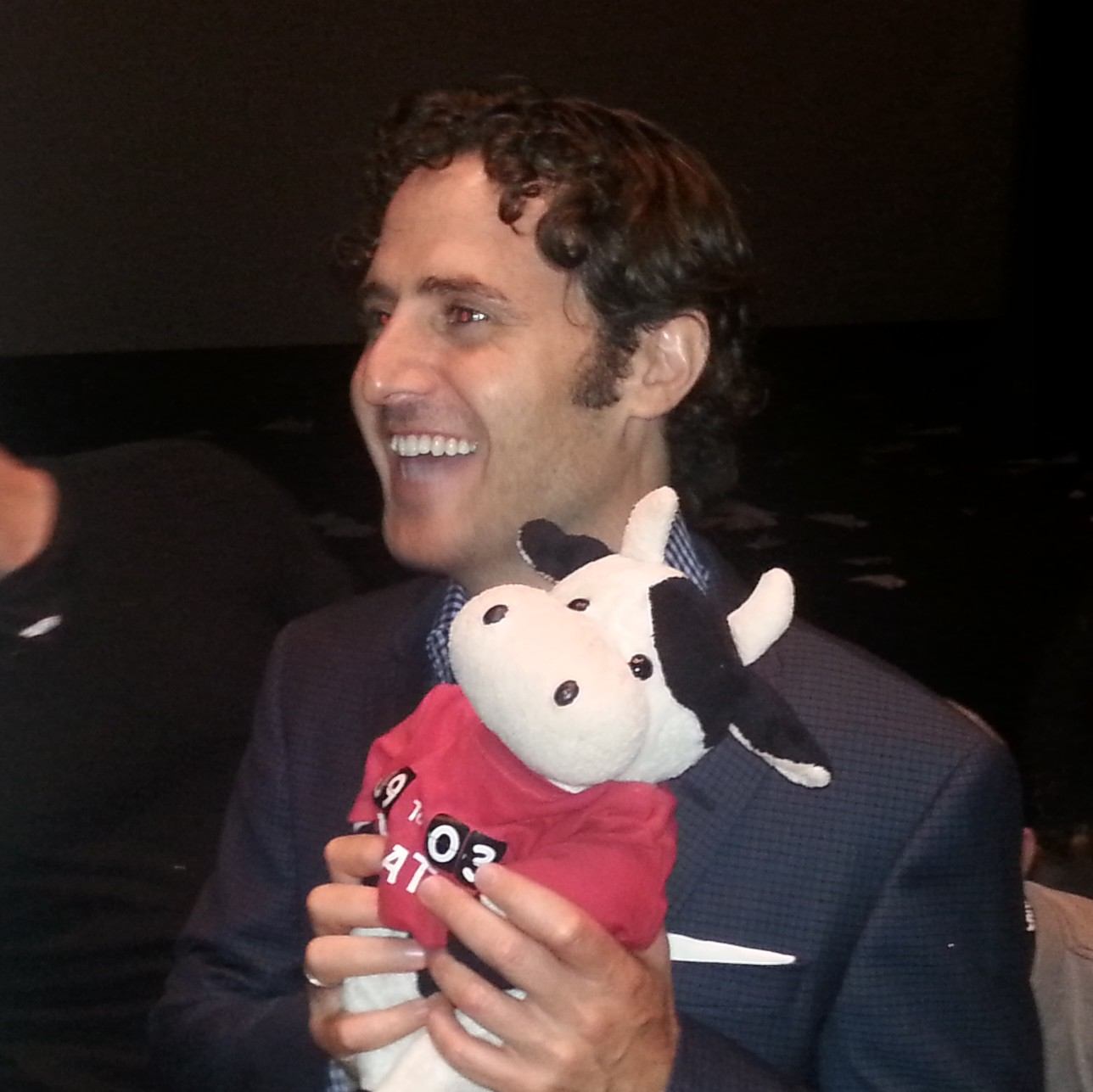
Alan Barillaro at the Annecy International Animated Film Festival in 2016

Nicolas Alan Barillaro is a Canadian director, animator and writer at Pixar best known for his work on the animated short film Piper, that earned him widespread acclaim and an Academy Award for Best Animated Short Film which he shared with the film's producer Marc Sondheimer.

Barillaro also attended Sheridan College in Oakville.

In 2023 Barillaro published the middle grade novel Where the Water Takes Us. The book was a shortlisted finalist for the Canadian Children's Book Centre's Jean Little First-Novel Award in 2024.

In 2025 Barillaro published the middle grade novel Bunns Rabbit.

== Piper ==
Alan Barillaro used new, cutting-edge technology to create the six-minute short over three years. In order to give the sanderlings and other birds visible in the background a realistic look, Barillaro and the Piper animation team visited beaches in the San Francisco Bay Area, as well as the Monterey Bay Aquarium to study their appearance and behaviour. The sanderlings' feathers in particular were rendered in minute detail.

== Filmography ==
Year	Film	Role
1998	A Bug's Life	Additional animator
1999	Toy Story 2	Animator
2001	Monsters, Inc.	Animation character developer
2003	Finding Nemo	Directing animator
2004	The Incredibles	Supervising animator
2005	Jack-Jack Attack	Video short, animator
2006	Lifted	Short, animator
2007	Ratatouille	Pixar Productions
2008	WALL-E	Supervising animator
2012	Brave	Supervising animator
2013	Monsters University	Additional animator
2016	Piper	Short, Director/writer
2018	Incredibles 2	Supervising animator
2019	Toy Story 4	Custom Animation Production
2020	Lamp Life	Short, Animator
2020	Soul	Animator
2020	Burrow	Short, Additional Animator
2021	Pixar Popcorn	Director (Chore Day - The Incredibles Way)
2022	Lightyear	Character Developer, Animator

== Accolades ==
Award	Date of ceremony	Category	Recipient(s)	Result	Ref(s)
Academy Awards	February 26, 2017	Best Animated Short Film	Alan Barillaro and Marc Sondheimer for Piper	Won	
Annie Awards	February 4, 2017	Best Animated Short Subject	Alan Barillaro and Marc Sondheimer for Piper	Won	

== See also ==
- List of Pixar staff
- List of Canadian Academy Award winners and nominees
