= Pierre Turgeon (writer) =

Canadian writer (born 1947)

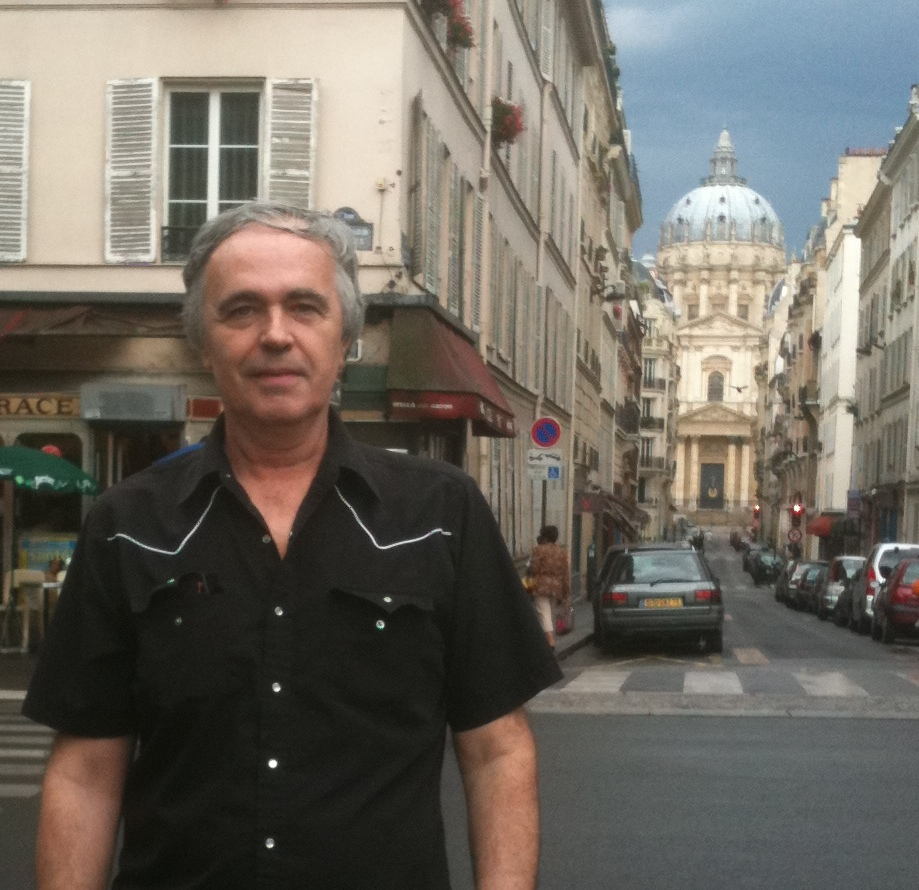
- Born: Pierre Turgeon; 9 October 1947 (age 78); Quebec City, Quebec, Canada
- Education: Collège Sainte-Marie
- Occupations: Author, novelist, literary critic, essayist, scenarist
- Honors: Governor General's Award 1981 and 1992
- Website: pierreturgeon.net/en

Pierre Turgeon (born 9 October 1947) is a Canadian novelist and essayist from Quebec.

He was a journalist and literary critic at Perspectives and Radio-Canada. He is also a co-founder of l'Illettré with Victor-Lévy Beaulieu, Jean-Marie Poupart, Jean-Claude Germain and Michel Beaulieu. He is the author 22 books and of many screenplays, including a dramatization of the October Crisis.

== Biography ==
Turgeon's family has deep roots within Quebec's history; his ancestors were among the first to settle in New France in 1662. He was born in Quebec City, Quebec and completed his studies in literature at the Collège Sainte-Marie in 1967. In 1968, he joined Radio-Canada, where he became a literary critic, signing broadcasts on foreign writers and becoming the host for Book Club, a radio weekly critical review of current literature directed by Gilles Archambault. He also pursued a career as a journalist in Perspectives. In 1969, he founded l'Illettré with Victor-Lévy Beaulieu, Jean-Marie Poupart, Jean-Claude Germain and Michel Beaulieu. In 1970, he published his first novel, Sweet Poison, which received a warm welcome by critics and the public.

In 1972, Turgeon won first prize for Dramatic Works at the CBC for The Interview, which he wrote with Jacques Godbout. This radio play served as inspiration for the feature-length movie The Mob (La Gammick) (1975), starring Marc Legault, Julien Poulin, Serge Thériault and Dorothée Berryman. In 1975, he founded Quinze Books, and was a publisher there for three years. During this period, he published many novels, including Coming Attraction and One, Two, Three. He wrote La Fleur aux dents, a movie starring Claude Jutra. The Quiet Revolution, which changed the Quebec society in the 1960s, greatly inspired Turgeon in his works during that period.

In 1970, the October Crisis was one of the key moments in Canadian history. It gave birth to the controversial film The October Crisis produced by the CBC and Radio-Canada and directed by Mark Blandford. In 1978, he became director of the press at the Université de Montréal (PUM). From 1979 to 1985, he was the manager and publisher of the Sogides Group (L'Homme, Le Jour, Quinze). In 1981, his talent as a novelist was recognized with the release of The First Person which received the Governor General's Award for French-language fiction.

In the 1980s, he published the novels A Last Blues for October and Hitler's Boat. While continuing his career as a journalist and columnist at l'Actualité, he became editor in chief of the literary review Liberté. In 1992, he received a second Governor General's Award for his essay Radissonia: The Land of the James Bay. In 1996, he found himself at the center of a political and cultural debate. The family of PH Desrosiers got a judicial ban against the biography Turgeon wrote on Maurice Duplessis. Following a fight in court for the publication of the biography, he obtained the support of more than thirty cultural, social, and trade union organizations, including UNEQ, the Writers Union of Canada, the Association of History Teachers, the Federation of Journalists, the CSN and the FTQ. L'Affaire Turgeon, as it is called, brought the repeal of Article 35 of the Civil Code of Quebec in 2002, which prohibited publishing the biography of a deceased person without the consent of his heirs.

In 1998, Turgeon published Jour de feu, at the famous French publishing house Flammarion. In 2000, he wrote the French edition of Canada: A People's History (Volumes 1 and 2), published by Fides in French and by McClelland & Stewart in its English edition by Don Gillmor.

== Honors ==
- 1972 – Prix littéraire Radio-Canada, L'Interview
- 1980 – Prix du Gouverneur général, La Première Personne
- 1992 – Prix du Gouverneur général, La Radissonie
- 1994 - The Mighty River, Le fleuve aux grandes eaux - Nominated for best animated film by Oscars and won the Los Angeles critic award for best animated film in 1994.
- 1997 – Prix Percy-Foy de la Société historique de Montréal, Les Bâtisseurs du siècle
- 2000 – Prix Ex-Libris de l'association des libraires Canadiens, Le Canada : une histoire populaire, Tome 1 et 2

== Works ==
=== Novels ===
- Sweet Poison, Oberon Press 1983.
- Un, deux, trois, Ed. du Jour 1972, Ed. Quinze 1978, Collection Bibliothèque Québécoise 1992.
- Coming soon, Ed. du Jour 1974, Ed. Quinze 1980, Vlb éditeur collection Le Courant 1989.
- The First Person, Oberon press 1981, Prix du Gouverneur général 1981, Collection 10 October 1981, Collection Bibliothèque Québécoise 1992.
- Hitler's Boat, Transit Publishing 2010,
- Un dernier blues pour octobre, Ed. Libre expression.
- Les Torrents de l'espoir, Ed. Libre expression 1995, Ed. Presses de la Cité, Paris 1996.
- Jour de feu, Ed. Flammarion 1998.

=== Essays ===
- Fréquentation, Ed. l'Hexagone, 1991
- Radissonia : The James Bay adventure, Ed. Libre expression 1991, Prix du Gouverneur général 1992

=== History books ===
- Les Bâtisseurs du siècle, Jacques Lanctôt, éditeur 1997, Prix Percy-Foy de la Société historique de Montréal.
- P.H. le magnifique : l'éminence grise de Duplessis, Jacques Lanctôt, éditeur 1997
- Canada: A People's History, Volume 1 and 2 (in collaboration with Don Gillmor), Ed. McClelland&Steward et Editions Fidès 2000. Winner of the Ex-Libris Price of The Association of Canada's Bookstores. Mention of the best book on Canada's history given by the ministry of PCanadian Heritage.

=== Notebook ===
- En Accéleré, Editions Leméac, 1991.

=== Books translated in English ===
- The First Person, Oberon Press 1980.
- Sweet Poison, Oberon Press 1982.
- Coming Attraction, Oberon Press 1983.
- Radissonia, the James Bay Adventure, Editions.Libre expression 1992.
- Canada : a People's History, volume 1 and 2, McClelland&Steward publishing. 2001.
- Hitler's boat, Transit publishing 2010

=== Theatre ===
- L'Interview, Leméac 1972 – premier prix du Concours des œuvres dramatiques de Radio-Canada

=== Screenplays ===
- 1974: La Crise d'octobre (directed by Jacques Godbout for the National Film Board)
- 1975: La Justice et l'Ordinateur (National Film Board)
- 1975: La Gammick (directed by Jacques Godbout for the National Film Board)
- 1976: The Flower Between the Teeth (La Fleur aux dents) - National Film Board
- 1992: Sur le dos de la grande baleine (National Film Board)
- 1994: Le Fleuve aux grandes eaux (Radio-Canada)
- 2000: La Révolution tranquille (4th episode, Télé-Québec)
