= David Brownlow =

American sound engineer

David Brownlow is an American sound engineer.

== Life and career ==
Brownlow is working as sound specialist for movie and TV productions since the late 1970s.

He was the sound engineer for the 1992 film Ruby. At the 47th Primetime Emmy Awards in 1995 Brownlow and his colleagues Patrick Cyccone, Edward Suski and James G. Williams where awarded with the Emmy for Outstanding Sound Mixing for a Drama Miniseries or a Special for their work on Buffalo Girls.

Brownlow and his fellow sound engineers Andy Koyama and Beau Borders are nominated for an Academy Award for Best Sound Mixing for the 2013 film Lone Survivor.
