= Andy Koyama =

Canadian re-recording mixer (born 1962)

- Born: April 18, 1962 (age 64); Toronto, Ontario, Canada
- Occupation: Re-recording sound mixer
- Years active: 1982-present

Andy Koyama (born April 18, 1962) is a Canadian re-recording mixer.

== Life ==
Koyama grew up in Toronto and attended the University of Toronto, with a major in Engineering Physics.

After college he worked as a musician and recording engineer. He then worked for 12 years at the Deluxe sound facility in Toronto, where he was responsible for mixing film and television projects. He moved to Los Angeles and worked at the Universal Studios sound department, Sony Pictures Entertainment sound department and Todd-AO before joining the Formosa Group.

Koyama and his fellow sound mixers David Brownlow and Beau Borders were nominated for an Academy Award for Best Sound Mixing for the 2013 film Lone Survivor.

Koyama was nominated for 2 CAS awards in 2013, Best sound mixing for an animated feature film "Walking With Dinosaurs", and Best sound mixing for live action feature film "Lone Survivor".

Koyama won a MPSE Golden Reel award for best sound editing for a feature film direct to video "LOVE" in 2011.
