= Frédéric Back =

Canadian animator

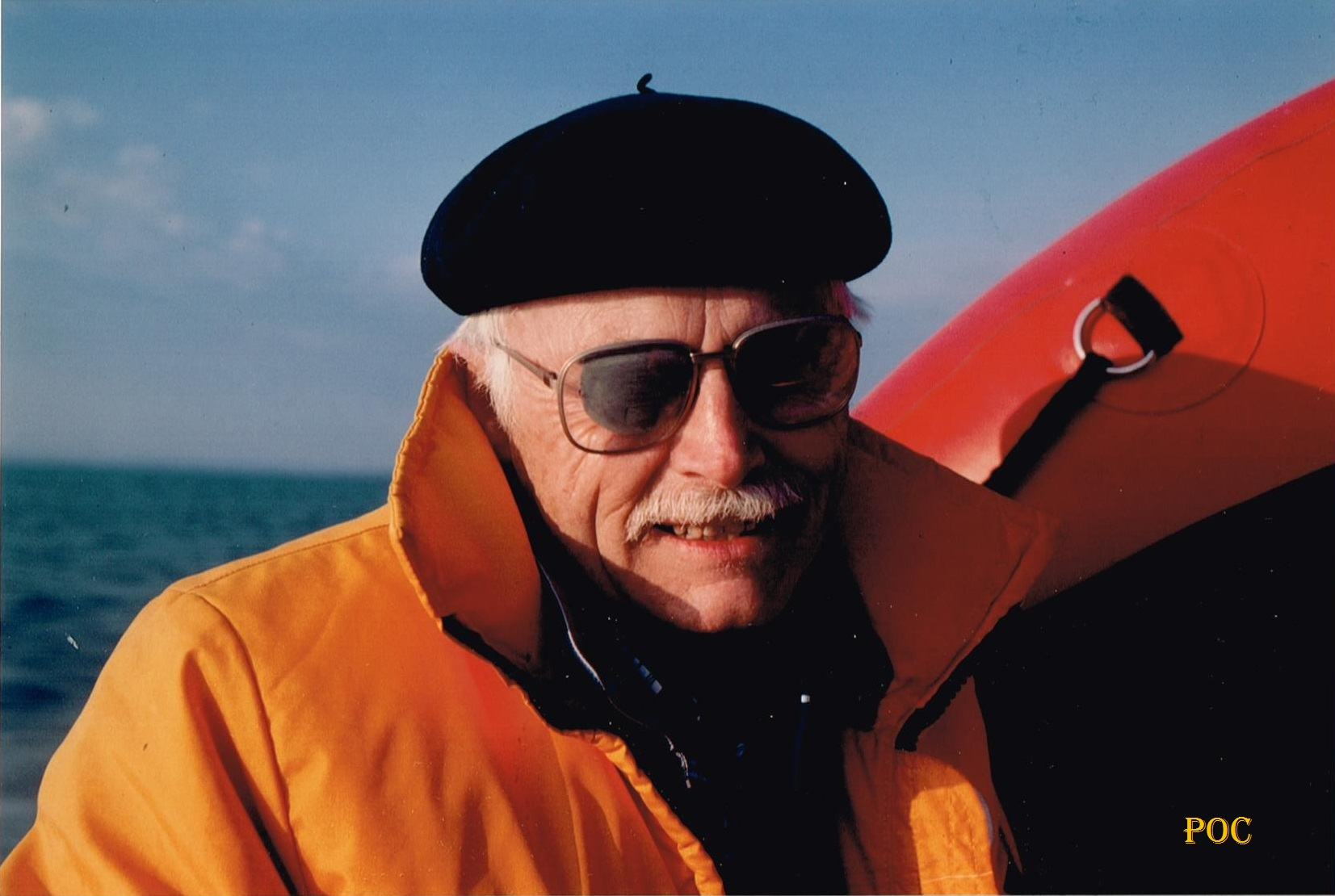
- Born: April 8, 1924; Saarbrücken, Territory of the Saar Basin (present-day Germany)
- Died: December 24, 2013 (aged 89); Montreal, Quebec, Canada
- Occupations: Animator; Illustrator; Film director Screenwriter
- Years active: 1946–1993
- Awards: Order of Canada; National Order of Quebec; Governor General's Performing Arts Award

Frédéric Back OC CQ (April 8, 1924 – December 24, 2013) was a French-Canadian artist and film director of short animated films. During a long career with Radio-Canada, the French-language service of the Canadian Broadcasting Corporation, he was nominated for four Academy Awards, winning two, for his 1981 film Crac and the 1987 film The Man Who Planted Trees.

== Biography ==
Born in Saarbrücken, The Territory of the Saar Basin, and raised in Strasbourg, Back's family moved to Paris at the start of the Second World War. Back studied art, first at the École Estienne and then at École régionale des beaux-arts de Rennes. Back's first exhibition took place at the Salon de la Marine in 1946.

Back emigrated to Canada in 1948, at the invitation of a pen pal, Ghylaine Paquin, who would become Back's wife the following year. Prior to joining the CBC, he taught at the École des beaux-arts.

In 1952, Back was hired by Radio-Canada to create titles for its television programs, and remained there the rest of his career. Back also provided artwork for Denys Arcand's 1964 National Film Board of Canada short documentary Samuel de Champlain (Québec 1603).

Back created a massive stained glass mural entitled L’histoire de la musique à Montréal ("history of music in Montreal") at the Place-des-Arts Metro station in Montreal. Unveiled on December 20, 1967, this stained glass was the first work of art to be commissioned for the Montreal metro system.

Back was nominated for a 1989 Governor General's Award in the Children's Literature – Illustration category for L'Homme qui plantait des arbres. In 1989, he was made a Knight of the National Order of Quebec. In 1990, he was made an Officer of the Order of Canada. Back was awarded a Governor General's Performing Arts Award for Lifetime Artistic Achievement, Canada's foremost distinction in the performing arts, in 1994. In 2004, he was awarded the Eco-Hero Media Award from the Planet in Focus film festival. He received a Lifetime Achievement Award at the World Festival of Animated Film - Animafest Zagreb in 2010.

Back died of cancer in Montreal on December 24, 2013.

== Animal rights ==
Back was a vegetarian and animal rights activist. He often said: "Animals are my friends and I do not eat my friends". He gave conferences on the subject and participated in demonstrations to support animal rights. Back founded "Société Québécoise pour la Défense des Animaux", a society to protect animals.

== Film work ==
In 1980, Back was nominated for an Academy Award for Animated Short Film for his film All Nothing (Tout rien). He later won two Academy Awards for Animated Short Film, for his film Crac! in 1982 and The Man Who Planted Trees (L'homme qui plantait des arbres) in 1987. In 1994, he was nominated again for an Academy Award for Animated Short Film, for his film The Mighty River (Le fleuve aux grandes eaux).

The moving image collection of Frédéric Back is held at the Academy Film Archive.

== Legacy ==
In 2017, Montréal inaugurated the large metropolitan Frédéric-Back Park, named after the artist. In 2016, Montréal elementary and high school F.A.C.E. (Fine Arts Core Education) inaugurated their North yard, transformed into an "urban forest", to be named "Forêt Frédérick-Back" in his memory.

== Sources ==
- Olivier Cotte (2007). Secrets of Oscar-winning animation: Behind the scenes of 13 classic short animations. Focal Press. ISBN 978-0-240-52070-4
