= Blowhard (film) =

- Film poster
- Directed by: Brad Caslor; Christopher Hinton
- Produced by: Jerry Krepakevich; Derek Mazur
- Narrated by: Maara Haas
- Edited by: Jerry Krepakevich
- Production company: National Film Board of Canada
- Release date: 1978
- Running time: 10 minutes
- Country: Canada
- Language: English

Blowhard is a Canadian animated short film, directed by Brad Caslor and Christopher Hinton for the National Film Board of Canada in 1978. A satire of capitalism, the film centres on a businessman who moves to Blowhard, a town populated by dragons but without electrical power, and formulates a plan to profit and become rich by exploiting the dragons as a power source.

The film was made for the NFB's Renewable Society series. It also served as a subtle comment on Western Canadian alienation, as businessman J. B. Edwards was "from the East" and the town of Blowhard was "in the West". It was narrated by Maara Haas, and also featured Wayne Finucan as the voice of J. B. Edwards.

The film received a Canadian Film Award nomination for Best Animated Short Film at the 29th Canadian Film Awards in 1978 and it won a Golden Sheaf Award for Best Animation at the Yorkton Film Festival.

It was later broadcast in the United States on Cartoon Network's O Canada anthology series of NFB animated shorts.
