= The Mighty River =

- French: Le Fleuve aux grandes eaux
- Directed by: Frédéric Back
- Written by: Frédéric Back; Hubert Fielden; Patricia Lavoie; Jean Salvy; Hubert Tison; Pierre Turgeon
- Produced by: Frédéric Back; Hubert Tison
- Narrated by: Donald Sutherland (English); Paul Hébert (French)
- Edited by: Norbert Pickering
- Music by: Denis L. Chartrand; Normand Roger
- Animation by: Frédéric Back
- Production company: Société Radio-Canada
- Release date: June 1993 (Annecy)
- Running time: 24 minutes
- Country: Canada
- Languages: English; French

The Mighty River (French: Le Fleuve aux grandes eaux) is a Canadian animated short film, directed by Frédéric Back and released in 1993.

== Summary ==
The film is a portrait of the St. Lawrence River, depicting both its natural beauty and the threats to it from human negligence of the environment. It was the last film Back worked on before Société Radio-Canada, the French division of the Canadian Broadcasting Corporation for which Back worked, closed down its animation department.

The film's English version was narrated by Donald Sutherland, and its French version was narrated by Paul Hébert.

== Release ==
It premiered at the 1993 Annecy International Animation Film Festival.

In Canada, it was distributed principally as a television special, broadcast in French by SRC Télévision and in English by CBC Television.

Back and biologist Claude Villeneuve released a book version of the film in 1995.

== Awards ==
Award	Date of ceremony	Category	Recipient(s)	Result	Ref(s)
Annecy International Animation Film Festival	1993	Grand Prix du court métrage	Frédéric Back	Won	
Los Angeles Film Critics Association	1993	Best Animation	Frédéric Back	Won	
Academy Awards	1994	Best Animated Short Film	Frédéric Back, Hubert Tison	Nominated	
Yorkton Film Festival	1994	Best of Festival	Frédéric Back, Hubert Tison	Won	
Yorkton Film Festival	1994	Golden Sheaf Award for Best Animation	Frédéric Back, Hubert Tison	Won	
Yorkton Film Festival	1994	Best Sound	Luc Boudrias, Michel Descombes	Won	
Hiroshima International Animation Festival	1994	Grand Prize	Frédéric Back	Won	
Ottawa International Animation Festival	1994	Production 10–30 minutes	Frédéric Back	Won	
