= CNote (film) =

cNote
- Directed by: Christopher Hinton
- Music by: Michael Oesterle
- Distributed by: National Film Board of Canada (NFB)
- Release date: August 2005 (Montréal World Film Festival)
- Running time: 7 minutes
- Country: Canada
- Language: English

cNote is a 2005 National Film Board of Canada animated short by Christopher Hinton, which received the Genie Award for Best Animated Short at the 26th Genie Awards. In this visual music short, Hinton animates to an original modern classical composition by Montreal-based composer Michael Oesterle.

Influenced by Futurism and Abstract expressionism, the film was computer-animated and represented a departure for Hinton, who generally used traditional animation techniques.
