= Piper (film) =

- Film poster
- Directed by: Alan Barillaro
- Written by: Alan Barillaro
- Produced by: Marc Sondheimer
- Edited by: Sarah K. Reimers
- Music by: Adrian Belew
- Production company: Pixar Animation Studios
- Distributed by: Walt Disney Studios; Motion Pictures (Note: Distributed by Walt Disney Studios Motion Pictures through the Walt Disney Pictures banner.)
- Release date: June 17, 2016 (with Finding Dory)
- Running time: 6 minutes
- Country: United States

Piper is a 2016 American animated short film produced by Pixar Animation Studios. Written and directed by Alan Barillaro, it was theatrically released alongside Pixar's Finding Dory on June 17, 2016. It won the Academy Award for Best Animated Short Film at the 89th Academy Awards, becoming the first Pixar animated short to win the award since For the Birds in 2001.

The short film involves a hungry baby sandpiper learning to overcome her fear of water. The inspiration came from less than a mile away from Pixar Studios in Emeryville, California, where Barillaro, a veteran Pixar animator, would run alongside the shore and notice birds by the thousands fleeing from the water but returning between waves to eat.

== Plot ==
A flock of sandpipers is hunting for food at a seashore by searching for bivalves exposed by receding waves and running away when the wave returns. A baby (named Piper) is taken to the shoreline by her mother so she can learn how to find her own food. However, she fails to pull away in time and is soaked wet by the incoming surf, thus terrifying her. The incident leaves Piper with aquaphobia and she refuses to leave the nest insisting on her mother feeding her like before. Soon, she is compelled to return to the shoreline by her hunger and notices a hermit crab digging in the sand. While she is watching the crab, a large wave comes in and submerges her. She panics and imitates the crabs by burrowing into the sand. However, this time the crab tells Piper to open her eyes, allowing her to see large bivalves exposed by the wave. Excited, Piper overcomes her aquaphobia and learns how to catch the large bivalves when they are exposed underwater, catching enough to feed her entire flock.

== Production ==
Alan Barillaro used new, cutting edge technology to create Piper for over three years. In order to give the sandpipers and other birds visible in the background a realistic look, Barillaro and the short animation team visited beaches in the San Francisco Bay Area, as well as the Monterey Bay Aquarium to study their appearance and behavior. The sandpipers' feathers in particular were rendered in minute detail.

== Release ==
Piper was theatrically released on June 17, 2016, before Finding Dory. It was also included on the Blu-ray and DVD releases of the latter.

== Reception ==
=== Critical response ===
On the review aggregator website Rotten Tomatoes, Piper has a 100% approval rating based on five reviews, with an average rating of 8.3/10.

Eric Kohn of IndieWire gave the short film a grade of "A−", calling it a "gripping survival story in cute, charming clothing". He praised the animation for being "incredibly lifelike" and said that Pixar had taken the medium of the short film into "uncharted new territory" with its realistic animation. Kohn also felt that while the short's plot was simple, its narrative style was similar to that of Studio Ghibli films. Writing for Insider, Kirsten Acuna also praised the animation, calling the depiction of sand and water "incredibly real".

Peter Debruge of Variety wrote that Piper was "simple as a haiku and yet stunning" and called it the "uncontestable best" of that year's nominees for the Academy Award for Best Animated Short Film. Stephanie Merry of The Washington Post called the short "one of Pixar’s strongest", while Marcy Cook of The Mary Sue opined that it was better than Finding Dory (alongside which it was released) and was worth the price of admission on its own. In 2022, Comic Book Resources ranked the short second on its list of the best short films made by Disney or Pixar.

=== Accolades ===
Award	Date of ceremony	Category	Recipient(s)	Result	Ref(s)
Academy Awards	February 26, 2017	Best Animated Short Film	Alan Barillaro and Marc Sondheimer	Won	
Annie Awards	February 4, 2017	Best Animated Short Subject	Piper	Won	
Empire Awards	March 19, 2017	Best Short Film	Piper	Nominated	

The short was also part of The Animation Showcase 2016.
