= Crac =

- Directed by: Frédéric Back
- Written by: Frédéric Back
- Produced by: Frédéric Back
- Edited by: Jacques Leroux
- Music by: Normand Roger
- Production company: Société Radio Canada
- Distributed by: The Video Project (USA)
- Release date: 1981
- Running time: 15 minutes
- Country: Canada
- Language: English

Crac is a 1981 animated short film produced, written and directed by Frédéric Back.

== Plot ==
The story follows the experiences of a rocking chair, from its creation from a tree through its time as a member of a Canadian farming family.

== Reception and legacy ==
Crac won the 1981 Academy Award for Best Animated Short Film.

It also was part of Animation Show of Shows.

Animation critic Charles Solomon named it as one of the best animated films of the 1980s.
