= Nibbles (film) =

- Directed by: Christopher Hinton
- Produced by: Ron Diamond
- Music by: Terry Joe Rodrigues
- Production company: Acme Filmworks
- Release date: 2003
- Running time: 4 minutes
- Country: Canada
- Language: English

Nibbles is a Canadian animated short film, directed by Christopher Hinton and released in 2003. The film, which Hinton made as a "quick and dirty" production for Acme Filmworks, depicts a family on a fishing trip. Voices in the film were provided by Hinton and his sons Paul and Max, with the film having been inspired by a real fishing trip the family had once taken.

The film was an Academy Award nominee for Best Animated Short Film at the 76th Academy Awards and an Annie Award nominee for Best Animated Short Subject at the 31st Annie Awards, but lost to Harvie Krumpet. It won the Jutra Award for Best Animated Short Film at the 7th Jutra Awards in 2005.
