= Christopher Hinton (animator) =

Canadian film animator and professor

- Born: 1952 (age 73–74); Galt, Ontario, Canada
- Occupations: Animator, filmmaker, professor

Christopher Hinton (born 1952 in Galt, Ontario) is a Canadian filmmaker and professor, living in Victoria, British Columbia, Canada. Hinton's films have won international awards and been twice nominated for an Academy Award for Best Animated Short Film: in 1991 for the National Film Board of Canada (NFB) animated short film Blackfly and in 2003 for his independently made short Nibbles. Hinton won a Genie Award for his 2004 short film cNote. He began freelancing for the NFB in Winnipeg in the 1970s. He has written and directed over a dozen films for The National Film Board of Canada, CBC, & Sesame Street. Recent films, Flux (NFB, 2003), cNote (NFB, 2005), Chroma Concerto (2007), and Compression (2008), explore the boundaries of narrative and abstraction and the integration of contemporary media into the moving image. He was a full-time professor in the Animation Program at Concordia University.

== Filmography ==
- Canada Vignettes: Lady Frances Simpson - 1978
- Blowhard - 1978, with Brad Caslor
- Giordano - 1985
- A Nice Day in the Country - 1988
- Blackfly - 1991
- Watching TV - 1994
- Flux - 2002
- Twang - 2002
- X-Man - 2002
- Nibbles - 2003
- cNote - 2005
