= Prix Michel-Côté =

Annual Canadian film award

The Prix Michel-Côté is an annual film award, presented by Québec Cinéma as part of its annual Prix Iris, to honour the most popular film of the year among film audiences in Quebec.

First presented in 1999 as part of the Prix Jutra, the award was known as the Billet d'or ("Golden Ticket"), and was presented to the film that had been the most successful at the box office. When the awards program was relaunched as the Prix Iris, the Billet d'or was relaunched as the Prix Public, which now sees the five top-grossing films of the year submitted to a public vote to award the film that was most liked by audiences.

Due to the COVID-19 pandemic in Canada and its effects on film distribution in 2020, the 23rd Quebec Cinema Awards in 2021 did not limit the award to only the five top-grossing films of the year, but allowed the public to vote for their favourite among all 16 Quebec films that had received any commercial screenings at all in the previous year. Ten days after the initial announcement, the organization also decided to add all of the eligible documentary films to the vote as well, bringing the total number of eligible films for the award to 29. After a first round of voting, the nominees were reduced to five, including two documentaries: Call Me Human and eventual winner The Rose Family.

In December 2023, following the death of influential Quebec actor Michel Côté, Québec Cinéma announced the award's renaming in his memory. Côté had starred in six "Billet d'or" winning films: Life After Love (La Vie après l'amour), C.R.A.Z.Y., Cruising Bar 2, Father and Guns (De père en flic), Piché: The Landing of a Man (Piché, entre ciel et terre) and Omertà.

== 1990s ==
Year	Film	Directors and producers
1999; 1st Jutra Awards	Les Boys	Louis Saia, Richard Goudreau, Jeffrey Tinnell

== 2000s ==
Year	Film	Directors and producers
2000; 2nd Jutra Awards	Les Boys II	Louis Saia, Richard Goudreau, Jeffrey Tinnell
2001; 3rd Jutra Awards	Life After Love (La Vie après l'amour)	Gabriel Pelletier, Roger Frappier, Luc Vandal
2002; 4th Jutra Awards	Les Boys III	Louis Saia, Richard Goudreau, Jeffrey Tinnell
2003; 5th Jutra Awards	Séraphin: Heart of Stone (Séraphin: un homme et son péché)	Charles Binamé, Louis Laverdière, Luc Martineau
2004; 6th Jutra Awards	Seducing Doctor Lewis (La Grande séduction)	Jean-François Pouliot, Roger Frappier, Luc Vandal
2005; 7th Jutra Awards	Happy Camper (Camping sauvage)	Guy A. Lepage, Sylvain Roy, Lyse Lafontaine, Tony Roman
2006; 8th Jutra Awards	C.R.A.Z.Y.	Jean-Marc Vallée, Pierre Even
2007; 9th Jutra Awards	Bon Cop, Bad Cop	Érik Canuel, Kevin Tierney
2008; 10th Jutra Awards	The 3 L'il Pigs (Les 3 p'tits cochons)	Patrick Huard, Pierre Gendron, Christian Larouche
2009; 11th Jutra Awards	Cruising Bar 2	Michel Côté, Robert Ménard, Claude Bonin, Claire Wojas

== 2010s ==
Year	Film	Directors and producers
2010; 12th Jutra Awards	Father and Guns (De père en flic)	Émile Gaudreault, Daniel Louis, Denise Robert
2011; 13th Jutra Awards	Piché: The Landing of a Man (Piché, entre ciel et terre)	Sylvain Archambault, André Dupuy
2012; 14th Jutra Awards	Starbuck	Ken Scott, André Rouleau
2013; 15th Jutra Awards	Omertà	Luc Dionne, Daniel Louis, Denise Robert
2014; 16th Jutra Awards	Louis Cyr (Louis Cyr, l'homme le plus fort du monde)	Daniel Roby, Caroline Héroux, Christian Larouche, Stephanie Heroux
2015; 17th Jutra Awards	Mommy	Xavier Dolan, Nancy Grant
2016; 18th Quebec Cinema Awards	Snowtime! (La Guerre des tuques 3D)	Jean-François Pouliot, Marie-Claude Beauchamp, François Brisson
2017; 19th Quebec Cinema Awards
2017; 19th Quebec Cinema Awards	1:54	Yan England, Diane England, Denise Robert
2017; 19th Quebec Cinema Awards	The 3 L'il Pigs 2 (Les 3 p'tits cochons 2)	Jean-François Pouliot, Pierre Gendron, Christian Larouche
2017; 19th Quebec Cinema Awards	Bad Seeds (Les Mauvaises Herbes)	Louis Bélanger, Lorraine Dufour, Luc Vandal
2017; 19th Quebec Cinema Awards	It's Only the End of the World (Juste la fin du monde)	Xavier Dolan, Sylvain Corbeil, Nancy Grant, Elisha Karmitz, Nathanaël Karmitz, Michel Merkt
2017; 19th Quebec Cinema Awards	Votez Bougon	Jean-François Pouliot, Fabienne Larouche, Michel Trudeau
2018; 20th Quebec Cinema Awards
2018; 20th Quebec Cinema Awards	Major Junior (Junior Majeur)	Éric Tessier, Christian Larouche
2018; 20th Quebec Cinema Awards	Ballerina	Éric Summer, Éric Warin, Laurent Zeitoun, Yann Zenou, Nicolas Duval Adassovsky, André Rouleau, Valérie d'Auteuil
2018; 20th Quebec Cinema Awards	Bon Cop, Bad Cop 2	Alain DesRochers, Pierre Even, Patrick Huard, François Flamand
2018; 20th Quebec Cinema Awards	Father and Guns 2 (De père en flic 2)	Émile Gaudreault, Denise Robert
2018; 20th Quebec Cinema Awards	Threesome (Le Trip à trois)	Nicolas Monette, Guillaume Lespérance, André Dupuy
2019; 21st Quebec Cinema Awards
2019; 21st Quebec Cinema Awards	1991	Ricardo Trogi, Nicole Robert
2019; 21st Quebec Cinema Awards	La Bolduc	François Bouvier, Valérie D'Auteuil, André Rouleau
2019; 21st Quebec Cinema Awards	The Fall of the American Empire (La Chute de l'empire américain)	Denys Arcand, Denise Robert
2019; 21st Quebec Cinema Awards	The Fireflies Are Gone (La disparition des lucioles)	Sébastien Pilote, Marc Daigle, Bernadette Payeur
2019; 21st Quebec Cinema Awards	Racetime (La Course des tuques)	Benoît Godbout, Marie-Claude Beauchamp, François Brisson

== 2020s ==
Year	Film	Directors and producers	Ref
2020; 22nd Quebec Cinema Awards
2020; 22nd Quebec Cinema Awards	And the Birds Rained Down (Il pleuvait des oiseaux)	Louise Archambault, Ginette Petit	
2020; 22nd Quebec Cinema Awards	A Brother's Love (La femme de mon frère)	Monia Chokri, Sylvain Corbeil, Nancy Grant	
2020; 22nd Quebec Cinema Awards	Compulsive Liar (Menteur)	Émile Gaudreault, Denise Robert	
2020; 22nd Quebec Cinema Awards	Mafia Inc.	Daniel Grou, Antonello Cozzolino, Valérie d'Auteuil, André Rouleau	
2020; 22nd Quebec Cinema Awards	Thanks for Everything (Merci pour tout)	Louise Archambault, André Dupuy	
2021; 23rd Quebec Cinema Awards
2021; 23rd Quebec Cinema Awards	The Rose Family (Les Rose)	Félix Rose, Marco Frascarelli, Colette Loumède, Philippe-A. Allard, Eric Piccoli	
2021; 23rd Quebec Cinema Awards	Call Me Human (Je m'appelle humain)	Kim O'Bomsawin, Andrée-Anne Frenette	
2021; 23rd Quebec Cinema Awards	The Decline (Jusqu'au déclin)	Patrice Laliberté, Julie Groleau, Nicolas Krief, Charles Dionne	
2021; 23rd Quebec Cinema Awards	Goddess of the Fireflies (La déesse des mouches à feu)	Anaïs Barbeau-Lavalette, Luc Vandal, Catherine Léger	
2021; 23rd Quebec Cinema Awards	The Vinland Club (Le Club Vinland)	Benoît Pilon, Chantal Lafleur, Normand Bergeron, Marc Robitaille	
2022; 24th Quebec Cinema Awards
2022; 24th Quebec Cinema Awards	Sam	Diane England, Denise Robert, Yan England, André Gulluni	
2022; 24th Quebec Cinema Awards	Drunken Birds (Les oiseaux ivres)	Luc Déry, Kim McCraw, Sara Mishara, Ivan Grbovic	
2022; 24th Quebec Cinema Awards	Goodbye Happiness (Au revoir le bonheur)	Christian Larouche, Ken Scott	
2022; 24th Quebec Cinema Awards	The Guide to the Perfect Family (La guide de la famille parfaite)	Louis Morissette, Félize Frappier, Louis-Philippe Drolet, Ricardo Trogi, François Avard, Jean-François Léger	
2022; 24th Quebec Cinema Awards	Maria	Nathalie Brigitte Bustos, Alec Provonost, Mariana Mazza, Justine Phillie	
2022; 24th Quebec Cinema Awards	Maria Chapdelaine	Pierre Even, Sylvain Proulx, Sébastien Pilote	
2022; 24th Quebec Cinema Awards	Old Buddies (Les vieux chums)	Samuel Gagnon, Claude Gagnon, Bahija Essoussi, Yuri Yoshimura-Gagnon	
2022; 24th Quebec Cinema Awards	The Perfect Victim (La victime parfaite)	Denise Robert, Monic Néron, Émilie Perreault	
2022; 24th Quebec Cinema Awards	A Revision (Une révision)	Denise Robert, Catherine Therrien, Louis Godbout, Normand Corbeil	
2022; 24th Quebec Cinema Awards	The Time Thief (L'arracheuse de temps)	Antonello Cozzolino, Francis Leclerc, Fred Pellerin	
2023; 25th Quebec Cinema Awards
2023; 25th Quebec Cinema Awards	My Mother's Men (Les hommes de ma mère)	Patrick Roy, Patrick Huard, Anik Jean, Maryse Latendresse	
2023; 25th Quebec Cinema Awards	Confessions of a Hitman (Confessions)	Christian Larouche, Sébastien Létourneau, Luc Picard, Sylvain Guy	
2023; 25th Quebec Cinema Awards	Katak: The Brave Beluga (Katak, le brave béluga)	Nancy Florence Savard, Christine Dallaire-Dupont, Nicola Lemay, Andrée Lambert, Xiaojuan Zhou, Chantale Pagé	
2023; 25th Quebec Cinema Awards	One Summer (Le temps d'un été)	Patrick Roy, Antonello Cozzolino, Brigitte Léveillé, Louise Archambault, Marie Vien	
2023; 25th Quebec Cinema Awards	Two Days Before Christmas (23 décembre)	Patrick Roy, Guillaume Lespérance, Miryam Bouchard, India Desjardins	
2024; 26th Quebec Cinema Awards
2024; 26th Quebec Cinema Awards	Sisters and Neighbors! (Nos belles-sœurs)	Yoann Sauvageau, Denise Robert, René Richard Cyr	
2024; 26th Quebec Cinema Awards	1995	Patrick Roy, Marie-Claude Poulin, Ricardo Trogi	
2024; 26th Quebec Cinema Awards	The Nature of Love (Simple comme Sylvain)	Patrick Roy, Monia Chokri, Sylvain Corbeil, Nancy Grant, Elisha Karmitz, Nathanaël Karmitz	
2024; 26th Quebec Cinema Awards	Ru	Patrick Roy, Marie-Alexandra Forget, André Dupuy, Charles-Olivier Michaud, Jacques Davidts	
2024; 26th Quebec Cinema Awards	Testament	Yoann Sauvageau, Denise Robert, Denys Arcand	
2025; 27th Quebec Cinema Awards
2025; 27th Quebec Cinema Awards	A Christmas Storm (Le Cyclone de Noël)	Alain Chicoine, Mia Desroches, Christian Larouche, Sébastien Létourneau, Louis-Philippe Drolet, Louis Morissette, Mélanie Viau, Dominic Anctil, Marie-Élène Grégoire, Louis-Philippe Rivard	
2025; 27th Quebec Cinema Awards	Blue Sky Jo (La petite et le vieux)	Sonia Despars, Marc Biron, Yoann Sauvageau, Patrice Sauvé, Sébastien Girard	
2025; 27th Quebec Cinema Awards	Compulsive Liar 2 (Menteuse)	Patrick Roy, André Dupuy, Marie-Alexandra Forget, Émile Gaudreault, Eric K. Boulianne, Sébastien Ravary	
2025; 27th Quebec Cinema Awards	Miss Boots (Mlle Bottine)	Antonello Cozzolino, Brigitte Léveillé, Dominic James, Patrick Roy, Yan Lanouette Turgeon	
2025; 27th Quebec Cinema Awards	Shepherds (Bergers)	Luc Déry, Kim McCraw, Élaine Hébert, Caroline Bonmarchand, Xenia Sulyma, Chantal Pagé, Sophie Deraspe, Mathyas Lefebure	

== Multiple wins and nominations ==
=== Multiple wins ===
Wins	Filmmakers
5	Denise Robert
3	Richard Goudreau
3	Christian Larouche
3	Louis Saia
3	Jeffrey Tinnell
2	Diane England
2	Yan England
2	Roger Frappier
2	Patrick Huard
2	Daniel Louis
2	Jean-François Pouliot
2	Luc Vandal

=== Three or more nominations ===
Not including the awards prior to the 19th Quebec Cinema Awards:

Nominations	Filmmakers
9	Denise Robert
8	Patrick Roy
5	Christian Larouche
4	Antonello Cozzolino
4	André Dupuy
3	Louise Archambault
3	Sylvain Corbeil
3	Valérie d'Auteuil
3	Émile Gaudreault
3	Nancy Grant
3	André Rouleau
3	Yoann Sauvageau
3	Ricardo Trogi

== See also ==
- Golden Screen Award
