= Compulsive Liar =

2019 Canadian comedy film

- Film poster
- French: Menteur
- Directed by: Émile Gaudreault
- Written by: Eric K. Boulianne; Émile Gaudreault
- Produced by: Denise Robert
- Starring: Louis-José Houde; Antoine Bertrand; Véronique Le Flaguais
- Cinematography: Steve Asselin
- Edited by: Arthur Tarnowski
- Music by: FM Le Sieur
- Production company: Cinémaginaire
- Distributed by: Les Films Séville
- Release date: July 10, 2019
- Running time: 111 minutes
- Country: Canada
- Language: French

Compulsive Liar (French: Menteur) is a Canadian comedy film, directed by Émile Gaudreault and released in 2019. The film stars Louis-José Houde as Simon, a man who is confronted by his family about his lifelong habit of being a compulsive liar, and denies it; but he then wakes up the next day in an alternate reality in which all of his past lies have become the truth, forcing him to correct all of his lies with the help of his brother Phil (Antoine Bertrand) in order to reset everything back to normal.

The cast also includes Véronique Le Flaguais, Anne-Élisabeth Bossé, Geneviève Schmidt, Catherine Chabot, Denise Filiatrault, Johanne-Marie Tremblay, Luc Senay and Sonia Vachon.

== Reception ==
The film premiered in theatres on July 10, 2019, and had the biggest opening weekend for a Québécois film in 2019. As of the week of August 15 it had surpassed $5 million at the box office, and had already reached the status of Quebec's 13th highest-grossing film of all time.

The film ended 2019 as the year's top-grossing Canadian film, and received the Golden Screen Award at the 8th Canadian Screen Awards.

It received three Prix Iris nominations at the 22nd Quebec Cinema Awards in 2020, for Best Supporting Actress (Schmidt), Revelation of the Year (Chabot) and the Public Prize.

== Sequel ==
In April 2024, Gaudreault announced the launch of production on a sequel centred on Virginie, Bossé's character in the original film. Houde did not return as Simon, due to a decision to take some time off from film following the birth of his son in 2023, but Bertrand, Chabot, Senay and Le Flaguais all returned for the sequel, with new cast additions including Pierrette Robitaille and Rémy Girard.

The sequel, Compulsive Liar 2 (Menteuse), was released in 2025.

== Remake ==
In November 2025, an American remake was announced at Amazon MGM Studios. It will be written by Emily V. Gordon and Kumail Nanjiani, with the latter also starring.
