= Compulsive Liar 2 =

2025 Canadian comedy film

- French: Menteuse
- Directed by: Émile Gaudreault
- Written by: Eric K. Boulianne; Émile Gaudreault
- Produced by: André Dupuy; Émile Gaudreault
- Starring: Anne-Élisabeth Bossé; Antoine Bertrand; Véronique Le Flaguais
- Cinematography: Jean-François Lord
- Edited by: Arthur Tarnowski
- Music by: FM Le Sieur
- Production company: Amalga Créations
- Distributed by: Immina Films
- Release date: July 9, 2025
- Running time: 102 minutes
- Country: Canada
- Language: French

Compulsive Liar 2 (French: Menteuse) is a Canadian comedy film, directed by Émile Gaudreault and released in 2025.

A sequel to the 2019 film Compulsive Liar (Menteur), the film stars Anne-Élisabeth Bossé as Virginie Gauthier, a woman who frequently tells little white lies to preserve social peace and avoid hurting the feelings of the people in her life, but wakes up one day in a world where all of her lies have suddenly become the truth; she thus faces the challenge of fixing things with the help of her partner Phil (Antoine Bertrand), who luckily knows what to do because he went through it all before with his brother a few years ago.

The cast also includes Véronique Le Flaguais, Catherine Chabot, Pierrette Robitaille, Luc Senay and Rémy Girard.

The film opened theatrically on July 9, 2025.

== Sequel ==
Gaudreault announced the launch of production on the film in April 2024.

Louis-José Houde, who played the central character in the original, did not return for the sequel due to his decision to take some time off from film following the birth of his son in 2023. Bossé, Bertrand, Chabot, Senay and Le Flaguais all returned for the sequel, with new cast additions including Robitaille and Girard.

== Distribution ==
The film surpassed the $1 million benchmark for box office success in the Quebec market within two weeks of its release, and reached the $2 million mark by August 1.

The film was the winner of the Golden Screen Award as the top-grossing Canadian film of the year at the 14th Canadian Screen Awards in 2026.
