= Diane Lavallée =

Canadian actress

Diane Lavallée (born November 30, 1955) is a Canadian film and television actress from Montreal, Quebec. She is most noted for her performance as Sister Lise in the 2015 film The Passion of Augustine (La Passion d'Augustine), for which she won the Prix Iris for Best Supporting Actress at the 18th Quebec Cinema Awards in 2016.

She was previously nominated in the same category at the 8th Jutra Awards in 2006 for her role as Alice Norchet in The Rocket (Maurice Richard).

From her prior marriage to actor Marcel Leboeuf, she is the mother of actress Laurence Leboeuf.

== Filmography ==
=== Film ===
Year	Title	Role	Notes
1987	Brother André (Le Frère André)		
1996	Karmina	Linda Chabot	
1999	Winter Stories (Histoires d'hiver)	Jacqueline Roy	
2000	Pandora's Beauty (La Beauté de Pandore)		
2001	Wedding Night (Nuit de noces)	Geneviève	
2001	Karmina 2 (Karmina 2, L'Enfer de Chabot)	Linda Chabot	
2003	8:17 p.m. Darling Street (20h17 rue Darling)	Chantal	
2003	Mambo Italiano	Mélanie	
2004	The Five of Us (Elles étaient cinq)	Brigitte	
2005	The Rocket (Maurice Richard)	Alice Norchet	
2005	J'te laisserai pas tomber		
2005	Instant Idol (Idole instantanée)	Geneviève	
2007	Super Phoenix	Madame Laruche	
2008	Honey, I'm in Love (Le Grand Départ)	Pauline	
2009	A Happy Man (Le Bonheur de Pierre)	Pauline	
2010	2 Frogs in the West (2 frogs dans l'ouest)	Gisèle Deschamps	
2011	French Immersion	Ghislaine	
2011	A Sense of Humour (Le Sens de l'humour)	Geneviève	
2012	Le Trou-Normand	Carmen	
2015	The Passion of Augustine (La Passion d'Augustine)	Sister Lise	
2016	9	Bank director	
2017	Father and Guns 2 (De père en flic 2)	Geneviève	
2019	Ghost Town Anthology (Répertoire des villes disparues)	Simone Smallwood	
2021	Maria	Manon	
2021	Babatoura	Johanne	
2022	Her Home (Chez elle)	Alice	
2024	Sisters and Neighbors! (Nos belles-sœurs)	Angéline Sauvé	

=== Television ===
Year	Title	Role	Notes
1976	Grand-Papa	Catherine Lamontagne	
1979	Pop Citrouille		
1983	Aïrenem	Aïrenem	
1984	À plein temps		
1985	L'agent fait le bonheur	Linda Pinsonneault	
1989	CTYVON		
1989	Samedi P.M.		
1992	Le monde merveilleux de Ding et Dong		
1992–1995	Bye Bye		
1993	L'Amour avec un grand A	Julie	Episode "C'est la faute à Barbie"
1993	Au nom du père et du fils	Azalée Gadouas	
1993–2023	La Petite Vie	Thérèse Paré	
1996–2001	Virginie	Justine Dansereau	
1999	Deux frères	Dominique Lazure	
2001	La Vie, la vie	Ariane Raymond	
2001	L'Enfant de la télé	Madeleine	
2002	Max Inc.	Barbara Bigras	
2002	Caméra Café	Wife of Normand	
2003	C'était ça le burlesque		
2005	Détect.inc.	Madonna	
2006	Kif-Kif	Denise	
2007–2011	Les Boys	Claude Lapierre	
2008	Casino II	Ursule	
2008–2010	Roxy	Johanne	
2010	VRAK la vie	Constance	
2011	30 vies	Marjorie	
2015	Mon ex à moi	Murielle Tremblay	
2016	Boomerang	Sylvie	
2016	Web Thérapie	Marie-Reine Roy	
2019	Les Invisibles	Herself	
2021–2023	Sans rendez-vous	Marianne	
2024	Complètement Lycée	Guylaine Maxwell	
