= Caroline Dhavernas =

Canadian actress

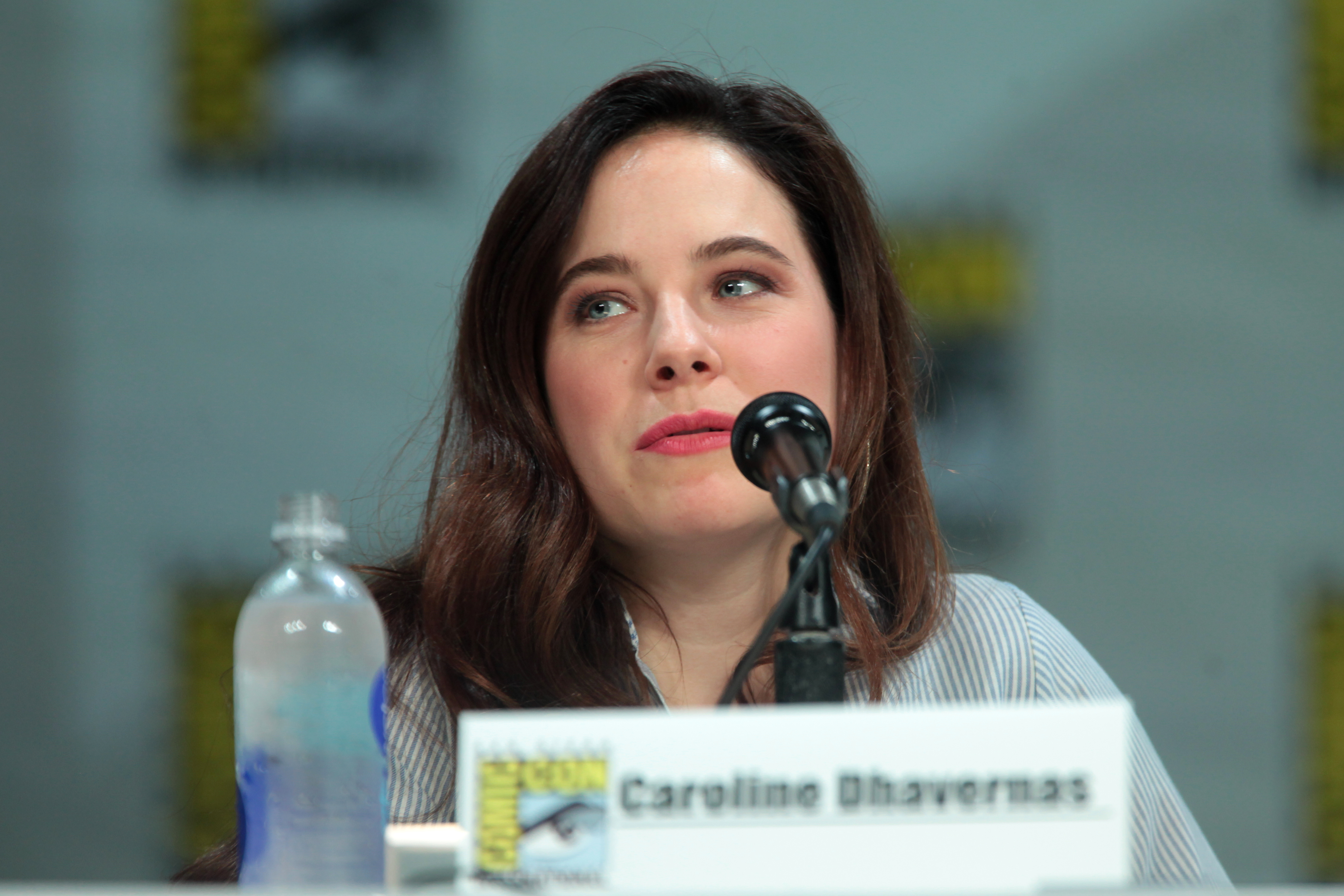
- Dhavernas at the 2014 San Diego Comic Con
- Born: 1978 (age 47–48); Montreal, Quebec, Canada
- Occupation: Actress
- Years active: 1987–present
- Partner(s): Maxime Le Flaguais (2016–present)
- Children: Françoise Côté
- Parents: Sébastien Dhavernas (father); Michèle Deslauriers (mother)
- Relatives: Gabrielle Dhavernas (sister)

Caroline Dhavernas (/ˈkærəlin dəˈvɜːrnə/ CARA-leen də-VURR-na) (born 1978) is a Canadian actress. In the United States, her best known work has been her collaborations with Bryan Fuller. She played Jaye Tyler in the Fox comedy-drama series Wonderfalls, and Alana Bloom in the NBC psychological horror drama series Hannibal.

She also starred as Lily Brenner in the ABC medical drama Off the Map. From 2017 to 2019, she portrayed the titular character in the Canada-produced and Canadian- and American-distributed medical drama-black comedy Mary Kills People.

== Early life ==
Dhavernas was born in Montreal, Quebec, the daughter of the Québécois actors Sébastien Dhavernas and Michèle Deslauriers. Her sister Gabrielle Dhavernas is also an actress and specializes in dubbing. The vocal timbre of both actresses is similar, enabling Gabrielle to dub the voice of Caroline. She learned English at a very young age, as her parents sent her to an English-speaking elementary school called The Priory School.

== Career ==
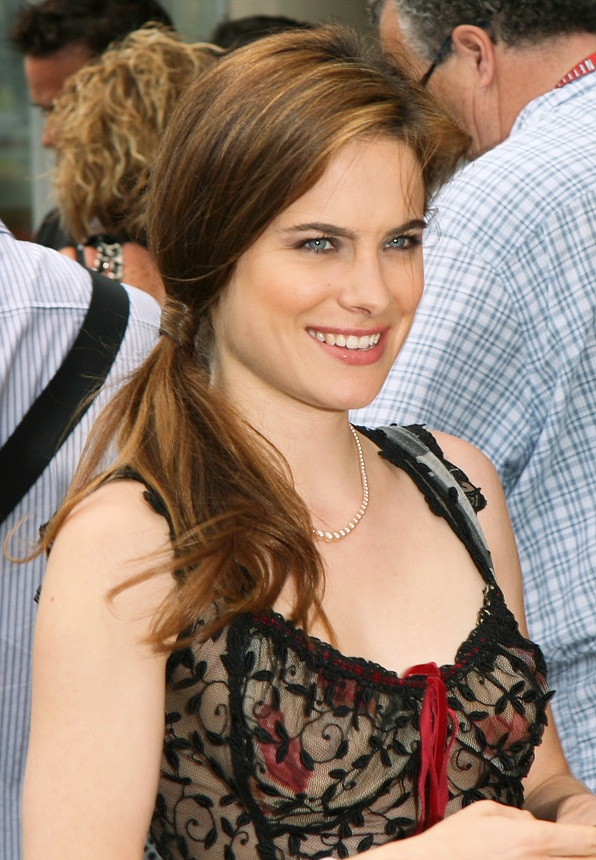
Dhavernas at the 2008 Toronto International Film Festival.

She began her career at the age of 8, dubbing voices for television productions such as Babar. At the age of 12 she began her acting career in the film Comme un Voleur (1990). In 1990 she also played a magic wizard fairy in the children's musical film The Magic Dragon Tales. In 1992, she had a small role in Black Beauty. In 1996, she played the main role of a mermaid princess in the romantic drama Summer's Colors.

Dhavernas portrayed swimmer Marilyn Bell in the television film Heart: The Marilyn Bell Story (1999). She trained for two months with the Pointe-Claire Swim Club to convincingly portray Bell, who was the first to cross 32-mile Lake Ontario in 1954. Other notable films have included a leading role in Edge of Madness (2002), and supporting roles in Out Cold (2001) and Lost and Delirious (2001). She also had a notable role on Law & Order as a closeted, gay teenager who killed her girlfriend in the episode "Girl Most Likely" (season 12, episode 17).

Dhavernas portrayed Jaye Tyler, the central character in Wonderfalls, which debuted on US television in March 2004. Jaye is an over-educated underachiever from a wealthy family who lives in a trailer park and works at the Wonderfalls Gift Emporium, a Niagara Falls gift shop. The show's premise is that Jaye is spoken to by inanimate objects, which encourage her to help others. Dhavernas has described the show as being like "Touched by an Angel on acid". The show received widespread critical praise, but was cancelled after only four episodes aired. Millions of fans signed an online petition with the hope that Fox would continue the show, and as a result 20th Century Fox released a DVD set ith all 13 completed episodes. Dhavernas did her own voice-overs for the French translation of Wonderfalls.

Since the cancellation of Wonderfalls, Dhavernas has continued to appear in Canadian-made features in 2004, such as Niagara Motel and These Girls. In early 2006, she played Isabella Marie in The Beautiful Beast and the follow-up The Diary Of Isabella. She also appeared in Black Sheep, produced by Jonathan King and directed by Eli Roth, as Nikki, Hollywoodland (2006) as Barbara, and Juliana O'Neill, the wife of Eric O'Neill, on Breach (2007).

Dhavernas also took the lead role in Surviving My Mother (which went under the working title of The Yellow Woman), a film directed by Émile Gaudreault which premiered at the Festival des films du monde of Montreal on August 28, 2007. In 2008, Dhavernas starred in Passchendaele, a film written and directed by Paul Gross about the Battle of Passchendaele. Passchendaele accounted for half of 2008's box office revenue from made-in-Canada anglophone films and as of 2009 is the most expensive film in Canadian history.

Other projects include The Cry of the Owl, a film adaptation of Patricia Highsmith's novel of the same name, and the popular Quebec comedy Father and Guns (De père en flic). In 2009, she played Bethany in the romance action drama In Heat. She also appeared in the first and last episodes of HBO's miniseries The Pacific, produced by Steven Spielberg and Tom Hanks, and a guest role on Law & Order: Criminal Intent, where she played Maya in the episode "Love Sick" in May 2010.

In 2012, audiences saw her in Martin Villeneuve's Mars et Avril, a science fiction film based on the graphic novels of the same name.

In 2013, she was cast as Alana Bloom, the female lead in Hannibal, reuniting her with Wonderfalls creator Bryan Fuller.

Dhavernas starred in the Canadian black comedy-drama medical thriller Mary Kills People, which premiered on Global on January 25, 2017. The series premiered in the U.S. on April 23 on the Lifetime U.S. basic cable network. Season 2 debuted on Global on January 3, 2018, and also on Lifetime on March 13. Each season consisted of six episodes on both Global and Lifetime. Lifetime did not air the third and final season when the network announced in December 2018. The series concluded in 2019.

She also voiced the narrator in the video game from Ubisoft titled Child of Light.

In November 2021, CDPQ Infra announced that Dhavernas was selected to become the official voice announcer of the Réseau express métropolitain, following in the footsteps of her mother, Michèle Deslauriers, who has been the voice of the Montreal Metro since 2003.

== Personal life ==
Dhavernas has been in a relationship with actor Maxime Le Flaguais since 2016. In September 2018, she gave birth to their daughter, Françoise.

== Filmography ==
=== Film ===
Year	Title	Role	Notes
1993	Cap Tourmente	Valerie Huot	
1996	L'oreille de Joé		Short film
1999	Sable Island (L'Île de Sable)	Manou	
1999	Running Home	Jessica	
2001	Lost and Delirious	Kara	
2001	Heart: The Marilyn Bell Story	Marilyn Bell	
2001	Out Cold	Anna	
2002	Les moutons de Jacob	Caroline	
2002	Edge of Madness	Annie Herron	
2002	The Baroness and the Pig	Emily	
2003	The Tulse Luper Suitcases, Part 1: The Moab Story	Passion Hockmeister	
2003	The Tulse Looper Suitcases: Antwerp	Passion Hockmeister	
2003	Red Nose (Nez rouge)	Nathalie Lachance	
2005	These Girls	Keira St. George	
2005	Niagara Motel	Loretta	Nominated—Genie Award for Best Performance by an Actress in a Supporting Role
2006	Mr. Average	Claire	
2006	Hollywoodland	Kit Holliday	
2006	The Beautiful Beast (La Belle bête)	Isabelle-Marie	Nominated—Genie Award for Best Achievement in Music - Original Song
2007	Breach	Juliana O'Neill	
2007	Surviving My Mother	Bianca	
2008	Passchendaele	Sarah Mann	
2009	The Cry of the Owl	Nickie Grace	
2009	Father and Guns	Geneviève	
2010	One Last Dance	Young Norma	Short film
2010	The Switch	Pauline	
2010	Devil	Elsa Nahai	
2010	Wrecked	Woman	
2012	Mars et Avril	Avril	
2013	Goodbye World	Becky	
2014	Le vrai du faux	Isabelle Lauzon	
2015	The Forbidden Room	Gong	
2016	Wild Run: The Legend (Chasse-Galerie: La Légende)	Liza Gilbert	
2016	Blind Vaysha	English and French-language narration	animated short film
2017	Easy Living	Sherry Graham	
2017	Father and Guns 2	Geneviève	
2017	Hochelaga, Land of Souls	Chef d'antenne	
2021	See You Garbage! (Au plaisir les ordures!)	The First Lady	
2024	Oh, Canada	Rene	
2025	Best Boy	Philip	

=== Television ===
Year	Title	Role	Notes
1990	Les filles de Caleb	Rose Pronovost age 8–11	Episode: "17"
1991	Marilyn	Abeille	unknown episodes
1993	Zap	Isabelle Daigneault	Main cast
1996	Urgence	Josianne Villeneuve	2 episodes
1997–2000	Freaky Stories	Narrator	French version
1998	Réseaux	Christine	unknown episodes
1999	Le polock	Camille Langlois	TV movie
2000	Tag	Stéphanie	4 episodes
2000	The Secret Adventures of Jules Verne	Angelique Dore	Episode: "The Golem"
2002	Law & Order	Alicia Milford	Episode: "Girl Most Likely"
2004	Wonderfalls	Jaye Tyler	Main cast
2010	Law & Order: Criminal Intent	Maya Sills	Episode: "Love Sick"
2010	The Pacific	Vera Keller	Miniseries, 2 episodes
2011	Over/Under	Vicky Harmon-Castle	TV movie
2011	Off the Map	Lily Brenner	Main cast
2013–15	Hannibal	Alana Bloom	Main cast Nominated — Saturn Award for Best Supporting Actress on Television (2015); Nominated — Fangoria Chainsaw Award for Best Actress on Television; Nominated — Golden Maple Award for Best Actress in a TV series broadcast in the U.S. (2015)
2016	Blue Moon	Chloé Vincent	Main cast
2017–19	Mary Kills People	Mary Harris	Title role
2022	Aller Simple	Julie Sicotte	Main cast

=== Video game ===
Year	Title	Role
2014	Child of Light	Narrator (voice)
2021	Assassin's Creed Valhalla - The Siege of Paris	Theodrate (voice)
2025	The Outlast Trials	Amelia Collier(voice)
