= Surviving My Mother =

- Comment survivre à sa mère
- Directed by: Émile Gaudreault
- Written by: Steve Galluccio
- Produced by: Daniel Louis; Denise Robert
- Starring: Ellen David; Véronique Le Flaguais; Caroline Dhavernas; Colin Mochrie
- Cinematography: Pierre Mignot
- Edited by: Richard Comeau
- Music by: FM Le Sieur
- Distributed by: Alliance Atlantis Vivafilm
- Release date: November 2, 2007
- Running time: 95 minutes
- Country: Canada
- Language: French

Surviving My Mother (French: Comment survivre à sa mère) is a 2007 Canadian comedy-drama film.

== Plot ==
Clara's mother (Véronique Le Flaguais) is on her deathbed as she tells her daughter (Ellen David) that she regrets they are not closer. This revelation causes Clara to pursue a closer relationship with her own daughter, Bianca (Caroline Dhavernas).

== Recognition ==
- Genie Award for Best Performance by an Actress in a Supporting Role - Véronique Le Flaguais - nominee
