= Lines of Escape =

- French: Lignes de fuite
- Directed by: Miryam Bouchard; Catherine Chabot
- Written by: Catherine Chabot; Émile Gaudreault
- Based on: Lignes de fuite by Catherine Chabot
- Produced by: Denise Robert; Émile Gaudreault
- Starring: Catherine Chabot; Léane Labrèche-Dor; Mariana Mazza
- Cinematography: Stéphanie Anne Weber Biron
- Edited by: Arthur Tarnowski
- Production company: Cinémaginaire
- Distributed by: Les Films Séville les Films du lac
- Release date: July 6, 2022
- Running time: 95 min
- Country: Canada
- Language: French

Lines of Escape (French: Lignes de fuite) is a Canadian comedy-drama film, directed by Miryam Bouchard and Catherine Chabot and released in 2022. Adapted from Chabot's stage play, the film centres on Audrey (Chabot), Valérie (Léane Labrèche-Dor) and Sabina (Mariana Mazza), three high school friends who are having a reunion party at age 30, only to find their bond tested by the ways in which they have grown apart, becoming radically different from each other in their lives and values, in adulthood.

The cast also includes Maxime de Cotret as Audrey's boyfriend Jonathan, Mickaël Gouin as Valérie's boyfriend Paul-Émile and Victoria Diamond as Sabina's girlfriend Amber, as well as Antoine Vézina, Marc Auger-Gosselin, Thierry Bellevue, Stéphanie Bélanger, David Cloutier, David Corriveau, Robert Di Loreto, Isabel Dos Santos, Hugo Giroux and Nora Guerch in supporting roles.

The film opened in theatres on July 6, 2022. It was the last film ever theatrically distributed by Les Films Séville before its shutdown.

Jean-François Ferland, Marie-Claude Lafontaine and Charles Lamoureux received a Canadian Screen Award nomination for Best Visual Effects at the 11th Canadian Screen Awards in 2023.
