= Sisters and Neighbors! =

2024 Canadian comedy film

- French: Nos belles-sœurs
- Directed by: René Richard Cyr
- Written by: René Richard Cyr; Michel Tremblay
- Based on: Les Belles-sœurs by Michel Tremblay
- Produced by: Denise Robert
- Starring: Geneviève Schmidt; Guylaine Tremblay; Anne-Élisabeth Bossé; Ariane Moffatt
- Cinematography: Yves Bélanger
- Edited by: Arthur Tarnowski
- Music by: Daniel Bélanger
- Production company: Cinémaginaire
- Distributed by: TVA Films
- Release date: July 8, 2024
- Running time: 105 minutes
- Country: Canada
- Language: French

Sisters and Neighbors! (French: Nos belles-sœurs) is a Canadian musical comedy film, directed by René Richard Cyr and released in 2024. Adapted from Michel Tremblay's influential stage play Les Belles-sœurs, the film stars Geneviève Schmidt as Germaine Lauzon, a 1960s housewife in the Le Plateau-Mont-Royal district of Montreal who wins a million trading stamps in a sweepstakes; needing to paste them all into booklets to exchange for prizes, she invites many of her family and friends over for a "stamping party", only to face the petty jealousies of many of the participants.

The supporting cast includes Guylaine Tremblay, Anne-Élisabeth Bossé, Ariane Moffatt, Debbie Lynch-White, Véronic DiCaire, Valérie Blais, Pierrette Robitaille, Diane Lavallée, Véronique Le Flaguais, Jeanne Bellefeuille, Benoît Brière, Maxime Le Flaguais, Yves Jacques, Guillaume Cyr, Mégane Proulx, Steve Laplante, Isabelle Blais and Charles-Aubey Houde.

The film has also screened in some markets under the English release title Our Sisters-in-Law, but its English title is officially Sisters and Neighbors! per Telefilm Canada.

The film had a gala premiere on July 8, 2024, before opening commercially on July 11. It was an immediate hit, surpassing the $1 million benchmark for box office success in the Quebec market within one week of its release.

== Awards ==
Award / Film Festival	Date of ceremony	Category	Recipient(s)	Result	Ref.
Prix Iris	December 8, 2024	Best Costume Design	Francesca Chamberland	Nominated	
Prix Iris	December 8, 2024	Best Original Music	Daniel Bélanger	Won	
Prix Iris	December 8, 2024	Best Hairstyling	Daniel Jacob	Won	
Prix Iris	December 8, 2024	Best Makeup	Catherine Lavoie	Nominated	
Prix Iris	December 8, 2024	Best Visual Effects	Marie-Claude Lafontaine, Jean-François Ferland, Sébastien Chartier	Nominated	
Prix Iris	December 8, 2024	Prix Michel-Côté	Yoann Sauvageau, Denise Robert, René Richard Cyr	Won	
Canadian Screen Awards	May 31, 2025	Golden Screen Award	Denise Robert	Won	
