= Father and Guns =

- French: De père en flic
- Directed by: Émile Gaudreault
- Written by: Émile Gaudreault; Ian Lauzon
- Produced by: Daniel Louis; Denise Robert
- Starring: Michel Côté; Louis-José Houde; Rémy Girard; Caroline Dhavernas; Robin Aubert; Patrick Drolet
- Cinematography: Bruce Chun
- Music by: FM Le Sieur
- Distributed by: Alliance Vivafilm
- Release date: July 8, 2009
- Running time: 107 minutes
- Country: Canada
- Languages: French; English
- Budget: CAD$6 million

Father and Guns (French: De père en flic) is a Canadian comedy film originating from Quebec that was released in 2009. Directed by Émile Gaudreault, the film stars Michel Côté and Louis-José Houde as Jacques and Marc Laroche, feuding father and son police officers who are forced to re-evaluate their relationship when they are paired up on an undercover assignment in a father-son adventure therapy camp.

The film's cast also includes Caroline Dhavernas, Rémy Girard, Robin Aubert, Pierre Collin and Patrick Drolet.

The film took in over $11 million at the box office, becoming the highest-grossing French-language film in Canadian history. A sequel film, Father and Guns 2 (De père en flic 2), was released in 2017.

== Awards ==
The film was named the winner of the Golden Reel Award, for highest-grossing Canadian film of the year, at the 30th Genie Awards. Girard and Drolet also garnered Best Supporting Actor nominations, and Gaudreault and Ian Lauzon were nominated for Best Original Screenplay.
