= Votez Bougon =

2016 film by Jean-François Pouliot

- Directed by: Jean-François Pouliot
- Written by: François Avard; Jean-François Mercier; Louis Morissette
- Produced by: Fabienne Larouche; Michel Trudeau
- Starring: Rémy Girard; Louison Danis; Hélène Bourgeois Leclerc; Antoine Bertrand
- Cinematography: Allen Smith
- Edited by: Éric Drouin
- Music by: FM Le Sieur
- Production company: Remstar
- Release date: December 16, 2016
- Running time: 97 min
- Country: Canada
- Language: French

Votez Bougon is a Canadian comedy film, directed by Jean-François Pouliot and released in 2016.

Based on the 2000s television sitcom Les Bougon, the film is a political satire in which Paul Bougon (Rémy Girard) enters politics, starting his own political party and catching a populist wave that results in his being elected as the new Premier of Quebec. All of the actors from the television series reprised their original roles, with the exception that the role of adopted daughter Mao was recast.

Although press coverage of the film noted some similarities to the presidential campaign of Donald Trump, the film was more directly inspired by Quebec populist gadfly Bernard "Rambo" Gauthier.

The film was a shortlisted finalist for the Public Prize, an audience-voted fan award, at the 19th Quebec Cinema Awards. It was the second most successful Quebec film of 2016 at the box office, behind The 3 L'il Pigs 2 (Les 3 p'tits cochons 2).
