= Pierrette Robitaille =

Canadian actress

Pierrette Robitaille C.M. (born June 6, 1950) is a Canadian film and television actress from Quebec.

== Career ==
Robitaille is a two-time Genie Award nominee for Best Actress, for her role as Mme Therrien in It's Your Turn, Laura Cadieux (C't'à ton tour, Laura Cadieux) and its sequel Laura Cadieux II (Laura Cadieux...la suite), and a Jutra Award winner for Best Actress for her performance as Vic in Vic et flo ont vu un ours.

Her other credits have included the films Mambo Italiano, Intimate Power (Pouvoir intime), Poverty and Other Delights (Joyeux calvaire), Wedding Night (Nuit de noces), A Sense of Humour (Le sens de l'humour), Alice's Odyssey (L'Odyssée d'Alice Tremblay) and Séraphin: Heart of Stone (Séraphin: un homme et son péché).

Robitaille was appointed a member of the Order of Canada in 2011.

== Filmography ==
=== Film ===
Year	Title	Role	Notes
1982	Red Eyes (Les Yeux rouges)	Colette	
1986	Intimate Power (Pouvoir intime)	Touriste	
1986	Bach and Broccoli (Bach et Bottine)	Dame au restaurant	
1989	In the Belly of the Dragon (Dans le ventre du dragon)	Chef-infirmière	
1990	Ding et Dong	Receptionniste	
1991	Montreal Stories (Montréal vu par...)	Femme de Charley	
1996	Poverty and Other Delights (Joyeux Calvaire)	La soeur de Marcel	
1998	It's Your Turn, Laura Cadieux (C't'à ton tour, Laura Cadieux)	Madame Therrien	
1998	Free Money	Mrs. Reverend Schmidt	
1999	Laura Cadieux II (Laura Cadieux...la suite)	Mme Therrien	
2001	Wedding Night (Nuit de noces)	Claire	
2002	Alice's Odyssey (L'odyssée d'Alice Tremblay)	Various roles	
2002	Séraphin: Heart of Stone (Séraphin: un homme et son péché)	Mme Malterre	
2003	Mambo Italiano	Rosetta	
2005	The Outlander (Le Survenant)	Laure Provençal	
2005	Idole instantanée	La voyante	
2011	A Sense of Humour (Le Sens de l'humour)	Lise	
2012	Le colis	Elisabeth O'Donnel	
2013	Vic and Flo Saw a Bear (Vic+Flo ont vu un ours)	Victoria Champagne	
2015	The Passion of Augustine (La Passion d'Augustine)	Soeur Onésime	
2022	How to Get Your Parents to Divorce (Pas d'chicane dans ma cabane!)	Dame géante	
2024	Sisters and Neighbors! (Nos belles-sœurs)	Rhéauna Bibeau	
2025	Compulsive Liar 2 (Menteuse)	Louison Hébert	
2026	Nobody's Violence	White	

=== Television ===
Year	Title	Role	Notes
1987, 1990	Avec un grand A	Julie / La veuve	2 episodes
1995	Les grands procès	Madame Gallagher	Episode: "L'affaire Nogaret"
1995	La Petite Vie	Darling	Episode: "Réjean reçoit"
1999	Maurice Richard: Histoire d'un Canadien	Alice Richard	2 episodes
2003	Le petit monde de Laura Cadieux	Mme Therrien	Miniseries
2005–2007	Nos étés	Bernadette Lozeau	17 episodes
2007	Dieu merci!	Une concurrente	Episode #1.1
2014	À moitié plein	Mme. Thibault	Television film
2014–2016	Toi & Moi	Nadine Olyphant	12 episodes
2015–2020	Madame Lebrun	Margot Dufour	16 episodes
