= Mariana Mazza =

Canadian comedian (born 1990)

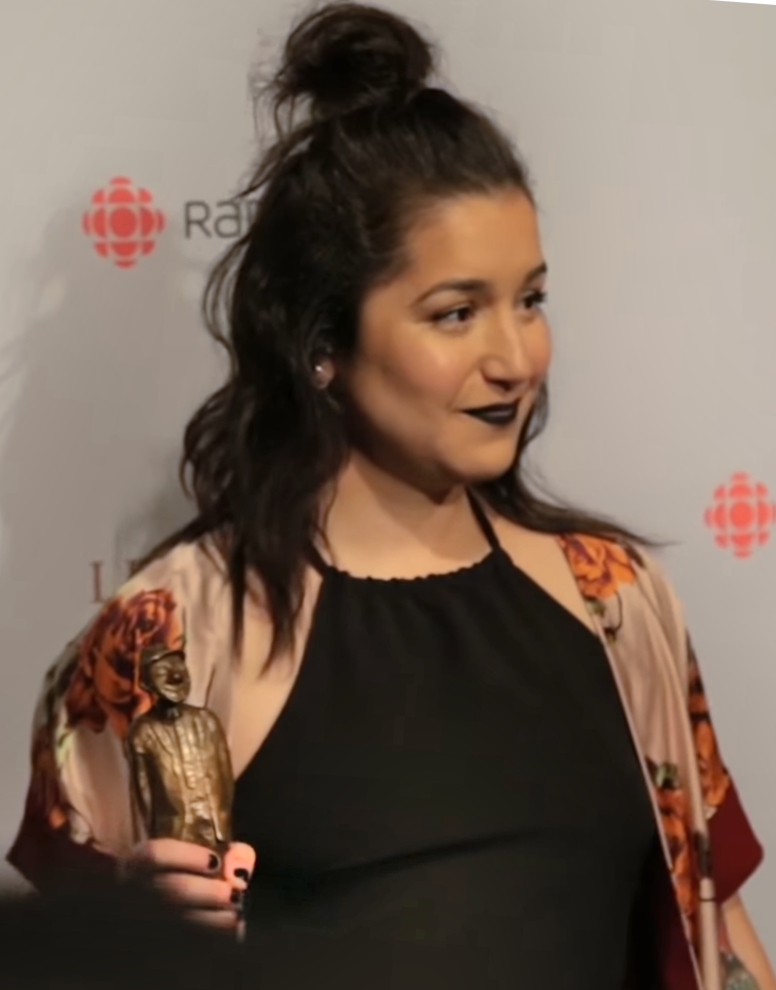
- Mariana Mazza en 2016.
- Website: marianamazza.com

Mariana Mazza (born 5 July 1990 in Montreal) is a Canadian comedian from Quebec of Uruguayan and Lebanese origin. She is also an actress, appearing notably in the films Bon Cop, Bad Cop 2 in 2017, with among others Patrick Huard and Colm Feore, as well as in Father and Guns 2 released the same year, starring Louis-José Houde and Michel Côté.

== Comedy career ==
Mariana Mazza made her comedy debut on the stages of the Couscous Comedy Show and Le Grand Rire de Québec, among others.

In 2013, she participated in En route vers mon premier gala Juste pour rire where she was among the four finalists, alongside Virginie Fortin, Phil Roy and Alex Douville.

She then took part in the Avenir Lac Mégantic event and opened for the hypnotist Messmer at the Olympia in Paris and Peter MacLeod

In 2014, she was crowned "Just for Laughs Festival Revelation", following her appearance at the Sexe opposé gala, hosted by Maxim Martin and Anaïs Favron.

In 2017, she received the Olivier award for Comedian of the Year for her show Femme ta gueule.

In 2022, she published a book of memoirs, Montreal-Nord.

=== Mazza/Fortin ===
In 2013, Mariana Mazza and Virginie Fortin presented their show Mazza/Fortin : chacun son show, as part of Zoofest. It was after this success that the two comedians decided to join forces to create their "Two Women Show": Mazza/Fortin : 2 révélations, 1 incontournable. The show premiered on May 1, 2014, at Théâtre Saint Denis.

== Television ==
Mariana Mazza is a contributor to Alors on jase and also contributes to Musique Plus' Cliptoman program. In fall 2014, she hosted In chalet on the Unis channel.

Since 2015, she has played Stéphanie in the sketch series MED, presented on VRAK. She is also a contributor to the daily show Code F.

On May 1, 2016, she participated in the last episode of the season of Tout le monde en parle to present her first solo show.

In a show from the fourth season of Les Pêcheurs released in October 2016, she plays herself as she is hit in the face by Martin Petit's fishing hook (it catches in her nostril). Most of the show takes place in the hospital, where she awaits the treatment required by this incident.

== Filmography ==
- 2017 : Bon Cop, Bad Cop 2 MC
- 2017 : Father and Guns 2: Elissa
- 2020 : Femme ta gueule, le film : herself
- 2021 : Maria : Maria
- 2022 : Lines of Escape : Sabina

== See also ==
- List of comedians from Quebec
