= Day and Night (1997 film) =

- Directed by: Bernard-Henri Lévy
- Written by: Bernard-Henri Lévy; Jean-Paul Enthoven; Guadalupe Loaeza
- Produced by: Jacques de Clercq; Eric Dussart; Denise Robert
- Starring: Alain Delon; Lauren Bacall; Arielle Dombasle; Francisco Rabal
- Cinematography: Willy Kurant
- Edited by: France Duez
- Music by: Maurice Jarre
- Production companies: Les Films du Lendemain; Cinémaginaire
- Distributed by: MKL Distribution
- Release dates: 12 February 1997 (France); 17 February 1997 (Berlin)
- Running time: 108 minutes
- Countries: France; Belgium; Canada; Spain
- Language: French

Day and Night (French: Le Jour et la Nuit) is a 1997 French drama film directed by public intellectual Bernard-Henri Lévy and starring Alain Delon, Lauren Bacall, Arielle Dombasle and Francisco Rabal. The film follows a French author who fled to Mexico for a quiet life and an actress who is willing to seduce him to get a part in a film adapted from one of his books.

== Cast ==
- Alain Delon as Alexandre
- Lauren Bacall as Sonia
- Arielle Dombasle as Laure
- Karl Zéro as Filippi
- Francisco Rabal as Cristobal
- Marianne Denicourt as Ariane

== Reception ==
The film opened in France on 74 screens and grossed $236,256 in its opening week, ranking 14th at the box office. The Independent described Day and Night as "an unmitigated critical disaster and a complete box office flop". When the film premiered at the 47th Berlin International Film Festival in 1997, hundreds of journalists walked out of the screening and those that stayed audibly ridiculed the film. Day and Night was considered the worst French film since 1945 by Cahiers du cinéma, and considered as a possible "worst film in history" by the French version of Slate. Variety claimed that the film was, "Laugh-out-loud awful without touching the cult realm of 'so bad it's good". Françoise Giroud stated "It's a bad movie, there's no question", L'Humanité called it an "Absolute debacle", and Michel Houellebecq referred to it as the "most preposterous film in history". English-language film site /Film described its status as "one of the worst foreign language movies ever made". An original documentary, Anatomy of a Massacre, was released with the Day and Night DVD, and focused on the film's intense negative reception and failure.

== See also ==
- List of 20th century films considered the worst
