= Hélène Bourgeois Leclerc =

Canadian actress

Hélène Bourgeois Leclerc (born April 15, 1974) is a Canadian actress from Chicoutimi, Quebec. She is most noted for her performances in the films Aurore, for which she was a Jutra Award nominee for Best Actress at the 8th Jutra Awards in 2006, and Je me souviens, for which she was a Jutra nominee for Best Supporting Actress at the 12th Jutra Awards in 2010.

She has also appeared in the films Honey, I'm in Love (Le Grand départ), Taking the Plunge (À vos marques... party!), The Trotsky, 9, Votez Bougon and Father and Guns 2 (De père en flic 2), and the television series 450, Chemin du Golf, Les Bougon, Bye Bye, District 31 and Toute la vie.
