= Pierre Collin (actor) =

Canadian actor (1938–2023)

- Born: July 18, 1938; Montreal, Quebec, Canada
- Died: July 27, 2023 (aged 85); Canada
- Occupations: Actor, stage director
- Years active: 1960s–2023
- Notable work: Seducing Doctor Lewis

Pierre Collin (July 18, 1938 – July 27, 2023) was a Canadian actor and stage director. He is most noted for his performance in the 2003 film Seducing Doctor Lewis (La Grande Séduction), for which he won the Jutra Award for Best Supporting Actor at the 6th Jutra Awards in 2004.

Collin began his career in the 1960s with the avant garde theatre troupe Les Apprentis-Sorciers.

Collin died on July 27, 2023, at the age of 85.

== Filmography ==
=== Film ===
Year	Title	Role	Notes
1994	Si belles	Lynne's Father	
1999	Post Mortem	Lieutenant Bélanger	
2000	Maelström	Priest	
2001	Karmina 2	The Baron	
2003	Seducing Doctor Lewis (La Grande Séduction)	Yvon Brunet	
2003	How My Mother Gave Birth to Me During Menopause (Comment ma mère accoucha de moi durant sa ménopause)	Rocco	
2004	Bittersweet Memories (Ma vie en cinémascope)	Doctor	
2004	Dans une galaxie près de chez vous	Le Devin / Heul Savè	
2004	L'Espérance	Arsène	
2005	The Outlander	Pierre-Côme Provençal	
2005	Niagara Motel	Claude	
2005	Aurore	Gédéon Gagnon	
2005	The Novena (La Neuvaine)	Father Confessor	
2005	Saint Martyrs of the Damned (Saints-Martyrs-des-Damnés)	Raoul Bosh	
2006	Family History (Histoire de famille)	Donatien Boileau	
2006	Deliver Me (Délivrez-moi)	Monsieur Déry	
2006	In the Cities (Dans les villes)		
2007	La lâcheté	Vieux Gravel	
2009	Father and Guns (De père en flic)	Père Grano / Antoine	
2010	Route 132	Guy Lévesque	
2011	A Sense of Humour (Le sens de l'humour)	Père Gendron	
2012	Columbarium	Marcel	
2012	Ésimésac	Lorenzo Deziel	
2014	Henri Henri	Noé	
2015	Ego Trip	Jean Morin	
2019	And the Birds Rained Down (Il pleuvait des oiseaux)	Dead Husband	

=== Television ===
Year	Title	Role	Notes
1988	Onzième spéciale	Marc-André	
1991	Archibald	Inspector	
1992	Scoop	Vice-President des Castors	
1993	Les grands procès	Monsieur Pitre	
1994	The Wizard	Ernest	
1996	Omertà	P.E. Langlois	
1996	Virginie	Richard Bellefeuille	
1997	Radio Enfer	Antoine "Coton" Morisseau	
1997	L'enfant des Appalaches	Lucien	
1998	Réseaux	Jacques Rancourt	
2001	Fred-dy	Maurice	
2001	La vie, la vie	Monsieur Gendron	
2004	Les Bougon	Gérant	
2004	Rumeurs	Esther's Father	
2005	Le négociateur	Marcel Corbo	
2006	François en série	Normand	
2006	Vice caché		
2006	René Lévesque	Detective Lebrun	
2006	Caméra Café	Lucien	
2012-2013	Unité 9	Yvon Lamontagne	
2012-2014	Toute la vérité	Claude Lavergne	
2015-2017	Les beaux malaises	Old Man	
2015-2019	Madame Lebrun	Adélard Lebrun	
2017	Victor Lessard	Claude Côté	
