= Leni Parker =

Canadian television and film actress (born 1965)

- Born: November 5, 1965 (age 60); New Brunswick, Canada
- Occupations: Film and Television Actress
- Years active: 1990-present

Leni Parker (born November 5, 1965) is a Canadian television and film actress. She is best known for her portrayal of the androgynous alien Da'an in Gene Roddenberry's Earth: Final Conflict.

== Early life and education ==
Parker was born and raised in New Brunswick. She moved to Montreal, where she completed a three-year acting program at Concordia University.

== Career ==
After graduating from Concordia, she began working with Pigeons International Theatre for the next 10 years. She was awarded Best Supporting Actress at the Theatre Critics of Quebec Awards in 1992 for her role as la Bonne in Coquelicots.

== Filmography ==
=== Film ===
Year	Title	Role	Notes
1990	You're Driving Me Crazy	Alice	
1992	Canvas	Simone	
1994	Mrs. Parker and the Vicious Circle	Beatrice Kaufman	
1995	Screamers	Cpl. McDonald	
1997	Bleeders	Baby Laura	
1997	The Assignment	OPEC Receptionist	
1997	The Education of Little Tree	Martha	
1997	Laserhawk	Waitress at Ed's	
1998	The Sleep Room	Sadie Rothenberg	
1998	Nico the Unicorn	Librarian	
2000	Eisenstein	Anya	
2003	Mambo Italiano	TV Anna	
2005	The Man	Cashier	
2008	Afterwards	Admission Clerk	
2008	Adam's Wall	Anita Levy	
2009	Orphan	Delivery Room Nurse	
2009	Mr. Nobody	Teacher	
2012	The Words	Journalist	
2013	White House Down	Speaker's Assistant	
2013	The Young and Prodigious T. S. Spivet	Doctor Ferrano	
2014	An Eye for Beauty	Sarah Handelsman	
2017	Song of Granite	Mrs. Rosenblatt	Uncredited
2018	My Thesis Film: A Thesis Film by Erik Anderson	Auntie Carol	
2018	The Death & Life of John F. Donovan	Bonnie	Uncredited
2020	My Salinger Year	Pam	
2023	Transformers: Rise of the Beasts	Ms. Greene	

=== Television ===
Year	Title	Role	Notes
1994	Are You Afraid of the Dark?	Cop	Episode: "The Tale of the Quiet Librarian"
1994	Million Dollar Babies	Dixie	2 episodes
1995	Sirens	Doctor	Episode: "Redemption"
1995	Une petite fille particulière	Hotesse au salon de thè	Television film
1995	Hiroshima	Margaret Truman	Television film
1997	Whiskers	Receptionist	Television film
1997	The Best Bad Thing	Nurse	Television film
1997	Heritage Minutes	Emilie	Episode: "John Humphrey"
1997	The Hunger	Reporter	Episode: "Red Light"
1997–1999	Lassie	Lucy	4 episodes
1997–2001	Earth: Final Conflict	Da'an / Ma'el	88 episodes
1998	Emily of New Moon	Miss Brownell	5 episodes
2000	The Hound of the Baskervilles	Mrs. Barrymore	Television film
2002	Galidor: Defenders of the Outer Dimension	Mrs. Browning	Episode: "Identity"
2002	Charms for the Easy Life	Young Mother	Television film
2003	Deadly Betrayal	Roz	Television film
2003	Wild Card	Zoo Legal Rep	Episode: "Hell Week"
2005	Choice: The Henry Morgentaler Story	Judy Rebick	Television film
2005	Living with the Enemy	Cheryl Cummings	Television film
2006	At the Hotel	Mrs. Fishman	Episode: "That's How You Wave a Towel"
2007	Moose TV	Susan	Episode: "Surviving Moose"
2007	The Dead Zone	Ms. Marcy Lyons	Episode: "Numb"
2009	Out of Control	Donna Sinclair	Television film
2011	Who Is Simon Miller?	Donna Gilbert	Television film
2014	Helix	Dr. Tracey	2 episodes
2015–2017	19-2	Detective Pilcher	4 episodes
2017	Mommy's Prison Secret	Lenni Page	Television film
2017	There Is Something in Slough Lake	Claire	Television film
2018	The Detectives	Ann Bucholz	Episode: "Home"
2019	Street Legal	Giulia Lissandri	6 episodes
2020	Barkskins	Mother Sabrine	6 episodes
2020	As Gouda as it Gets	Sarah	Television film

=== Video games ===
Year	Title	Role
2011	Deus Ex: Human Revolution	Yelena Fedorova / Nia Colvin / Vera Marcovic
2011	Assassin's Creed: Revelations	Laetitia England
2012	Assassin's Creed III: Liberation	Madeleine de L'Isle
2013	Deus Ex: Human Revolution - Director's Cut	Yelena Fedorova / Nia Colvin / Vera Marcovic
2014	Watch Dogs	Civilian - Bad Blood DLC
2017	Assassin's Creed Origins	Voice talent
2021	Disciples: Liberation	Voice
2021	Marvel's Guardians of the Galaxy	Worldmind
2022	Disney Dreamlight Valley	The Forgotten
2025	Lost Records: Bloom & Rage	Pam
