= Testament (2023 film) =

2023 Canadian drama film

- Directed by: Denys Arcand
- Written by: Denys Arcand
- Produced by: Denise Robert
- Starring: Rémy Girard; Sophie Lorain
- Cinematography: Claudine Sauvé
- Edited by: Arthur Tarnowski
- Production company: Cinémaginaire
- Release date: August 26, 2023 (Angoulême)
- Country: Canada
- Languages: French; English

Testament is a 2023 Canadian drama film, written and directed by Denys Arcand. The film stars Rémy Girard as Jean-Michel Bouchard, a writer and retired archivist in his 70s living in a retirement home, who is initially angered when a group of protestors arrive to demand that the facility remove an art installation that has been deemed insulting to First Nations, only to find new love and a new zest for life in the experience.

The supporting cast includes Sophie Lorain, Guylaine Tremblay, Caroline Néron, Charlotte Aubin, Robert Lepage, Denis Bouchard, René Richard Cyr, Clémence Desrochers, Guillaume Lambert, Danièle Lorain, Marie-Soleil Dion, Louis-José Houde, Gaston Lepage, Yves Jacques, Johanne-Marie Tremblay, Pierre Curzi, Geneviève Schmidt, Marcel Sabourin, Brigitte Paquette, Danielle Fichaud, Louise Turcot, Alex Rice and Luc Senay, as well as singer Marie-Mai in her first-ever film acting role.

The film premiered on August 26, 2023, at the Angoulême Francophone Film Festival, before going into commercial release on October 5.
