= René Richard Cyr =

Canadian actor and director

René Richard Cyr (born September 27, 1958) is a Canadian actor, playwright and theatre director from Montreal, Quebec. He is most noted for his roles as barber Méo Bellemare in the films Babine and Ésimésac and as a drag queen Veronica Sinclair in Cover Girl, and as the stage director of many theatrical plays by Michel Tremblay.

Born in Montreal, he is a graduate of the National Theatre School of Canada. Although he has had film and television roles, he is most prominently a stage actor. As a playwright, his works have included Volte-face, La Magnifique Aventure de Denis St-Onge, Marco chaussait des dix, Camille C., L'An de grâce, L'Apprentissage des marais and Les Huit péchés capitaux (Éloges).

He directed Sisters and Neighbors! (Nos belles-sœurs), the 2024 film adaptation of Tremblay's play Les Belles-sœurs.

He is out as gay.

== Filmography ==
=== Film ===
Year	Title	Role	Notes
1983	The Tin Flute (Bonheur d'occasion)	Alphonse	
1994	Louis 19, King of the Airwaves (Louis 19, roi des ondes)	Intello branche	
1996	Poverty and Other Delights (Joyeux Calvaire)	Roland-aux-culottes	
2001	Wedding Night (Nuit des Noces)	Robert	
2008	Babine	Méo Bellemare	
2024	Nos belles-sœurs	travelling salesman	also director
