= Denise Robert =

Canadian film producer

Denise Robert, CM (born 1954) is a Canadian film producer, who is president of Cinémaginaire, a studio she co-founded with Daniel Louis.

== Biography ==
She was born in Ottawa, Ontario. She is currently married to Denys Arcand and she has produced many of his films.

She was invited to join the Academy of Motion Picture Arts and Sciences Producers Branch in 2005, and is also a voting member of the British Academy of Film and Television Arts and the Académie des Arts et Techniques du Cinéma.

In 2014, she was named a Member of the Order of Canada for her work in cinema. She has also been inducted into the Ordre des Arts et des Lettres and the Ordre de la Pléiade.

== Filmography ==
=== Film ===
- 1988 - Straight for the Heart (À corps perdu)
- 1991 - The Savage Woman (La Demoiselle sauvage)
- 1991 - Montreal Stories (Montréal vu par...)
- 1994 - Desire in Motion (Mouvements du désir)
- 1995 - The Confessional (Le Confessionnal)
- 1996 - Poverty and Other Delights (Joyeux Calvaire)
- 1997 - Day and Night (Le jour et la nuit)
- 1997 - The Seat of the Soul (Le Siège de l'âme)
- 1998 - It's Your Turn, Laura Cadieux (C't'à ton tour, Laura Cadieux)
- 1999 - Laura Cadieux II (Laura Cadieux...la suite)
- 2000 - The Widow of Saint-Pierre (La Veuve de Saint-Pierre)
- 2000 - Stardom
- 2001 - Replay (La Répétition)
- 2001 - Wedding Night (Nuit de noces)
- 2001 - Operation Cobra (Opération Cobra)
- 2002 - Alice's Odyssey (L'Odyssée d'Alice Tremblay)
- 2002 - Nearest to Heaven
- 2003 - Mambo Italiano
- 2003 - The Barbarian Invasions (Les Invasions barbares)
- 2003 - Little Lili (La petite Lili)
- 2004 - Mr. Jones: Drive
- 2004 - Bittersweet Memories (Ma vie en cinémascope)
- 2005 - Instant Idol (Idole instantanée)
- 2005 - Aurore
- 2005 - Thieves of Innocence (Les Voleurs d'enfance)
- 2005 - The Rocket (Maurice Richard)
- 2006 - Young Triffie
- 2006 - Romeo and Juliet (Roméo et Juliette)
- 2007 - Days of Darkness (L'Âge des ténèbres)
- 2007 - Surviving My Mother (Comment survivra à sa mère)
- 2008 - Honey, I'm in Love (Le grand départ)
- 2009 - Romaine 30° Below (Romaine par moins 30)
- 2009 - Father and Guns (De père en flic)
- 2009 - Oscar and the Lady in Pink (Oscar et la dame rose)
- 2010 - The Child Prodigy (L'Enfant prodige)
- 2010 - Route 132
- 2011 - A Sense of Humour (Le sens de l'humour)
- 2011 - Surviving Progress
- 2011 - A Better Life (Une vie meilleure)
- 2011 - La Sacrée
- 2012 - Driving to the Edge (Dérapages)
- 2012 - Omertà
- 2013 - 1st Love (1er amour)
- 2014 - An Eye for Beauty (Le règne de la beauté)
- 2014 - Real Lies (Le vrai du faux)
- 2015 - Ego Trip
- 2016 - 1:54
- 2016 - Père fils thérapie!
- 2017 - 375 Jeunesse on tourne!
- 2018 - The Fall of the American Empire (La chute de l'empire américain)
- 2019 - Compulsive Liar (Menteur)
- 2021 - The Perfect Victim (La victime parfaite)
- 2021 - Sam
- 2021 - A Revision (Une révision)
- 2022 - Filiatrault: Parcours d'une légende
- 2023 - Testament
- 2024 - Sisters and Neighbors! (Nos belles-sœurs)
- 2026 - 125, rue des Malaises

=== Television ===
- 1998 - Degas and the Dancer
- 1999 - Winslow Homer: An American Original
- 1999 - Rembrandt: Fathers & Sons
- 1999 - Monet: Shadow and Light
- 1999 - Mary Cassatt: An American Impressionist
- 2003 - Le petit monde de Laura Cadieux

== Awards ==
Award	Year	Category	Work	Result	Ref(s)
Academy Awards	2004	Best Foreign-Language Film	The Barbarian Invasions (Les Invasions barbares) (with Daniel Louis, Denys Arcand)	Won	
British Academy Film Awards	2004	Best Film Not in the English Language	The Barbarian Invasions (Les Invasions barbares) (with Daniel Louis, Denys Arcand)	Nominated	
Genie Awards; Canadian Screen Awards	1989	Best Motion Picture	Straight for the Heart (À corps perdu) (with Robin Spry)	Nominated	
Genie Awards; Canadian Screen Awards	1995	Best Motion Picture	The Confessional (Le Confessionnal)	Won	
Genie Awards; Canadian Screen Awards	2000	Best Motion Picture	Stardom (with Robert Lantos)	Nominated	
Genie Awards; Canadian Screen Awards	2002	Golden Reel Award	Wedding Night (Nuit de noces)	Won	
Genie Awards; Canadian Screen Awards	2003	Best Motion Picture	The Barbarian Invasions (Les Invasions barbares) (with Daniel Louis, Fabienne Vonier)	Won	
Genie Awards; Canadian Screen Awards	2004	Best Motion Picture	Bittersweet Memories (Ma vie en cinémascope) (with Daniel Louis)	Nominated	
Genie Awards; Canadian Screen Awards	2006	Best Motion Picture	The Rocket (Maurice Richard) (with Daniel Louis)	Nominated	
Genie Awards; Canadian Screen Awards	2007	Best Motion Picture	Days of Darkness (L'Âge des ténèbres) (with Daniel Louis)	Nominated	
Genie Awards; Canadian Screen Awards	2018	Golden Screen Award	Father and Guns 2 (De père en flic 2)	Won	
Genie Awards; Canadian Screen Awards	2025	Board of Directors Tribute		Won	
Prix Jutra	2004	Best Film	The Barbarian Invasions (Les invasions barbares) (with Daniel Louis)	Won	
Prix Jutra	2005	Best Film	Bittersweet Memories (Ma vie en cinémascope) (with Daniel Louis)	Nominated	
Prix Jutra	2006	Best Film	The Rocket (Maurice Richard) (with Daniel Louis)	Nominated	
Prix Jutra	2008	Best Film	Days of Darkness (L'âge des ténèbres)	Nominated	
