= Edge of Madness =

- Theatrical release poster
- Directed by: Anne Wheeler
- Written by: Charles K. Pitts; Anne Wheeler
- Based on: A Wilderness Station by Alice Munro
- Produced by: William Wallace Gray
- Starring: Brendan Fehr; Paul Johansson; Corey Sevier; Jonas Chernick; Caroline Dhavernas
- Cinematography: David Frazee
- Edited by: Robert Lower
- Music by: Randolph Peters
- Production companies: Credo Entertainment Group; CinéGroupe; Gregorian Films
- Distributed by: Lions Gate Films
- Release date: January 1, 2002
- Running time: 99 minutes
- Country: Canada
- Language: English

Edge of Madness is a 2002 drama film based on the short story "A Wilderness Station", written by Alice Munro.^{[1]} The Canadian film stars Brendan Fehr, Caroline Dhavernas, and Corey Sevier. Written by Charles K. Pitts and Anne Wheeler, the film is based on the life of a young woman (Annie) who confesses to the murder of her husband. Annie is selected out of an orphanage to be a part of an arranged marriage and to be a housewife at a homestead. After countless rapes and times of abuse, George the brother of Simon (Annie's husband), murders Simon. As the story progresses, Annie confesses to this murder and her life and liberty are put into question.

The movie has not received any specific awards, but Anne Wheeler was awarded the DGC Lifetime Award at the 2016 Directors Guild Canada Awards. Her awards stemmed from her achievements from films such as Edge of Madness, Better Than Chocolate, and Chi.

== Plot ==
Annie Herron is abused by her husband, Simon, whilst his brother, George, was seemingly helpless to intervene. The film hits an interesting twist when Simon is murdered. Annie is convinced that she is the murderer, even as she gets herself admitted to the jail in the Fort.

In 1851, Annie is living in an orphanage and is put into an arranged marriage to Simon, who takes her to a homestead which is still being built. He puts her to work cooking and cleaning for him and his brother, George. At night, Simon expects Annie to submit to his rough sexual advances, even raping her several times. George tries to talk to Simon about treating Annie better, but his pleas fall on deaf ears. Simon becomes ever more brutal towards Annie, even beating her while he's in a drunken rage.

Meanwhile, George himself is interested in pursuing Annie, which puts her into emotional turmoil. Simon's murder culminates these events, with Annie being locked up in the jail, while a Detective, Henry Mullen, investigates.

Through flashbacks, we learn that George, distraught from witnessing how his brother treated Annie, kills Simon by hitting him in the back with an axe. He brings Simon's body back to the homestead, telling Annie that a tree branch had fallen on him. Annie, by this time, had been driven mad from the beatings and rapes Simon had forced upon her. She hits Simon posthumously on the head with a rock. She and George consummate their feelings. Days later, she admits herself to the jail, while George has fled the homestead to stay with a neighboring family. After reading the unsent letter from Annie and learning of her abused life, Henry decides to dismiss the investigation of the death of Simon, and let Annie and George live their lives. Henry tells Annie that Sadie is dead, and they share a painful moment and hug each other.

One year later in church, George marries neighbour Treece family's daughter Jenny. Annie finds out while in the jail that she is pregnant, but is not certain whether the father is Simon or George. George apologizes to Annie for not being there and staying with her, but Annie forgives George. She declares the baby girl as being Simon's child, so that the child will always be welcome and cared for in later life. The film ends where Annie and Henry look at each other and they share a dance in a good moment at a party.

== Cast ==
- Brendan Fehr as Simon Herron
- Paul Johansson as Henry Mullen
- Corey Sevier as George Herron
- Jonas Chernick as William Sellor
- Caroline Dhavernas as Annie Herron
- Tantoo Cardinal as Ruth
- Peter Wingfield as Reverend Walter McBain

== Production ==
=== Release ===
Edge of Madness had a relatively small release only being aired on a single screen in Vancouver after being passed by both the Toronto Film Festival and Vancouver Film Festival. Anne Wheeler described her displeasure for the small release, but attributed it partly to having no major stars in the film
