= Guadalupe Loaeza =

Mexican writer

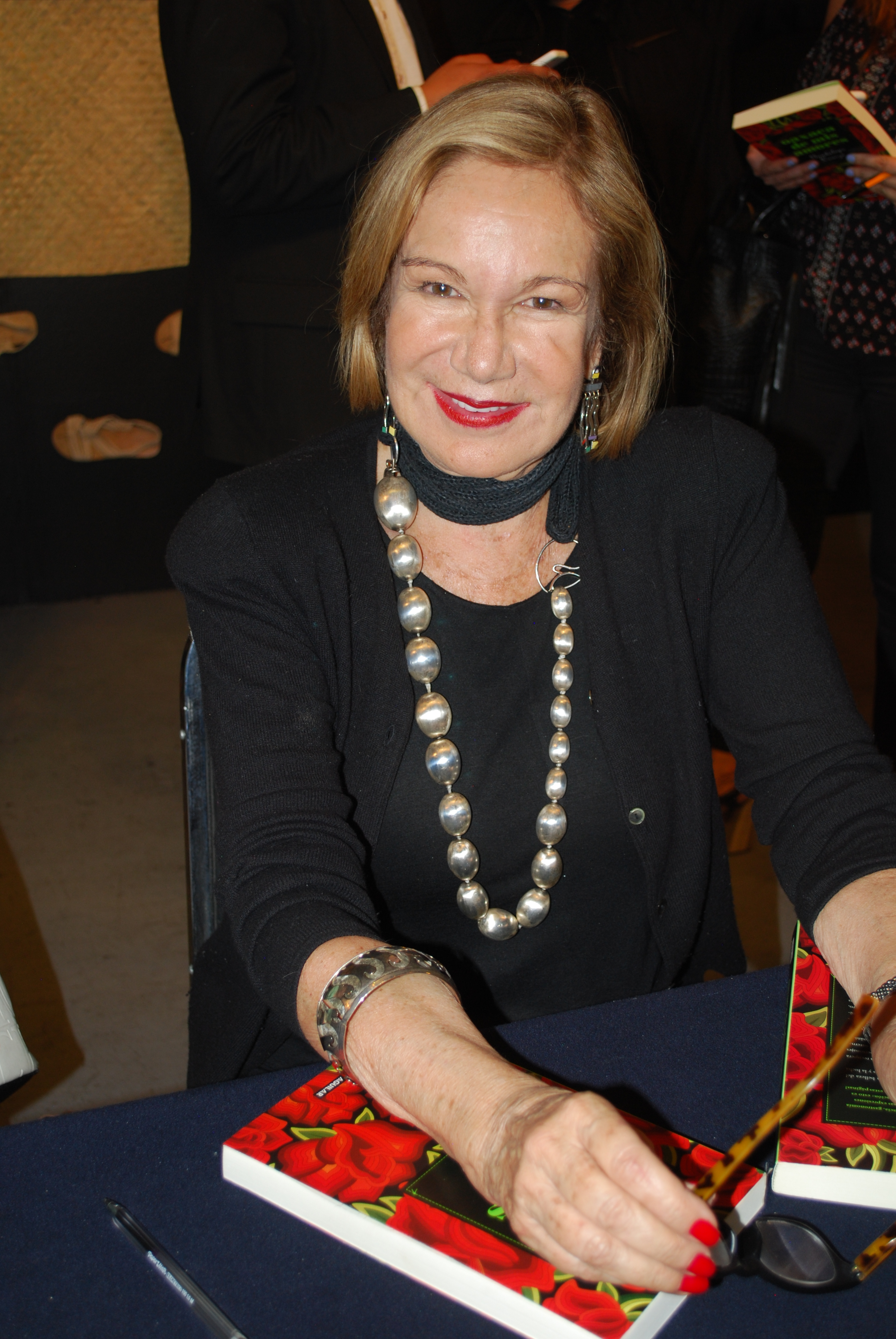
- Loaeza at the presentation of the book Oaxaca de mis amores
- Born: María Guadalupe Loaeza Tovar; August 12, 1946 (age 79)
- Occupation: Writer
- Spouse: Enrique Goldbard

María Guadalupe Loaeza Tovar (born August 12, 1946) is a contemporary Mexican writer, author of many books including Las Niñas Bien, Las Reinas de Polanco, Debo, Luego Sufro and Compro, Luego Existo, in which she ironizes about the Mexican upper class. A participant in Elena Poniatowska's writing workshops in the mid-1980s, she has transformed her success as a chronicler, observer, and critic of the Mexican bourgeoisie and the post-1985 democratization of Mexico into a successful career. Known for her trademark pearl necklace (a family heirloom) and for her francophile tendencies, she has become an influential cultural figure. Some of her books are compilations of her articles published in newspapers such as Unomásuno and La Jornada. She was born in Mexico City. She had two children from her first marriage. In 2003, Guadalupe Loaeza received the distinction of Chevalier from the Légion d'Honneur of France.

Her short story "Miroslava" was adapted into a 1993 film of the same name, and she also wrote dialogue for the 1997 film Day and Night (1997).

As of 2008, Loaeza is a columnist for the Reforma newspaper and is married to Dr. Enrique Goldbard.

== Books ==
- Las niñas bien (1985)
- Las reinas de Polanco (1986)
- Primero las damas (1988)
- Los grillos y otras grillas (1990)
- Compro, luego existo (1992)
- Obsesiones (1994)
- Manual de la gente bien I (1995)
- Manual de la gente bien II (1996)
- Sin cuenta (1997)
- Mujeres maravillosas (1997)
- El ángel de nuestras nostalgias (1998)
- Ellas y nosotras (1998)
- Obsesiones de Sofía (1999)
- La factura (1999)
- Debo, luego sufro (2000)
- Los de arriba (2002)
- Las yeguas finas (2003)
- Hombres maravillosos (2003)
- Simplemente Martita (2004)
- Por los de abajo (2005)
- Terremoto (2005)
- Siempre estará París (2005)
- Por medio de la presente (2006)
- Confieso que he leído...¡Hola! (2006)
- La comedia electoral.. Diario de campaña de una ex niña bien (2009)
- Las Niñas Bien... 25 Años Despúes (2010)
- En el closet (2011)
- La puerta falsa (2011)
- El Caballero del Titanic (2012)
- Leer o Morir (2013)
- Oaxaca de mis amores (2016)

== See also ==
- List of newspapers in Mexico
