= An Eye for Beauty =

2014 film

- Film poster
- French: Le règne de la beauté
- Directed by: Denys Arcand
- Written by: Denys Arcand; Valérie Beaugrand-Champagne
- Produced by: Daniel Louis; Denise Robert
- Starring: Éric Bruneau; Mélanie Thierry; Melanie Merkosky; Marie-Josée Croze
- Cinematography: Nathalie Moliavko-Visotzky
- Edited by: Isabelle Dedieu
- Music by: Pierre-Philippe Côté
- Distributed by: Les Films Séville
- Release date: May 15, 2014
- Running time: 105 minutes
- Country: Canada
- Languages: French; English

An Eye for Beauty (French: Le règne de la beauté) is a 2014 Canadian drama film directed by Denys Arcand.

The film stars Éric Bruneau as Luc, an architect from Quebec married to Stéphanie (Mélanie Thierry), who begins an extramarital affair with Lindsay (Melanie Merkosky) while on a business trip to Toronto. The film is distributed in the US by Monument Releasing.

== Cast ==
- Éric Bruneau as Luc
- Mélanie Thierry as Stéphanie
- Melanie Merkosky as Lindsay
- Marie-Josée Croze as Isabelle
- Geneviève Boivin-Roussy as Melissa
- Michel Forget as Roger
- Mathieu Quesnel as Nicolas
- Magalie Lépine-Blondeau as Karine
- Yves Jacques as Pascal
- Juana Acosta as Juana
- Johanne-Marie Tremblay as Manon
- Leni Parker as Sarah Handelsman
- Judith Magre as Mathilde
- Édith Scob as Edwige
