= 9 (2016 film) =

2016 Canadian comedy-drama film

- Film poster
- French: 9, le film
- Directed by: Claude Brie; Érik Canuel; Jean-Philippe Duval; Marc Labrèche; Micheline Lanctôt; Luc Picard; Stéphane E. Roy; Éric Tessier; Ricardo Trogi
- Written by: Stéphane E. Roy
- Based on: 9 Variations on the Void (Neuf variations sur le vide) by Stéphane E. Roy
- Produced by: Luc Châtelain; Stéphanie Pages
- Cinematography: Vincent Biron; Yves Bélanger; Bernard Couture; François Dutil; Alexandre Lampron; Ronald Plante; Claudine Sauvé; Nicolas Venne
- Edited by: Carina Baccanale; Alain Baril; Aube Foglia; Gaétan Huot; Matthieu Paradis; Carmen Mélanie Pépin; Myriam Poirier; Yvann Thibaudeau
- Music by: Ludovic Bonnier; Anthony Rozankovic
- Production company: Echo Media
- Distributed by: L'Atelier Distribution de films
- Release date: September 6, 2016
- Running time: 98 minutes
- Country: Canada
- Language: French

9 (French: 9, le film) is a 2016 Canadian comedy-drama film. Adapted from Stéphane E. Roy's theatrical play 9 Variations on the Void (Neuf variations sur le vide), the film is an anthology of nine short films by nine different film directors on the theme of communication difficulties, unified by the common narrative element of a conference on communication by self-help guru Marc Gélinas (played by Roy). Segments were directed by Roy, Claude Brie, Érik Canuel, Jean-Philippe Duval, Marc Labrèche, Micheline Lanctôt, Luc Picard, Éric Tessier and Ricardo Trogi.

== Segments ==
- "Abus" (Roy) - Annabelle (Anne-Marie Cadieux) and Christian (Christian Bégin) are a married couple who play manipulative games with each other.
- "Subitement" (Picard) – An actor receives a call informing him of his partner's sudden death, becoming trapped in a circle of hollow communication as the people around him don't know how to meaningfully express themselves around death. With Alexis Martin, Sophie Cadieux, Charlotte Aubin.
- "Fuite" (Trogi) – A couple (Hélène Bourgeois Leclerc and Pierre-François Legendre) run into conflict while travelling in Brussels.
- "Hystérie" (Duval) – A director (François Papineau) and an actress (Bénédicte Décary) working together on a television commercial are interested in each other, but play tricks on each other as they struggle to communicate their real feelings.
- "Je me souviens" (Lanctôt) – At a reunion, two old friends (Anne-Élisabeth Bossé, Magalie Lépine-Blondeau) are unexpectedly confronted with the revelation that one has no recollection at all of the shared experience that defined their friendship for the other.
- "Halte Routière" (Canuel) – Two truck drivers (Nicolas Canuel, Maxim Gaudette) meet at a truck stop and engage in a game of sexual attraction and rejection.
- "Banqueroute" (Brie) – A man returning from a trip goes to the bank to withdraw money, only to be told that his account is empty. With Sylvain Marcel, Marianne Farley, Diane Lavallée and Goûchy Boy.
- "Le lecteur" (Labrèche) – A man's attempt to buy a DVD player evolves into an existential discussion with the salesman. Starring Labrèche and Marc Fournier.
- "Eccéité" (Tessier) – Marc Gélinas must confront the accuracy of his own teachings when he reunites with an ex-girlfriend (Noémie Godin-Vigneau).
