= Benoît Brière =

Canadian actor and playwright (born 1965)

Benoît Brière (born June 20, 1965) is a Canadian actor from Quebec. He is most noted for his performance in the film Seducing Doctor Lewis (La Grande séduction), for which he was a Genie Award nominee for Best Supporting Actor at the 24th Genie Awards and a Jutra Award nominee for Best Supporting Actor at the 6th Jutra Awards.

Born and raised in Longueuil, Quebec, he graduated from the National Theatre School of Canada in 1991. He has appeared on stage in productions of The Mistress of the Inn, The Barber of Seville, Le Bourgeois gentilhomme and Dom Juan, winning Masques Awards from Quebec's Académie québécoise du théâtre for The Mistress of the Inn and Dom Juan. He first became famous in Quebec for appearing in a series of Bell Canada commercials.

He has also had roles in the films Louis 19, King of the Airwaves (Louis 19, le roi des ondes), Poverty and Other Delights (Joyeux calvaire), The Seat of the Soul (Le siège de l'âme), Stardom, The Baroness and the Pig, North Station (Station Nord), Séraphin: Heart of Stone (Séraphin: un homme et son péché), Audition (L'Audition), Days of Darkness (L'Âge des ténèbres), The Child Prodigy (L'Enfant prodige), A Sense of Humour (Le Sens de l'humour), Walter and Tandoori's Christmas, April and the Extraordinary World, Kiss Me Like a Lover (Embrasse-moi comme tu m'aimes), Hochelaga, Land of Souls (Hochelaga, terre des âmes), The Fall of the American Empire (Le Chute de l'empire américain), Arlette and Dusk for a Hitman (Crépuscule pour un tueur), and the television series Marguerite Vollant, Cher Olivier, La Petite Vie, Le Négociateur, Musée Eden, Madame Lebrun and Empathie.
