= Niagara Motel =

2005 film by Gary Yates

- Directed by: Gary Yates
- Written by: Dani Romain; George F. Walker
- Produced by: Phyllis Laing; Michael Prupas; Bernard Zukerman
- Starring: Caroline Dhavernas; Craig Ferguson; Anna Friel
- Cinematography: Ian Wilson
- Edited by: Simon Cozens
- Music by: Guy Fletcher; The Lyric Quartet
- Distributed by: Mongrel Media (Canada); Soda Pictures (United Kingdom)
- Release date: September 25, 2005 (FIFM)
- Running time: 88 minutes
- Country: Canada
- Language: English
- Budget: $8 million

Niagara Motel is a 2006 Canadian comedy-drama film directed by Gary Yates. The screenplay was adapted by George F. Walker from his Suburban Motel series of six plays.

The film premiered at the 2005 New Montreal FilmFest, before going into commercial release in 2006.

== Plot ==
The film centres on the inhabitants of the titular motel and linked Riverside Grill coffee shop located in Niagara Falls. The characters include the owner and his daughter (Damir Andrei and Catherine Fitch), their newly pregnant waitress (Caroline Dhavernas) being recruited to star in low budget porn videos, a young couple (Anna Friel and Kris Holden-Ried) with a criminal past struggling to recover their child from social services, and a middle class husband and wife (Peter Keleghan and Wendy Crewson) in a marriage that is disintegrating in near-record time - all led by a drunken motel caretaker (Craig Ferguson).

== Cast ==
- Craig Ferguson as Phillie, The Motel Caretaker
- Peter Keleghan as Henry
- Damir Andrei as Boris, The Motel Owner
- Wendy Crewson as Lily
- Anna Friel as Denise
- Kris Holden-Ried as R.J.
- Kevin Pollak as Michael
- Caroline Dhavernas as Loretta
- Catherine Fitch as Sophie
- Tom Barnett as Dave
- Pierre Collin as Claude
- Normand Daneau as Gilles

== Production ==
While some scenes were filmed in Niagara Falls, Ontario, most of the film was filmed in and around Winnipeg, Manitoba. The motel scenes were filmed in Steinbach. Additional scenes were filmed in Lockport and Selkirk, where the real Riverside Grill stood until 2012.

== Reception ==
Rotten Tomatoes gave the film an approval rating of 36% based on 14 reviews, with an average rating of 5.00/10.

Katherine Monk of CanWest News Service panned the film, writing that "good actors without a good script end up working incredibly hard just to make each moment worth watching, and thanks to Crewson's uptight body language, we can almost suspend disbelief long enough to think a middle-aged mom from an affluent suburb would sell herself at a fleabag motel to save her man and her marriage. Then the voice of reason kicks in, and we remember that prostitution does not offer the lifestyle of Pretty Woman but a life dealing with sexually transmitted diseases, violent pimps and potentially homicidal johns. It's not something moms turn to when the bake sale goes bad. Maybe on the stage these monodimensional characters worked some dramatic magic. But on screen, we need nuance -- not broadly drawn theatrics. Besides, every character in Walker's glossary of human experience feels like a cheesy cliche: the man without a job, the wife looking for her marriage, the poor pregnant girl, the grieving alcoholic. We've seen these people a hundred times before in better movies with better intersecting storylines. Director Yates does a decent job pulling the threads of the story together with a unified look and feel to the frames, but when you don't care what happens to the people, you don't generally care what happens in the movie."

Bernard Pérusse of the Montreal Gazette wrote that "if the characters were a bit more engaging and a shade less irritating, Niagara Motel would be firing on all cylinders. Problem is, the film mostly fails to find an element in its people that would make us care enough to hang any hopes on them. Dhavernas and Holden-Ried might come closest, but in the end, you're not hoping to see any of these no-hope characters in a sequel any time soon."

== Awards ==
Yates received a nomination for Best Direction in a Feature Film at the 2006 Directors Guild of Canada awards.

Dhavernas received a Genie Award nomination for a Best Supporting Actress at the 27th Genie Awards in 2007.
