= Antoine Bertrand =

Canadian film and television actor

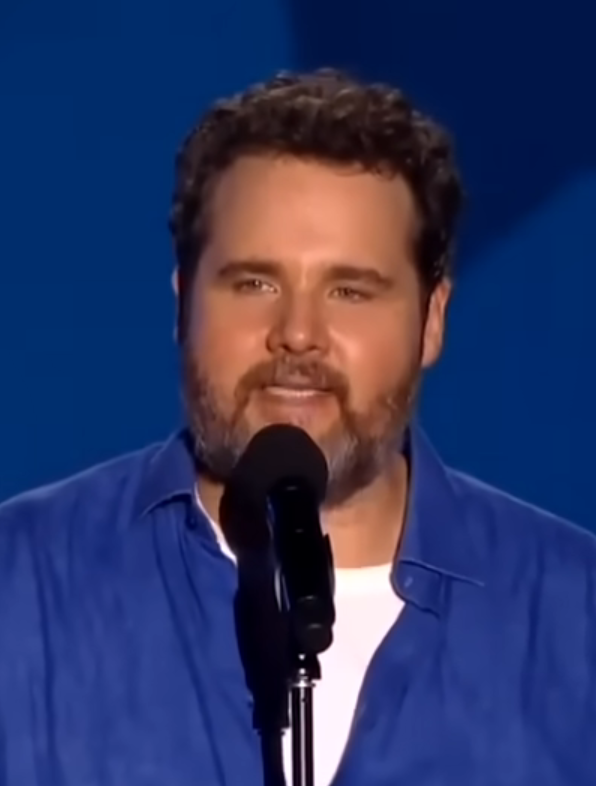
- Antoine Bertrand in 2025
- Born: November 24, 1977 (age 48); Granby, Quebec, Canada
- Occupation: Actor
- Years active: 1996–present
- Partner: Catherine-Anne Toupin (2008–)

Antoine Bertrand (born November 24, 1977) is a Canadian film and television actor. He is best known for his roles in the television series Les Bougon and the films Louis Cyr, a role that earned him the Prix Iris for Best Actor, and Starbuck, for which he garnered a Genie Award nomination for Best Supporting Actor at the 2012 Genie Awards.

== Career ==
Antoine Bertrand became famous from his role as Junior in the popular TV series Les Bougon in 2003. He was also acclaimed for his role as Yannick in the TV series C.A., for which he won a Gémeaux Award in the category “Best Leading Male Role: Comedy.” From 2010 to 2014, he co-hosted the cult show Les enfants de la télé alongside Véronique Cloutier, which earned him two Gémeaux Awards in the category “Best Show Host: Comedy, Variety Series, Game, or Reality Show.” More recently, he has appeared in Boomerang and True North, series for which he has also been awarded. He has numerous credits on the big screen in more than a dozen feature films, including Martin Villeneuve's The 12 Tasks of Imelda (Les 12 travaux d'Imelda), co-starring playwright Robert Lepage and actress-signer Ginette Reno, in which he plays Martin and Denis Villeneuve's cousin Louis.

== Filmography ==
Year	Title	Role	Notes
1996	Virginie	Patrick Bertrand	TV series (1 episode)
2004-06	Les Bougon	Paul 'Junior' Bougon	TV series (49 episodes)
2006-08	Caméra Café	Patrice Labrecque	TV series (15 episodes)
2006-10	C.A.	Yannick Duquette	TV series (52 episodes)
2008	Borderline	Eric	
2008	The Necessities of Life	Roger	
2008	Babine	Ti-Toine	
2008	Château en Suède		TV movie
2008	Collection Fred Vargas	Forestier	TV series (1 episode)
2008	René Levesque	Hairdresser man	TV series (1 episode)
2010	The Hair of the Beast (Le poil de la bête)	Vadeboncoeur	
2011	Starbuck	The Lawyer	Nominated - Genie Award for Best Performance by an Actor in a Supporting Role
2011	Thrill of the Hills (Frisson des collines)	Burger	Nominated - Jutra Award for Best Supporting Actor
2011-12	Les Boys	Ronnie / Roméo	TV series (24 episodes)
2013	Louis Cyr	Louis Cyr	Jutra Award for Best Actor
2013	The Four Soldiers (Les 4 soldats)	Big Max	
2013	Bye Bye	Himself	TV series (1 episode)
2014	The Masters of Suspense (Les Maîtres du suspense)	Quentin Wilson	
2014	Mensonges	Rémi Côté	TV series (1 episode)
2015	Ego Trip	Paul Plante	
2015	La crise du cinéaste québécois		Short
2016	Demain tout commence	Bernie	
2016	Kiss Me Like a Lover (Embrasse-moi comme tu m'aimes)	Réal St-Germain	
2016	Votez Bougon	Junior Bougon	
2016	Le petit locataire	Toussaint	
2016	Les Pays d'en haut	Antoine Labelle	TV series (10 episodes)
2016	Boomerang	Patrick	TV series (12 episodes)
2019	Compulsive Liar (Menteur)	Phil Aubert	
2021	Goodbye Happiness (Au revoir le bonheur)	Thomas	
2022	Three Times Nothing (Trois fois rien)	Brindille	
2022	The 12 Tasks of Imelda (Les 12 travaux d'Imelda)	Louis	
2023	Little Jesus (Petit Jésus)	Jean	
2024	Miss Boots (Mlle Bottine)	Philippe	
2024	STAT	Raphaël St-Vincent	TV series; four episodes
2025	Compulsive Liar 2 (Menteuse)	Phil Aubert	
2025	The Furies (Les Furies)		

== Theater ==
Year	Title
2007	Appelez-moi Stéphane
2009	Le Pillowman
2010	Porc-Épic
2015	Les Intouchables
