= The Fall of the American Empire =

2018 Canadian film

- Film poster
- French: La chute de l'empire américain
- Directed by: Denys Arcand
- Written by: Denys Arcand
- Produced by: Denise Robert
- Starring: Maxim Roy; Yan England; Rémy Girard; Anoulith Sintharaphone; Maripier Morin; Patrick Emmanuel Abellard
- Cinematography: Van Royko
- Edited by: Arthur Tarnowski
- Distributed by: Les Films Séville
- Release date: 28 June 2018 (Quebec)
- Country: Canada
- Language: French

The Fall of the American Empire (French: La chute de l'empire américain) is a 2018 Canadian crime thriller film written and directed by Denys Arcand and starring Alexandre Landry, Maxim Roy, Yan England and Rémy Girard. It is about a man (Landry) who, after an armed robbery in Montreal, discovers two bags of money and is unsure what to do with them. Based on a 2010 Old Montreal shooting, it is thematically related, but not a direct sequel, to Arcand's 1986 The Decline of the American Empire and 2003 The Barbarian Invasions.

The film was released in Quebec on 28 June. It subsequently screened at the 2018 Toronto International Film Festival and at the Valladolid International Film Festival, where it won the FIPRESCI Prize.

== Plot ==
Pierre-Paul Daoust works as a delivery man to pay his bills despite having a PhD in philosophy, believing himself too intelligent to be successful. While working on a delivery in Montreal, he witnesses a robbery that ends in a fatal shootout, leaving two gym bags filled with millions of dollars of cash unguarded on the ground. He rushes to grab the bags and place them in his delivery truck when the police arrive. They question him as a witness before dismissing him. Pierre-Paul rents a storage locker to place the bags and the bulk of the cash, keeping some in his apartment. Not knowing what to do with this amount of money, he sees on the news biker Sylvain "The Brain" Bigras is being released from prison, during which Bigras was also allowed to pursue a Bachelor in Finance. Pierre-Paul approaches Bigras as soon as he is released, asking him to serve as a financial analyst.

Bigras asks Pierre-Paul for papers on his finances, but Pierre-Paul confesses he has only bags of cash. Bigras deduces the money was stolen from the West End Gang, which was keeping its funds in a store owned by banker Vladimir François. Vladimir staged the robbery of his own bank, believing he deserved a better share from the West End Gang; by mistake Vladimir's bodyguard was present, leading to a shootout. The gang searches for its money, torturing gang member Jacmel for information. Meanwhile, Pierre-Paul searches the Internet for an escort and finds Camille Lafontaine, who tempts him by using an alias from Socrates' friend Aspasia. When Lafontaine leaves Pierre-Paul's apartment she runs into police officers Pete La Bauve and Carla McDuff, who are arriving to question Pierre-Paul; the officers recognize her as a high-profile prostitute and question Pierre-Paul about it, noting he could not afford her services. Bigras advises Pierre-Paul not to see Lafontaine anymore, but Pierre-Paul responds he has an "alibi" that Lafontaine is a friend. Lafontaine does not trust Bigras and believes he will take the money; she and Pierre-Paul find the storage locker empty, and La Bauve and McDuff arrive. Lafontaine claims the storage space was for her clothing where, in fact, Bigras had moved the money to his own home, to keep it safe.

Upon hearing of Jacmel's torture and against Bigras' advice, Pierre-Paul orders Jacmel's protection. Meanwhile, the West End Gang informs Vladimir he is responsible for the money as the banker, and subsequently puts a hit on him. Through Lafontaine's connections, Pierre-Paul meets Wilbrod Taschereau, who specializes in tax evasion. Taschereau and Bigras arrange the creation of a faux children's charity as a means to launder the money to Switzerland. The transfers take place as the friends distribute the cash to Taschereau's clients, whose money overseas is in turn transferred to Pierre-Paul. La Bauve and McDuff realize a deal is unfolding but are unable to attend due to a manpower shortage, with most officers attending a student's protest. They later arrest Taschereau for soliciting a minor. La Bauve and McDuff follow Pierre-Paul and Lafontaine to The Street, dedicated to serving the homeless in Montreal, but the officers end up volunteering there alongside Pierre-Paul and Lafontaine while Pierre-Paul talks about income inequality and possible revolution.

== Production ==
=== Development ===
Arcand based the story on an incident in 2010, when two people were killed in an Old Montreal boutique. The incident took place in a clothing store called Flawnego and was suspected as gang-related; Kyle Gabriel, Terrell Lloyd Smith and Carey Isaac Regis were convicted of murder in 2014.

Arcand stated, "I started fantasizing about what happened, why it happened like that, so I started an investigation", researching and compiling articles about the incident in numerous newspapers and magazines. Hypothesizing money is contemporary society's only remaining value, he said, "Then I began thinking about what would happen if a guy found himself with two bags full of money. What could he do with that? What would it mean for him in terms of his place in society?" He also visited cafeterias in the Bordeaux Prison and the Old Brewery Mission homeless centre to research how to depict a scene where food is served.

=== Casting ===
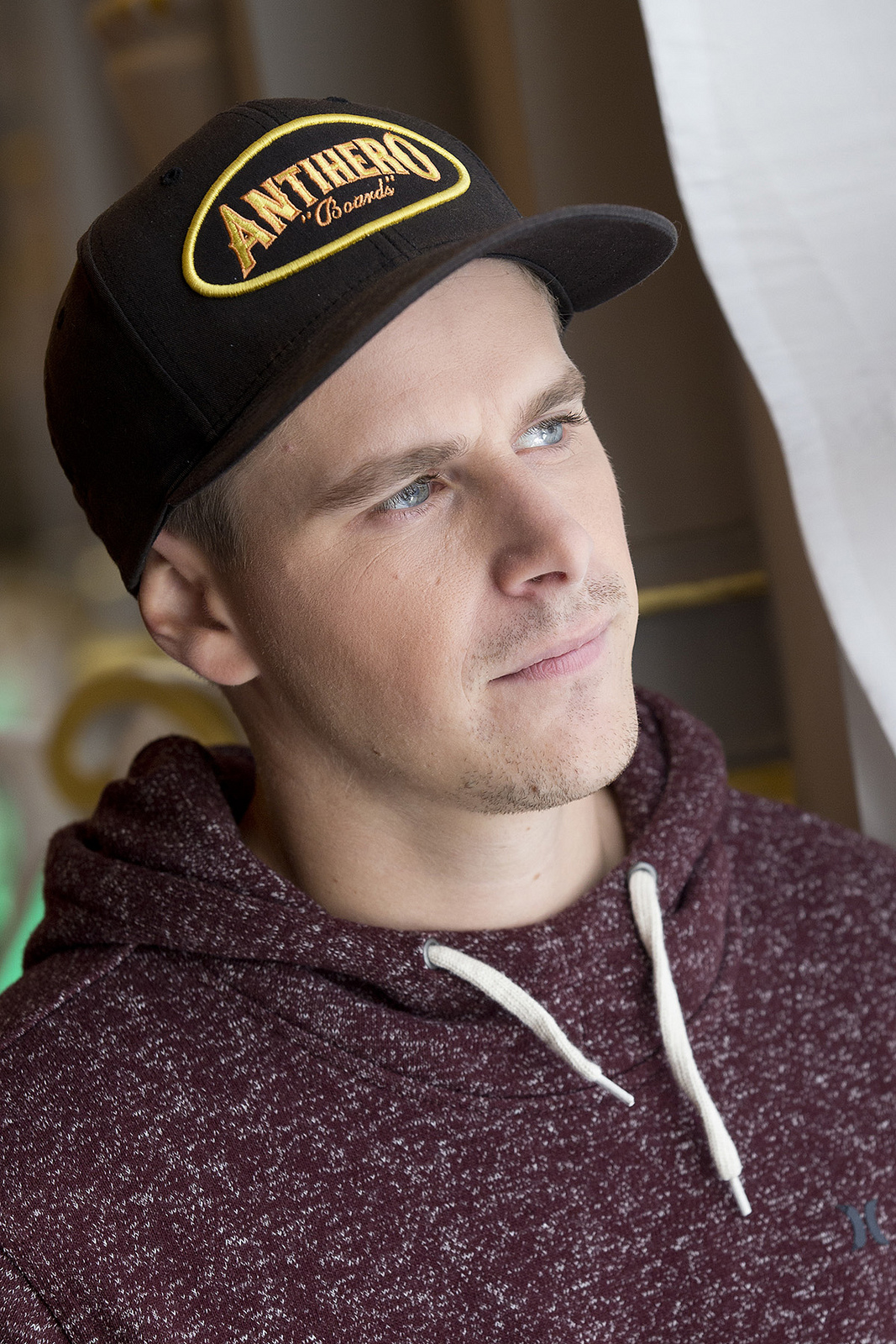
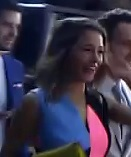
Alexandre Landry and Maripier Morin were cast in the film.

Television host Maripier Morin was cast in the film after three auditions; this was her first film role and she said she was uncertain if Arcand's invitation to appear in the film was serious. Alexandre Landry took the lead role of the McGill University philosophy student who discovers the money, saying he found it "interesting to figure out what the relationship with money in society is".

Eddy King took the role of a gang member, because he said the film would not rely on the stereotype of how gangs are depicted. 19-2 star Maxim Roy joined the cast and performed her own stunts.

=== Filming ===
The filming schedule was set to start on 5 September and was completed on 8 November 2017. Principal photography took place in Montreal.

=== Post-production ===
While the working title was The Triumph of Money (French: Le Triomphe de l'argent), Arcand announced in March that the film would be retitled The Fall of the American Empire to better reflect how the story developed. The new title was reminiscent of his 1986 The Decline of the American Empire.

Arcand said a theme would be how corruption can spread from the United States to Canada, which he said relies on "Pax Americana", a theme explored in The Decline of the American Empire and The Barbarian Invasions (2003). In his view, the U.S. had long been suffering and Quebec was affected. He analogized the current situation with the presidency of Donald Trump to the rule of Roman Emperor Caligula, which could be followed by a Nero figure "and three centuries of inexorable decay".

== Release ==
On 8 March 2018, Seville International previewed The Fall of American Empire with a series of videos, revealing Pierre Curzi would be in the cast. The release was scheduled for 28 June 2018. Arcand also sought to enter the film into the 2018 Cannes Film Festival; Arcand had experience with Cannes. Despite the 28 June release, Les Films Séville and producer Denise Robert announced there would be no release with English subtitles until fall 2018. The Fall of the American Empire was one of 19 Canadian films selected for screening at the 2018 Toronto International Film Festival, while Sony Pictures Classics purchased the U.S. distribution rights.

== Reception ==
=== Critical response ===
On Rotten Tomatoes, the film holds an approval rating of 60% based on 57 reviews, with an average rating of 6.1/10. The site's critical consensus reads, "An ambitious blend of comedy, thriller, and social commentary, The Fall of the American Empire lightens its heavy message with refreshing intelligence and wit." On Metacritic the film has a weighted average score of 55% based on reviews from 17 critics, indicating "mixed or average reviews".

In La Presse, Marc-André Lussier awarded the film three and a half stars, calling it Arcand's best work since The Barbarian Invasions. For Le Journal de Montréal, Isabelle Hontebeyrie assessed the film as jubilant and "pure Arcand", giving it four stars. The Huffington Post's Jean-François Vandeuren criticized the film, comparing it unfavourably to Arcand's previous two works Days of Darkness and An Eye for Beauty, in not fully developing its characters and missing opportunities in the story.

The film finished 2018 as the year's third highest grossing Canadian film.

=== Accolades ===
The Fall of the American Empire won the FIPRESCI Prize at the 63rd Valladolid International Film Festival in October 2018.

Award	Date of ceremony	Category	Recipient(s)	Result	Ref(s)
Prix Iris	2 June 2019	Best Supporting Actor	Vincent Leclerc	Nominated	
Prix Iris	2 June 2019	Revelation of the Year	Maripier Morin	Nominated	
Prix Iris	2 June 2019	Most Successful Film Outside Quebec		Won	
Prix Iris	2 June 2019	Public Prize		Nominated	
Valladolid International Film Festival	October 2018	FIPRESCI Prize		Won	
