= Anne-Élisabeth Bossé =

Canadian actress

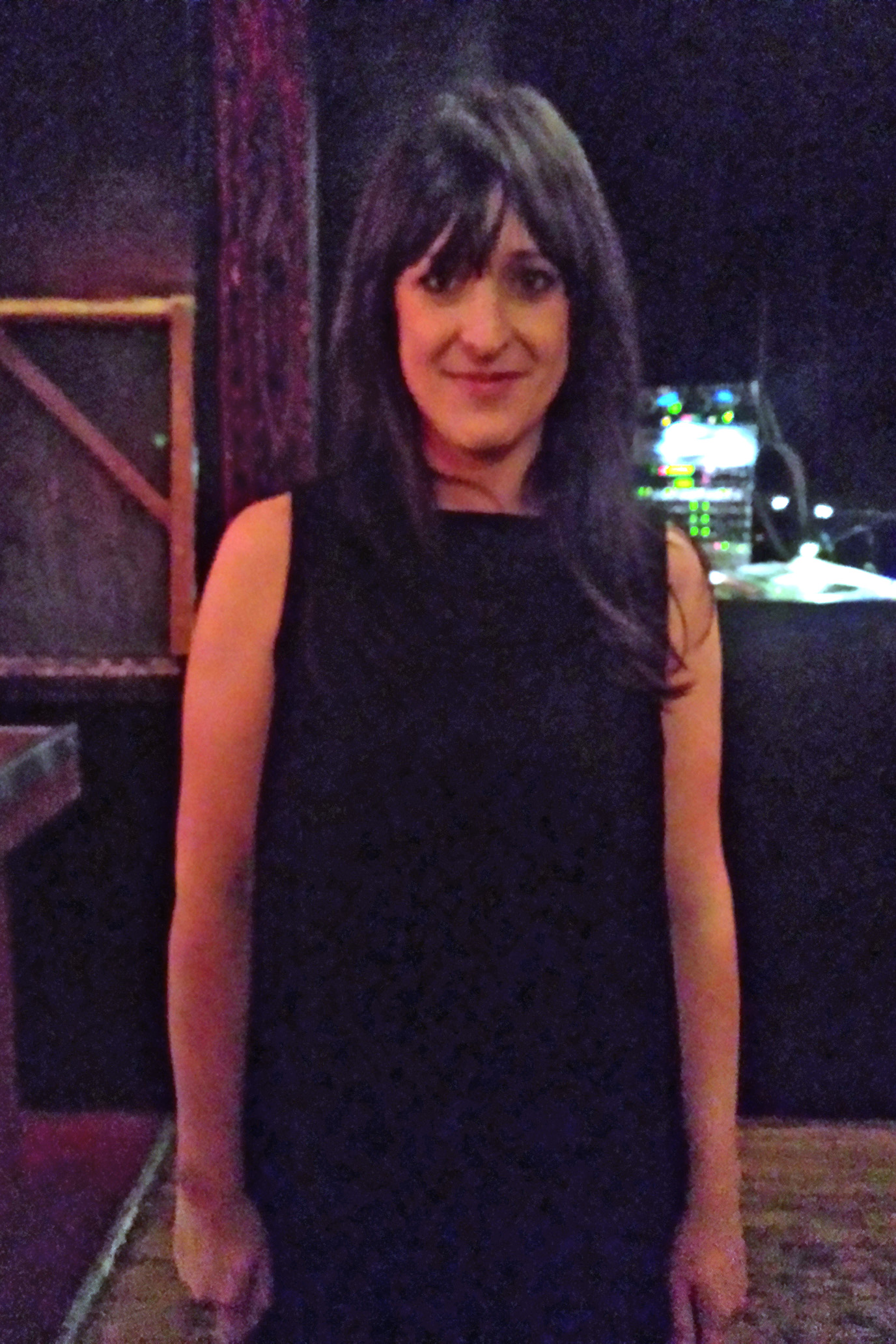
Anne-Élisabeth Bossé in Montreal at La Sala Rossa in 2016.

Anne-Élisabeth Bossé is a Canadian actress from Repentigny, Quebec. She garnered a Genie Award nomination as Best Supporting Actress at the 31st Genie Awards for her performance in Heartbeats (Les Amours imaginaires).

She has also appeared in the television series Série noire and Les Pays d'en haut, and the films Laurence Anyways, Felix and Meira, 9 (9, le film), An Extraordinary Person (Quelqu'un d'extraordinaire), The Passion of Augustine (La passion d'Augustine), Brain Freeze, A Revision (Une révision), The Successor (Le Successeur), Sisters and Neighbors! (Nos belles-sœurs), Vile & Miserable (Vil & Misérable), Compulsive Liar 2 (Menteuse) and The Furies (Les Furies).
