= Émile Gaudreault =

Canadian film director and screenwriter (born 1964)

- Born: March 6, 1964 (age 62); Sainte-Foy, Quebec, Canada
- Occupations: Film director; film producer; screenwriter
- Years active: 1994–present

Émile Gaudreault, (French: [emil ɡodʁol] born March 6, 1964) is a Quebec director, author, screenwriter and producer. Since 1994, he has been directing, writing and producing feature films as well as episodes for television series. Several of his films have won awards in Quebec and Canada and have been adapted for the United States and France.

== Early life ==
Émile Gaudreault was born in Sainte-Foy to a mother who was a teacher and a father who taught theology. During his childhood, he moved to the Lac-Saint-Jean region, first to Lac-à-la-Croix, then to Alma and finally to Jonquière, where he studied art and media technology at Cégep.

== Career ==
Émile Gaudreault made his debut as an author and also on stage, in the comedy shows of the Groupe Sanguin.

For the big screen, he co-wrote Louis 19, King of the Airwaves (French: Louis 19, le roi des ondes), a comedy that was the highest-grossing Canadian film in 1994 and won the Golden Screen Award, in addition to being the subject of an American remake under the title of Edtv (directed by Ron Howard).

In 2001, he directed his first feature film, Wedding Night (French: Nuit de noces), another successful comedy that won the Golden Reel (Genie Award) for the highest-grossing Canadian film.

He then co-wrote and directed Mambo Italiano, released in theatres in 30 countries. The film deals with coming out in the Italian community.

In 2007, he directed Surviving My Mother, which won the prize for the most popular Canadian film at the Montreal World Film Festival.

In 2009, the fourth film he directed, Father and Guns (French: De père en flic), received critical and popular success and as such this film was awarded the Golden Reel Award for the highest-grossing Canadian film.

Then followed A Sense of Humour (French: Le sens de l'humour) in 2011, Le Vrai du Faux in 2014, and Père Fils Thérapie, a remake of De père en flic shot in France with a French cast.

In 2017, he returned with a sequel to Father and Guns 2 (French: De père en flic 2) which won the Golden Screen award for the highest-grossing Canadian film.

In 2018, he was awarded the lifetime achievement Bobine d'or by the Association of Quebec Cinema Owners.

His latest feature film Compulsive Liar (French: Menteur) is released in the summer of 2019 and is named at the end of the same year "Canadian Film of the Year" by Playback Magazine.

In 2017, Émile Gaudreault created his company “Les films du lac” which would be a partner for the production of the films Menteur and Lignes de fuite, feature films which he co-wrote as well. He also co-produced the latter.

By passing the $30 million mark at the box office with the release of Compulsive Liar, a first for Quebec, Gaudreault shows that his cinematic style appeals to Quebec audiences.

In July 2022 will be released a French remake of Compulsive Liar produced by Gaumont and directed by Olivier Baroux (Entre amis, Les Tuche).

== Filmography ==
Year	Title	Director	Writer	Producer
1994	Louis 19, King of the Airwaves (Louis 19, le roi des ondes)	No	Yes	No
2001	Wedding Night (Nuit de noces)	Yes	Yes	No
2003	Mambo Italiano	Yes	Yes	No
2005	Instant Idol (Idole instantanée)	No	Yes	Associate
2009	Father and Guns (De père en flic)	Yes	Yes	No
2011	A Sense of Humour (Le Sens de l'humour)	Yes	Yes	No
2014	Real Lies (Le vrai du faux)	Yes	Yes	No
2015	Ego Trip	No	No	Yes
2017	Father and Guns 2 (De père en flic 2)	Yes	Yes	No
2019	Compulsive Liar (Menteur)	Yes	Yes	No
2022	Lines of Escape (Lignes de fuite)	Yes	Yes	No
2025	Compulsive Liar 2 (Menteuse)	Yes	Yes	Yes

== Accolades ==
Year	Recipient	Award	Category	Ref
1992	Prise 2 (Le Groupe Sanguin)	ADISQ	Billet platine from ADISQ (certifying one hundred thousand tickets sold)	
1994	Louis 19, King of the Airwaves	Canadian Screen Award	Best First Feature	
1994	Louis 19, King of the Airwaves	Golden Reel Award	Top-grossing Canadian film	
1994	Louis 19, King of the Airwaves	Best Canadian Screenplay	Vancouver International Film Festival	
2002	Wedding Night	Golden Reel Award	Top-grossing Canadian film	
2007	Surviving My Mother	Montréal World Film Festival	Most Popular Canadian Feature Film	
2009	Father and Guns	Golden Reel Award	Top-grossing Canadian film	
2017	Father and Guns 2	Golden Reel Award	Top-grossing Canadian film	
2018	Émile Gaudreault	Association of Quebec Cinema Owners	Lifetime achievement	
2020	Émile Gaudreault	La Presse	Person of the year	
2020	Compulsive Liar	Playback Magazine	Canadian Film of the Year	
2020	Compulsive Liar	Canadian Screen Awards	Golden Screen Award for Feature Film	
