= Jean-François Pouliot =

Canadian film director from Quebec (born 1957)

- Born: 1957 (age 68–69); Montreal, Quebec, Canada
- Occupation: Film director
- Years active: 1979 - Present

Jean-François Pouliot (born 1957) is a Canadian film director from Quebec.

He was born in Montreal and studied at Concordia University. He worked as an assistant cameraman, while also writing and directing short animated films for the National Film Board. In 1982, Pouliot joined the advertising firm Cossette Communication Marketing, where he twice won the Grand prix du Mondial de publicité francophone, a French language advertising award. In 1988, he began directing television ads. Pouliot directed a number of episodes of the CBC Television series Emily of New Moon. His films have included Seducing Doctor Lewis (La Grande séduction), The Little Book of Revenge (Guide de la petite vengeance), Glimpses/Impressions, Dr. Cabbie, Snowtime! (La Guerre des tuques 3D), Votez Bougon and The 3 L'il Pigs 2 (Les 3 p'tits cochons 2).
