= Louis 19, King of the Airwaves =

- French: Louis 19, le roi des ondes
- Directed by: Michel Poulette
- Written by: Sylvie Bouchard; Émile Gaudreault; Michel Michaud; Michel Poulette
- Produced by: Jacques Dorfmann; Pierre Laberge
- Starring: Martin Drainville; Agathe de La Fontaine; Dominique Michel; Benoît Brière
- Cinematography: Daniel Jobin
- Edited by: Denis Papillon
- Music by: Jean-Marie Benoît
- Distributed by: Malofilm
- Release date: 1 April 1994
- Running time: 95 minutes
- Country: Canada
- Language: French
- Box office: C$1.8 million (Canada)

Louis 19, King of the Airwaves (French: Louis 19, le roi des ondes) is a Canadian comedy film, released in April 1994.

The film stars Martin Drainville as Louis Jobin, a television fanatic who wins a contest to be on television. Unbeknownst to him, however, his prize is to become a reality show: he is followed around by a cameraman 24 hours a day for three months, and when his life doesn't make for compelling viewing, the show's producers decide to manipulate his life to make the show more exciting.

The film was directed by Michel Poulette, and written by Poulette, Sylvie Bouchard, Michel Michaud and Émile Gaudreault. It won the Golden Reel Award as the year's top-grossing film in Canada.

== Cast ==
- Martin Drainville: Louis Jobin
- Zenhu Han: Sam Ying
- Chantal Fontaine: la reporter
- Gilbert Lachance: Remi
- Jean L'Italien: Roger
- Dominique Michel: Aline Jobin
- Alexandra Boulianne: une chanteuse de la chorale
- Mireille Thibault: une chanteuse de la chorale
- Sylvie Bouchard: une chanteuse de la chorale
- Yves Jacques: Michel Gobeil
- Carol Jones : une gardienne de sécurité
- Patricia Tulasne : Charlotte Dubreuil
- Marcela Seguel : Marie-Laurence Despins
- Stephanie Laplante : scripte télé
- Pierre Paquin : réalisateur télé
- Guillaume Lemay-Thivierge : le technicien de la régie
- Agathe de La Fontaine : Julie Leduc
- Marie-Claude Robitaille: Guylaine
- Sonia Laplante: Josée
- Benoît Brière: Caméraman

== Release ==
The film opened on 34 screens in Quebec on April 1, 1994.

== Reception ==
The film grossed $194,732 in its opening weekend It went on to win the Golden Reel Award for the year's top-grossing film in Canada, even though it was only released in Quebec, with a gross of C$1.8 million.

== Awards ==
The film won the Claude Jutra Award for the best feature film by a first-time Canadian film director. It was also a nominee for Best Motion Picture, but lost to Exotica.

== Remake ==
The 1999 American film EDtv was an adaptation of Louis 19.
