= Sonia Vachon =

Canadian actress

Sonia Vachon (born March 14, 1966, in Magog, Quebec) is a Canadian actress. She is most noted for her performance in the film 5150 Elm's Way (5150, rue des ormes), for which she was both a Genie Award nominee for Best Supporting Actress at the 30th Genie Awards and a Jutra Award nominee for Best Supporting Actress at the 12th Jutra Awards.

She was also a Jutra nominee in the same category at the 1st Jutra Awards in 1999 for It's Your Turn, Laura Cadieux (C't'à ton tour, Laura Cadieux), and at the 14th Jutra Awards in 2012 for A Sense of Humour (Le Sens de l'humour).
