= A Sense of Humour =

- Film poster
- French: Le Sens de l'humour
- Directed by: Émile Gaudreault
- Written by: Émile Gaudreault; Benoît Pelletier
- Produced by: Daniel Louis; Denise Robert
- Starring: Louis-José Houde; Benoît Brière; Michel Côté
- Cinematography: Bernard Couture
- Edited by: Jean-François Bergeron
- Music by: FM Le Sieur
- Production company: Cinémaginaire
- Distributed by: Alliance Vivafilm
- Release date: July 8, 2011
- Running time: 110 minutes
- Country: Canada
- Language: French

A Sense of Humour (French: Le Sens de l'humour) is a Canadian crime comedy film, directed by Émile Gaudreault and released in 2011. The film stars Louis-José Houde and Benoît Brière as Luc Dubé and Marco Fortier, two stand-up comedians who are kidnapped by Roger Gendron (Michel Côté) after making fun of him in a comedy show, and must protect themselves from his revenge by teaching him the art of comedy.

The cast also includes Anne Dorval, Sonia Vachon, Pierrette Robitaille, Alexandre Goyette and Pierre Collin.

The film opened in theatres in July 2011.

The film received four Jutra Award nominations at the 14th Jutra Awards in 2012, for Best Supporting Actress (Vachon), Best Cinematography (Bernard Couture), Best Editing (Jean-François Bergeron) and Best Original Music (FM Le Sieur).
