= Catherine Chabot =

Canadian actress, writer and film director

Catherine Chabot is a Canadian actress, writer and film director. For her performance as Chloé Therrien in the 2019 film Compulsive Liar (Menteur), she received a Prix Iris nomination for Revelation of the Year at the 22nd Quebec Cinema Awards in 2020.

In 2022, she co-wrote, co-directed and starred in Lines of Escape (Lignes de fuite), a film adapted from her own theatrical stage play. In the same year she was cast in the lead role in La Candidate, a television comedy series about a paper candidate who unexpectedly wins election to public office, which was partially based on the experiences of Ruth Ellen Brosseau.

A 2013 graduate of the Conservatoire d'art dramatique de Montréal, she has also appeared in the television series Mon ex à moi, Victor Lessard and Hôtel, and the films The Guide to the Perfect Family (La guide de la famille parfaite) and Follies (Folichonneries).
