= Golden Screen Award (Canada) =

Canadian film award

- Country: Canada
- Presented by: Academy of Canadian Cinema & Television
- First award: 1976
- Currently held by: Compulsive Liar 2 (2025)
- Website: academy.ca/awards

The Golden Screen Award, formerly known as the Golden Reel Award, is a Canadian film award, presented to the Canadian film with the biggest box office gross of the year. The Canadian Motion Picture Distributors Association introduced this award in 1976 as part of the Canadian Film Awards until 1979. The Golden Reel became part of the Genie Awards ceremonies in 1980, and is currently part of the Canadian Screen Awards. It was renamed from Golden Reel to Golden Screen as of the 3rd Canadian Screen Awards in 2015.

As the economics of Canadian film production mean that the year's top-grossing Canadian film is often a francophone film from Quebec, the award often (although not always) went to the same film as the Billet d'or ("Golden Ticket"), which was presented by the Prix Iris to the top-grossing film from Quebec until that award was replaced by the fan-voted Public Prize in 2016.

In 2015, the Academy also introduced Golden Screen Awards for fiction and reality television, to recognize the most-watched Canadian television shows, based on Numeris ratings.

== Winners ==
=== Film ===
- 1976 - Lies My Father Told Me
- 1977 - Why Shoot the Teacher?
- 1978 - Who Has Seen the Wind
- 1979 - not awarded this year
- 1980 - Meatballs
- 1981 - The Changeling
- 1982 - Heavy Metal
- 1983 - Porky's
- 1984 - Strange Brew
- 1985 - The Dog Who Stopped the War (La Guerre des tuques)
- 1986 - The Care Bears Movie
- 1987 - The Decline of the American Empire (Le Déclin de l'empire américain)
- 1988 - The Gate
- 1989 - The Tadpole and the Whale (La Grenouille et la baleine)
- 1990 - Jesus of Montreal
- 1991 - Ding et Dong, le film
- 1992 - Black Robe
- 1993 - La Florida
- 1994 - Louis 19, King of the Airwaves (Louis 19, le roi des ondes)
- 1995 - not awarded this year
- 1996 - Crash/Johnny Mnemonic
- 1997 - Air Bud
- 1998 - Les Boys
- 1999 - Les Boys II
- 2000 - The Art of War
- 2001 - Wedding Night (Nuit de noces)
- 2002 - Les Boys III
- 2003 - Séraphin: Heart of Stone (Séraphin: Un homme et son péché)
- 2004 - Resident Evil: Apocalypse
- 2005 - C.R.A.Z.Y.
- 2006 - Bon Cop, Bad Cop
- 2007 - The 3 L'il Pigs (Les 3 p'tits cochons)
- 2008 - Passchendaele
- 2009 - Father and Guns (De père en flic)
- 2010 - Resident Evil: Afterlife
- 2011 - Starbuck
- 2012 - Resident Evil: Retribution
- 2013 - The Mortal Instruments: City of Bones
- 2014 - Pompeii
- 2015 - Snowtime! (La Guerre des tuques 3D)
- 2016 - The 3 L'il Pigs 2 (Les 3 p'tits cochons 2)
- 2017 - Father and Guns 2 (De père en flic 2)
- 2018 - 1991
- 2019 - Compulsive Liar (Menteur)
- 2021 - PAW Patrol: The Movie
- 2022 - Two Days Before Christmas (23 décembre)
- 2023 - PAW Patrol: The Mighty Movie
- 2024 - Sisters and Neighbors! (Nos belles-sœurs)
- 2025 - Compulsive Liar 2 (Menteuse)

=== Television ===
- 2014 - Rookie Blue (fiction), The Amazing Race Canada (reality)
- 2015 - Corner Gas: The Movie (fiction), The Amazing Race Canada (reality)
- 2016 - Murdoch Mysteries (fiction), The Amazing Race Canada (reality)
- 2017 - Murdoch Mysteries (fiction), The Amazing Race Canada (reality)
- 2018 - The Indian Detective (fiction), The Amazing Race Canada (reality)
- 2019 - Murdoch Mysteries and Private Eyes (fiction), The Amazing Race Canada (reality)

== See also ==
- Prix Iris Public Prize
