= Les Bougon =

Canadian television series

- Genre: Comedy
- Created by: François Avard; Jean-François Mercier
- Starring: Rémy Girard; Louison Danis; Claude Laroche
- Country of origin: Canada
- Original language: French

Production
- Producer: Fabienne Larouche

Original release
- Network: Radio-Canada
- Release: January 7, 2004 – April 17, 2006

Les Bougon - c'est aussi ça la vie! is a Quebec sitcom broadcast by Radio-Canada from 2004 to 2006, written by François Avard and Jean-François Mercier and produced by Fabienne Larouche. The show won three Gémeaux in 2004. The show's first episode aired on January 7, 2004, and the last one aired on April 17, 2006. It was adapted for French television by M6.

A feature film adaptation, Votez Bougon, was released to theatres in 2016.

== Overview ==
The show follows the antics of the Bougon family, who have sworn to do anything they can to cheat the system. They plan all sorts of schemes to scam money out of normal citizens and businesses. This is usually easily accomplished thanks to their many accomplices, who are just as crooked as they are.

== Main characters ==
=== Paul Bougon (Rémy Girard) ===
Paul is the brains of the family. His current lifestyle is the result of being disillusioned after attempting to denounce illegal trafficking at the harbour where he worked, only to be told to keep quiet by his union, his bosses, and the judicial system. Ever since, he has adopted an openly defiant attitude against the rules of good citizenship and expects his family to follow suit.

=== Rita "Tita" Bougon (Louison Danis) ===
Rita is Paul's vulgar, alcoholic, chain-smoking wife. Although she spends a minimum amount of time cooking and cleaning, she maintains an unconditional love for her family and adopts the same defiant attitude as her husband. She has no qualms about doing whatever she wants no matter how inappropriate the behaviour.

=== Paul Bougon Junior (Antoine Bertrand) ===
As the aspiring star of the family, obese "Junior" fervently puts his father's teachings into action and attempts the most outrageous stunts he can think of. While he is a successful crook, he has little education or culture, and his lifestyle doesn't appeal to the women he tries to attract. He has often shown his lack of common sense, logic, and reading skills and often misuses words to funny effect. He also lacks a sense of social decorum, burping in the face of anyone, even women he's attracted to. Despite his idiocy, he has a good heart and is very protective of all the members in his family.

One of the reasons for his lower level of intelligence and his learning difficulties could be that Rita smoked and consumed beer throughout her pregnancy, as she explains later to a pregnant Dolorès.

=== Frédéric "Mononc" Bougon (Claude Laroche) ===
As the only family member to attempt to get back into the system, he is often the butt of jokes, especially due to his idealistic views about the world. His attempts at getting a real job always fall flat as he realizes his co-workers also follow the Bougon lifestyle. He is constantly disappointed that people are not as honest as he would like to believe they are. Throughout the series, he consistently fails at most things he attempts, such as finding and keeping a job — he usually gets fired for being too "good" — or even trying to commit suicide. Despite how much the family dislike him, they still manage to show him their affection at appropriate times, such as when Paul, after reading his suicide note, scolds him and tells him that he "won't take away his only brother."

=== Dolorès "Dodo" Bougon (Hélène Bourgeois Leclerc) ===
A low-dollar prostitute, "Dodo" is several years older than Junior. She has a reputation for bringing work home after her shift; a running gag is that she's always followed by a different man (or, on one occasion, a woman) as she comes out of her bedroom each morning. Easily swayed by instant pleasure and gratification, she sometimes deals drugs behind her parents' backs, but is discovered the two critical times she's had any. She once joined a cult that she was brainwashed to think was a religious group that believed in "srevinu", the universe's mirror. It ended up being nothing more than a sex-based sect. Paul and Rita managed to get her out. Of all the family members, she's one of the least supportive. She once answered her brother Junior's threat of committing suicide by questioning if she was the only normal family member.

=== Mao Bougon (Rosalee Jacques) ===
Mao is an adopted Chinese child, who was considered an investment by the family. They believed an Asian kid would know about computers, hacking, and the Internet. Mao loves the family and considers their lifestyle to be nothing but a big, fun game. She skips school to take part in her siblings' escapades. During the first season, Mao was thought to be a boy, but during that season's final episode, it was learned that she is a girl. We learn in the second season that she was lovingly adopted by Paul Bougon when he worked the night shift in the Port of Montréal. One night, he heard moaning and gasping from a ship container arriving from China and discovered fifteen Chinese stowaway refugees dying or dead from asphyxiation and starvation. Mao's mother was still alive when Paul delivered the girl but died seconds after giving birth. Paul brought the infant home and raised her as his own child.

=== Léo "Pépère" Bougon (Pierre Ébert) ===
Leo was known as "Pépère" to the immediate family, until his death in 2004. He never spoke, in fact spending all his time in a wheelchair in a state of vegetation, usually hunched over, eyes nearly always closed, and mumbling incomprehensibly.

=== Beaudoin (André Lacoste) ===
The straitlaced landlord of the duplex occupied by the Bougons is constantly aggravated by their shenanigans. More than once, he has attempted to sell the house just to evict them.

=== Ben Laden, the family pet ===
Ben is a little dusty white dog (whose name is derived from Osama bin Laden) who isn't really appreciated by anyone but Paul Senior. He is permitted to do pretty much whatever he wants, whether eating on the counters or drinking beer. He understands human speech; he growls at Fred for having referred to Bin Laden negatively in his TV scripts. He is also the legal owner of the Bougons' fraudulent construction company.

== See also ==
- Trailer Park Boys
