= Father and Guns 2 =

- French: De père en flic 2
- Directed by: Émile Gaudreault
- Written by: Eric K. Boulianne; Émile Gaudreault; Sébastien Ravary
- Produced by: Denise Robert
- Starring: Michel Côté; Louis-José Houde; Karine Vanasse; Patrice Robitaille
- Cinematography: Geneviève Perron
- Edited by: Arthur Tarnowski
- Music by: FM Le Sieur
- Production company: Cinémaginaire
- Release date: September 13, 2017
- Running time: 117 minutes
- Country: Canada
- Language: French

Father and Guns 2 (French: De père en flic 2) is a Canadian comedy film originating from Quebec, directed by Émile Gaudreault and released in 2017. A sequel to the 2009 film Father and Guns (De père en flic), the film reunites Michel Côté and Louis-José Houde as feuding father and son police officers Jacques and Marc Laroche, placing them in an undercover assignment at a couples therapy camp.

The film's cast also includes Karine Vanasse, Patrice Robitaille, Julie Le Breton, Sonia Vachon, Yves Jacques, Philippe-Audrey Larrue-Saint-Jacques and Alexandre Landry.

== Awards ==
The film was named the winner of the Golden Screen Award as the highest-grossing Canadian film of the year, at the 6th Canadian Screen Awards.
