= Poverty and Other Delights =

- French: Joyeux Calvaire
- Directed by: Denys Arcand
- Written by: Claire Richard
- Produced by: Denise Robert
- Starring: Benoît Brière; Gaston Lepage
- Cinematography: Guy Dufaux
- Edited by: André Daignault
- Music by: Yves Laferrière
- Release date: November 29, 1996
- Running time: 89 minutes
- Country: Canada
- Language: French

Poverty and Other Delights (French: Joyeux Calvaire) is a Canadian drama film from Quebec, directed by Denys Arcand and released in 1996. The film stars Benoît Brière and Gaston Lepage as Joseph and Marcel, two homeless men living on the streets of Montreal.

The film was written by Claire Richard, a volunteer with a housing assistance program in Montreal. It was originally intended as a television film for Télévision de Radio-Canada.
