= Arthur Tarnowski =

Canadian film and television editor

Arthur Tarnowski (born January 20, 1971, in Montreal, Quebec) is a Canadian film and television editor. He is most noted as a three-time Canadian Screen Award nominee for Best Editing, receiving nominations at the 3rd Canadian Screen Awards in 2015 for Henri Henri, at the 7th Canadian Screen Awards in 2019 for The Hummingbird Project, and at the 9th Canadian Screen Awards in 2021 for The Decline (Jusqu'au déclin).

He also received a nomination for Best Picture Editing in a Dramatic Program or Series at the 5th Canadian Screen Awards in 2017 for his work on 19–2, and three Jutra/Iris nominations for Best Editing, for Duo at the 9th Jutra Awards in 2007, for Whitewash at the 16th Jutra Awards in 2014, and for The Decline at the 23rd Quebec Cinema Awards in 2021. At the 2022 Whistler Film Festival, he won the Borsos Competition award for Best Editing in a Borsos Competition Film for his work on The 12 Tasks of Imelda (Les 12 travails d'Imelda).

His other credits have included the films Emotional Arithmetic, Adam's Wall, The Wild Hunt, The Trotsky, Good Neighbours, The Kate Logan Affair, French Immersion, The Legend of Sarila, The Military Man (Le Militaire), Father and Guns 2 (De père en flic 2), The Fall of the American Empire (La chute de l'empire américain), Compulsive Liar (Menteur), Best Sellers, Drunken Birds (Les Oiseaux ivres), Irena's Vow and Sisters and Neighbors! (Nos belles-sœurs), and the television series Back to Sherwood, Largo Winch, 15/Love, Grand Star, Being Human and Bad Blood.
