= Louis-José Houde =

French-Canadian actor and comedian (born 1977)

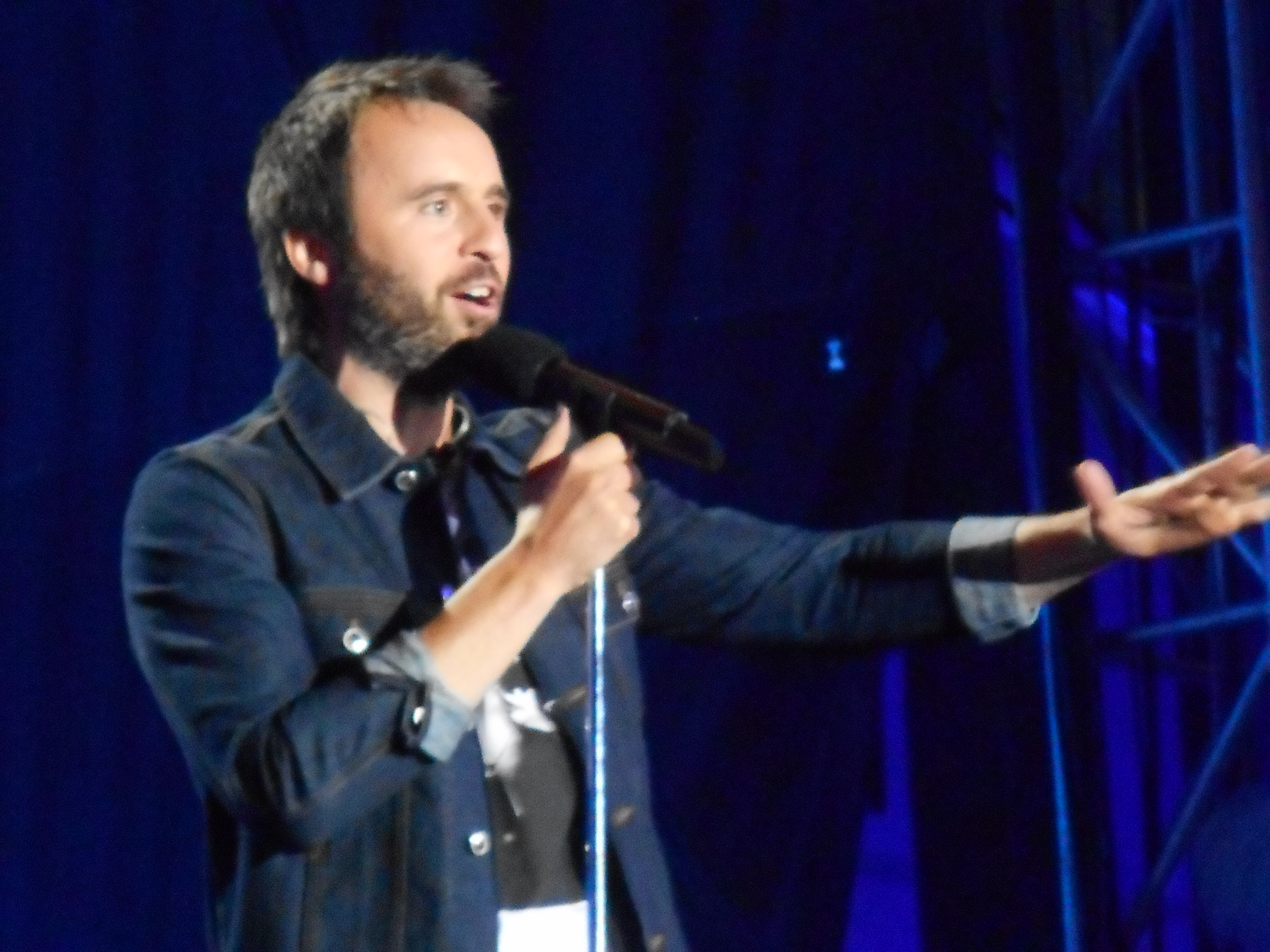
- Born: October 19, 1977 (age 48); Saint-Apollinaire, Quebec
- Occupations: actor, comedian
- Years active: 2000s-present
- Notable work: Father and Guns, A Sense of Humour, Compulsive Liar

Louis-José Houde (born October 19, 1977 in Saint-Apollinaire, Quebec) is a French-Canadian actor and comedian. He is best known for his performances in films such as Bon Cop, Bad Cop in 2006, Father and Guns (De père en flic) in 2009, A Sense of Humour (Le Sens de l'humour) in 2011 and Compulsive Liar (Menteur) in 2019.

Houde has hosted two TV shows on Radio-Canada: Louis-José Houde, à suivre... (2005) and Ici Louis-José Houde (2006). In 2003, he won a Félix Award for comic show of the year.

He championed Un petit pas pour l'homme by Stéphane Dompierre in Le combat des livres 2006.

He is a graduate of Quebec's École nationale de l'humour.

== Personal life ==
He was in a relationship with actress Magalie Lépine-Blondeau until the couple announced their separation in early 2019.
