= Cinémaginaire =

Canadian film production company

Cinémaginaire is a Canadian film production company. The company is based in Montreal, Quebec, Canada and is headed by co-founders Denise Robert, who serves as president and Daniel Louis, who serves as vice president.
