= Daniel Louis =

Canadian film producer (born 1953)

- Born: October 12, 1953 (age 71); Montreal, Quebec, Canada
- Occupation: film producer
- Known for: Cinémaginaire, The Barbarian Invasions

Daniel Louis (born October 12, 1953) is a Canadian film producer. He is co-founder, with Denise Robert, of Cinémaginaire.

He has earned two Genie Awards, among other nominations, including the Genie Award for Best Motion Picture for The Barbarian Invasions (shared with Robert and Fabienne Vonier) and a Golden Reel Award for Wedding Night (Nuit de noces) (shared with Robert).
