= FM Le Sieur =

Canadian musician and composer

- Born: François Maurice Le Sieur; Saint-Jean-sur-Richelieu, Quebec
- Occupations: Composer, musician
- Website: http://fmlesieur.com

François Maurice Le Sieur is a Canadian musician and composer. He has been nominated for awards for television and film music in his native Canada, that include garnering seven Gemini award wins and seven additional nominations; one Genie award nomination; and three Jutra award nominations.

== Life and work ==
He studied at Collège Marguerite-Bourgeoys and at McGill University, where he became inspired from a master class with Philip Glass. In the 1980s he was part of the rock band Tango Tango, before moving into television and film scoring.

His career has spanned over fifteen years, and his other work includes Tony and Ridley Scott’s series The Hunger starring David Bowie; the films of Alain DesRochers, his long-time collaborator, beginning with The Bottle (La Bouteille); and television series Musée Eden, Nos Étés, Music Hall, Les Soeurs Elliot, Les Bougon, and Charlie Jade, an international co-production filmed in South Africa.

Le Sieur scored three films that premiered in 2011: drama Thrill of the Hills (Frisson des collines); comedy A Sense of Humour (Le sens de l'humour); and biopic of Quebec rock star Gerry Boulet, Gerry, for which Le Sieur remastered Boulet’s original tracks.

Le Sieur won an ASCAP award in 2012 for his work on Being Human, a North American version of the British show of the same name.

== Awards ==
Year	Award	Category	
2013	Gemini Awards	Won	Best Original Music - Dramatic (Meilleure musique originale: Dramatique) for Tu m'aimes-tu? (2012) (TV series).
2013	Gemini Awards	Won	Best Musical Theme - All Categories (Meilleur thème musical: Toutes catégories) for Tu m'aimes-tu? (2012) (TV series).
2012	Jutra Awards	Nominated	Best Score (Meilleure Musique Originale) for A Sense of Humour (Le sens de l'humour) (2011) (feature film).
2010	Gemini Awards	Won	Original Music for a Program or Series - Dramatic (Meilleure musique originale pour une émission ou une série: Dramatiques) for Musée Eden (2010).
2009	Gemini Awards	Nominated	Best Original Music - Dramatic (Meilleure musique originale: Dramatique) for Les Sœurs Elliot (2007).
2009	Gemini Awards	Nominated	Best Musical Theme - All Categories (Meilleur thème musical: Toutes catégories) for Les Sœurs Elliot (2007).
2008	Gemini Awards	Nominated	Best Original Music - Dramatic (Meilleure musique originale: Dramatique) for C.A. (2006) (series).
2008	Gemini Awards	Nominated	Best Musical Theme - All Categories (Meilleur thème musical: Toutes catégories) for Les Sœurs Elliot (2007) (series).
2008	Jutra Awards	Nominated	Best Achievement in Music Written for Motion Pictures, Original Score for Nitro (2007).
2004	Gemini Awards	Won	Best Musical Theme - All Categories (Meilleur thème musical: Toutes catégories) for Les Bougon: C'est aussi ça la vie (2004).
2004	Genie Awards	Nominated	Best Achievement in Music - Original Song for Mambo Italiano (2003) • For the song "Montréal Italiano". Shared With: Broughton, Adam James, Dompierre, Jeanne, Steve Galluccio
2004	Jutra Awards	Nominated	Best Score (Meilleure Musique) for Mambo Italiano (2003).
