= List of Elle Québec cover models =

This list of Elle Québec cover models (1989–present) is a catalog of cover models who have appeared on the cover of Elle Québec, the Québécois edition of French fashion magazine Elle.

== 1980s ==
=== 1989 ===
Issue	Cover model	Photographer
September	Linda Evangelista	
October	Andrea Battersby	
November		
December		

== 1990s ==
=== 1990 ===
Issue	Cover model	Photographer
January		
February	Estelle Lefébure	
March	Alexandra aubin	
April	Estelle Lefébure	
May	Yasmeen Ghauri	
June		
July	Danelle Scott	
August	Claudia Schiffer	
September	Linda Evangelista	
October		
November	Audrey Benoît	
December	Michele Chalupka	

=== 1991 ===
Issue	Cover model	Photographer
January		
February	Audrey Benoit	
March		
April	Debbie Smallback	
May		
June	Yasmeen Ghauri	
July	Estelle Lefébure	
August	Ebba Elmér	
September		
October	Emma Wiklund	
November	Claudia Schiffer, Lothaire Bluteau	
Happy Parties (December/January 1992)	Catherine McCord	

=== 1992 ===
Issue	Cover model	Photographer
February		
March	Nadine Hennelly	
April	Toneya Bird	
May	Claudia Schiffer	
June	Cindy Crawford	
July		
August		
September		
October		
November		
December		

=== 1993 ===
Issue	Cover model	Photographer
January	Claudia Schiffer	
February	Macha Grenon	
March		
April		
May	Beth Gondek	
June		
July		
August	Amber Valletta	
September	Manon von Gerkan	
October		
November	Roy Dupuis	
December		

=== 1994 ===
Issue	Cover model	Photographer
January	Tatjana Patitz	
February	Eve Salvail	
March	Carmen Schwartz	
April		
May	Lynsey Parker	
June		
July	Claudia Schiffer	
August	Kim Renneberg	
September	Shawna Bowen, , Alie Cross	
October		
November	Claudia Schiffer	Nikko Kefalas
December		

=== 1995 ===
Issue	Cover model	Photographer
January	Anouk Baijings	
February	Ève Salvail	
March		
April		
May	Estelle Lefébure	
June	Nicole Vissers	
July	Meghan Douglas ??	
August	Danielle Zinaich	
September		
October		
November	Gina Marie di Pietro-Reilly	
December		

=== 1996 ===
Issue	Cover model	Photographer
January	Marina Orsini	
February	Clare Mulholland	
March	Linda Evangelista	
April		
May		
June		
July		
August		
September		
October	Unknown, Genevieve Brabant	
November		
December		

=== 1997 ===
Issue	Cover model	Photographer
January		
February	Pascale Bussières	
March		
April		
May		
June	Micha Powell, Rosey Edeh	
July	Avalon Hodges	
August		
September		
October		
November		
December		

=== 1998 ===
Issue	Cover model	Photographer
January	Zofia Borucka	
February	Almudena Fernandez, Martina Klein, Veronica Blume & Vanessa Lorenzo	
March	Laetitia Casta	
April	Unknown, Magali Amadei, Unknown	
May	Cindy Crawford	
June	Shiraz Tal	
July	Helena Dahlquist	
August	Blanca Romero, Helena Dahlquist	
September	Dominique Laniel	
October		
November		
December	Nicole Maddox Grayson	

=== 1999 ===
Issue	Cover model	Photographer
January	Marie Eve Nadeau	
February	Lonneke Engel ??	
March	Renee Lacombe	
April		
May	Laetitia Casta	
June	Eva Herzigova	
July	Kim Lemanton	Raphael Mazzucco
August	Lonneke Engel	Gilles Bensimon
September	Claude Meunier, Anthony Kavanagh; Sophie Lorain; utm, Renée Lacombe	
October		
November	Dominique Laniel	
December	Kristeen Arnold	

== 2000s ==
=== 2000 ===
Claudelle Perreault (2), Elizabeth Hurley, Monica Vaughan, Uma Thurman, Gisele Bundchen, Laetitia Casta, Garou, Linda Nyvltova

Issue	Cover model	Photographer
January		
February		
March		
April		
May		
June		
July		
August		
September		
October		
November		
December		

=== 2001 ===
Madonna, Gwyneth Paltrow, Rachel Roberts

Issue	Cover model	Photographer
January	Christy Turlington	Gilles Bensimon
February		
March	Daria Werbowy	
April		
May		
June		
July		
August		
September		
October		
November		
December		

=== 2002 ===
Jennifer Aniston, Véronique Cloutier, Céline Dion, Pascale Bussières, Jennifer Lopez, Patrick Huard, Jodie Foster, Marie-Eve Nadeau (2)

Issue	Cover model	Photographer
January		
February		
March		
April		
May		
June		
July		
August		
September		
October		
November		
December		

=== 2003 ===
Issue	Cover model	Photographer
January	Linda Nyvltona	
February	Nicole Kidman	
March	Marie-Eve Nadeau	
April	Renee Zellwegger	
May	Carolyn Murphy	
June	Isabelle Blais	
July	Heidi Klum	
August	Charlize Theron	
September		
October	David La Haye	
November	Gisele Bundchen	
December		

=== 2004 ===
Issue	Cover model	Photographer
January		
February	Isabelle Boulay	
March	Vanessa Perron	
April	Britney Spears	
May	Cameron Diaz	
June	Caroline Dhavernas	
July	Scarlett Johansson	
August	Heidi Klum	
September		
October	Lynda Lemay	
November		
December	Kate Winslet	

=== 2005 ===
Issue	Cover model	Photographer
January	Pascale Bussières	
February	Anne Dorval, Marc Labrèche	
March	Vanessa Perron	
April		
May	Uma Thurman	
June	Jorane	
July	Natalie Portman	
August	Hélène Bourgeois Leclerc	
September	Marla Boehr	
October	Luc Picard	
November	Kirsten Dunst	
December	Angelina Jolie	

=== 2006 ===
Issue	Cover model	Photographer
January	Lucie Laurier	
February	Karine Vanasse	
March	Madonna	
April	Jennifer Aniston	
May	Stéphanie Lapointe	
June	France Beaudoin	
July		
August	Céline Bonnier	
September	Avril Lavigne	
October	Marc André Grondin	
November	Hilary Swank	
December	Evangeline Lilly	

=== 2007 ===
Issue	Cover model	Photographer
January	Elisapie Isaac	
February	Catherine Trudeau, Céline Galipeau, Chloé Sainte-Marie, Suzanne Clément	
March	Irina Lăzăreanu	
April	Demi Moore	
May	Anne Dorval, Marc Labrèche, Macha Grenon	
June	Gwen Stefani	
July	Linda Evangelista	
August		Emmanuelle Hauguel
September	Zoe Duchesne	
October	Stéphane Rousseau	
November	Elizabeth Hurley	
December	Julie Perreault	

=== 2008 ===
Issue	Cover model	Photographer
January	IMA / Marie-Andrée Bergeron	
February	Marie-Hélène Thibert	
March	Isabelle Blais	
April	Macha Limonchik	
May		
June	Fernanda Tavares	
July	Scarlett Johansson	
August		
September	Coco Rocha	
October	Sébastien Ricard	
November	Christina Aguilera	
December	Véronique Cloutier	

=== 2009 ===
Issue	Cover model	Photographer
January	Anne Hathaway	
February	Mariloup Wolfe, Guillaume Lemay-Thivierge	
March	Gisele Bundchen	
April	Kate Winslet	
May	Mini Andén	
June	Laurence Leboeuf	
July	Anne Dorval	
August	Rachel Roberts	
September	Hélène Florent	
October	Audrey Tautou	
November	Patrick Huard	
December	Penelope Cruz	

== 2010s ==
=== 2010 ===
Issue	Cover model	Photographer
January - February	Isabel Richer	
March	Valentina Zelyaeva	
April	Sophie Cadieux	
May	Megan Fox	
June	Marie-Andrée Bergeron / IMA	
July	Mateja Penava	
August	Coeur de pirate	
September	Daria Werbowy	
October	Hilary Rhoda	
November	Montreal Canadiens hockey players: Andrei Markov, Maxim Lapierre, Michael Cammalleri (double page with Hal Gill, Brian Gionta)	
December		

=== 2011 ===
Issue	Cover model	Photographer
January	Ali Stephens	
February	Julie Bélanger	
March	Mitsou	
April	Marie-Mai	
May	Coco Rocha	
June	Hélène Bourgeois Leclerc	
July	Taryn Davidson	
August	Isabelle Blais	
September	Adele	
October	Vanessa Paradis	
November	François Arnaud	
December	Mariloup Wolfe	

=== 2012 ===
Issue	Cover model	Photographer
January	Charlotte Le Bon	
February	Evelyne Brochu	
March	Anais Pouliot	
April	utm, Maye Musk	
May	Coeur de pirate	
June	Suzanne Clément	
July	Rachelle Lefevre	
August	Véronique Cloutier, Louis Morissette	
September	Liisa Winkler	
October		
November	Stéphane Archambault	
December	Caroline Dhavernas	

=== 2013 ===
Issue	Cover model	Photographer
January	Marion Cotillard	Alexei Hay
February	Karine Vanasse	Leda & St-Jacques
March	Jessica Paré	John van der Schilden
April	Jessica Chastain	Yu Tsai
May	Justine LeGault	Geneviève Charbonneau
June	Amanda Laine	Leda & St-Jacques
July	Natalia Borges	
August	Sarah-Jeanne Labrosse	John Londono
September	Anais Pouliot	Raphael Mazzucco
October	Sophie Desmarais	Leda & St-Jacques
November	Claude Legault	Jean-Claude Lussier
December	Evelyne Brochu	Geneviève Charbonneau

=== 2014 ===
Issue	Cover model	Photographer
January	Georgia May Jagger	Max Abadian
February	Magalie Lépine-Blondeau	
March	Mélissa Désormeaux-Poulin	Leda & St-Jacques
April	Miley Cyrus	Jan Welters
May	Charlotte Cardin	Leda & St-Jacques
June	Ashley Graham	Leda & St-Jacques
July	Laurence Leboeuf	John Londono
August	Eugenie Bouchard	Leda & St-Jacques
September	Véronic DiCaire	Leda & St-Jacques
October	Pamela Bernier; Sophie Touchet; Chantale Nadeau; Ève Salvail; Jessiann Gravel	Bryan Adams
November	Éric Bruneau	Leda & St-Jacques
December	Maripier Morin	Leda & St-Jacques

=== 2015 ===
Issue	Cover model	Photographer
January	Anne Hathaway	Kai Z. Feng
February	Marilou, Alexandre Champagne	Max Abadian
March	Emma Watson	Kerry Hallihan
April	Léane Labrèche-Dor; Katherine Levac; Virginie Fortin	Geneviève Charbonneau
May	Lucie von Eugen	Jeroen W. Mantel
June	Julie Perreault	Leda & St-Jacques
July	Anais Pouliot	Leda & St-Jacques
August	Julie Le Breton	Geneviève Charbonneau
September	Cœur de pirate	Max Abadian
October	Julie Snyder	Jean-Claude Lussier
November	Catherine-Anne Toupin	Leda & St-Jacques
December	Marie-Mai	Geneviève Charbonneau

=== 2016 ===
Issue	Cover model	Photographer
January	Sarah-Jeanne Labrosse	Max Abadian
February	Taylor Swift	Michael Thompson
March	Karine Vanasse	Max Abadian
April	Miley Cyrus	Matt Irwin
May	Beyoncé	Paola Kudacki
June	Les Sœurs Boulay	Geneviève Charbonneau
July	Kate Bock	Max Abadian
August	Charlotte Cardin	Malina Corpadean
September	Magalie Lépine-Blondeau	Leda & St-Jacques
October	Caroline Dhavernas	Nelson Simoneau
November	Charlotte Le Bon	Marcin Tyszka
December	Lucie Laurier	Nelson Simoneau

=== 2017 ===
Issue	Cover model	Photographer
January	Marie-Mai	Malina Corpadean
February	Mylène Mackay	Max Abadian
March	Caroline Néron	Malina Corpadean
April	Emma Watson	Kerry Hallihan
May	Sophie Grégoire Trudeau	Nelson Simoneau
June	Vita Mir	Max Abadian
July/August	Nelly Furtado	Nelson Simoneau
September	Sophie Nélisse	Nelson Simoneau
October	Julia Roberts	Tom Munro
November	Maripier Morin	Leda & St-Jacques
December	Jessica Chastain	Max Abadian

=== 2018 ===
Issue	Cover model	Photographer
January	Anne Dorval	Leda & St-Jacques
February	Natalie Portman	David Bellemere
March	Penélope Cruz	Nico Bustos
April	Christine Beaulieu	Leda & St-Jacques
May	Cœur de pirate	Nelson Simoneau
June	Mariana Mazza	Leda & St-Jacques
July/August	Kim Kardashian	Boo George
September	Sarah-Jeanne Labrosse	Max Abadian
October	Ariane Moffatt	Malina Corpadean
November	Jennifer Lawrence	Mark Seliger
December/January 2019	Sonia Benezra	Max Abadian

=== 2019 ===
Issue	Cover model	Photographer
February	Macha Grenon	Leda & St-Jacques
March	Anick Lemay	Leda & St-Jacques
April	Guylaine Tremblay	Leda & St-Jacques
May	Rose-Marie Perreault	Leda & St-Jacques
June	Zoë Kravitz	Alexander Saladrigas
July/August	Celine Dion	Tom Munro
September	Maripier Morin	D. Picard
October	Sarah-Jeanne Labrosse	Royal Gilbert
November	Magalie Lépine-Blondeau	D. Picard
December	Karine Vanasse	Carlos + Alyse

== 2020s ==
=== 2020 ===
Issue	Cover model	Photographer
January	Annie Sama; Livia Martin; Léa Roy; Sarahmée; Claudia Bouvette	Royal Gilbert
February	Katherine Levac, Karelle Tremblay	Alexis Belhumeur
March	Jane Fonda	Max Abadian
April	Marie-Mai	Carlos + Alyse
May	—N/a	
June	Charlotte Cardin	Alexis Belhumeur
Summer	Bianca Gervais	Royal Gilbert
September	Ariane Moffatt	Royal Gilbert
October	Elisapie	Leeor Wild
November	Sophie Nélisse	Alexis Belhumeur
Winter	Jay Du Temple	Shayne Laverdière

=== 2021 ===
Issue	Cover model	Photographer
February/March	Pascale Bussières	Garrett Naccarato
April	Kaytranada	
May	Karine Gonthier-Hyndman	William Arcand
June	Julie Perreault	Carlos + Ales
Summer	Rita Baga	Justin Aranha
September	Julie Le Breton	Alexis Belhumeur
October	Hubert Lenoir	Xavier Tera
November	Evelyne Brochu	Royal Gilbert
December/January 2022	Dominique Fils-Aimé	Jetro Emilcar

=== 2022 ===
Issue	Cover model	Photographer
February/March	Anne-Élisabeth Bossé	Ted Belton
April	Sarah-Maude Beauchesne	William Arcand
May	France Beaudoin	Garrett Naccarato
June	Monia Chokri	Justin Aranha
Summer	Charlotte Cardin	Leeor Wild
September	Suzanne Clément	Royal Gilbert
October	Claudia Bouvette	Garrett Naccarato
November	Charlotte Le Bon	Shayne Laverdiere
December/January 2023	Catherine Souffront, Virginie Fortin, Catherine Brunet	Alexis Belhumeur

=== 2023 ===
Issue	Cover model	Photographer
February/March	Virginie Ranger-Beauregard, Pier-Luc Funk	Alexis Belhumeur
April	Julie du Page	D. Picard
May	Christine Beaulieu, Roy Dupuis	Garrett Naccarato
Summer	Angèle	Royal Gilbert
September	Léane Labrèche-Dor	Alex Blouin, Jodi Heartz
October	Safia Nolin	Fred Gervais
November	Marie-Mai	
December/January 2024	Kim Thúy	

=== 2024 ===
Issue	Cover model	Photographer
March	Katherine Levac	
April	Sophie Grégoire Trudeau	
May	Catherine Souffront	
Summer	Karine Vanasse	
September	Janette Bertrand	
October	Sarahmée	
November	Mariana Mazza	
Winter	France Beaudoin	

=== 2025 ===
Issue	Cover model	Photographer
March	Mélissa Désormeaux-Poulin	
April	Ariane Moffatt	
May	Sophie Nélisse	
Summer	Laurence Leboeuf	
September	Sarah-Jeanne Labrosse, Marc-André Grondin	
October	Elisapie	
November	Marie-Philip Poulin	
December/January 2026	Alicia Moffet	

=== 2026 ===
Issue	Cover model	Photographer
February/March	Geneviève Schmidt	Jodi and Alex
