= Bon Cop, Bad Cop (TV series) =

Canadian television series

- Genre: Comedy; Crime; Made in Quebec
- Created by: Patrick Huard
- Based on: Bon Cop, Bad Cop
- Written by: Suzie Bouchard; Eric K. Boulianne; Benoit Chartier; Quentin Condo; Patrick Huard; Sébastien Ravary
- Directed by: Patrick Huard; Anik Jean; Miryam Bouchard; Daniel Grou
- Starring: Patrick Huard; Henry Czerny; Joshua Odjick
- Theme music composer: Anik Jean
- Country of origin: Canada
- Original languages: English; French; Mi'kmaq
- No. of series: 1
- No. of episodes: 6

Production
- Executive producers: Richard Speer; Caroline Bernier; Henry Czerny
- Producer: Patrick Huard
- Editor: Jean-François Bergeron
- Running time: 43 minutes
- Production companies: Jesse Films; PaNik Fiction; Bell Media

Original release
- Network: Crave
- Release: May 7, 2026

Bon Cop, Bad Cop is a Canadian bilingual crime comedy television series created by Patrick Huard, which premiered on Crave on May 7, 2026. A television adaptation of the film franchise that began with Bon Cop, Bad Cop (2006) and continued with Bon Cop, Bad Cop 2 (2017), the six-episode series has dialogue in English, French and the Indigenous language Mi'gmaq. Huard reprises his role as David Bouchard, now partnered with Martin Ward, played by Henry Czerny who replaces Colm Feore. The pair investigate the disappearance of an Indigenous band chief in the Gaspésie region of Quebec.

Based on the 2006 film Bon Cop, Bad Cop, the six-episode season sees David Bouchard and Martin Ward teaming up again to investigate the disappearance of a Mi'kmaq band chief (played by Nathaniel Arcand) in Gesgapegiag, Quebec. Patrick Huard returned in the role of David Bouchard. As Colm Feore was unable to return due to his ongoing role in Landman, the role of Martin Ward was taken over by Henry Czerny.

== Cast ==
The cast includes Joshua Odjick as Joe Broom, the local police chief, and Robin-Joël Cool as the prime minister of Canada, as well as Sarah-Jeanne Labrosse as Gabrielle Bouchard, David's pregnant daughter. Christine Beaulieu, Antoine Vézina, Quentin Condo, Eric K. Boulianne, Rita Baga, Mona de Grenoble and Barbada de Barbades also appear in supporting roles.

Christine Beaulieu plays a Sûreté du Québec lieutenant and Antoine Vézina the premier of Quebec.

== Production ==
Bell Media first announced an original series adapted from the Bon Cop, Bad Cop films in June 2023 and in November 2024 confirmed that it would stream on Crave in 2026 as six one-hour episodes with Huard involved as producer and writer. The writing team included Suzie Bouchard, Éric K. Boulianne, Sébastien Ravary and Benoît Chartier with Innu author Michel Jean and Mi'gmaq rapper Quentin Condo contributing because the story centres on an investigation in an Indigenous community.

Filming took place in summer 2025 in Gaspésie, Wendake, Quebec City and Montreal. The episodes were directed by Huard, Podz, Anik Jean and Miryam Bouchard. Jean who is from Gaspésie, also composed the music and co-directed and said she wanted the work to be done in a respectful way. The producers consulted Eva Thomas for an outside perspective on how other Indigenous communities might react to the show's humour and Huard again worked with Toronto writer Adam Pettle on the English-language side, as on the first film. The series is produced by Jessie Films and PaNik Fiction in collaboration with Bell Media and presented by Intact Insurance.

== Release ==
The first two episodes premiered on Crave on May 7, 2026 with the remaining episodes released weekly on Thursdays. A companion documentary about the making of the series, Bon Cop Bad Cop : Histoire de familles was scheduled for release on Crave on June 4, 2026.

== Reception ==
Hugo Dumas of La Presse gave the first two episodes a mixed verdict, "despite explosions, car chases, stunts and the crew's evident hard work he found little to laugh at, and noted that Feore's departure and the shift from a bickering duo to a quartet of dysfunctional officers would unsettle fans of the films".
