= Patrick Roy (producer) =

Patrick Roy is a Canadian film producer and distributor. Formerly the president of Les Films Séville, he launched the new distribution company Immina Films in 2022 after Séville was shut down by owner Entertainment One.

== Awards ==
Award	Year	Category	Work	Result	Ref(s)
Prix Iris	2023	Prix Michel-Côté	My Mother's Men (Les hommes de ma mère) (with Patrick Huard, Anik Jean, Maryse Latendresse)	Won	
Prix Iris	2023	Prix Michel-Côté	One Summer (Le temps d'un été) (with Antonello Cozzolino, Brigitte Léveillé, Louise Archambault, Marie Vien)	Nominated	
Prix Iris	2023	Prix Michel-Côté	Two Days Before Christmas (23 décembre) (with Guillaume Lespérance, Miryam Bouchard, India Desjardins)	Nominated	
Prix Iris	2024	Prix Michel-Côté	1995 (with Marie-Claude Poulin, Ricardo Trogi)	Nominated	
Prix Iris	2024	Prix Michel-Côté	The Nature of Love (Simple comme Sylvain) (with Monia Chokri, Sylvain Corbeil, Nancy Grant, Elisha Karmitz, Nathanaël Karmitz)	Nominated	
Prix Iris	2024	Prix Michel-Côté	Ru (with Marie-Alexandra Forget, André Dupuy, Charles-Olivier Michaud, Jacques Davidts)	Nominated	
