= SNL Québec =

Canadian television sketch comedy series

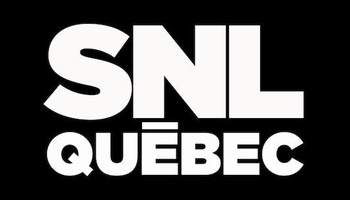
- Genre: Sketch comedy
- Based on: Saturday Night Live by Lorne Michaels
- Starring: Katherine Levac; Virginie Fortin; Léane Labrèche-Dor; Pier-Luc Funk; Mathieu Quesnel; Guillaume Girard; Mickaël Gouin; Phil Roy
- Country of origin: Canada
- Original language: French
- No. of seasons: 1
- No. of episodes: 10

Production
- Production locations: Montreal, Quebec

Original release
- Network: Télé-Québec (2014-15); Ici Radio-Canada Télé (2018)
- Release: February 8, 2014 – January 6, 2018

SNL Québec is a Canadian television sketch comedy series that aired on Télé-Québec from February 8, 2014, to March 21, 2015. The series returned with one final revival that aired on January 6, 2018.

A French-language adaptation of the American sketch comedy series Saturday Night Live, the series featured both translated recreations of sketches from the original series and original material written for the Quebec series. The show's first episode included a translation of the iconic Schweddy Balls sketch, and a sketch in the second episode recast the leaders' debate from the 2014 provincial election as an episode of Un dîner presque parfait, the French-language version of Come Dine with Me.

== Cast ==
The show's core cast members were Katherine Levac, Virginie Fortin, Léane Labrèche-Dor, Pier-Luc Funk, Mathieu Quesnel, Guillaume Girard, Mickaël Gouin and Phil Roy. Quesnel served as Les nouvelles SNL anchor for the first two episodes, with Girard and Gouin taking over thereafter.

== Production ==
Initially announced as two standalone comedy specials, several further episodes were produced in 2014 and 2015 as a once-a-month series. Ten episodes, nine originals and a "best-of" compilation of sketches from the earlier episodes, were broadcast overall. As advance publicity for the first two specials, hosts Louis-José Houde and Stéphane Rousseau each recorded segments in which they visited the New York City set of the original Saturday Night Live, including brief interviews with some of SNL's cast.

== Episodes ==
| No. | Hosted by | Musical guest(s) | Original release date |
|---|---|---|---|
| 1 | Louis-José Houde | Radio Radio | February 8, 2014 |
| 2 | Stéphane Rousseau | Les Trois Accords | March 22, 2014 |
| 3 | Normand Brathwaite | Lisa LeBlanc | September 20, 2014 |
| 4 | Antoine Bertrand | Random Recipe | October 18, 2014 |
| 5 | Patrick Huard | Damien Robitaille | November 22, 2014 |
| 6 | Guy A. Lepage | DJ Champion | December 13, 2014 |
| 7 | Véronic Dicaire | Véronic Dicaire | January 31, 2015 |
| 8 | Charles Lafortune | Alex Nevsky | February 21, 2015 |
| 9 | Guylaine Tremblay | Dumas | March 21, 2015 |
| 10 | Magalie Lépine-Blondeau | Daniel Bélanger | January 6, 2018 |

== Cancellation ==
Télé-Québec announced in early 2015 that due to cutbacks to its budget, the series would not be renewed for another season.

Ici Radio-Canada Télé subsequently announced that it had signed the show's production team and cast to produce a new series, Le nouveau show, for that network.

The show was revived for a one-time special hosted by Magalie Lépine-Blondeau, aired on January 6, 2018.
