= Bon Cop, Bad Cop =

- Directed by: Érik Canuel
- Written by: Leila Basen; Alex Epstein; Patrick Huard; Kevin Tierney
- Produced by: Kevin Tierney
- Starring: Patrick Huard; Colm Feore; Michel Beaudry; Patrice Bélanger; Sarain Boylan; Hugolin Chevrette; Rick Howland; Erik Knudsen; Sarah-Jeanne Labrosse; Lucie Laurier; Sylvain Marcel; André Robitaille; Rick Mercer
- Production company: Alliance Atlantis Vivafilm
- Distributed by: Motion Picture Distribution LP
- Release date: August 4, 2006
- Running time: 116 minutes
- Country: Canada
- Languages: English; French
- Budget: CAD$8 million
- Box office: $12.6 million

Bon Cop, Bad Cop is a 2006 Canadian black comedy-thriller buddy cop film about two police officers – one Ontarian and one Québécois – who reluctantly join forces to solve a murder. The dialogue is a mixture of English and French. The title is a translation word play on the phrase "good cop, bad cop".

== Plot ==
When a body is found hanging on top of the sign demarcating the Ontario–Quebec border, police officers from both Canadian provinces must join forces to solve the murder. David Bouchard is a rule-bending, francophone detective for the Sûreté du Québec, while Martin Ward is a by-the-book anglophone Ontario Provincial Police detective. The bilingual detectives must resolve their professional and cultural differences as well as their bigotry and prejudices.

The body is identified as Benoit Brisset, a hockey executive. The clues lead the pair to Luc Therrien at a roadside bar. After a fight in the bar, they imprison him in the trunk of Bouchard's car. Bouchard has promised to watch his daughter Gabrielle's ballet recital, so he drives to the recital and parks the car in front with Therrien still locked in the trunk. When they emerge, they find the car being towed from the no-parking zone, and as they try to chase down the truck driver, the car explodes.

With their prime witness dead, they decide to search Therrien's house where they find a large marijuana grow-op in the basement. They also discover another body: the former hockey team owner Grossbut. A laser tripwire is activated by Bouchard and a bomb explodes, which sets the house on fire, destroying the house and causing the two cops to get high on the fumes of the burning marijuana. When they are disciplined by Bouchard's police chief Roger Leboeuf shortly afterwards, he angrily removes them from the case after they start laughing hysterically because they're still high.

The next victim is discovered in Toronto, the League's first woman agent Martina Flabcheeks. They realize that the killer has a pattern of tattooing his victims, with each tattoo providing a clue to the next murder victim. Each murder is in some way connected to major league hockey. (The film uses thinly disguised parodies of National Hockey League teams, owners and players, however, rather than the real league). The pair anticipate the next victim to be Pickleton, but he goes missing before they reach him. Ward and Bouchard appear on a hockey broadcast to warn people in the hockey community to be vigilant. The "Tattoo Killer" calls in to the show and threatens the two police officers, causing a brawl between them and the neurotic anchor Tom Berry when they attempt to hang up.

Ward is attacked in his home by a masked assailant whom he discovers is Therrien, who is actually still alive. In reality, a barmaid named Rita Beaumount, who the duo encountered with Therrien earlier, was somehow put in the trunk of the car and died in the explosion. Meanwhile, Bouchard has sex with Ward's sister Iris.

The "Tattoo Killer" kidnaps Gabrielle in exchange for the League commissioner Harry Buttman, leading to the final confrontation with the two policemen kidnapping Buttman themselves. It is ultimately revealed that the murders are being committed by Therrien, under the direction and unequal partnership of a sadistic, psychopathic, and sociopathic hockey fan that subscribes to the notion that hockey is a Canadian nationalistic symbol that is being permanently corrupted by attempts to move ownership of Canadian teams to venture capitalist groups in the United States. He is therefore having Therrien commit the murders with him (with the tattoos as a signature), as revenge against the hockey league for desecrating the game by moving Canadian teams such as the "Québec Fleur de Lys" (a reference to the now-defunct Quebec Nordiques) to the United States. They try to reason with him that hockey is just a game and exchange Therrien, whom the detectives intercepted tailing them at a conference, for Gabrielle, but this only angers him. The Tattoo Killer executes Therrien and as the two policemen give him Buttman, Ward distracts the man while Bouchard unties Gabrielle. After a fight, the killer is blown up by one of his own explosives that Ward had placed in his pocket. During the credits, a press conference is shown, with Buttman declaring a new rule that no more Canadian hockey teams will be moved.

== Cast ==
- Patrick Huard – David Bouchard
- Colm Feore – Martin Ward
- Lucie Laurier – Suzie
- Sylvain Marcel – Luc Therrien
- Pierre Lebeau – Capt. Roger Leboeuf
- Ron Lea – Capt. Brian MacDuff
- Sarain Boylan – Iris
- Sarah-Jeanne Labrosse – Gabrielle
- Louis-José Houde – Jeff
- Patrice Bélanger – Tattoo Killer
- Rick Mercer – Tom Berry (a parody of hockey personality Don Cherry)
- Erik Knudsen – Jonathan
- Rick Howland – Harry Buttman (a parody of National Hockey League commissioner Gary Bettman)
- André Robitaille – Benoit Brisset
- Hugolin Chevrette – Stef
- Gilles Renaud – Grossbut (a parody of former Quebec Nordiques owner Marcel Aubut)
- Michel Beaudry – a journalist

== Production ==
The movie was primarily filmed in Montreal, Ottawa, and, Vancouver. It is the 4th feature film by Quebecois director Érik Canuel.

=== Bilingualism ===
Bon Cop, Bad Cop claimed to be Canada's first bilingual feature film, although that accomplishment in fact belongs to Amanita Pestilens (1963). Since the film revolves around the concept of mixed cultures and languages, most scenes include a mixture of French and English dialogue, with characters switching language rapidly. The entire movie was filmed using both a French and an English script, and the language used at each moment was finalized only later, during editing. The film was then released in two official versions, one for Anglophones and one for Francophones, which differ only in their subtitles and in a few spoken lines. On DVD, the film has multiple subtitle options, including every line in either English, in French, or in their respective languages; just the French lines in English (as released theatrically in English-speaking Canada) and vice versa (as released theatrically in French-speaking Canada); and an option for no subtitles for bilingual viewers.

== Reception ==
=== Box office ===
==== Canada ====
The film opened in Quebec on August 4, 2006 (and Canada-wide on August 18), and, as of December 17, 2006, had grossed $12,665,721 US ($12,578,327 CAD), making it one of the highest-grossing Canadian films of all time domestically. While the film has generated only $1.3 million outside of Quebec, its success is significant given the difficulties that Canadian films normally face at the box office in English Canada.

In October 2006, Bon Cop, Bad Cop's producers claimed that the film had become the highest-grossing Canadian film domestically, surpassing the $11.2 million teen comedy Porky's earned in Canada in 1981. However, the numbers were later disputed as not having taken inflation into account.

==== International ====
The film has not been released theatrically outside Canada, although it has been screened at film festivals and other occasions in the United States and France.

=== Critical response ===
On the review aggregator website Rotten Tomatoes, 80% of 10 critics' reviews are positive, with an average rating of 6.2/10.

=== Accolades ===
Award	Date of ceremony	Category	Recipients(s)	Result	Ref.
Canadian Comedy Awards	12 October 2007	Best Male Performance	Patrick Huard	Won	
Canadian Comedy Awards	12 October 2007	Best Male Performance	Colm Feore	Nominated	
Canadian Comedy Awards	12 October 2007	Best Direction	Érik Canuel	Won	
Canadian Comedy Awards	12 October 2007	Best Writing	Patrick Huard, Leila Basen, Kevin Tierney, Alex Epstein	Won	
Directors Guild of Canada	29 September 2007	Best Direction in a Feature Film	Érik Canuel	Nominated	
Genie Awards	13 February 2007	Best Motion Picture	Kevin Tierney	Won	
Genie Awards	13 February 2007	Best Director	Érik Canuel	Nominated	
Genie Awards	13 February 2007	Best Actor	Colm Feore	Nominated	
Genie Awards	13 February 2007	Best Actor	Patrick Huard	Nominated	
Genie Awards	13 February 2007	Best Art Direction/Production Design	Jean Bécotte	Nominated	
Genie Awards	13 February 2007	Best Cinematography	Bruce Chun	Nominated	
Genie Awards	13 February 2007	Best Editing	Jean-François Bergeron	Nominated	
Genie Awards	13 February 2007	Best Overall Sound	Dominique Chartrand, Gavin Fernandes, Nathalie Morin and Pierre Paquet	Won	
Genie Awards	13 February 2007	Best Sound Editing	Christian Rivest, Valéry Dufort-Boucher, and Tchae Measroch	Nominated	
Genie Awards	13 February 2007	Best Original Song	Éric Lapointe, Stéphane Dufour and Jamil for "Tattoo"	Nominated	
Jutra Awards	18 February 2007	Best Film	Kevin Tierney	Nominated	
Jutra Awards	18 February 2007	Best Director	Érik Canuel	Nominated	
Jutra Awards	18 February 2007	Best Actor	Colm Feore	Nominated	
Jutra Awards	18 February 2007	Best Actor	Patrick Huard	Nominated	
Jutra Awards	18 February 2007	Best Supporting Actor	Pierre Lebeau	Nominated	
Jutra Awards	18 February 2007	Best Supporting Actress	Lucie Laurier	Nominated	
Jutra Awards	18 February 2007	Best Screenplay	Leila Basen, Alex Epstein, Patrick Huard, and Kevin Tierney	Nominated	
Jutra Awards	18 February 2007	Best Art Direction	Jean Bécotte	Nominated	
Jutra Awards	18 February 2007	Best Editing	Jean-François Bergeron	Won	
Jutra Awards	18 February 2007	Best Hair	Johanne Paiement	Nominated	
Jutra Awards	18 February 2007	Best Makeup	Claudette Beaudoin-Casavant	Nominated	
Jutra Awards	18 February 2007	Best Original Music	Michel Corriveau	Nominated	
Jutra Awards	18 February 2007	Best Sound	Dominique Chartrand, Christian Rivest, Gavin Fernandes and Pierre Paquet	Nominated	
Jutra Awards	18 February 2007	Billet d'or		Won	

== Home media ==
The film was released on DVD in Canada on December 19, 2006.

== Sequel and adaptation ==
A sequel film, Bon Cop, Bad Cop 2, was filmed in 2016 and released in May 2017.

In 2023, Bell Media announced that an eight-episode television series was in development, featuring David Bouchard and Martin Ward in a new crime investigation. Bon Cop, Bad Cop entered production in 2025, with Huard reprising the role of David Bouchard but Henry Czerny taking over the role of Martin Ward as Feore could not return due to other acting commitments. The series premiered on Crave in May 2026.

== See also ==
- List of films about ice hockey
