= My Mother's Men =

2023 Canadian drama film

- French: Les Hommes de ma mère
- Directed by: Anik Jean
- Written by: Maryse Latendresse
- Produced by: Patrick Huard; Anik Jean
- Starring: Léane Labrèche-Dor; Marc Messier; Patrick Huard; Benoît Gouin; Colm Feore
- Cinematography: Steve Asselin
- Edited by: Jean-François Bergeron
- Music by: Anik Jean
- Production company: Jessie Films
- Distributed by: Immina Films
- Release date: August 4, 2023
- Running time: 126 minutes
- Country: Canada
- Language: French

My Mother's Men (French: Les Hommes de ma mère) is a Canadian drama film, directed by Anik Jean and released in 2023. The film stars Léane Labrèche-Dor as Elsie, a woman who is fulfilling her recently deceased mother Anne's (Anne-Marie Cadieux) wishes that a portion of her ashes be given to each of her ex-husbands.

The cast also includes Marc Messier, Patrick Huard, Benoît Gouin, Colm Feore, Jean-Simon Leduc, Isabel Richer, Sandrine Bisson, Louis-Georges Girard, Mireille Métellus, Emma Lafrenière and Frank Marrs.

Jean, previously known as a musician, directed the film as her solo feature debut, and stated that she had connected with the script due to the recent death of her own father.

== Distribution ==
The film premiered commercially on August 4, 2023; by August 21 it had made over $1 million at the provincial box office in Quebec. It also screened in the Industry Selects program at the 2023 Toronto International Film Festival, and received a gala screening at the 2023 Cinéfest Sudbury International Film Festival.

== Awards ==
Award	Date of ceremony	Category	Recipient(s)	Result	Ref(s)
Prix Iris	December 10, 2023	Best Actress	Léane Labrèche-Dor	Nominated	
Prix Iris	December 10, 2023	Best First Film	Anik Jean	Nominated	
Prix Iris	December 10, 2023	Public Prize	Patrick Roy, Patrick Huard, Anik Jean, Maryse Latendresse	Won	
