= Mammouth =

2004 Canadian film directed by Stefan Miljevic

- Directed by: Stefan Miljevic
- Written by: Stéphane Hogue; Stefan Miljevic
- Produced by: Julie Le Breton; Stefan Miljevic
- Starring: Julie Le Breton; Robin Aubert; Louis Champagne
- Cinematography: Stephan Menghi
- Edited by: Stefan Miljevic; Serge Sirois
- Release date: 2000
- Running time: 30 minutes
- Country: Canada
- Language: French

Mammouth is a Canadian short drama film, directed by Stefan Miljevic and released in 2004. The film stars Julie Le Breton as Manon, a woman who is returning to her hometown to track down an unspecified person she has lost contact with; when her car breaks down, she is aided by Conrad (Robin Aubert), another driver, and Mario (Louis Champagne), a mechanic, who are not acting with altruistic motives.

The film won the Jutra Award for Best Live Action Short Film at the 6th Jutra Awards.
