= Louis Champagne (actor) =

Canadian actor

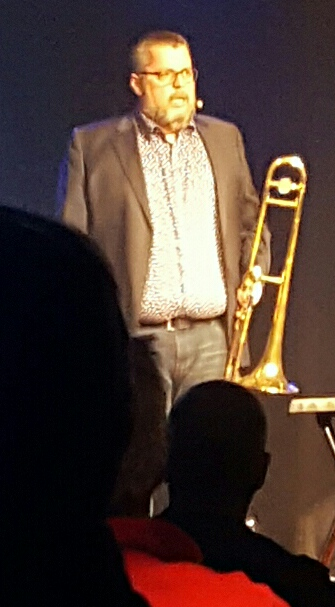
- Born: Toronto, Ontario, Canada
- Occupations: actor, film director
- Years active: 1990s-present

Louis Champagne is a Canadian actor from Quebec, most noted for his regular television roles in Minuit, le soir and Escouade 99.

He has also had stage roles, including as Edna Turnblad in a 2013 production of Hairspray for Montreal's Théâtre Saint-Denis, and has appeared in supporting roles in film and television. In 2007 he directed the independent film Les Cavaliers de la canette.

He is married to television writer Dominick Parenteau-Lebeuf.

== Filmography ==
=== Film ===
Year	Title	Role	Notes
1996	L'Oreille de Joé		Short film
1997	Heads or Tails (J'en suis!)	Minister of Culture	
1997	Les Boys	Rodrigue	
1998	It's Your Turn, Laura Cadieux (C't'à ton tour, Laura Cadieux)	Bus driver	
2000	Riders	Sergeant-at-arms of the Devil's Soldiers	
2000	The Bottle (La Bouteille)		
2001	Karmina 2	Norm	
2003	Quelques instants de la vie d'une fraise	Ben	
2003	Les Immortels	Jean-Guy	
2004	Happy Camper (Camping sauvage)	Brake	
2004	TV Dinner...Burp!		Short film
2004	Mammouth	Mario	Short film
2005	La dernière incarnation	Bouncer	
2007	Les cavaliers de la canette	Louis	Also writer, director
2007	Mon cœur		Short film
2009	Un homme de main	Jean-Louis	Short film
2011	Monsieur Lazhar	Concierge	
2011	Thrill of the Hills (Frisson des collines)		
2011	Coteau rouge	Sgt. Bonneville	
2013	Rock Paper Scissors (Roche papier ciseaux)	Bobby	
2013	Amsterdam	Marc	
2015	Blue Thunder (Bleu tonnerre)	Foreman	Short film
2015	Ville-Marie	Benoit Tremblay	
2019	Forgotten Flowers (Les fleurs oubliées)	Ulysse Caron	
2023	The Successor	Pierre-Luc	

=== Television ===
Year	Title	Role	Notes
1995	Alys Robi	Paul Desmarteaux	Miniseries
1995	Turtle Island	Splash	Voice role
1996	Les cinq dernières minutes	Security chief	One episode
1998–2002	Un gars, une fille	Multiple roles	Five episodes
1999	km/h	Andrée's brother	One episode
2000	Dans une galaxie près de chez vous	Elvis	One episode
2001	Fortier	Molosse #2	One episode
2001	2 frères	Raymond	Four episodes
2001	The Last Chapter		Six episodes
2003	Chartrand et Simonne	Credit union manager	One episode
2004	Les Bougon		One episode
2004	Temps dur	Jack Perron	Three episodes
2005	Au nom de la loi	Scorpion	
2005	Caméra Café		One episode
2005–07	Minuit, le soir	Louis Bergeron	
2008	Les Lavigueur, la vraie histoire	Jean-Marie Daudelin	Six episodes
2008	Bob Gratton: Ma Vie/My Life	Moving supervisor	One episode
2009	Les Hauts et les bas de Sophie Paquin	Réal Potvin	Two episodes
2010	11 Règles	André	
2011	Mauvais karma	Lt.-Det. Amyot	Four episodes
2013	30 vies	Stéphane Boudrias	Nine episodes
2014	Toute la vérité	Michel Dubois	One episode
2015–16	Camping de l'ours	Bert Bertrand	
2016	Les Beaux malaises	Colosse	One episode
2016	Ça décolle!	Police officer	One episode
2017	Faits divers	Rodrigue Rancourt	Three episodes
2017	L'Imposteur	Right-hand man of Gandhi	Seven episodes
2017	Au secours de Béatrice		One episode
2019	Appelle-moi si tu meurs	Fabio Vietti	Eight episodes
2020–present	Escouade 99	Goudreau	
2021	Nous	François Vadeboncoeur	
2023	Virage: Double faute		Two episodes
2023	La Candidate	Jean-Robert Mailloux	Five episodes
2024	Projet Innocence		
