= Claudia Bouvette =

Canadian singer, songwriter and actress

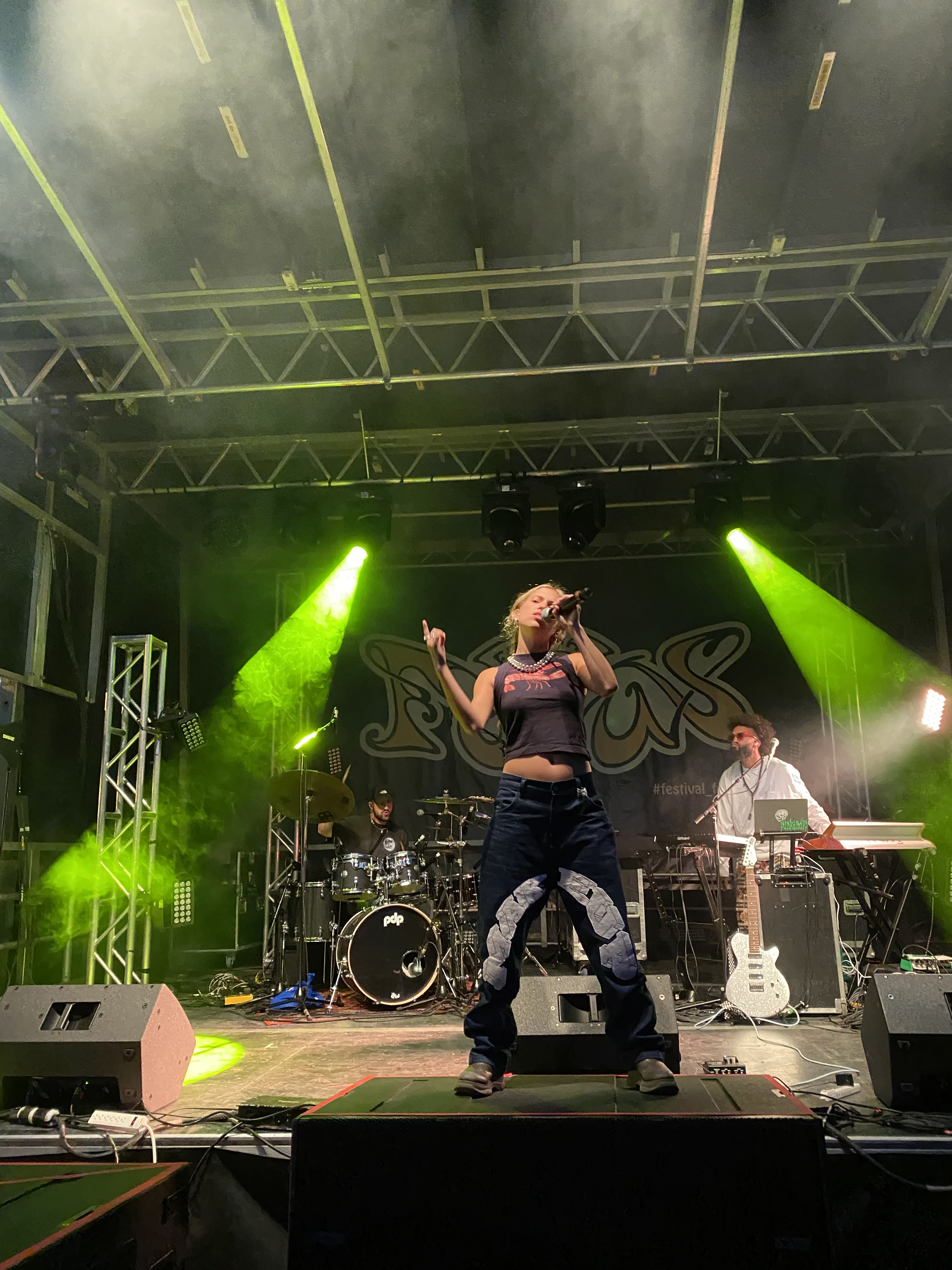
- Claudia Bouvette performing at Focus Festival in September 2023

Background information
- Born: July 5, 1995 (age 31); Bromont, Québec, Canada
- Genres: Alternative pop, dream pop
- Occupations: Singer, songwriter, actress
- Instruments: Vocals, piano, guitar
- Years active: 2011–present
- Website: https://claudiabouvette.com/

Claudia Bouvette (born July 5, 1995) is a singer, songwriter and actress born in Bromont, Quebec, and based in Montreal. Bouvette released her first EP Cool It in 2019, followed by her first studio album The Paradise Club in 2022. In October 2024, she released her second album Diary For The Lonely Hearts.

== Life and career ==
=== 1995–2010: Early life ===
Claudia Bouvette was born on July 5, 1995, in Bromont. She cultivated a musical and theatrical background from a young age. As a child, she learned violin and flute. At thirteen, Bouvette starred as the main character in the musical Annie. In secondary school, Bouvette was a part of her school's wind orchestra. In 9th grade, she was hired to sing at Mont Sutton, accompanied by her brother at the guitar.

=== 2011–2013: Mixmania 2 ===
In 2011, Claudia Bouvette made her television debut at 15 by participating in VRAK.TV reality show Mixmania 2,^{[fr]} a competition of song and dance featuring 12 teenagers. Bouvette was named leader of the girl group The Glamies, who ultimately won the competition. Bouvette was also elected by the public to sing in a duet with Jérémy Plante in Tant que l'on s'aime. Between April 2011 and January 2012, the group Mixmania 2 toured around Quebec, performing songs from their album.

Although coming home from Mixmania 2 was a difficult experience for Bouvette, affecting the rest of her high school experience, she has stated that her participation in the competition was a pivotal moment in the development of her artistic career.

In the years following Mixmania 2, Claudia Bouvette appeared in various advertisements on television. She also started songwriting around the age of 16.

=== 2014–2018: TV career ===
Claudia Bouvette has stated in multiple interviews that her acting career was unintentional and that acting "found her". Making her television debut as a student in 30 vies, Bouvette spent 5 years multiplying roles in youth and drama TV. Notably, Bouvette played the recurring role of Raph in VRAK.TV's Jérémie ^{[fr]} from 2015 to 2019.

In 2017, Bouvette was introduced to the label Cult Nation and producer Connor Seidel. In a challenge to write 30 demos, Bouvette and Seidel spent a year and a half writing together, travelling as far as the Los Angeles SOCAN house.

=== 2019–2021: Cool It ===
In June 2019, Bouvette's first EP Cool It was released; its 8 tracks were a result of the 30 demos made in collaboration with Seidel. In November 2019, Bouvette was featured on Alex Nevsky's single "Chemin Sauvage", bringing her to perform as the opening act during his winter 2020 tour.

In October 2021, Bouvette joined the label Bonsound and released her first Bonsound single "BBZ".

=== 2022–2023: The Paradise Club ===
In early 2022, Claudia Bouvette participated in season 2 of Big Brother Célébrités, hosted by Marie-Mai. After spending 11 weeks on the show, Bouvette was named Public's Favourite.

In May 2022, Bouvette released her first album The Paradise Club, after three years of work with producer Connor Seidel. In the following summer, Bouvette performed at multiple festivals across Québec, including FEQ and Santa Teresa. Throughout 2022, in addition to The Paradise Club tour, Claudia Bouvette performed as the opening act for artists like Mika and Tyler Shaw.

In October 2022, Bouvette was featured on the cover of Elle Québec. In early 2023, Bouvette appeared on ICI Télé's Zénith as the captain of the Gen Z team. Throughout 2023, Bouvette has released singles "Highly Unrecommended", "First Date" with Sophia Bel and "Cowgirl Radio".

=== 2024-Present: Diary For The Lonely Hearts ===
In October 2024, Bouvette was featured in a billboard takeover of Toronto's Yonge-Dundas Square (now Sankofa Square), and announced as Spotify’s RADAR Canada Artist. Soon after, she released her second studio album Diary For The Lonely Hearts, a collaborative project with singer-songwriter Soran.

In August 2026, Claudia signed a new contract with the record label Bonsound to shift her music toward an entirely French pop-country style.

During the same month, she posted comments on TikTok from listeners encouraging her to sing in French due to her Quebec origins. The artist responded to these remarks by reminding her audience that she already sang in French during her time on the show Mixmania 2 and has always continued to write in her native language.

== Musical style and artistry ==
Claudia Bouvette's music touches on a mix of genres, including pop, electro and hip-hop. Although Bouvette's inspirations include Bon Iver, James Blake and Niki & The Dove, she has been compared to artists such as Billie Eilish and Caroline Polacheck. Bouvette sings and writes in French and English.

Cool It EP and The Paradise Club have both been produced and co-directed by Connor Seidel, who has also worked with Charlotte Cardin, Les Soeurs Boulay, and Matt Holubowski. Bouvette and Seidel arranged and played all the instruments on both projects, with the help of drummer Max Bellavance. In an interview with La Presse, Bouvette revealed that her music work entails imagining a universe, from music and sound to storytelling and visuals.

Claudia Bouvette's first album The Paradise Club draws heavily on inspirations from the 2000s, namely Akon, Fergie and Gwen Stefani. In the genre of alternative dream pop, the album explores themes of empowerment, femininity and nostalgia. Wonderland magazine called her single Douchebag a "total display of female emancipation". Collaborators on the album include Les Louanges (1000 bornes, Touchée-Coulée, Miss Blumenfeld) and Kodakludo (I Don't Wanna Say Goodbye).

Her second album, Diary For The Lonely Hearts, leans into a more pop-oriented sound, inspired from Lana Del Rey and Cyndi Lauper.

== Discography ==
=== Studio albums ===
List of studio albums, with details
Title	Details
The Paradise Club	Release date: May 20, 2022; Label: Bonsound; Formats: Digital, CD, Vinyl
Diary For The Lonely Hearts	Release date: October 25, 2024; Label: Bonsound; Formats: Digital, CD, Vinyl

=== Extended plays ===
List of extended plays, with details
Title	Details
Cool It	Release date: June 12, 2019; Label: Cult Nation; Formats: Digital, CD

=== Singles ===
==== As lead artist ====
List of singles as a lead artist, showing year released and album name
Title	Year	Album
"Cool It"	2019	Cool It EP
"You're Coming Back to Me"	2019	Non-album single
"Back to Life" _{(Version française)}	2020	Non-album single
"Baby Boy"	2020	Non-album single
"BBZ"	2021	The Paradise Club
"Miss Blumenfeld"	2021	The Paradise Club
"Douchebag"	2022	The Paradise Club
"G-GIRL"	2022	The Paradise Club
"Solo Night"	2022	The Paradise Club
"Solo Night" _{(Version française)}	2022	Non-album single
"BBZ" (Remix Featuring BLEM)	2022	Non-album single
"Highly Unrecommended"	2023	Non-album single
"First Date" _{(with Sophia Bel)}	2023	Non-album single
"First Date" _{(Version française)} _{(with Sophia Bel)}	2023	Non-album single
"Cowgirl Radio"	2023	Non-album single
"Call Me Back!"	2024	Diary For The Lonely Hearts
"W.O.W.Y."	2024	Diary For The Lonely Hearts
"Don't Wanna Hear That Song Anymore"	2024	Diary For The Lonely Hearts
"Silver Lining"	2024	Diary For The Lonely Hearts
"Amour écran"	2026	
"Désalignées"	2026	

==== As featured artist ====
List of singles as a featured artist, showing year released and album name
Title	Year	Album
"Chemin sauvage" _{(Alex Nevsky featuring Claudia Bouvette)}	2019	Chemin sauvage
"Jeanne-Mance" _{(Kirouac and Kodakludo featuring Claudia Bouvette)}	2019	Summer Pack! EP
"Unavailable" _{(Qualité Motel [fr] featuring Claudia Bouvette)}	2020	C'est la quantité qui compte
"kodak jetable" _{(Luis Clavis featuring Claudia Bouvette)}	2020	Non-album single
"Hot Slush Puppie" _{(Hologramme featuring Claudia Bouvette,} _{Mantisse, AG Kone)}	2021	CIEL
"Post Mortem" _{(1969 Collective featuring Claudia Bouvette)}	2022	1969
"Problème Zéro" _{(Mada Mada featuring Claudia Bouvette and Miro)}	2023	Non-album single
"Rêver Éveillé" _{(Claude Bégin [fr] featuring Claudia Bouvette)}	2023	Non-album single
"Rien" _{(Moses Belanger and Mantisse featuring Claudia Bouvette)}	2023	Fullum
"SNAKES" _{(Charles Lavoie featuring Claudia Bouvette)}	2023	Solo (Original Motion Picture Soundtrack)

=== Guest appearances ===
List of non-single guest appearances, with other performing artists, showing year released and album name
Title	Year	Other artist(s)	Album
"Birdsong"	2019	Beau Diako	Flutter
"J'te garde avec moi"	2022	Ariane Moffatt	Aquanaute 2022
"Là où Tu iras – La légende du papillon"	2023	Various artists	La Légende du Papillon (Trame Sonore)

=== Music videos ===
Title	Year	Director
"Cool It"	2019	Sébastien Duguay
"Y'é quelle heure?"	2019	Caraz
"BBZ"	2021	Léa Taillefer
"Douchebag"	2022	Soleil Denault
"Solo Night"	2022	Lou-Pascal Tremblay ^{[fr]}
"Highly Unrecommended"	2023	Vincent Gravel
"First Date" _{(with Sophia Bel)}	2023	Claudia Bouvette, Sophia Bel
"Call Me Back"	2024	Claudia Bouvette, Samuel Olaechea
"W.O.W.Y."	2024	Claudia Bouvette
"Lonely Hearts"	2024	Claudia Bouvette, Samuel Olaechea
"Bite The Apple"	2024	Claudia Bouvette, Samuel Olaechea

=== Visualizers ===
Title	Year	Director
"Amour écran"	2026	Claudia Bouvette, Charles Vary
"Désalignées"	2026	Henri Taillon

== Filmography ==
=== Television ===
Year	Title	Role	Notes	Ref(s)
2014	30 vies	Sarah-Maude Petit	Season 5	
2015	Subito Texto ^{[fr]}	Sierra Marceau-Desgagnés	Seasons 3–5	
2015-2019	Jérémie ^{[fr]}	Raphaëlle Parker	Seasons 1–5	
2017	District 31 ^{[fr]}	Laura Saindon	Season 2, Episode 56	
2018	Cérébrum	Alice Perrin	Season 1	
2021	Toute la vie	Martine Roy	Season 3, Episode 8	
2022	Big Brother Célébrités	Herself	Season 2	
2022	La maison des folles ^{[fr]}	Vanessa	Season 2 Nominated for Best Supporting Role in a Program or Series Produced for Digital Media: Drama at the 2022 Gémeaux Awards	
2023	Zénith	Herself, Gen Z team captain	Season 1	
2024	Projet Innocence	Vickie Tremblay	Season 1	
2025	STAT	Andréanne	Season 3	

=== Cinema ===
Year	Title	Director	Role	Notes	Ref(s)
2018	Charlotte a du fun	Sophie Lorain	Noémie		
2023	Respire	Onur Karaman	Josée		
