= Daniel Grou =

Canadian film and television director

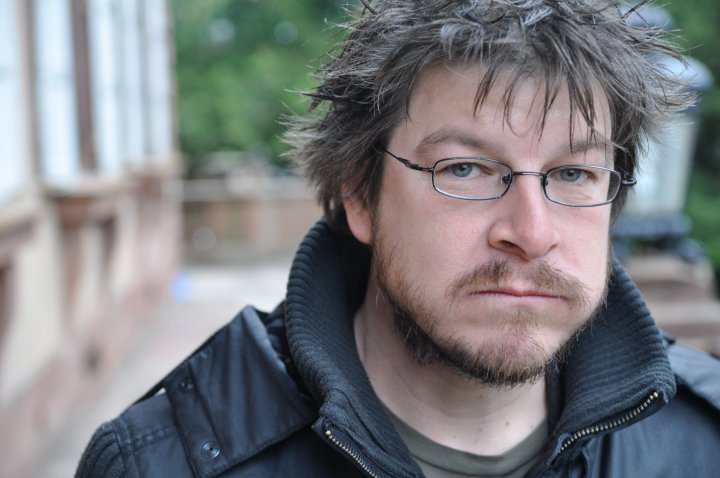
- Born: 19 August 1967 (age 59); Montreal, Canada
- Occupations: Film director; film producer; screenwriter
- Years active: 2003–present

Daniel Grou (born August 19, 1967), frequently credited as Podz, is a Canadian film and television director, director of six feature films as well as episodes in dozen TV series.

== Biography ==
Daniel Grou was born in Montreal, Canada. He has a bachelor's degree in film studies.

He took the nickname "Podz" from the fact that his surname differs in spelling, but not in pronunciation, from the far more common French Canadian surname Groulx, meaning that he was frequently forced to state his surname to people as "Grou, pas d'lx".

== Career ==
Grou started his career directing rock videos and English-language TV shows, Drop the Beat was one of his first projects. He made more than 60 videoclips for various artists, including Laymen Twaist and René Dupéré.

His credits include six feature films as well as episodes in dozen TV series.

He directed all three seasons of Canadian French-language 19-2, and later was invited to direct the first episode of season two of the English version.

Grou directed the first and the third seasons of Cardinal, missing the second one due to a scheduling conflict. The series were adapted from Giles Blunt’s book Forty Words for Sorrow.

Grou feature film 7 days, a story about a father's revenge, was screened at Sundance festival and well-received by its audience that appreciated ‘reimagining of the horrors of torture porn’ and praised Grou for bringing moral complexity to the genre and balancing the violence with impeccable direction. However, some critics were sceptical and called the movie a ‘pseudo-artistic veneer’ that lacked catharsis and showed forgettable characters.

Released in 2013, Vikings became one of Grou's most popular projects. The showrunner Michael Hirst called Grou ‘a very gifted director’ and confessed that he was the only one to tackle the most challenging episodes. For Vikings he was nominated for DGC's award for outstanding directorial achievement in a dramatic series.

In 2021, he released Mafia Inc., a drama about the Canadian mafia based on a nonfiction book written by a former mob.

Grou's film received high acclaim and he was complimented for a bold move into a genre completely dominated by Coppola's The Godfather. The film was premiered at São Paulo International Film Festival before having its Canadian premiere in February 2020.

In April 2023, Grou's upcoming project Kill Me Now was selected by Telefilm Canada for its Production Program.

== Awards ==
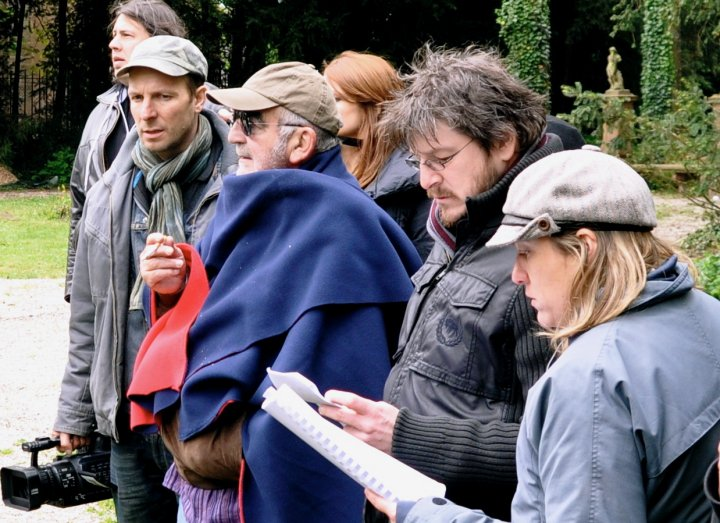
Jean-Louis Foulquier and Podz in 2010

Grou is a four-time Gémeaux Award winner for Best Direction in a Dramatic Television Series or Program, winning in 2003 for the television film Exils, in 2006 and 2007 for Minuit, le soir, and in 2011 for the French version of 19-2. He was a Jutra Award nominee for Best Director in 2011 for 10½ and in 2013 for L'Affaire Dumont, a Genie Award nominee for Best Director at the 31st Genie Awards in 2010 for 10½, and a Canadian Screen Award nominee for Best Direction in a Dramatic Television Series at the 4th Canadian Screen Awards in 2016 for the 19-2 episode "School".

== Filmography ==
=== Cinema ===
- 2010 : 7 Days (Les 7 jours du Talion)
- 2010 : 10½
- 2012 : L'Affaire Dumont
- 2014 : Miraculum
- 2015 : King Dave
- 2020 : Mafia Inc.

=== TV ===
- 1999 : The Hunger (3 episodes)
- 2000 : Drop the Beat I and II (4 episodes)
- 2001-2002 : Vampire High (6 episodes)
- 2001-2002 : Big Wolf on Campus (4 episodes)
- 2002 : Exils
- 2003 : 3X Rien (13 episodes)
- 2004 : Les Bougon II (12 episodes)
- 2004 : Au nom de la loi
- 2005-2007 : Minuit, le soir I, II, III
- 2006 : C.A. I, II
- 2011 : 19-2
- 2011 : Xanadu
- 2012 : Tu m'aimes-tu ?
- 2013 : Vikings
- 2017 : Cardinal
- 2020 : À propos d'Antoine
- 2024 : La Maison, Apple TV
