= Le nouveau show =

Television series

- Genre: Sketch comedy
- Starring: Katherine Levac; Virginie Fortin; Léane Labrèche-Dor; Pier-Luc Funk; Mathieu Quesnel; Guillaume Girard; Mickaël Gouin; Phil Roy
- Country of origin: Canada
- Original language: French
- No. of seasons: 1
- No. of episodes: 10

Production
- Running time: 30 minutes

Original release
- Network: Ici Radio-Canada Télé

Le nouveau show is a Canadian sketch comedy series, which premiered as a web series on TOU.TV in 2015 before airing on ICI ARTV and Ici Radio-Canada Télé in 2016. The series was created by the same cast and crew who had previously created SNL Québec, after that show was cancelled by Télé-Québec earlier in 2015.

The show's core cast members are Katherine Levac, Virginie Fortin, Léane Labrèche-Dor, Pier-Luc Funk, Mathieu Quesnel, Guillaume Girard, Mickaël Gouin and Phil Roy. Where SNL Québec had been created as a local adaptation of Saturday Night Live, Le nouveau show dropped SNL-related elements such as guest hosts, musical performers and Les nouvelles SNL, instead restricting itself to a straight sketch comedy troupe format.
