= Minuit, le soir =

- Minuit, le soir logo
- Created by: Pierre-Yves Bernard; Claude Legault (co-writer)
- Starring: Claude Legault; Julien Poulin; Louis Champagne; Julie Perreault
- Country of origin: Canada
- Original language: French
- No. of episodes: 37

Production
- Executive producers: Michel Bissonnette; Paul Dupont-Hébert; André Larin; Vincent Leduc
- Production locations: Montreal, Quebec, Canada
- Camera setup: Single camera
- Running time: 22 minutes

Original release
- Network: Radio-Canada
- Release: January 12, 2005 – March 29, 2007

Minuit, le soir (French: Midnight, in the evening) is a character-driven Quebec television show. Set and shot in Montreal, the 30-minute show revolves around the lives of three bouncers, both in private and at work. The show is notable for its portrayal of the daily hardships facing each of the principal characters. Gritty cinematography and fast-paced direction are also key elements of the show's style. All the show's episodes were directed by Daniel Grou (aka Podz).

Aired by public broadcaster Radio-Canada, the show achieved critical acclaim in local media and among viewers, reaching on average 1.3 million people during its first season. Minuit, le soir eventually won 17 Gémeaux Awards for its three seasons, the local equivalent of the American Emmys, the Geminis in other Canadian provinces or the British Academy Television Awards.

The title of the show evokes the bouncers' work cycle and the fact they work at night. Although title screens and promotional logos do not include the comma between minuit and le, it does appears officially in the show's title.

Minuit, le soir aired for three seasons, ending its run in 2007.

== Plot ==
Minuit, le soir is a series about three nightclub bouncers at The Manhattan, a fictional bar set in downtown Montreal. At first, all three seem successful: they enjoy working together and feel comfortable, achieving the rough-and-tough persona of the stereotypical bouncer. In an unexpected move, their aging boss sells his bar to an up-and-coming Italian-Canadian nightclub owner, after more than some insistence on her part.

Citing better standards she fires all three main protagonists. She intends on increasing the appeal of the bar by employing inexperienced yet good-looking young men to fill their positions. Nonetheless, one of the terminated bouncers successfully convinces the new owner to reinstate all three employees, showing their love for the job and indispensable experience. After reassembling her team of bouncers, the new owner renames the bar to Le Sas (The Airlock) and assigns the doormen to her other nightclubs in the city, including Le Joystick, a gay BDSM venue.

Minuit, le soir follows the characters working and off the job. The three bouncers are usually shown together being that they are coworkers and lifelong friends. The venues include the various bars, a park where the men procrastinate and their respective apartments.

The show evolves quite rapidly, both visually and story-wise, given its half-hour format combined to a dramatic plot. The camera is at times nervous, at times fluid and often transitions through tracking shots of the city.

Music is a central part of the show. In the club scenes, pounding house, mostly written by Mathieu Desaulniers, DJ Kal & Marco G. In the key moments, a haunting cello-based score () written by Nicolas Maranda () often takes over. The team won the 2007 Gémeaux award for their efforts. The music also promotes local artists by playing their songs during club scenes.

== Characters ==
=== Principals ===
- Marc Forest (Claude Legault): Forest (nicknamed "P'tit") is a tough doorman who initially handles the nightclub's unwanteds. He is revealed as a sensitive man concerned with his friends, the bar's customers and—eventually—his new boss, Fanny. An ongoing quirk of the show, Marc seems to be unable to keep his pets alive; they all die in rather weird circumstances and he buries them in his backyard. He also cannot keep a woman overnight and he uses noisy tapes to scare them away after they've had sex.
- Gaétan Langlois (Julien Poulin): Gaétan (nicknamed "Vieux") is the eldest of the bouncers, a simple and honest man in his fifties. Concerned with his image in a world of beauty and youthfulness, Gaétan tries to fit in. He, for example, removes his glasses while working, a clear negligence considering the importance of eyesight in his profession. During the first season, Gaétan reveals to his friends he is illiterate—an issue unveiled on screen by morphing all the letters in Gaétan's view with unintelligible symbols. He also falls in love with a high-class escort, many times his junior.
- Louis Bergeron (Louis Champagne): Louis (nicknamed "Gros") is the third member of the team of bouncers and the funny guy among them. Concerned with his weight, he also has trouble keeping a stable relationship. He breaks up with his girlfriend Sylviane during the first season, notably because of a costume fetish. Louis also works for the city's public works in the daytime. He portrays a widespread cliché among the Québécois that Montréal public workers (the cols bleus, literally blue collars) never actually work. His remarks concerning working hours, unionism and attendance often provoke laughter among his friends—and the audience.
- Fanny Campagnolo (Julie Perreault): Fanny is the nightclub owner. Born and raised in an Italian-Canadian family, she initially buys one of her bars from her father, in whose steps she evolves. Somewhat naïve, she makes various business and personal decisions that deeply affect her self-esteem and resolve.

=== Supporting ===
- Yan (Stéphane Gagnon) and Stevie (Henri Prado), the younger bouncers
- Brigitte (Julie Le Breton), the escort
- Sylviane (France Parent), Louis's ex-girlfriend
- James (James Gill), the bartender
- Paolo Campagnolo (Dino Tavarone), Fanny's father

=== Awards ===
Minuit, le soir won a total of 17 Gémeaux Awards :

2005 (first season)

- Best Lead Actor in a Drama Series for Claude Legault
- Best Editing for a Series

2006 (second season)

- Best Drama Series
- Best Lead Actor in a Drama Series for Claude Legault
- Best Directing for a Drama Series
- Best Writing for a Drama Series
- Best Editing for a Series
- Best Cinematography for a Series
- Best Art Direction for All Categories
- Jean-Besré Award

2007 (third season)

- Best Drama Series
- Best Supporting Actor in a Drama Series for Julien Poulin
- Best Directing for a Drama Series
- Best Writing for a Drama Series
- Best Editing for a Series
- Best Sound for a Series
- Best Original Music Score for a Series
