= Q052 =

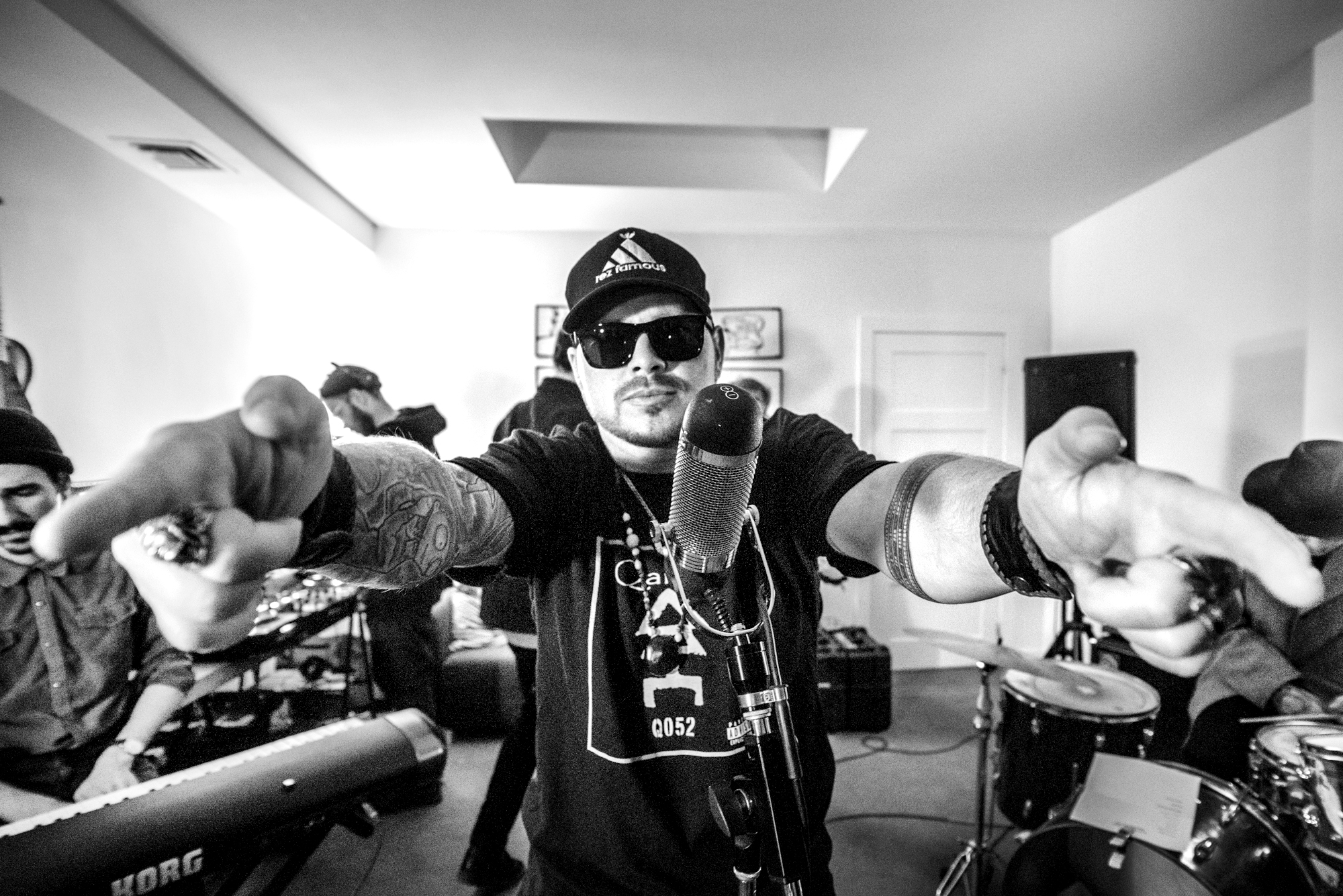

Background information
- Born: Quentin Condo
- Origin: Gesgapegiag, Quebec, Canada
- Genres: Rap
- Occupation: Rapper
- Years active: 2018–present

Q052 is the stage name of Quentin Condo, a Mi'kmaq rapper from Gesgapegiag, Quebec. He is most noted as a Felix Award nominee for Indigenous Artist of the Year at the 43rd Félix Awards in 2021.

His stage name is derived from his first initial and the government bureaucratic code for Gesgapegiag.

He released his debut album, Rez Life, in 2018, and followed up in 2019 with Qama'si. He released several singles in 2020 and 2021 before releasing three full-length albums, ImagiNation (March), The Storm (April), and The Calm (May), in 2022. ImagiNation received a nomination for Best Rap/Hip Hop Album at the 2022 GAMIQ awards.

In 2025 he was announced as having a supporting role in the upcoming television series adaptation of Bon Cop, Bad Cop, and has also been credited as one of the show's writers.
