= Two Days Before Christmas =

- French: 23 décembre
- Directed by: Miryam Bouchard
- Written by: India Desjardins
- Produced by: Guillaume Lespérance
- Starring: François Arnaud; Guylaine Tremblay; Catherine Brunet; Stéphane Rousseau
- Cinematography: Donat Chabot
- Edited by: Yvann Thibaudeau
- Music by: Mathieu Vanasse
- Production company: A Média Films
- Distributed by: Immina Films
- Release date: November 25, 2022
- Running time: 102 minutes
- Country: Canada
- Language: French

Two Days Before Christmas (French: 23 décembre, lit. "December 23") is a Canadian romantic comedy film, directed by Miryam Bouchard and released in 2022. Inspired in part by the 2003 film Love Actually, the film stars an ensemble cast of Quebec actors in two separate stories about love and romance in the last two days before Christmas.

The cast includes Virginie Fortin as Elsa, a single writer still pining for her childhood friend David (Sacha Charles); Catherine Brunet as her sister Stéphanie, who is expecting her first child with her husband Alex (François Arnaud) and planning a romantic getaway for the couple to experience their last Christmas as a couple whose lives will not be dominated by parenthood; Guylaine Tremblay as Marie-France, Elsa and Stéphanie's mother who upends both women's Christmas plans when she calls with the news that their father has had a heart attack; and Stéphane Rousseau as Antoine, a pop star who is married to Madeleine (Marie-Hélène Thibault) but is having an affair on tour with his press agent Jessica (Catherine Souffront).

The film opened in theatres on November 25, 2022.

In January 2023, the film became the highest-grossing Quebec film at the box office since Compulsive Liar (Menteur) in 2019.

== Awards ==
Award	Date of ceremony	Category	Recipient(s)	Result	Ref(s)
Canadian Screen Awards	April 14, 2023	Golden Screen Award	Guillaume Lespérance	Won	
Prix Iris	December 10, 2023	Revelation of the Year	Virginie Fortin	Nominated	
Prix Iris	December 10, 2023	Public Prize	Patrick Roy, Guillaume Lespérance, Miryam Bouchard, India Desjardins	Nominated	
