= Bon Cop, Bad Cop 2 =

- Directed by: Alain DesRochers
- Written by: Patrick Huard
- Produced by: Pierre Even; Patrick Huard; François Flamand
- Starring: Patrick Huard; Colm Feore; Sarah-Jeanne Labrosse; Erik Knudsen; Noam Jenkins; John Moore
- Cinematography: Ronald Plante
- Edited by: Jean-François Bergeron
- Music by: Anik Jean
- Production companies: Item 7 Jessie Films
- Distributed by: Les Films Séville
- Release date: May 12, 2017
- Running time: 126 minutes
- Country: Canada
- Languages: English; French
- Budget: $10 million CAD
- Box office: $7 million

Bon Cop, Bad Cop 2 is a 2017 Canadian action comedy film directed by Alain DesRochers. A sequel to the 2006 film Bon Cop, Bad Cop, it stars Colm Feore and Patrick Huard in a reprisal of their original roles. Filmed in Montreal with a budget of $10 million, the film earned $7 million at the box office. It was also one of the highest-grossing Canadian films of 2017. The film was nominated for Achievement in Make-up at the 2018 Canadian Screen Awards.

== Plot ==
David Bouchard steals a street-racing car in Montreal, eludes pursuers, and delivers it to a chop shop. Shortly after, the Royal Canadian Mounted Police (RCMP) (Note: Ward initially identifies himself as GRC – Gendarmerie Royale du Canada – the French name for the Royal Canadian Mounted Police.) raid the garage, led by David's old colleague, Martin Ward. While fighting, David tells Martin that he is working for the Sûreté du Québec, and they improvise a scenario for David to escape while preserving his cover. They decide to combine their investigations but when David calls them partners, Martin notes that he will be in charge. David crashes the get-away vehicle, is shot, and takes drugs to make his escape story believable to mob boss Sylvio DiPietro and his henchman Mike Dubois.

DiPietro announces that he needs 25 cars in 5 days. While staying at a strip club run by Mike, David observes the customers behind this mysterious order. Martin follows the three men to the Consulate General of the United States, Montreal, but when he returns the next day, he is obstructed by bureaucrats and gains no information.

Mike remains suspicious of David's escape from the raid and shows DiPietro evidence implicating David of collusion with Martin. Martin learns of this through surveillance and orders David to abort the operation, but David refuses and returns to DiPietro's headquarters, where he is tasked with delivering a stolen car across the border to Maine. When David arrives at a small town main street, surveillance of DiPietro and his customers leads Martin to believe they are preparing to remotely detonate a car bomb. Martin orders David to run, which he does after driving the car away from innocent bystanders. The car explodes and David surrenders to inept local law enforcement.

The FBI led by Agent Blaine arrive after several hours, followed shortly by Martin who is promptly arrested. Handcuffed together in the interrogation room, Martin and David discuss their lives: David's daughter is entering the provincial police academy while Martin is estranged from his son Jonathan – whom he hasn't been able to tell about his Lou Gehrig's disease diagnosis. They vow to solve the case so that Martin can retire as a hero. The next morning, Blaine releases them, dismissing their warnings and treating the explosion as an isolated incident.

Returning to Montreal, David and Martin find their operation has been shut down with only their security hacker MC remaining; they decide to continue without authorization. DiPietro's gang have scattered; they find Mike at the strip club and capture him. While initially resistant to interrogation, Mike feels himself in jeopardy when Martin reveals that he's dying and has nothing to lose. The three go to the location where the last five stolen cars are departing. David takes Mike hostage, but DiPietro shoots him dead and David shoots back wounding DiPietro before cuffing him to Mike's body. From a high vantage point, Martin shoots three of the five drivers with a rifle, but one of those he hadn't shoot is Jonathan who drives away. The remaining car bombs are taken and thrown into a Sewer by David, which causes a big explosion and a scaffolding to fall down and crush DiPietro to death. Martin is distraught, initially believing Jonathan is dead, but MC determines that his car is still moving and they have a chance if they can stop the control system.

David and Martin return to the US consulate where Blaine and his three conspirators discuss how their false flag operation will renew the American war on terror and make them heroes. Blaine is alerted to David and Martin's presence and takes them to his office, where he tells them that they were right and that the FBI has seized most of the car bombs and the computers. However, MC calls Martin warning that the signal is still active. Questioned, Blaine realizes he has been exposed and aims his pistol at them, but David and Martin overpower him and escape in a consulate car. MC directs them to the mobile transmitter which is in an armoured truck. They stop it but the occupant of the locked rear compartment shoots himself in defiance. Martin desperately tries to drive the truck into the river but David interferes, resulting in the truck crashing. They then use a nearby mobile crane to carry the truck to the river, where they drop it, flooding the rear compartment and disabling the transmitter.

Jonathan has delivered his stolen car to the Islamic Cultural Center of New York. He hears another driver being arrested while discussing social plans by phone. Terrified, he phones Martin who gives him instructions to leave the scene and seek protection at the Canadian consulate.

Several months later, David and Martin attend a formal ceremony where they are awarded the Medal of Honor by the US president. Among those in the audience are Jonathan, apparently reconciled with his father, and Bouchard's daughter who is wearing a police cadet uniform.

== Themes ==
The film touches on what seems to be a political angle, with some satire thrown at the US, but actor Colm Feore expresses that they are trying to convey a sociological message, in that Canadians and Americans have fundamental differences. The actor goes on to say that it's also a jab at Americans for their ignorance of Canadian culture over the years. One way this is portrayed in the film is when local US law enforcement officers cannot identify the Quebec French David Bouchard is speaking or agree on the existence of French Canadians.

== Cast ==
- Patrick Huard – David Bouchard
- Colm Feore – Martin Ward
- Marc Beaupré – Mike Dubois
- Noam Jenkins – Sylvio DiPietro
- Andreas Apergis – Agent Blaine
- Mariana Mazza – MC
- Erik Knudsen – Jonathan Ward
- Sarah-Jeanne Labrosse – Gabrielle Bouchard
- Lucie Laurier – Suzie Bouchard

== Production ==
Huard, a prominent public figure in Quebec, has an extensive background in Canadian entertainment. As screenplay writer, producer, and lead actor, Huard played an active role in the overall production of the film. He was first inspired to write the series original film Bon Cop, Bad Cop during a performed comedic monologue at the Genie Awards in 2003. The actor played on linguistic and cultural differences, and realized those were the very things that perhaps separated, and also united Franco and Anglo-Canadian audiences. He claims "The one thing we can laugh about together is our differences. That's when I had a flash for Bon Cop."

Production of the film began in Montreal and the Eastern Townships (including Richmond in the bridge scene) in May 2016. Unlike the original film, which derived much of its humour from the culture clash between English Canada and Quebec, the sequel's script downplays that aspect in favour of a focus on Canada's relationship with the United States. The cast also includes radio broadcaster John Moore as the President of the United States. Colm Feore claims that "the wonderful thing about the movie is the way it capitalizes on cultural differences for laughs, but never puts one side above the other." This same narrative is carried throughout the sequel, with more humour and action. Screenplay writer Huard says in an interview that there is a much less "combative tone" between the two cops, and that the film also tells a story about friendship.

Michael Madsen was slated to appear in the film as an FBI agent, but was forced to drop out for health reasons and was replaced by Andreas Apergis.

== Reception ==
=== Box office ===
The film was a box office failure, managing to gross only $7 million against a budget of $10 million.

=== Critical response ===
On review aggregator website Rotten Tomatoes, the film holds a 75% approval rating based on eight reviews, with an average score of 6.1/10.
