= Au nom de la loi =

- Genre: Crime drama
- Written by: Michelle Allen; Isabelle Poissant
- Directed by: PodZ
- Starring: Patrick Huard; Jacynthe René; Louis Champagne
- Country of origin: Canada
- Original language: French
- No. of seasons: 1
- No. of episodes: 10

Production
- Executive producers: Jacquelin Bouchard; Sylvie Desrochers; Carole Dufour
- Producer: André Dupuy
- Running time: 50 minutes
- Production company: Productions Pixcom

Original release
- Network: ICI Radio-Canada Télé
- Release: September 15 – November 17, 2005

Au nom de la loi ("In The Name of the Law") is a limited-run Quebecois téléroman series on Ici Radio-Canada Télé. Ten 50-minute episodes were broadcast from September 15 to November 17, 2005.

== Synopsis ==
In 1993, Simon Pelletier is sentenced to life in prison for murder. Protesting his innocence, he reaches the end of his tether after twelve years of prison and legal proceedings. He escapes, and with the help of Scorpion, an ex-convict, he kidnaps Lavigne, a police officer who took part in his conviction.

== Cast ==
- Patrick Huard as Simon Pelletier
- Jacynthe René as Céline Desjardins
- Louis Champagne as Scorpion
- Réal Bossé as Marc Lavigne
- Rosalie Julien as Nadine Théorêt
- Benoît Gouin as Robert Duranleau
- Marie Turgeon as Judith Castonguay
- Mélanie Pilon as Liliane Lacroix
- Nicolas Canuel as Raynald Jetté
- Jean Harvey as François Perreault
- Mélissa Flynn as Diane Piché
- Jean Petitclerc as Daniel Bernier
- Suzanne Garceau as Denise Desjardins
- Évelyne Rompré as Julie Lavigne
- Denis Bernard as Jean-Luc Therrien
- Violette Chauveau as Lucille Therrien
- Sophie Bourgeois as Anne Beauchamp
- Bobby Beshro as Tomek Rudnicki
- Pierre Chagnon as Maître Delorme
