= Mickaël Gouin =

Canadian actor

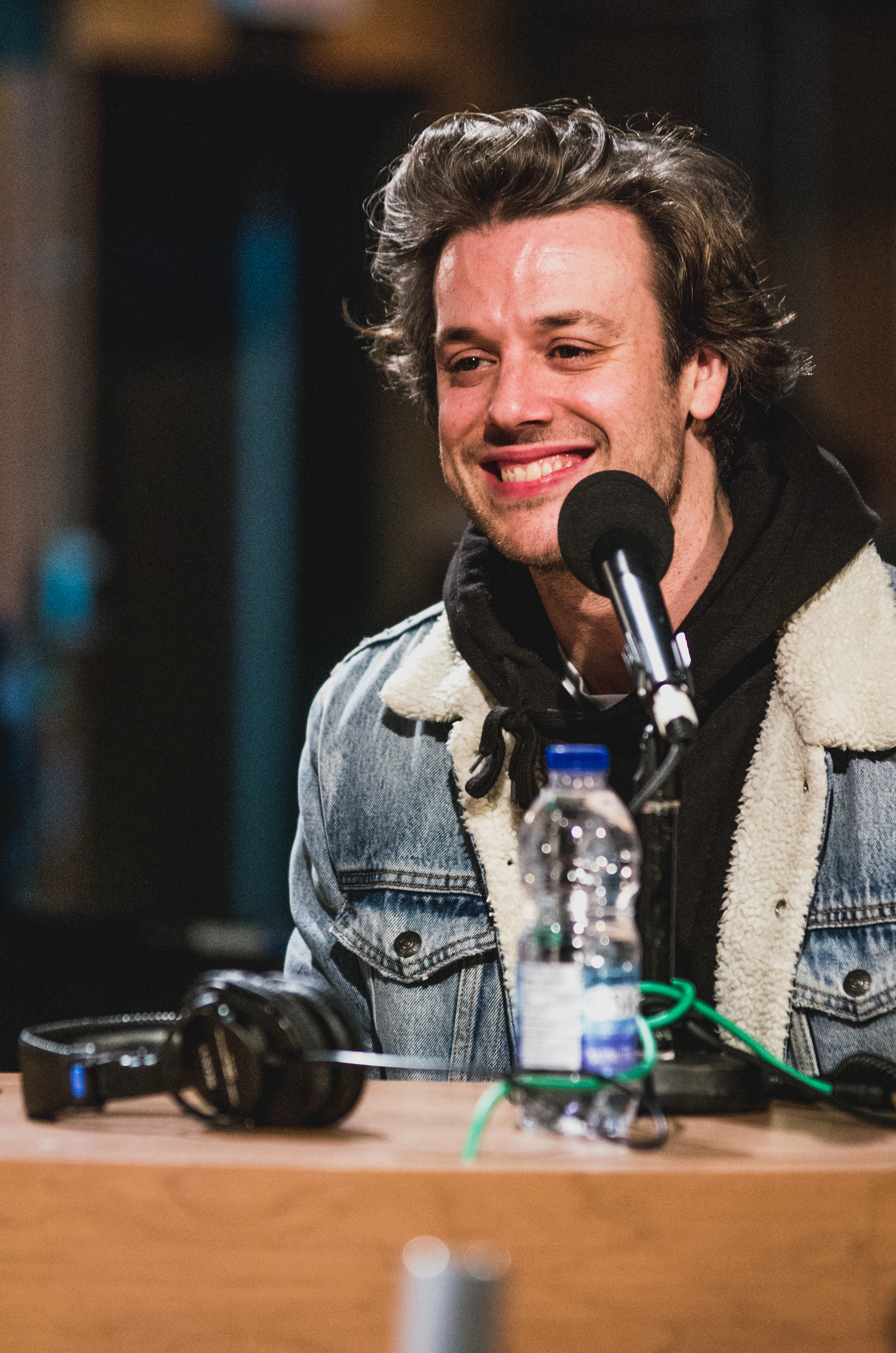
- Born: Drummondville, Quebec
- Occupations: actor, writer
- Years active: 2010s-present
- Known for: SNL Québec, Le nouveau show, Escouade 99

Mickaël Gouin is a Canadian actor and television writer from Drummondville, Quebec. He is most noted for his role in the sketch comedy series SNL Québec, the Quebec adaptation of Saturday Night Live, and its spinoff Le nouveau show.

He has also appeared in the films Our Loved Ones (Nos êtres chers), Nelly, Barefoot at Dawn (Pieds nus dans l'aube), Underground (Souterrain), The Greatest Country in the World (Le meilleur pays du monde), Lines of Escape (Lignes de fuite) and 1995, the television series 19-2, Mon ex à moi, Hubert et Fanny, En tout cas and Escouade 99, and the web series Pitch, 7$ par jour, La règle de 3 and Adulthood (L'Âge adulte). He won a Prix Gémeaux for Best Original Series Produced for Digital Media: Comedy, Variety in 2014 as a co-creator of Pitch.

He is in a romantic relationship with his frequent costar Léane Labrèche-Dor. In 2018 he premiered the comedic theatrical show On t'aime Mickaël Gouin, in which he and Labrèche-Dor played fictionalized versions of themselves.
