= Anais Pouliot =

Canadian model

- Born: Saguenay, Quebec, Canada
- Occupation: Model
- Modeling information
- Height: 1.78 m (5 ft 10 in)
- Agency: New York Model Management (New York); Elite Model Management (Paris, Copenhagen); Women Management (Milan); Models 1 (London); Uno Models (Barcelona); Model Management (Hamburg); Modelink (Stockholm); Folio Montreal (Montreal) (mother agency)

Anais Pouliot (English: /ˈpuːlioʊ/, French: [puljo]) is a Canadian model. Born in Chicoutimi, Quebec, Pouliot now lives in New York City.

== Career ==
She has been featured on adverts for, among others, Louis Vuitton, Nina Ricci, Topshop, Sonia Rykiel, Aldo, H&M, Yves Saint Laurent, Carven, Anna Sui, Mugler, Mih jeans, Emporio Armani, Lancôme, Urban Outfitters, Tod's, Kate Spade, Nasty Gal and Barneys New York.

She has been on numerous magazine covers, including Vogue, Acne Paper, Elle, Fashion, Oyster, Vogue UK, L'Express, Le Monde, L'Officiel, Marie Claire and Air France Madame.

She often poses for Victoria's Secret website and catalogues.

She is said to be a friend of Miuccia Prada. To that, she answers "Let's say she recognizes me when she meets me on the street, and she smiles at me." She is also one of Terry Richardson's favorite models.
