= A No-Hit No-Run Summer =

- French: Un été sans point ni coup sûr
- Directed by: Francis Leclerc
- Written by: Marc Robitaille
- Produced by: Barbara Shrier
- Starring: Patrice Robitaille; Pier-Luc Funk; Jacinthe Laguë; Roy Dupuis; Peter Batakliev
- Cinematography: Steve Asselin
- Edited by: Glenn Berman
- Music by: Carl Bastien; Luc Sicard
- Release date: 2008
- Running time: 104 min.
- Country: Canada
- Language: French

A No-Hit No-Run Summer (French: Un été sans point ni coup sûr) is a Canadian sports drama film, directed by Francis Leclerc and released in 2008.

Written by Marc Robitaille as an adaptation of his own novel, the film is set in the late 1960s and stars Pier-Luc Funk as Martin, a young boy who loves baseball and dreams of someday playing for the new Montreal Expos. He is disappointed when he is not chosen for the local youth baseball team by coach Gilbert Turcotte (Roy Dupuis), but his hope is restored when his father Charles (Patrice Robitaille) decides to organize and coach a new baseball team for the kids who didn't make it onto Turcotte's team.

The film received two Prix Jutra nominations at the 11th Jutra Awards in 2009, for Best Editing (Glenn Berman) and Best Original Music (Carl Bastien, Luc Sicard).

== Cast ==
- Patrice Robitaille as Charles
- Pier-Luc Funk as Martin
- Jacinthe Laguë as Mireille
- Roy Dupuis as Gilbert Turcotte
- Peter Batakliev as Monsieur B
- Frédérique Dufort as Sophie
- Phillip Jarrett as Mack Jones
- Guy-Daniel Tremblay as Fern
- Guy Thauvette as M. Audet
- Victor Desjardins as Grand Pete

== Music ==
In addition to Fernand Lapierre's recording of the Montreal Expos theme song "Les Expos sont là", the film's soundtrack included a number of popular French and English songs from the era. Most were rerecorded as new covers by contemporary Quebec artists, although Robert Charlebois and Louise Forestier's "Lindberg" was included in its original version, and a few songs, including the theme to the television sitcom Gilligan's Island, were sung diegetically by the film's own cast.

- "Je reviens chez nous" (Jean-Pierre Ferland) - Fernand Lapierre
- "Les Expos sont là" (Marc Gélinas, Marcel Lefebvre) - Fernand Lapierre
- "L'amour est bleu" (André Popp, Pierre Cour) - Luc Sicard and Carl Bastien
- "People Got to Be Free" (Felix Cavaliere, Eddie Brigati) - Louis Larivière
- "Working for the Man" (Roy Orbison) - Luck Mervil
- "Daydream" (John Sebastian) - Ariane Moffatt
- "The Ballad of Gilligan's Isle" (George Wyle, Sherwood Schwartz) - Pier-Luc Funk, Victor Desjardins, Simon Pigeon, Jean Carl Boucher
- "California Dreamin'" (John Phillips, Michelle Philips) - Luck Mervil, Daniel Bélanger, Ariane Moffatt, Marie-Pierre Arthur
- "Sunshine Superman" (Donovan) - Daniel Bélanger
- "These Eyes" (Randy Bachman, Burton Cummings) - Béatrice Bonifassi
- "Lindberg" (Robert Charlebois, Claude Péloquin) - Robert Charlebois, Louise Forestier
- "The House of the Rising Sun" (Alan Price) - Sandrine St-Onge, Frédérique Dufort
