= Heads or Tails (1997 film) =

J'en suis!
- Directed by: Claude Fournier
- Written by: Claude Fournier; Marie-José Raymond
- Produced by: Mychèle Boudrias; Marie-José Raymond
- Starring: Roy Dupuis; Patrick Huard
- Cinematography: Eric Cayla
- Edited by: Denis Papillon
- Music by: Dan Bigras
- Release date: 1997
- Country: Canada
- Language: French

Heads or Tails (French: J'en suis!) is a 1997 Quebec comedy film directed by Claude Fournier and starring Roy Dupuis and Patrick Huard.

== Synopsis ==
In order to make money fast to put his company back on track, Dominique (Roy Dupuis) encouraged by his business partner Pierre Sanchez (Patrick Huard) finds a job as an antique dealer for Victor (Normand Lévesque). But soon he realizes that the only way he will keep his job is by pretending he is gay, slowly breaking his marriage with his wife Maude (Charlotte Laurier) and stirring weird emotions from his mother Elisabeth (France Castel).

== Cast ==
- Roy Dupuis (Dominique Samson)
- Patrick Huard (Pierre Sanchez)
- Charlotte Laurier (Maude)
- Albert Millaire (De Beauregard)
- Normand Lévesque (Victor)
- Guy Nadon (Dr. Lamoureux)
- France Castel (Elisabeth Ballester)
- Arielle Dombasle (Rose Petipas)
- Sophie Faucher (La Sodoma)
- Nanette Workman (Sandy Klein)
- Jacques Languirand (Igor de Lonsdale)
- Micheline Lanctôt (Huissier Saisibec)
- Jean-Guy Bouchard
- Dan Bigras
- Martin Thibodeau (Motard)
- Claude Rajotte
- Paul Buissonneau (Metteur en scène)
- Annie Dufresne (Sophie)
- Paul-Antoine Taillefer (Hugo)
- Louis Champagne (Minister of Culture)
- Marie-Anne Larochelle (Corinne)
- Xavier Dolan-Tadros (Edouard)
- Maude Guérin (Mimi)
- Jacynthe René (Solange)
- Julien Bessette (Monsieur Corbeil)
- Patrice Robergeau (Taxi driver)
- Martin David Peters (Sacha)
- Luc D'Arcy (Elektra)
- Jean Charest (Anatole Bouffant)
- Luc Charpentier (Andrew L.)
- Yanek Gadzala (De Gaulle)
