= Pier-Luc Funk =

Canadian actor

- Born: May 5, 1994 (age 32); Laval, Quebec, Canada
- Occupation: Actor
- Years active: 2008–present
- Known for: A No-Hit No-Run Summer, Genesis, Mémoires vives

Pier-Luc Funk (born May 5, 1994) is a Canadian film and television actor. He is most noted for his role as Maxime in the 2018 film Genesis (Genèse), for which he received a Prix Iris nomination for Best Supporting Actor at the 21st Quebec Cinema Awards.

Funk had his first acting role in childhood, as the protagonist of the 2008 film A No-Hit No-Run Summer (Un été sans point ni coup sûr). Following that he joined the cast of the teen drama series Tactik, in which he played Samuel Langevin from 2009 to 2013.

In 2014 and 2015 he was a cast member in SNL Québec, a Quebec-based adaptation of Saturday Night Live. After the show was cancelled by Télé-Québec in 2015, he joined the cast of the new series Le nouveau show. In the same year he joined the cast of the drama series Mémoires vives as Jérémie, a sinister character who plotted and carried out a kidnapping of the main character's daughter. In 2017, he won the Prix Gémeaux for Best Actor in a Drama Series for Mémoires vives, the youngest actor to win in the history of the category.

In 2021 Funk hosted Sans rancune, a TVA variety series. In an episode devoted to drag queens in February, Funk participated in a lipsync battle against Rita Baga.

== Filmography ==
- 2008 - A No-Hit No-Run Summer (Un été sans point ni coup sûr): Martin
- 2013 - Vic and Flo Saw a Bear (Vic+Flo ont vu un ours): Charlot Smith
- 2014 - 1987: Dallaire
- 2015 - The Demons (Les Démons): Ben
- 2015 - Aurélie Laflamme: Les pieds sur terre: Jean-Benoît Houde
- 2016 - Kiss Me Like a Lover (Embrasse-moi comme tu m'aimes): Donat
- 2017 - Sashinka: Prêteur sur gages
- 2018 - Genesis (Genèse): Maxime
- 2019 - Matthias & Maxime: Rivette
- 2020 - Flashwood: Luc
- 2021 - Entre deux draps: Antoine
- 2021 - The Time Thief (L'Arracheuse de temps)
- 2024 - You Are Not Alone (Vous n'êtes pas seul)
- 2024 - Vile & Miserable (Vil & Misérable)
- 2026 - 125, rue des Malaises
