= Mih jeans =

British clothing company

MiH Jeans is a British make of jeans. It was founded in 2005 by Chloe Lonsdale.

In 2010, MiH Jeans and Liberty's produced two limited-edition jeans styles, one printed with Liberty's "Dakota" design, the other in flared purple velvet.

From December 2011, some MiH Jeans products have been marketed by Shopbop.
