= Michel Beaudry =

Canadian judge

Judge of the Federal Court of Canada
- In office July 2, 2003 – June 12, 2016

Personal details
- Born: June 12, 1941 (age 84) Noranda, Quebec

Michel Beaudry (born June 12, 1941) is a former judge of the Federal Court of Canada.
