= Anik Jean =

- Born: April 11, 1977 (age 49); Bonaventure, Quebec, Canada
- Genres: Pop rock, folk rock
- Occupation: Singer-songwriter
- Instruments: Vocals, guitar
- Years active: 2010-present
- Labels: Tacca Musique, Sphère Musique, Nathan Records

Anik Jean (born April 11, 1977) is a Canadian pop and rock singer, actress, director, and screenwriter. She is most noted for her 2005 album Le Trashy Saloon, which was a shortlisted Juno Award finalist for Francophone Album of the Year at the Juno Awards of 2006.

== Career ==
From a young age, Anik Jean has been drawn to performing. Attending a David Bowie concert with her mother when she was 11 years old, Anik decided she wanted to be a singer-songwriter. She learned how to play guitar and piano and embarked on a trip that would take her from her native Gaspésie to Los Angeles before eventually returning to Montreal.

In the spring of 2005, her first single, "Je suis partie", topped the Top 5 on the radio charts in Quebec, which laid the groundwork for the release of her debut album Le Trashy Saloon in August of that same year. The song was written by Anik's mentor, Quebec rock legend, Jean Leloup, who also co-produced the album with David Strutton. Anik cowrote the follow-up single, "Junkie de toi", with Jean Leloup, and rose ever higher than before on the top 40 charts. She opened for The Rolling Stones at their concert in Montreal in January 2006.

For her second album in 2008, Anik worked with Mark Plati, the producer for David Bowie, Alain Bashung, Louise Attaque and Les Rita Mitsouko. She was backed by musicians: Earl Slick, Mike Garson, Sam Harrison, Jean-Sébastien Chouinard, Alec McElcheran, Julien Blais and Antoine Gratton. She released her second album, Le ciel saigne le martyre, a rock record that demonstrates the artists growing maturity. The first single, Oh mon chéri, rose in the charts quickly and caused a sensation among her growing fans.

In 2010, Anik Jean produced her third album herself, the self-titled, Anik Jean. Recording in New York and Montréal, the singer-songwriter co-wrote some of the songs with her friend, Earl Slick, and finished the album with musical help from Gail Ann Dorsey and Sterling Campbell, two members of David Bowie's group. The single, J'aurai tout essayé, a duet with Robert Smith of The Cure, stayed at the top of the charts for nearly a year. The album was later nominated for "Best Pop Album" at the ADISQ awards.

She married actor and comedian Patrick Huard in 2011.

In 2013, Anik composed the music for Huard's new stand-up show; she made her on-screen debut in the film Filière 13 (File 13); and she worked with designer Marie Saint-Pierre. Her fourth album, Schizophrène, was inspired by her brother, who had schizophrenia. Recorded entirely in her home studio, the abstract and highly personal album was dedicated to her brother, who died that same year.

In 2015, Anik went back to basics for her first English-language album, Lost Soul which deviated from her typical rock style but being primarily composed of ballads. Her sound, however, remained reliably intense and the music became the soundtrack to a feature film of the same name which went on to be showcased at the two most prestigious film festivals in Quebec.

In 2016, Anik was asked to score her first film, the Canadian box office hit, Bon Cop Bad Cop 2. Her soundtrack won the SOCAN PRIZE for best film score in 2019.

Working on her music videos with directors Robin Aubert and Francis Leclerc, Anik was exposed to filmmaking, and she was immediately hooked. It all came together for her when she co-directed her feature, Lost Soul in 2015–2016.

Her second short film, La Porte, screened opening night at Québec Cinéma 2019 and was selected for the St. John's International Women's Film Festival, and her most recent work, Sois Sage, was presented at the Fantasia International Film Festival, with several of her film scripts in development.

In 2021, in parallel with the release of her second children's book Nathan at the Bottom of the Ocean, she is working on the original music for Escouade 99 (an adaptation of the Brooklyn Nine Nine series). In October, she released her new and highly anticipated sixth album Love in Silence.

In 2023, she released her debut feature film as a director, My Mother's Men (Les Hommes de ma mère). Nathan Jean-Huard, her son with Huard, had a small acting role in the film.

== Discography ==
Albums	Track list	Highlights
Le Trashy Saloon (2005)	1. Tendre Sorcière; 2. Je suis partie 3. Pense à toi 4. Numb; 5. Le trashy saloon 6. Junkie de toi 7. Amour absinthe 8. Into my dreams 9. Confession; 10. Let me go 11. Duel I, II, III; 12. Haine / Non	Number 1 on the radio for two weeks with « Junkie de toi » Cover of « Je suis partie » by Jean Leloup
Le ciel saigne le martyre (2008)	1. Thorazine; 2. Oh mon chéri - Le ciel saigne le martyre 3. Bouche; 4. L.A. 007; 5. Des anges dans le noir 6. Lucifer; 7. Veuve noire 8. La femme bionique 9. Si parfait 10. Petit coeur 11. Gaspésie; 12. Hurt / Orage	Number 1 on the radio for two weeks with « Oh mon chéri »
Anik Jean (2010)	1. J'aurai tout essayé 2. Je sais 3. Love-moi; 4. Plus de pitié 5. Run; 6. Insomnie; 7. Si tu le voulais 8. Le jour, la nuit 9. Mon Dieu; 10. Wild is the Wind; 11. Chaque matin 12. Je sais - Acoustique	The single « J'aurai tout essayé » duet with Robert Smith (The Cure) is standing at the top of the charts for almost a year. Cover of « Wild is the Wind » (Nina Simone, also performed by David Bowie), duet with Pierre Flynn on « Si tu le voulais » and an acoustic version of « Je sais »
Schizophrène (2013)	1. Mes démons 2. F** le dance 3. Minable; 4. À la vie, à la mort 5. Liste noire 6. Baise-moi; 7. Si tu m'entends 8. Bad Bad Girl; 9. Tu es mon enfer 10. Schizophrène	Album dedicated to her brother, recorded in her personal studio.
Lost Soul (2015)	1. Lost Soul; 2. Little Walk; 3. No More Time; 4. Absinthe My Love; 5. Black Birds; 6. Never Enough; 7. Closer; 8. Change Your Mind; 9. Hurt; 10. Mon chéri, pt. 2; 11. Shivers; 12. Closer - Radio Edit	Original album concept, soundtrack presented in projection-concert of the film of the same name.
Bon Cop Bad Cop 2 (2017) Original Motion Picture soundtrack	1. Bad Boy; 2. Hangar; 3. Meds In The Sun; 4. Alive - Bilingual Version; 5. Strip Pour Moi; 6. Just Enter; 7. Hold On - Piano Version; 8. On My Own; 9. The Bridge; 10. Black Diamond; 11. Middle Brook; 12. Heart For Lease; 13. Getting Ready; 14. Hold On (Bilingual Version); 15. L'échafaud; 16. Girlz; 17. Angel And Dust; 18. Push + Pull; 19. The Speech; 20. Alive; 21. Hold On	*SOCAN Film Music Award, 2019 – For the first time in 30 years, the prize is awarded to a woman
Love in Silence (2021)	1. Live or Die; 2. Can't Say; 3. Let's Go Down; 4. Fall Asleep; 5. Junkie de toi 6. Love in Silence; 7. Your Place; 8. La nuit 9. Waiting For the Miracle	

== Filmography ==
Title	Role
File 13 (Filière 13) (2010)	Actress (Mylène)
Sur les traces de la fusion: L'acte 1 (2012)	Composer
Lost Soul (2016)	Composer Co-director Actress (Laura) Writer Producer Production Design
Bon Cop, Bad Cop 2 (2017)	Composer
The Door (2019)	Composer Director Writer Producer
Sois Sage (2019)	Composer Director Actress (mother) Writer Producer
La Tour (2020-2021)	Composer Collaborator
My Mother's Men (Les Hommes de ma mère) (2023)	Director

== Books ==
- Nathan at the bottom of the ocean (2021)
- Nathan in the land of pirates (2020)
- Magnum 66 (2009)
