= Léane Labrèche-Dor =

Canadian actress (born 1988)

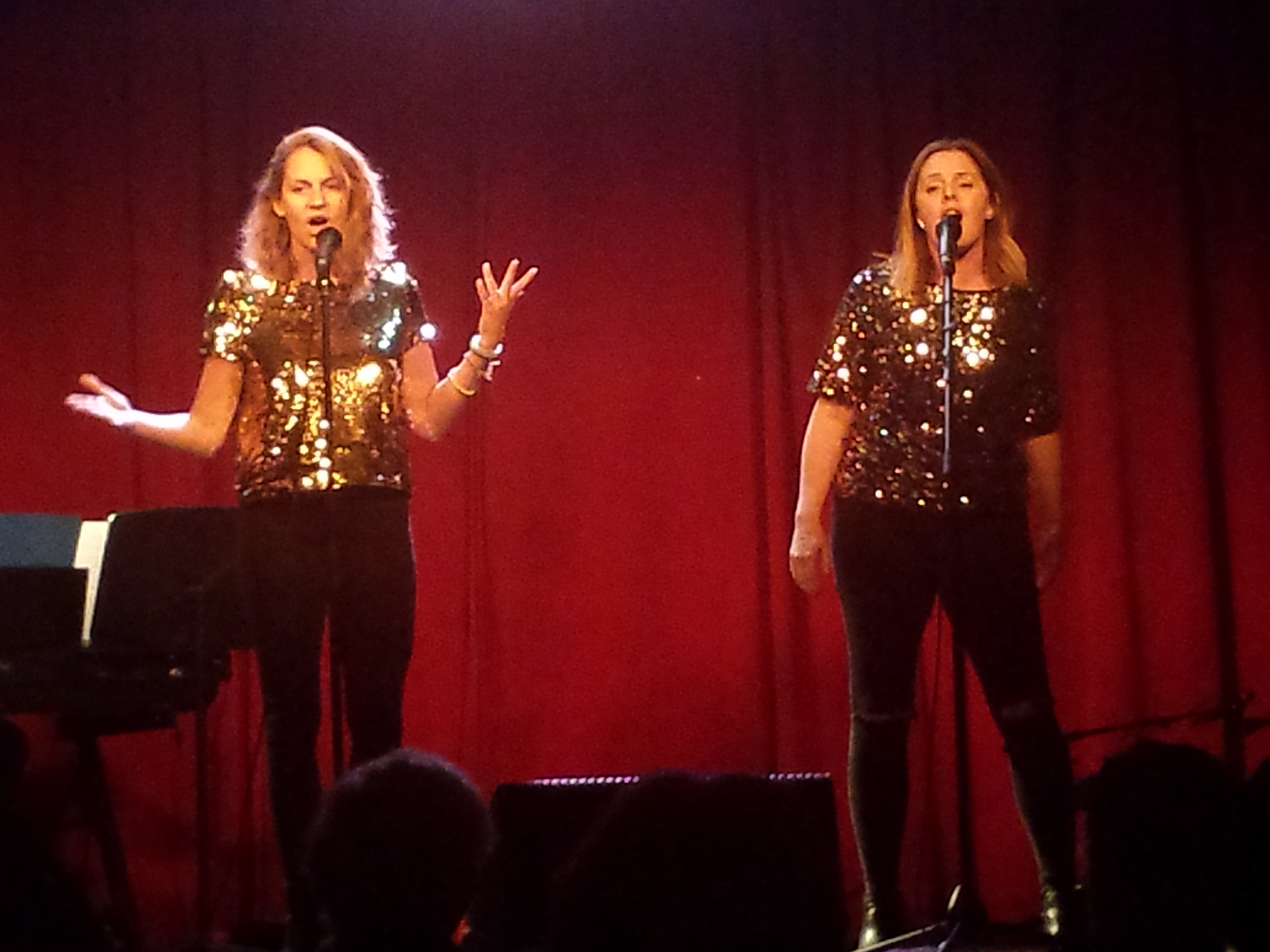
Catherine Trudeau and Léane Labrèche-Dor at La Sala Rossa

Léane Labrèche-Dor (born July 6, 1988) is a Canadian actress. She is most noted for her performances in the films Laughter (Le Rire), for which she received a Prix Iris nomination for Best Actress at the 22nd Quebec Cinema Awards, and My Mother's Men (Les hommes de ma mère), for which she received a Best Actress nomination at the 25th Quebec Cinema Awards in 2023.

Originally from Saint-Lambert, Quebec, she is a graduate of the National Theatre School of Canada.

In 2020 she appeared in Escouade 99, the Quebec television adaptation of Brooklyn Nine-Nine. She was also previously a cast member of SNL Québec, the shortlived Quebec adaptation of Saturday Night Live, and its spinoff series Le nouveau show. She has also appeared in the films Family First (Chien de garde) an Lines of Escape (Lignes de fuite).

She is in a romantic relationship with her frequent costar Mickaël Gouin.
