= Les Films Séville =

Canadian film distribution company

- Logo used from 2015 to 2022
- Formerly: Les Films Rene Malo (1974–1990); René Malo Vidéo (1983–1990); Malofilm (1990–1997); Behaviour Communications (1997–1999)
- Type: Incentive
- Industry: Film
- Predecessor: Alliance Vivafilm
- Founded: 1974 (as Les Films Rene Malo); 1983 (as René Malo Vidéo); 1990 (as Malofilm / Malofilm Home Video); 1997 (as Behaviour Communications); 1999 (as Les Films Séville); 2014 (as international unit)
- Defunct: 1997 (original); 2022 (as Les Films Séville)
- Fate: Folded into Entertainment One; Library acquired by Immina Films
- Successor: Company: eOne Films; Library: eOne Films (back catalogue); Immina Films (distribution rights excluding physical media)
- Headquarters: Montreal, Quebec, Canada
- Website: www.filmsseville.com (archived August 2018)

Les Films Séville (in English as Seville International or Seville Films, formerly Les Films Rene Malo, René Malo Vidéo, Malofilm and Malofilm Home Video; previously known in English as Séville Pictures) was a Canadian film distributor company. First based on Saint-André Boulevard in 1983, it moved its operations in 1993 to Saint Laurent Boulevard, as the Canadian branch of Republic Pictures Home Video and Turner Home Entertainment, distributing releases from the two companies into Canada. The company distributed Entertainment One’s movies in Quebec. Les Films Seville was defunct long before Hasbro acquired Entertainment One.

In 1999, Malofilm was renamed Les Films Séville, after a hostile merger with Industry Entertainment, and was acquired by Entertainment One in 2007. On May 31, 2000, Behaviour Worldwide was sold to MDP's old management, which changed its name back to MDP Worldwide.

== History ==
The company was founded in 1974 by chairman and CEO René Malo in Montreal, Quebec as Les Films Rene Malo. It expanded into home video distribution in 1983.

In late 1983, it was a founding partner of Videoglobe with many other companies, including Cinepix Inc. and The Multimedia Group of Canada, among others.

In 1987, Malofilm was a founding member of Image Organization with several other companies, notably Nelvana and New Star Entertainment.

In 1995, Malofilm acquired Desclez Productions and Megatoon Entertainment Group (MEG).

In 1996, Malofilm acquired ReadySoft Incorporated, a well known Canadian software company. Also that year, it bought out California film studio Image Organization for $1.8 million.

In 1997, Malofilm changed its name to Behaviour Communications, after Malo was forced to retire from the company for health reasons. On March 26, 1998, it bought out MDP Worldwide for $19.3 million, and changed its name to Behaviour Worldwide.

In 1999, Behaviour Interactive was sold to Rémi Racine and some investors, and was renamed Artificial Mind & Movement Inc. (A2M) the following year (it later returned to the name Behaviour Interactive in 2010).

In 1999, Behavior Communications was renamed Les Films Séville, after a hostile merger with Industry Entertainment, and was acquired by Entertainment One in 2007. On May 31, 2000, Behaviour Worldwide was sold to MDP's old management, which changed its name back to MDP Worldwide.

In 2012, Les Films Séville merged with Alliance Vivafilm, which was acquired by Entertainment One, and the new entity kept the name Les Films Séville.

From April 2014, the distribution of films under the Alliance Vivafilm brand was stopped in favor of distribution solely under the Les Films Séville brand.

Entertainment One shut the division down in June 2022. Months later, distribution rights to its back catalogue for all media excluding physical media were acquired by Immina Films, a new independent company launched by former Séville president Patrick Roy.
