= Groulx (surname) =

Groulx is a surname.

== Persons ==
Notable people with the surname include:

- Benoit Groulx (Canadian football) (born 1985), Canadian football player
- Benoit Groulx (ice hockey) (born 1968), Canadian ice hockey player
- Benoit-Olivier Groulx (born 2000), French-born Canadian hockey player
- Danny Groulx (born 1981), Canadian hockey player
- Danny Groulx (Canadian football) (born 1990), Canadian football player
- Georges Groulx (1922–1997), Canadian actor
- Gilles Groulx (1931–1994), Canadian filmmaker
- Henri Groulx (1888–1952), Canadian pharmacist and politician
- Joseph Groulx (c. 1884–?), Franco-Ontarian storyteller
- Lionel Groulx (1878–1967), Canadian priest, historian and nationalist
  - Collège Lionel-Groulx, a college
  - Lionel-Groulx station, a station on the Montreal Metro
- Pierre Groulx (born 1975), Canadian hockey coach
- Sébastien Groulx (1974–2025), Canadian weightlifter
- Sylvie Groulx, Canadian filmmaker
- Teddy Groulx (1883–1936), Canadian hockey player
- Wayne Groulx (born 1965), Canadian-born Austrian hockey player
- Will Groulx (born 1974), American wheelchair rugby player

== See also ==
- Monts Groulx, a range of hills
- Groulx, an electoral district
