= Immina Films =

Canadian film distribution company

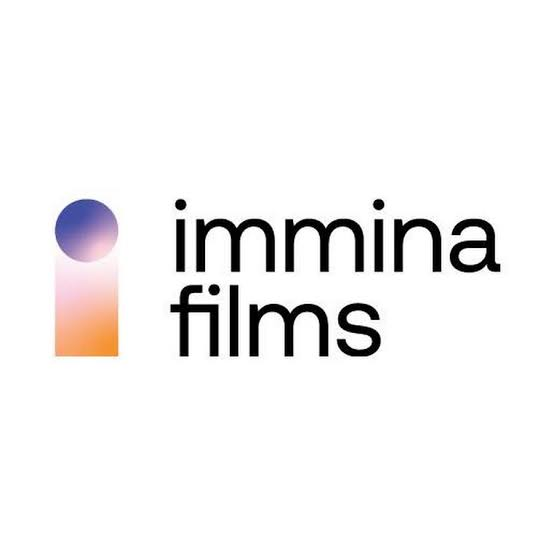
- Industry: Film
- Predecessor: Les Films Séville
- Founded: 2022
- Headquarters: Montreal, Quebec, Canada
- Key people: Patrick Roy
- Website: https://www.imminafilms.com/

Immina Films is a Canadian film distribution company launched in 2022.

The company was launched in 2022 by Patrick Roy, the former president of Les Films Séville, after the prior company was shut down in June by parent corporation Entertainment One. The closure of Séville had caused concern as the company had been one of the largest distributors of films in the Quebec market, leaving a large number of recent and historical Quebec films without a distributor; in November, Immina acquired Séville's back catalogue, as well as announcing Two Days Before Christmas (23 décembre) as its first new theatrical release.
