= Virginie Fortin =

Canadian actress and comedian

Virginie Fortin (born September 3, 1986) is a Canadian actress and comedian from Quebec.

== Comedy ==
She first became known as a comedian in the early 2010s, when she won the 2013 edition of the televised stand-up comedy competition En route vers mon premier gala Juste pour rire. In 2014 and 2015, she was a cast member of the sketch comedy series SNL Québec and Le nouveau show.

In the same era, she and Mariana Mazza undertook a comedy tour, Mazza-Fortin, 2 révélations, 1 incontournable, as a duo.

In 2018 she launched her first solo comedy tour, Du bruit dans le cosmos. She received a Félix Award nomination for Comedy Concert of the Year at the 41st Félix Awards in 2019.

Her second solo tour, Mes sentiments, was launched in 2022, garnering her a second Félix nomination for Comedy Concert of the Year at the 44th Félix Awards.

== Acting ==
She also had occasional small acting roles in scripted television series, until being cast in her first major role as Anaïs in the comedy series Trop in 2017.

She had her first film role in the 2022 film Two Days Before Christmas (23 décembre), for which she received a Prix Iris nomination for Revelation of the Year at the 25th Quebec Cinema Awards in 2023.

In 2026 she played Isabeau, the ghost, in Haunted (Hantée).
