= Escouade 99 =

2020 comedy television series

- Genre: Police procedural; Sitcom
- Based on: Brooklyn Nine-Nine by: Dan Goor; Michael Schur
- Developed by: Patrick Huard
- Written by: Benoît Pelletier
- Directed by: Patrick Huard (season 1); Patrice Ouimett (season 2)
- Starring: Mickaël Gouin; Widemir Normil; Mylène Mackay; Fayolle Jean Jr.
- Music by: Anik Jean
- Country of origin: Canada
- Original language: French
- No. of seasons: 2
- No. of episodes: 26

Production
- Production locations: Quebec City, Quebec
- Running time: 22 minutes
- Production companies: ComediHa!; Quebecor

Original release
- Network: Club Illico; TVA
- Release: September 17, 2020 – 2022

Escouade 99 (translation from French: Squad 99) is a Canadian French-language police procedural television sitcom, which premiered in 2020. Based on the American series Brooklyn Nine-Nine, the series was developed by Patrick Huard and written by Benoît Pelletier, with its first season being directed by Patrick Huard, and the second season by Patrice Ouimet.

It premiered on September 17, 2020, on the Club Illico streaming service.

== Cast ==
- Mickaël Gouin as Max Lemieux
- Widemir Normil as Raymond Célestin
- Mylène Mackay as Fanny Lizotte
- Fayolle Jean Jr. as Jeff Bourjoly
- Léane Labrèche-Dor as Valérie Ruel
- Guy Jodoin as Charles Lépine
- Bianca Gervais as Rosalie Boucher
- Louis Champagne as Goudreau
- Jean-Marc Dalphond as Ravary
- Olivier Martineau as Goudreault "The Vulture"
- Mehdi Bousaidan as The Pontiac Bandit

== Critical response ==
After the preview trailer premiered on the internet in August 2020, actress Melissa Fumero, who plays Amy Santiago in the original Brooklyn Nine-Nine, criticized the program for casting its versions of Amy Santiago and Rosa Diaz with actors of European ancestry rather than Latina actresses. According to Fumero, "while I understand the Latina population is [very] small in Quebec (& how many of them are funny actors?) the Amy and Rosa roles could've gone to ANY BIPOC so it's disappointing to see that missed opportunity." Talhí Briones, a Chilean Canadian writer and illustrator, also criticized the alleged whitewashing of Latina characters, as well as expressing concern about whether the series would retain Rosa Diaz's bisexuality.

Writing for Le Devoir, Justine Robidas also expressed concern about the show's cast, praising it for casting Haitian Canadian actors Widemir Normil and Fayolle Jean Jr. as its versions of Captain Holt and Terry Jeffords, but noting the absence of any significant characters representing Quebec's large Maghrebian, Asian or indigenous communities. She also asserted that the show was less an adaptation of Brooklyn Nine-Nine than a direct copy that missed much of what made the original show successful; other sources have also commented that numerous scenes in the trailer seemed to be shot-for-shot copies of scenes in the original series.

Conversely, Hugo Dumas of La Presse acknowledged the diversity issue, but wrote that in casting actors of African ancestry to portray the two main African American characters from the original, the show was already doing significantly better at representing cultural and racial diversity than most television series produced in Quebec. Normil has also confirmed that his character, Captain Raymond Célestin, retains Captain Holt's status as a gay man.

Writing for the Montréal Gazette, T'Cha Dunlevy covered the criticism by highlighting the stories of three Latina actresses working in Quebec (Ariane Castellanos, Sabrina Bégin-Tejeda and Ligia Borges), and their difficulties in getting cast for major non-Latina specific roles in Quebec film and television productions. The magazine Urbania also identified Castellanos, Roberta Arguello, Alice Pascual and Lesly Velasquez as Quebec-based Latina actresses who could have played the roles.

Huard subsequently stated that the casting was not done to intentionally "whitewash" the characters, and the show did cast Maghrebi actor and comedian Mehdi Bousaidan in the role of the Pontiac Bandit.
