= Colm Feore =

Canadian actor (born 1958)

Colm Feore OC
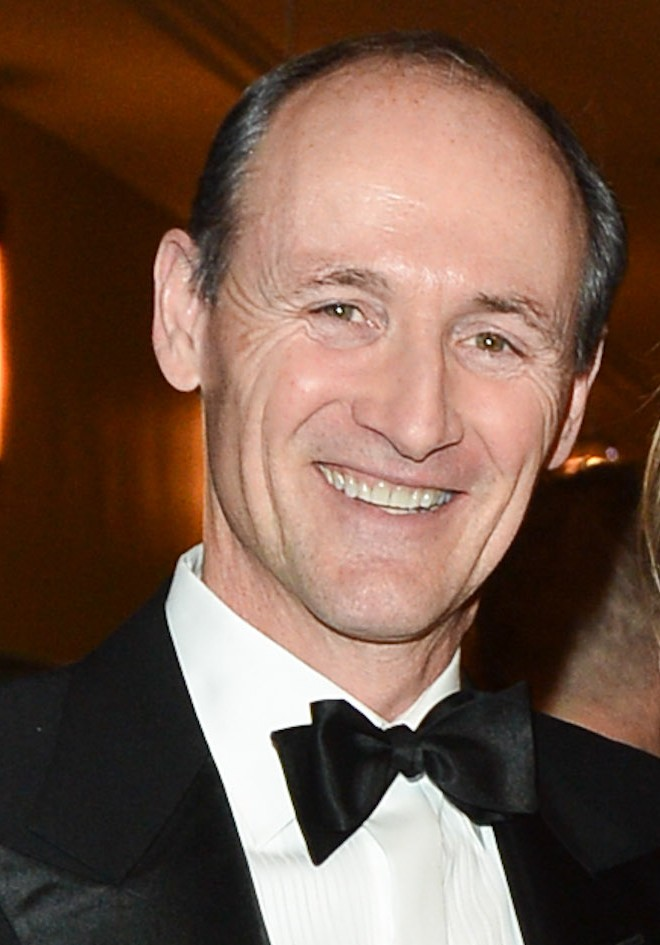
- Feore at the 2013 Canadian Film Centre annual gala and auction
- Born: Colm Joseph Feore; August 22, 1958 (age 68); Boston, Massachusetts, U.S.
- Citizenship: Canada; United States; Ireland
- Education: Ridley College , National Theatre School of Canada
- Occupation: Actor
- Years active: 1981–present
- Spouses: Sidonie Boll (m. 1984; div. 1994); Donna Starnes (m. 1994)
- Children: 3

Colm Joseph Feore OC (/ˈkɒləm ˈfjɔːr/; born August 22, 1958) is a Canadian actor. A 15-year veteran of the Stratford Festival, he is known in Canada for his Gemini-winning turn as Prime Minister Pierre Trudeau in the CBC miniseries Trudeau (2002), his portrayal of Glenn Gould in Thirty Two Short Films About Glenn Gould (1993), and for playing Detective Martin Ward in Bon Cop, Bad Cop (2006) and its sequel Bon Cop, Bad Cop 2 (2017).

Feore is known for his mainstream roles in film and on television. These include Dr. Malcolm Walsh in Face/Off (1997), Adm. Husband E. Kimmel in Pearl Harbor (2001), Martin Harrison in Chicago (2002), Olson in The Sum of All Fears (2002), Lord Marshal Zhylaw in The Chronicles of Riddick (2004), First Gentleman Henry Taylor on 24 (2009), Cardinal Della Rovere on The Borgias (2011–2013), Laufey in Thor (2011), Donald Menken in The Amazing Spider-Man 2 (2014), General Ted Brockhart on House of Cards (2016–2017), Declan Gallard on 21 Thunder (2017), Wernher von Braun in For All Mankind (2019), and Sir Reginald Hargreeves on The Umbrella Academy (2019–2024). Feore is also a Prix Iris and Screen Actors Guild Award winner and a Genie Award nominee.

== Early life and education ==
Feore was born in Boston, Massachusetts on August 22, 1958. His parents, Dr Dermot Feore and Sarah Dowling Feore, were Irish, and the family moved back to Ireland shortly after Colm was born, remaining there for several years before emigrating to Canada, landing in Ottawa in 1961 before moving to Windsor, Ontario. After graduating from Ridley College in St. Catharines, Ontario, he attended the National Theatre School of Canada in Montreal, Quebec.

== Career ==
Feore honed his acting skills as a member of the Acting Company of the Stratford Festival of Canada, North America's largest classical repertory theatre. He spent 17 seasons at Stratford where he rose from bit parts to leading roles, including Romeo, Hamlet, Richard III, and Cyrano. He returned in 2006 to star in four productions, including Don Juan in both English and French and as Fagin in Oliver! In 2009 he played the main role of Macbeth in the play Macbeth, the main role of Cyrano in Cyrano de Bergerac, and Lear in King Lear in 2014, all performed at the Stratford Festival Theatre. He also has appeared on Broadway as Cassius in the production of Julius Caesar starring Denzel Washington as Brutus. Off-Broadway, for the Public Theater, he was Claudius in a Hamlet production that starred Liev Schreiber.

In Canada, Feore's most famous roles were as Prime Minister Pierre Trudeau in the critically acclaimed television mini-series Trudeau, a role for which he won a Gemini Award for Best Performance by an Actor in a Leading Role in a Dramatic Program or Mini-Series, as classical pianist Glenn Gould in the 1993 film Thirty-Two Short Films About Glenn Gould, and as by-the-book English Canadian detective Martin Ward in the box-office hit Bon Cop, Bad Cop. He also played a crazed marketing executive imposter in the second season of the Canadian TV series, Slings and Arrows, a role that continued for several episodes. The show has run in the United States on the Sundance Channel.

Outside Canada, Feore has appeared in numerous film, theatre and television roles. He is perhaps most famous in the United States for his supporting roles in such Hollywood films as Chicago, City of Angels, Pearl Harbor, The Sum of All Fears, Paycheck, and The Chronicles of Riddick. In 1999, he appeared in Stephen King's Storm of the Century as the powerful ancient wizard Andre Linoge. He was the crooked Los Angeles Police Chief James E. Davis in 2008's Changeling. In 2011, he appeared as Laufey, King of the Frost Giants, in the live-action superhero film Thor. In 2014, he portrayed Dr. Francis Dulmacher in Gotham. He portrayed the First Gentleman Henry Taylor on the seventh season of 24, appeared as Tad Whitney in The West Wing second-season episode titled "Galileo", and played the billionaire suspect Jordan Hayes in the episode for Law & Order: Special Victims Unit "Flight". He played supernatural murderers in two episodes of Friday the 13th: The Series.

== Honours ==
On June 8, 2002, Feore received an honorary Doctor of Humanities degree (D.Hum.) from the University of Windsor in Windsor. In October 2012, he was awarded an honorary Doctor of Letters degree (D.Litt.) by Wilfrid Laurier University in Waterloo, Ontario, in recognition of his contributions to Canadian theatre and film.

Feore was honoured with Gascon-Thomas Award from the National Theatre School of Canada in 2013, the award is given annually to an actor that makes an exceptional contribution to the growth of theatre. In the same year, he was made an Officer of the Order of Canada (OC) "for his contributions as an actor of the stage and screen, notably by bridging Anglophone and Francophone cultures as a fluently bilingual performer."

In 2019, Feore received the Lifetime Artistic Achievement Award in Film from the Governor General's Performing Arts Awards. He won the Canadian Screen Award for Best Supporting Actor at the 9th Canadian Screen Awards in 2021, for the film Sugar Daddy.

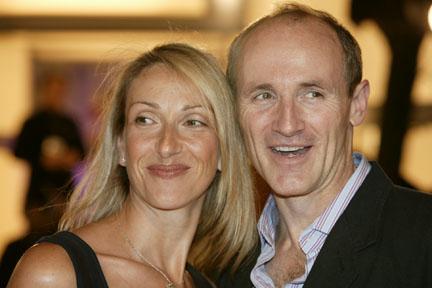
Colm and Donna Feore at TIFF 2007

== Personal life ==
Feore has been married to Donna Feore (née Starnes), a choreographer and theatre director associated with the National Arts Centre and the Stratford Festival, since 1994. He was previously married to actress Sidonie Boll, whom he met at the National Theatre School, from 1983 to 1994. Feore has three children: son Jack with Boll, and son Thomas and daughter Anna with Donna Feore.

Feore is fluent in French.

== Filmography ==
=== Film ===
| Year | Title | Role | Notes |
|---|---|---|---|
| 1988 | Iron Eagle II | Lieutenant Yuri Lebanov | |
| 1990 | Beautiful Dreamers | Dr. Maurice Bucke | |
| 1990 | Bethune: The Making of a Hero | Chester Rice | |
| 1993 | Thirty Two Short Films About Glenn Gould | Glenn Gould | |
| 1996 | The Boor | Gruzdev | Short film |
| 1997 | Night Falls on Manhattan | Elihu Harrison | |
| 1997 | Face/Off | Dr. Malcolm Walsh | |
| 1997 | The Wrong Guy | The Killer | |
| 1997 | Critical Care | Richard Wilson | |
| 1998 | City of Angels | Dr. Jordan | |
| 1998 | The Red Violin | Auctioneer | |
| 1998 | Airborne | Ron Simpson | |
| 1998 | The Lesser Evil | Derek | |
| 1998 | The Herd | Erling Porsild | |
| 1999 | Striking Poses | Linus | |
| 1999 | The Insider | Richard Scruggs | |
| 1999 | Titus | Marcus Andronicus | |
| 2000 | Thomas and the Magic Railroad | Toby the Tram Engine (voice) | |
| 2000 | The Perfect Son | Ryan Taylor | |
| 2001 | Ignition | General Joel MacAteer | |
| 2001 | The Caveman's Valentine | David Leppenraub | |
| 2001 | Pearl Harbor | Admiral Husband E. Kimmel | |
| 2001 | Century Hotel | Sebastian | |
| 2001 | Lola | Mike | |
| 2002 | The Sum of All Fears | Olson | |
| 2002 | Point of Origin | Mike Matassa | |
| 2002 | The Baroness and the Pig | The Baron | |
| 2002 | Chicago | Martin Harrison | |
| 2003 | Highwaymen | Fargo | |
| 2003 | National Security | Detective Frank McDuff | |
| 2003 | Paycheck | John Wolfe | |
| 2004 | The Chronicles of Riddick | Lord Marshal Zhylaw | |
| 2005 | Lies My Mother Told Me | Lucas Mackenzie | |
| 2005 | The Deal | Hank Weiss | |
| 2005 | Heidi | Mr. Sesseman (voice) | |
| 2005 | The Exorcism of Emily Rose | Karl Gunderson | |
| 2006 | Bon Cop, Bad Cop | Detective Martin Ward | |
| 2007 | The Poet | Colonel Hass | |
| 2007 | Intervention | Bill | |
| 2007 | Killing Zelda Sparks | Dr. Leningrad | |
| 2008 | Waitresses Wanted | RCMP Corporal Paradis | |
| 2008 | The American Trap | Maurice Bishop | |
| 2008 | Changeling | Chief James E. Davis | |
| 2008 | Inconceivable | Dr. Jackson Charles Freeman | |
| 2008 | Six Reasons Why | The Preacher | |
| 2008 | WarGames: The Dead Code | T. Kenneth Hassert / Joshua (voice) | |
| 2009 | The Trotsky | Principal Berkhoff | |
| 2010 | Voodoo | The Narrator | Short film |
| 2010 | Interregnum | King Ubu / Klaus | Short film |
| 2011 | Thor | Laufey | |
| 2011 | French Immersion | Michael Pontifikator | |
| 2014 | Jack Ryan: Shadow Recruit | Rob Behringer | |
| 2014 | The Amazing Spider-Man 2 | Donald Menken | |
| 2014 | Elephant Song | Lawrence | |
| 2015 | King Lear | King Lear | |
| 2015 | Reversion | Jack Clé | |
| 2015 | Painkillers | Dr. Troutman | |
| 2016 | Mean Dreams | The Chief | |
| 2017 | Bon Cop, Bad Cop 2 | Martin Ward | |
| 2017 | The Curse of Buckout Road | Reverend Mike Reagan | |
| 2018 | Greta | Chris McCullen | |
| 2018 | Anon | Charles Gattis | |
| 2018 | Higher Power | Control | |
| 2019 | The Prodigy | Arthur Jacobson | |
| 2019 | Astronaut | Marcus | |
| 2020 | My Salinger Year | Daniel | |
| 2020 | Sugar Daddy | Gordon | |
| 2021 | Trigger Point | Elias Kane | |
| 2021 | My Soul to Take | Fred | Short film |
| 2023 | My Mother's Men (Les Hommes de ma mère) | Neal | |
| 2025 | The Girl Who Cried Pearls (La jeune fille qui pleurait des perles) | The Narrator | |

=== Television ===
| Year | Title | Role | Notes |
|---|---|---|---|
| 1981 | The Running Man | Rick | Television film |
| 1982 | The Great Detective | Talbot | Episode: "Death Circuit" |
| 1987 | Blades of Courage | Bruce Gainor | Television film |
| 1987 | A Nest of Singing Birds | Michael Jimson | Television film |
| 1989–1990 | Friday the 13th: The Series | Alex Dent / Anton Pascola | 2 episodes |
| 1989–1990 | War of the Worlds | Nikita / Leonid Argochev | 2 episodes |
| 1991 | Heritage Minutes | Colonel; John McCrae | Episode: "John McCrae" |
| 1992 | Street Legal | Kyle Thompson | Episode: "November" |
| 1992–1993 | Beyond Reality | Mason Driscoll / Sorcerer (voice) | 2 episodes |
| 1993 | Romeo & Juliet | Mercutio | Television film |
| 1993 | Dig & Dug with Daisy | The Narrator (voice) | Canadian dub only |
| 1995 | Forever Knight | Walken | Episode: "Blood Money" |
| 1995 | Friends at Last | Phillip Connelyn | Television film |
| 1995 | Truman | Charles Griffith Ross | Television film |
| 1995 | Where's the Money, Noreen? | Kevin Hanover | Television film |
| 1995–1996 | Kung Fu: The Legend Continues | Selinger | 2 episodes |
| 1996 | Due South | Charles Carver | Episode: "The Duel" |
| 1996 | The Outer Limits | Major Mackie | Episode: "The Heist" |
| 1997 | Night Sins | Deacon Albert Fletcher | Television film |
| 1997 | Liberty! The American Revolution | Alexander Hamilton | Miniseries |
| 1997 | Hostile Waters | Pshenishny | Television film |
| 1998 | The Escape | Hickman | Television film |
| 1998 | Creature | Admiral Aaron Richland | Miniseries |
| 1998–2000 | La Femme Nikita | Leon / Brutus (voices) | 2 episodes |
| 1999 | Storm of the Century | Andre Linoge | Miniseries |
| 2000 | Trapped in a Purple Haze | Ed Hanson | Television film |
| 2000 | The West Wing | Tad Whitney | Episode: "Galileo" |
| 2000 | Boston Public | George Guber | Episode: "Chapter Seven" |
| 2000 | Nuremberg | Rudolf Hoess | Television film |
| 2001 | Foreign Objects | Tibor | 5 episodes |
| 2001 | Haven | Bruno | Television film |
| 2001 | Final Jeopardy | Paul Battaglia | Television film |
| 2001 | The Day Reagan Was Shot | Caspar Weinberger | Television film |
| 2002 | Benjamin Franklin | The Narrator (voice) | Miniseries |
| 2002 | Sins of the Father | Dalton Strong | Television film |
| 2002 | Trudeau | Pierre Trudeau | Television film |
| 2002 | Widows | Stein | Miniseries |
| 2002 | Point of Origin | Mike Matassa | Television film |
| 2003 | And Starring Pancho Villa as Himself | D.W. Griffith | Television film |
| 2004 | The Newsroom | David | Episode: "Reality Strikes" |
| 2004 | The Eleventh Hour | Owen Sawyer | Episode: "Eden" |
| 2005 | Lies My Mother Told Me | Lucas Mackenzie | Television film |
| 2005 | Empire | Julius Caesar | 3 episodes |
| 2005 | Slings & Arrows | Sanjay | 5 episodes |
| 2005 | Burnt Toast | Dave | Television film |
| 2006 | Secret Files of the Inquisition | The Narrator | Miniseries |
| 2006 | Battlestar Galactica | President Richard Adar | Episode: "Epiphanies" |
| 2007 | Bury My Heart at Wounded Knee | General William Tecumseh Sherman | Television film |
| 2007 | American Experience | The Narrator | Episode: "Alexander Hamilton" |
| 2008 | 24: Redemption | First Gentleman Henry Taylor | Television film |
| 2008 | Guns | Paul Duguid | Miniseries |
| 2009 | Flashpoint | David Graham | Episode: "Eagle Two" |
| 2009 | 24 | Henry Taylor | 12 episodes |
| 2009 | The Listener | Ray Mercer | 7 episodes |
| 2011 | Law & Order: Special Victims Unit | Jordan Hayes | Episode: "Flight" |
| 2011–2013 | The Borgias | Giuliano della Rovere | 20 episodes |
| 2012 | Saving Hope | Mac | Episodes: "The Great Randall", "Bea, Again" |
| 2012–2013 | Revolution | Randall Flynn | 9 episodes |
| 2013 | The Good Wife | Brad Lund | Episode: "Red Team, Blue Team" |
| 2013 | House of Versace | Santo Versace | Television film |
| 2014 | Beauty & the Beast | Frank Darnell | Episode: "Recipe for Disaster" |
| 2014–2016 | Sensitive Skin | Roger | 7 episodes |
| 2015 | Pirate's Passage | Corporal Robin Hawkins (voice) | Television film |
| 2015 | Gotham | Dr. Francis Dulmacher | 2 episodes |
| 2016–2017 | House of Cards | Ted Brockhart | 12 episodes |
| 2017 | Lore | Dr. Walter Freeman | Episode: "Echoes" |
| 2018 | The Truth About the Harry Quebert Affair | Elijah Stern | 5 episodes |
| 2019–2024 | The Umbrella Academy | Sir Reginald Hargreeves / The Monocle | Main cast |
| 2019; 2024 | Murdoch Mysteries | George Crabtree Sr. | Episodes: "Prodigal Father" & "Train to Nowhere" |
| 2019 | For All Mankind | Wernher von Braun | 3 episodes |
| 2020 | Project Blue Book | Admiral | Episode: "Operation Mainbrace" |
| 2024 | Landman | Nathan | Recurring cast |

== Stratford Festival Theatre credits ==
- Romeo and Juliet (1984), Romeo
- The Boys from Syracuse (1986), Antipholus
- Cymbeline (1986), Iachimo
- The Winter's Tale (1986), Leontes
- Othello (1987), Iago
- The Cherry Orchard (1987), Yasha
- Richard III (1988), King Richard III
- The Taming of the Shrew (1988), Petruchio
- The Three Musketeers (1988), Athos
- Julius Caesar (1990), Cassius
- The Merry Wives of Windsor (1990), Frank Ford
- Hamlet (1991), Hamlet
- Much Ado About Nothing (1991), Benedick
- Romeo and Juliet (1992), Mercutio
- Measure for Measure (1992), Angelo
- A Midsummer Night's Dream (1993), Oberon
- The Pirates of Penzance (1994), Pirate King
- Cyrano de Bergerac (1994), Cyrano
- My Fair Lady (2002), Henry Higgins
- Don Juan (2006), Don Juan
- Oliver! (2006), Fagin
- Coriolanus (2006), Coriolanus
- Intervention (2007)
- Macbeth (2009), Macbeth
- Cyrano de Bergerac (2009), Cyrano
- King Lear (2014), King Lear
- The Beaux' Stratagem (2014), Archer
- Richard III (2022), Richard III
- The Miser (2022), Harper
