= Miryam Bouchard =

Canadian filmmaker and screenwriter

Miryam Bouchard is a Canadian film director and screenwriter from Quebec, whose debut feature film My Very Own Circus (Mon cirque à moi) was released in 2020.

The daughter of a circus performer, she directed a number of short films and television episodes before releasing My Very Own Circus in 2020. In 2019, she won a Gémeaux Award for Best Direction in a Comedy Series for her work on Can You Hear Me? (M'entends tu?)

In 2022 she was co-director with Catherine Chabot of Lines of Escape (Lignes de fuite), and directed the romantic comedy film Two Days Before Christmas (23 décembre).
