= Patrick Huard =

Canadian actor, writer and comedian

- Born: January 2, 1969 (age 57); Montreal, Quebec, Canada
- Occupations: Actor, comedian
- Years active: 1997–present
- Spouse(s): Lynda Lemay (div.); Anik Jean (m. 2011)
- Children: 2

Patrick Huard (born January 2, 1969) is a Canadian actor, writer and comedian from Quebec.

== Career ==
Huard broke into the Quebec show business scene in 1989 as a comedian, actor and television personality, with success as a stand-up comedian in the early 1990s. He had his first film role in the 1997 film Heads or Tails (J’en suis!), attaining greater success the following year with a recurring role as a hockey player in the Les Boys franchise.

With François Flamand, he launched the theatre troupe Le Nouveau Theatre Insolite, which debuted with a French-language adaptation of Eric Bogosian's Talk Radio in 1997, with Huard in the lead role.

He cemented his credentials as the co-star and co-writer of Bon Cop, Bad Cop, now the most successful domestic film at the box office in the history of Canadian cinema.

In 2007 he made his debut as a director with The 3 L'il Pigs (Les 3 P’tits cochons), which was a hit in Quebec and won the Golden Reel Award for the top-grossing Canadian film of the year. He followed up in 2010 with File 13 (Filière 13), and has also directed short films and episodes of the television series Taxi 0-22 and Escouade 99.

In 2020 he launched a talk show, La Tour, on TVA. He hosted the show for two seasons until leaving in 2022.

In 2023 he hosted LOL: Qui rira le dernier?, the Quebec adaptation of the international Documental franchise.

In 2024, he was named the recipient of the Earle Grey Award, the Academy of Canadian Cinema and Television's lifetime achievement award for acting, at the 12th Canadian Screen Awards.

== Personal life ==
He was married to singer Lynda Lemay in the 1990s, having one daughter with her before their divorce.

He remarried in 2011 to singer Anik Jean. Their son, Nathan Jean-Huard, had an acting role in his mother's directorial debut film My Mother's Men (Les Hommes de ma mère) in 2023.

== Filmography ==
=== Feature films ===
- 1997: Heads or Tails (J’en suis!)
- 1997: Les Boys – T-Guy
- 1998: Les Boys II
- 2000: Life After Love (La vie après l’amour)
- 2000: Stardom – Montreal Talk-Show Host
- 2001: Les Boys III
- 2003: How My Mother Gave Birth to Me During Menopause (Comment ma mère accoucha de moi durant sa ménopause)
- 2003: Red Nose (Nez rouge)
- 2003: Evil Words (Sur le seuil)
- 2004: Machine Gun Molly (Monica la mitraille)
- 2005: Maman Last Call
- 2006: Bon Cop, Bad Cop – David Bouchard
- 2007: The 3 L'il Pigs (Les 3 p'tits cochons)
- 2009: Cadavres
- 2010: Funkytown – Bastien Lavallée
- 2011: Starbuck – David Wozniak
- 2012: Le Projet Omerta – Steve Bélanger
- 2014: Mommy - Paul Béliveau
- 2015: Ego Trip - Marc Morin
- 2015: My Internship in Canada - Steve Guibord
- 2017: Bon Cop, Bad Cop 2 - David Bouchard
- 2020: My Very Own Circus (Mon cirque à moi) - Bill
- 2023: My Mother's Men (Les Hommes de ma mère) - Paul

=== Television ===
- 1993-1994: Là tu parles
- 1998: Réseaux
- 2006: Au nom de la loi
- 2006: Cover Girl
- 2006: Le Cœur a ses raisons
- 2006: Music Hall
- 2007: Taxi 0-22
- 2023: LOL: Qui rira le dernier?
- 2026: Bon Cop, Bad Cop

== Awards and accolades ==
Award	Year	Category	Work	Result	Ref
Canadian Comedy Awards	2007	Best Performance by a Male in a Film	Bon Cop, Bad Cop with Leila Basen, Alex Epstein, Kevin Tierney	Won	
Canadian Comedy Awards	2007	Best Writing in a Film	Bon Cop, Bad Cop with Leila Basen, Alex Epstein, Kevin Tierney	Won	
Genie Awards; Canadian Screen Awards	2001	Best Supporting Actor	Life After Love (La Vie après l'amour)	Nominated	
Genie Awards; Canadian Screen Awards	2007	Best Actor	Bon Cop, Bad Cop	Nominated	
Genie Awards; Canadian Screen Awards	2012	Best Actor	Starbuck	Nominated	
Genie Awards; Canadian Screen Awards	2024	Earle Grey Award		Won	
Prix Jutra/Iris	2001	Best Supporting Actor	Life After Love (La Vie après l'amour)	Nominated	
Prix Jutra/Iris	2002	Best Actor	Les Boys III	Nominated	
Prix Jutra/Iris	2007	Best Actor	Bon Cop, Bad Cop	Nominated	
Prix Jutra/Iris	2007	Best Screenplay with Leila Basen, Alex Epstein, Kevin Tierney	Bon Cop, Bad Cop	Nominated	
Prix Jutra/Iris	2008	Billet d'or	The 3 L'il Pigs (Les 3 p'tits cochons)	Won	
Prix Jutra/Iris	2009	Most Successful Film Outside Quebec	The 3 L'il Pigs (Les 3 p'tits cochons)	Nominated	
Prix Jutra/Iris	2012	Best Actor	Starbuck	Nominated	
Prix Jutra/Iris	2018	Best Actor	Bon Cop, Bad Cop 2	Nominated	
Prix Jutra/Iris	2018	Public Prize	Bon Cop Bad Cop 2 with Alain DesRochers, Pierre Even, François Flamand	Nominated	
Prix Jutra/Iris	2023	Public Prize	My Mother's Men (Les hommes de ma mère) with Patrick Roy, Anik Jean, Maryse Latendresse	Won	
Vancouver Film Critics Circle	2011	Best Actor in a Canadian Film	Starbuck	Nominated	
Vancouver Film Critics Circle	2015	Best Supporting Actor in a Canadian Film	My Internship in Canada (Guibord s'en va-t-en guerre)	Nominated	
Governor General's Performing Arts Award	2025	Film and television lifetime achievement		Won	
