= Fanny (2025 film) =

2025 Canadian drama film

- Directed by: Yan England
- Written by: Stéphanie Lapointe
- Produced by: Annie Blais; Claude Veillet; Lucie Veillet
- Starring: Milya Corbeil Gauvreau; Éric Bruneau; Adelaïde Schoofs; Léokim Beaumier-Lépine; Magalie Lépine-Blondeau; Claude Legault
- Cinematography: Jérôme Sabourin
- Edited by: Benjamin Duffield
- Music by: Raphaêl Reed
- Production company: Téléfiction Distribution
- Release date: May 9, 2025
- Running time: 114 minutes
- Country: Canada
- Language: French

Fanny is a drama directed by Yan England, based on the young adult novels Fanny Cloutier by French-Canadian writer Stéphanie Lapointe, who also wrote the screenplay. It is the director's third feature film, following 1:54 and Sam.

In this story of a Montreal teenager searching for the circumstances surrounding her mother's death, the film explores themes such as family ties, friendship, self-confidence, and the weight of grief.

Shot in Quebec and Japan in 2024, it has been released in theaters on May 9, 2025. The film had its international premiere at the Angoulême Francophone Film Festival on August 25, 2025 in competition.

== Content ==
After her mom's death, Fanny lives with her grief-stricken academic father. When a family secret emerges, she desperately searches for the truth about her mother's death.

== Cast ==
- Milya Corbeil Gauvreau (Fanny Cloutier)
- Éric Bruneau (Hubert Cloutier)
- Claude Legault (Nicolas Birgman)
- Magalie Lépine-Blondeau (Lorette)
- Adelaïde Schoofs (Léonie)
- Léokim Beaumier-Lépine (Henri)
- Hubert Proulx (Andre)
- Marilyse Bourke (Sylvie)
- Tanya Brideau (Marianne)
- Zaomei Léveillé Ferraiolo (Fanny, 4 yrs old)
