= Louis Cyr =

Canadian strongman (1863-1912)

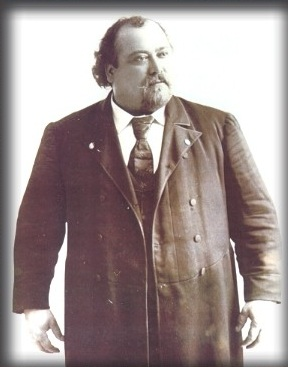
- Cyr c. 1890s
- Born: Cyprien - Noé Cyr; October 10, 1863; Saint-Cyprien-de-Napierville, Canada East
- Died: November 10, 1912 (aged 49); Montreal, Quebec, Canada
- Other name: Canadian Samson
- Predecessor: Emiliana Cyr, Helene Perron, Alyssa and Loriane
- Sports career
- Height: 1.74 m (5 ft 8 1/2 in)
- Weight: 127–154 kg (280–340 lb)
- Parents: Pierre Cyr (father); Philomène Berger Cyr (mother)
- Sport: Strongman

Louis Cyr (French pronunciation: [lwi siʁ]; born Cyprien-Noé Cyr; October 10, 1863 – November 10, 1912) was a Canadian strongman. In his career spanning the late 19th and early 20th centuries he performed feats of strength such as lifting 500 pounds (227 kg) with one finger and backlifting 4,337 pounds (1,967 kg), which inspired former International Fitness and Bodybuilding Federation chairman Ben Weider to declare in 2000 that Cyr is the strongest man ever.

Since his strength was so far above and beyond the ordinary during his time, he and his contemporary Louis 'Apollon' Uni were collectively called the 'Kings of Strength'.

== Early years ==
Cyr was born in Saint-Cyprien-de-Napierville, Canada East. Coming from a French-Canadian family, he began developing his extraordinary strength at an early age. From the age of twelve Cyr worked in a lumber camp during the winters and on the family's farm the rest of the year. Discovering his exceptional strength at a very young age, he impressed his fellow workers with his feats of strength. After learning of the tale, Cyr attempted to mimic the practice of legendary strongman Milo of Croton, who as a child carried a calf on his shoulders, continuing to carry it as it grew into a full-grown bull and he into a grown man. Cyr's calf, however, bolted one day, kicking him in his back, after which he instead began carrying a sack of grain 1/4 mile (0.40 km) every day, adding 2 pounds (0.91 kg) each day. According to one of his biographers, his mother decided "He should let his hair grow, like Samson in the Bible". She curled it regularly.

Louis started his strong man career at the age of 17, after some publicity came about due to an incident when the young Louis was reported to have lifted a farmer's heavily laden wagon out of the mire in which it had become stuck. He was matched in a contest against Michaud of Quebec, who was recognized as Canada's strongest man of the time. Cyr beat him in tests of lifting of heavy stones by hoisting a granite boulder weighing 480 lb (220 kg).

In 1878, the Cyr family immigrated to Lowell, Massachusetts in the United States. In Lowell, Cyr changed his name from Cyprien-Noé to Louis, as it was easier to pronounce in English. Again, his great strength brought him fame. At 17 years old, he weighed 230 pounds (104 kg). He entered his first strongman contest in Boston at age 22, lifting a horse off the ground. The fully grown male horse was placed on a platform with two iron bars attached, which enabled Cyr to obtain a better grip. The horse weighed at least 3/4 short ton (0.68 t).

== Rise to fame ==
In 1882, while working as a logger, Louis married Melina Comtois. The following year he and his wife returned to Lowell, hoping to capitalize on his fame there. A tour of the Maritimes was organized, and while it may have benefited the organizer, Cyr gained no profit financially. He then began touring Quebec with his family in a show they called "The Troupe Cyr".

He was urged by friends to enter the world of professional strong men, lifting mainly crude solid or shot-filled weights.

From 1883 to 1885, Cyr served as a police officer in Montreal, Quebec. Following this, he went on tour with a troupe that included a wrestler, a boxer, and a weightlifter. He entered a strongman competition in March 1886, in Quebec City, against the reigning Canadian strongman, David Michaud. Cyr lifted a 218-pound (99 kg) barbell with one hand (to Michaud's 158 pounds or 72 kg) and a weight of 2,371 pounds (1,075 kg) on his back, to his opponent's 2,071 pounds (939 kg) to win the title of strongest man in the country.

With little reward at this early foray into professional weightlifting, Louis was forced to seek other employment. Cyr became a police officer after breaking up a knife fight and carrying both participants to the police station.

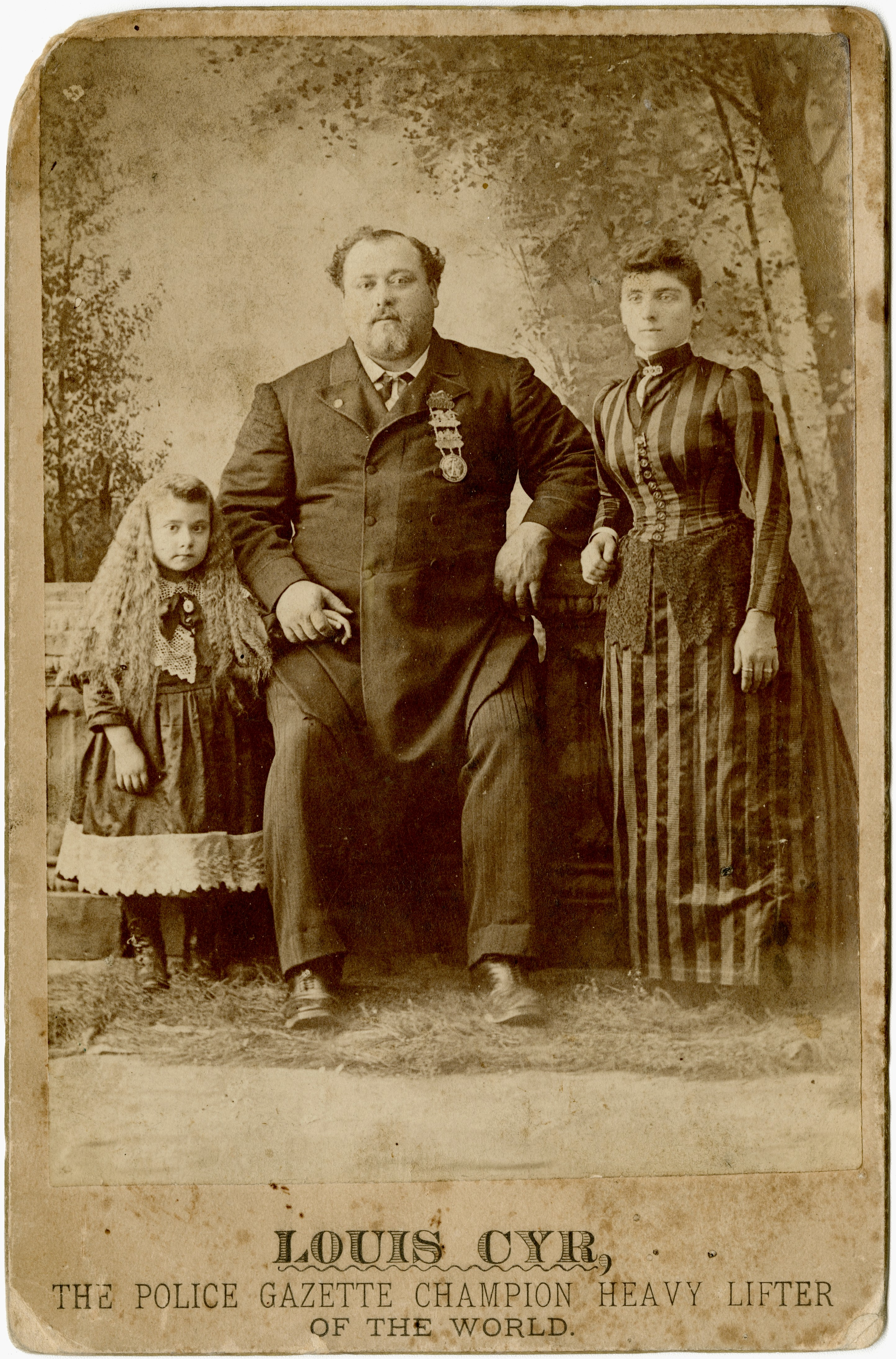
Louis Cyr with wife Mélina Courtois and daughter Émiliana Cyr in 1899

Prudent with his earnings, Louis left the police force and purchased a tavern/restaurant in St. Cunégonde, where he also featured a gymnasium that became a mecca for strength athletes and fighters. Cyr was well acquainted with John L. Sullivan, being one of the few to defy Sullivan's commands to drink when he drank. Sullivan was known as The Boston Strong Boy and was very powerful, but not in Cyr's class. Cyr, happy in his own environment, beat all comers when challenged to perform. His daughter was born in 1887 and died in 1935

Cyr's exploits were reported in publications such as the 'Pink Un' and the Police Gazette, published by Richard K. Fox, a promoter of strength athletes including Travis and Eugen Sandow. Fox offered a prize of $5,000 to anyone who could defeat Cyr in his strength feats. Promoted by Fox, Louis won a contest in 1885-1891, defeating competitors such as Sebastian Miller, Bienkowski, Cyclops, August Johnson, and Richard Pennell. Eugen Sandow was also among those who attempted to challenge Cyr, and a diamond-studded belt was to be awarded to the winner if such an event took place. Sandow did not pursue further challenges later in his career, following earlier defeats, including one against McCann.

There was no doubt that Cyr was an unusual man regarding size and measurements, the latter often causing debate. Although Dr. Dudley A. Sargent, famous Harvard University physical director recorded measuring Cyr in 1895 when Cyr was 32 years old and weighed 291 lb (132 kg). Sargent listed Cyr's height as 5'8.5". Other measurements, most on the conservative side as compared to other biographers, were neck – 20 inches (51 cm), biceps – 20 inches (51 cm), forearms – 16.3 inches (41 cm), wrists – 8.2 inches (21 cm), chest (normal) – 55.2 inches (140 cm), chest expanded – 60 inches (150 cm), waist - 47.4 inches (120 cm), hips – 48.1 inches (122 cm), thighs – 28.5 inches (72 cm), knees – 17", and calves - 19.3 inches (49 cm), far short of the quoted 28", but perhaps a possible 23" later when of higher body weight. Ankle 10.3 inches (26 cm) and Shoulder width with calipers ... across the deltoids 25.6 inches (65 cm). The above details were just one set of figures relating to Cyr's size, others being recorded by Willoughby when for example Cyr was 47 years old (in 1910) gave him calf 23", neck 22 3/4", biceps 21 1/2". chest normal 59 1/2" and thighs 33" with other parts to match the increase in weight, being at the time a heavier 365 lbs. Ben Weider, who was privileged to access family archives, was even more generous giving arm size 24 inches (61 cm), forearms 19 inches (48 cm), and calves, the disputed 28 inches (71 cm), following a similar line to Jowett.

== Reputation as a Strongman ==
While several of Cyr's feats of strength may have been exaggerated over the years, some were documented and remain impressive. These included:

- lifting a platform on his back holding 18 men for a total of 4,336-pound (1,967 kg)
- lifting a 534-pound (242 kg) weight with one finger
- pushing a freight car up an incline
- At 19 years old, he lifted a rock from ground up to his shoulder, officially weighted at 514 pounds
- He beat Eugen Sandow's bent press record (and therefore the heaviest weight lifted with one hand) by 2 pounds (0.91 kg) to a total of 273 pounds (124 kg).

=== Backlift ===
Perhaps his greatest feat occurred in 1895, when he was reported to have lifted 4,337 pounds (1,967 kg) on his back in Boston by putting 18 men on a platform and lifting them. One of his most memorable displays of strength occurred in Montreal on 12 October 1891. Louis resisted the pull of four draught horses (two in each hand) as grooms stood cracking their whips to get the horses to pull harder, a feat he again demonstrated in Ottawa with Queen Victoria's team of draught horses . While in Ottawa he volunteered with the police when they took deputies to round up a local gang of miscreants; they turned him away claiming he would be too slow due to his bulk. He challenged the regular officers to a foot race, beating the majority, and they took him on.

He patrolled as a police officer between 1883 and 1885 in Sainte-Cunégonde, known now as Petite-Bourgogne (Little Burgundy) in Montreal. Both the Parc Louis-Cyr and the Place des Hommes-Forts ("Strongmen's Square") are named after him. Statues of him are located at Place des Hommes-Forts and the Musée de la Civilisation in Quebec City. The high school in his hometown of Napierville is also named after him.

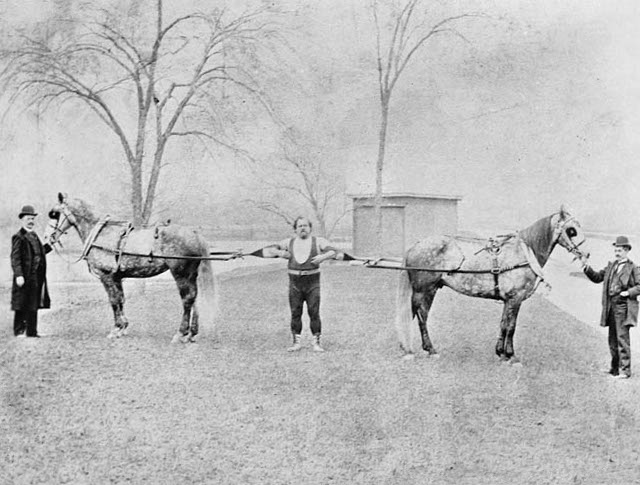
Louis Cyr ready to restrain horses, 1891

Through no fault of his own, many of Cyr's lifts, like his measurements, have been exaggerated or misquoted. In particular, his celebrated back lift done in Boston, of 18 men on a platform, is usually generously estimated at 4,300 lb, which allowing for a very heavy platform of at most 500 lb, meant that each man on average would have weighed approximately 211 lb.

=== Cyr dumbbell ===
Cyr was also credited with side pressing 273 lb (124 kg) with one arm (the right), a lift witnessed by Britain's great champion Tom Pevier, who described it more like a 'jerk press.' The dumbbell, a huge thick-handled one, was lifted to the shoulders with two hands, before the single-handed overhead move. Cyr's dumbbells were often so unwieldy that many respectable strongmen were unable to lift them off the floor, let alone lift them overhead.

One particular dumbbell of Cyr's weighed, when empty, 202 lb (92 kg). It was the same bell that had defeated a drove of former strength athletes, and it was exchanged by its owner, 280 lb. police chief Joseph Moquin of Quebec (who could and did bent press the weight) for a modern set of York weights. Thus, it came into the possession of the late Bob Hoffman and Mike Dietz. According to Strength & Health magazine, Hoffman, after several attempts, was able to bent press it, as did the much lighter 150 lb. Sig Klein. John Grimek later also bent pressed it, half a dozen times or so one afternoon, when the weight was increased to 269.5 lb, by adding, as it happened, the lead type from Mark Berrys' classic tome Physical Training Simplified. Hence the reason the book was never reprinted.

As a master of the trenches, Cyr was known for his appetite, reportedly consuming over four times the average portion. He was said to have been able to eat up to six pounds of meat in a meal. His typical contest weight was around 320 pounds, although his lightest recorded weight occurred during a competition against August Johnson was 270 pounds. In contrast, his wife, Melina never exceeded 100 pounds.

In 1886, Cyr met and defeated Richard Pennell, who was then 40, and Louis just 23. On 1 October 1888 at Berthierville, Quebec, he lifted 3,536 lb/ 1,604 kg of pig iron for his first record in the back lift.

=== Horse resisting ===
On 1 December 1891 at Sohmer Park in Montreal, before some 10,000 people, Cyr resisted the pull of four draught horses, two on each side, despite grooms cracking their whips to encourage the horses to pull harder and strain their haunches.

In January 1892, Cyr embarked in England with partner Horace Barré, arousing much interest and curiosity at his London debut at the Royal Aquarium, with 5,000 people packing the theater to watch Cyr's act and witness his open challenge to the wide world of strongmen, many celebrities of which were in the audience, with a side wager of £1,000 (Equivalent to about £98,070 as of 2015). It was on this historical occasion, on 19 January 1892 that Cyr pressed the pre-mentioned 273.75 lb. dumbbell. Many years later Doc Aumont, son-in-law of Louis, loaned Cyr's famous dumbbell to the Weider's Your Physique office in Montreal for a month, during which time over 500 people tried and failed to lift the weight.

During his first London show, many other feats followed, all exceeding contemporary records, culminating in the famous Backlift. Placing a number of men upon a heavy platform resting across two trestles, Louis ducked beneath the platform, placed his back below the center, and raised both the contraption and the passengers clear off the trestles. Weight on this occasion was estimated at 3,635 lb. Traveling extensively throughout the UK he also visited Scotland, raising and carrying for a distance one of the famed Dinnie Stones. Cyr was very popular in Britain, being feted by celebrities and Royalty alike, including the Prince of Wales and Queen Victoria.

After returning to the U.S.A. on 27 May, Cyr did his best back lift in Boston, with over 4,000 lb estimated, consisting of 18 'bulky' men.

=== Clean and jerk ===
During his most active period, circa 1896, on March 31 he did a clean and jerk (the clean is a misnomer) of 347 lb, then a World record, without science or skill, little if any dipping.

Reputable witness Oscar Mathes said the lift was closer to a straight-legged press. Cyr did a one-handed deadlift with a dumbbell weighing 525 lb (238 kg), made harder by the fact that the bar was 1.5 inches thick. On 7 and 8 May 1896, he performed a crucifix with 97.25 lb (44.11 kg) in his right hand, and 88 lb (40 kg) in his left. Some authors often credit him with holding out with one arm.- 131.25 lb (59.53 kg). He also dumbbell pressed 162 lb for 36 reps, did a one finger lift, first with 552 lb and the next day made it 553 lb (251 kg). Lifted via one hand, style not specified, but most suspect using hand and thigh method, 987 lb (448 kg). plus again, using hand and thigh, 1,897.25 lb (860.58 kg).

For years, Louis pictured himself as a modern Biblical Samson with tresses to match. In the folds of his long hair, he would tie three fifty-pound weights, one on each side, and one in the center, with the three weights dangling from his scalp, he would also spin around, swirling the weights around his head. By co-incidence on his visit to Britain, the top of the pops was a ditty entitled 'Get Your Hair Cut." Louis must have taken the hint - he always sported short hair after the song's release.

More power of the arm and shoulder was demonstrated by his stunt of stacking four fifty pound weights one on top of the other on his half flexed arm, balancing them whilst walking across the room.

== Wrestling a giant ==
Cyr learned boxing and wrestling for a match. While in Montréal, Que., 25 March 1901, Louis Cyr wrestled Édouard Beaupré, who was known as a giant man. Cyr's height was measured at 5 feet 8.5 inches (1.740 metres) and he weighed 365 pounds (166 kilograms). Beaupré's height was measured at 8 feet 2.5 inches (2.502 metres) and he weighed 365 pounds (166 kilograms). Cyr won.

== Death ==
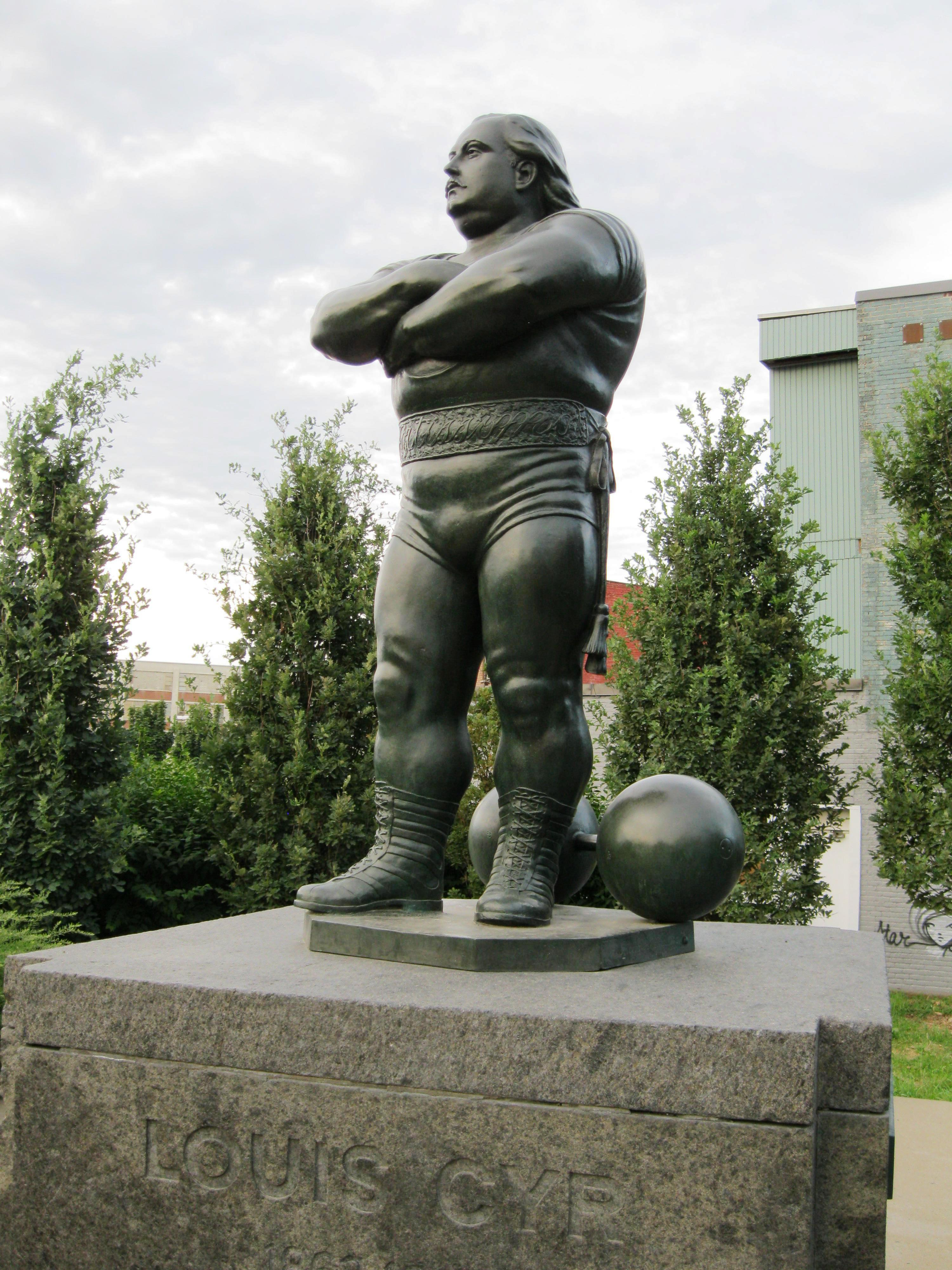
Monument to Louis Cyr by Robert Pelletier in Place des Hommes-Forts in Montreal

By 1904, Cyr's health began to fail due to excessive eating and inactivity. At the time, he weighed 400 pounds (180 kg). He slimmed down as best he could for his last contest of strength, with Hector De Carrie. Cyr retained his title and retired unvanquished.

Cyr died on November 10, 1912, in Montreal, of chronic nephritis and was interred at St-Jean-De-Matha. Great homage was paid by all of Canada, with immense crowds attending the funeral and floral tributes coming from all over the world.

He was portrayed by Antoine Bertrand in the 2013 biographical film Louis Cyr, l'homme le plus fort du monde.

== World records ==
As shown in movie Louis Cyr

- Crucifix: 97 3/4 pounds (44.3 kg) left hand and 88 pounds (40 kg) right hand
- One-handed snatch: 188 1/2 pounds (85.5 kg)
- One-handed press: 313 pounds (142 kg)
- Back lift: 4,337 pounds (1,967 kg)
- Two-handed lift: 1,897 pounds (860 kg)

== Bibliography ==
- Weider, B. 1976. The Strongest Man in History: Louis Cyr, Amazing Canadian. Translation of Louis Cyr, l’homme le plus fort du monde. Vancouver: Mitchell Press.
- Debon, Nicolas. 2007. The Strongest Man in the World: Louis Cyr. Toronto: Groundwood Books.
