= Fan club (disambiguation) =

A fan club is a group that is dedicated to a well-known person, group, idea or sometimes an inanimate object.

Fan club may also refer to:

- Fan Club (Alexia album), 1997
- Fan Club (Jellyfish album)
- Fan Club (TV series), a Quebec television series
- Fanclub (album), a 2006 album by Asian Kung-Fu Generation
- Fan Clubs, an episode of Hi Hi Puffy AmiYumi
- The Fan Club, a 1974 novel by Irving Wallace
- "Fan Club", a song by The Damned on their 1977 album Damned Damned Damned

== See also ==
- Aishah and The Fan Club, a New Zealand band
