= Arefeh Mansouri =

Iranian fashion and costume designer

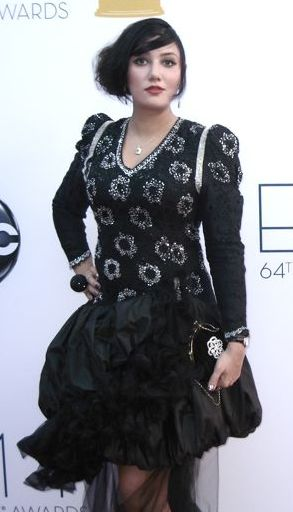
- Mansouri at the Emmy Awards in 2012
- Born: November 8, 1980 (age 45); Tehran, Iran
- Education: Concordia University; LaSalle College; Harvard University
- Occupations: Fashion designer, Costume designer
- Awards: Bronze Award for Avant-Garde design at the International Design Awards (2013) Silver Award for Couture and Avant-Garde Wedding Apparel at the International Design Awards (2017)
- Website: arefeh.com

Arefeh Mansouri (born November 8, 1980) is an Iranian fashion and costume designer. Her work has appeared in magazines such as Vogue, Elle, WWD, Marie Claire, InStyle among others.

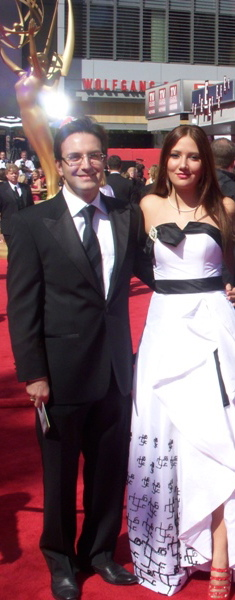
Arefeh Mansouri at the 61st Primetime Emmy Awards (NOKIA Theatre, September 20, 2009)

== Early life and education ==
Mansouri was born November 8, 1980, in Tehran, Iran, and immigrated to Canada at 16. During her early years, Mansouri displayed great interest and aptitude in painting. She started her undergraduate education with a major in biology at Concordia University with the intent to pursue a career in medicine. She began her studies of fashion at Montreal's LaSalle College. In 2016 Mansouri received an "Executive Education" from Harvard University, John F. Kennedy School of Government.

== Career ==
Mansouri launched a women's prêt-à-porter line until she was offered a position in Milan, Italy as head designer for an Italian clothing firm. In 2007, she relaunched her line in the United States with a specific focus on Couture Wedding and Evening wear. In addition, she began pursuing her passion for costume design and had pieces featured in Hollywood productions. Mansouri is a member of The Academy of Television Arts & Sciences and the Costume Designers Guild as a costume designer. In 2009, Mansouri was asked to collaborate with Entertainment Weekly and Women in Film to design tote bags for the Emmy Awards pre-party.

In 2011, Mansouri created a dress based on Karel Appel's Sculpture the Tulip. In 2012, Mansouri collaborated with Juan Pont Lezica to recreate a photograph of Sir Fredric Leighton's painting the Flaming June. The picture was exhibited at The Parthenon, Nashville's Art Museum.

In 2013, Mansouri established her signature store, "AREFEH", at 150 Worth Avenue in Palm Beach, Florida. In 2016, she relocated her store to Miami's Coral Gables, Florida.

In 2014, Mansouri was invited by Women's Wear Daily and Magic to attend a three-day trade show at WWDMAGIC, in Las Vegas, to show her latest collection.

In 2015, Mansouri was included in the bestseller Jewels of Allah The Untold Story of Women in Iran, written by Nina Ansary. In 2016, Mansouri was nominated for National Design Awards by Cooper-Hewitt, National Design Museum.

In 2017, Mansouri was awarded Second Prize in Apparel Category Competition for the Couture and Avant Garde Wedding Apparel Project at the International Design Awards.

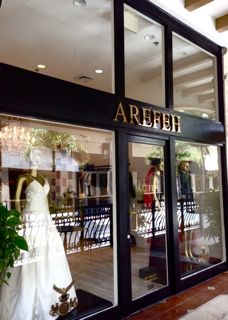
The AREFEH Shop at 150 Worth Avenue, Palm Beach, USA in 2013

== Flat Plat ==
Mansouri is one of the youngest inventors to be granted a U.S. patent in the area of women's shoes. "Flat Plat" is a flat shoe that uses a proprietary outsole that is engineered for maximum comfort and support. On 5 May, 2015, Mansouri was awarded a US patent for her invention.

== Filmography ==
- Utopia (2015) Costume Designer
- Drunk Wedding (2015) Costume Designer
- Time Out of Mind (2014) Set Dressing
- Song One (2014) Set Dressing
- So Undercover (2012) Costumes
- The Brass Teapot (2012) Costumes
- What's Your Number? (2011) Costumes
- The Bling Ring (2011) Wardrobe
- Beauty & the Briefcase (2010) Costumes
