= Benjamin Duffield (film editor) =

Benjamin Duffield is a Canadian film and television editor. He is most noted for his work on the 2016 film Rumble: The Indians Who Rocked the World, for which he was cowinner with Jeremiah Hayes of the Canadian Screen Award for Best Editing in a Documentary at the 6th Canadian Screen Awards in 2018.

He is also a three-time Gemini Award/CSA nominee for Best Picture Editing in a Comedy, Variety or Performing Arts Program or Series, receiving nominations for 18 to Life at the 25th Gemini Awards in 2010 and the 26th Gemini Awards in 2011, and for Seed at the 2nd Canadian Screen Awards in 2014.

His other credits have included the television series Big Wolf on Campus, 15/Love, The Lost World, Grand Star, Being Human, 19-2 and Happily Married (C'est comme ça que je t'aime), and the films These Girls, The High Cost of Living, Mr. Mergler's Gift, Sam and Fanny.

== Personal life ==
He is not married and does not have kids.
