= Yamaska (TV series) =

Canadian television series

Yamaska is a French-Canadian drama series airing on TVA. It was created by Anne Boyer and Michel D'Astous and seven seasons have been broadcast starting 28 September 2009.

== Synopsis ==
The drama series runs around three families, the Harrison, the Carpentier and the Brabant families living in Granby.

== Cast ==
=== Harrison Family ===
- Normand D'Amour as William Harrison
- Chantal Fontaine as Julie Davignon
- Adam Kosh as Lambert Harrison
- Yan England as Brian Harrison
- Roxanne Gaudette-Loiseau as Ingrid Harrison
- Gabriel Maillé as Frédérick Harrison
- Michel Dumont as Zachary Harrison
- Maude Laurendeau as Victoria

=== Carpentier Family ===
- Denis Bernard as Phillipe Carpentier
- Élise Guilbault as Réjeanne Carpentier
- Pascal Darilus as Geoffroy Carpentier
- François Arnaud as Théo Carpentier (season 1)
- Guillaume Perreault as Théo Carpentier (season 2)
- Sylvie De Morais as Sacha Carpentier

=== Brabant Family ===
- Patricia Nolin as Marthe Brabant
- Patrick Labbé as Étienne Brabant
- Anne-Marie Cadieux as Hélène Brabant
- Émile Mailhiot as Olivier Brabant
