= Stonemouth =

2012 novel by Iain Banks

- First edition
- Author: Iain Banks
- Language: English
- Publisher: Little, Brown and Company
- Publication date: 5 April 2012
- Publication place: Scotland
- Media type: Print (Hardback)
- Pages: 368 pp
- ISBN: 1408702509

Stonemouth is a 2012 novel by Scottish author Iain Banks. The novel was published on 5 April 2012 by Little, Brown and Company and follows a man returning to a small seaport town after being forced to flee five years earlier. The Irish Times picked the book as one of their "Books to Read in 2012".

== Plot summary ==
Stewart Gilmour returns to Stonemouth, a fictional seaport town north of Aberdeen, for a funeral. It is five years since he ran away to London after a sexual indiscretion at a wedding. Stonemouth is controlled by two rival gangs, the Murstons and the MacAvetts, and Gilmour was engaged to a member of the former clan before he had to leave.

== Reception ==
Critical reception for Stonemouth was mostly positive. Some criticisms of the book included some of the references to modern technology being "unauthentic", while praise for the novel centred on the plot's mystery.

== Adaptation ==
An adaptation for BBC Television was announced in 2014, starring Christian Cooke as Stewart Gilmour, with Peter Mullan, Sharon Small and Gary Lewis. Location filming took place in Macduff, Aberdeenshire in November 2014. It premiered on 8 June 2015 on BBC One Scotland, and 11 June 2015 on BBC Two in the rest of the UK.
