= Random Recipe =

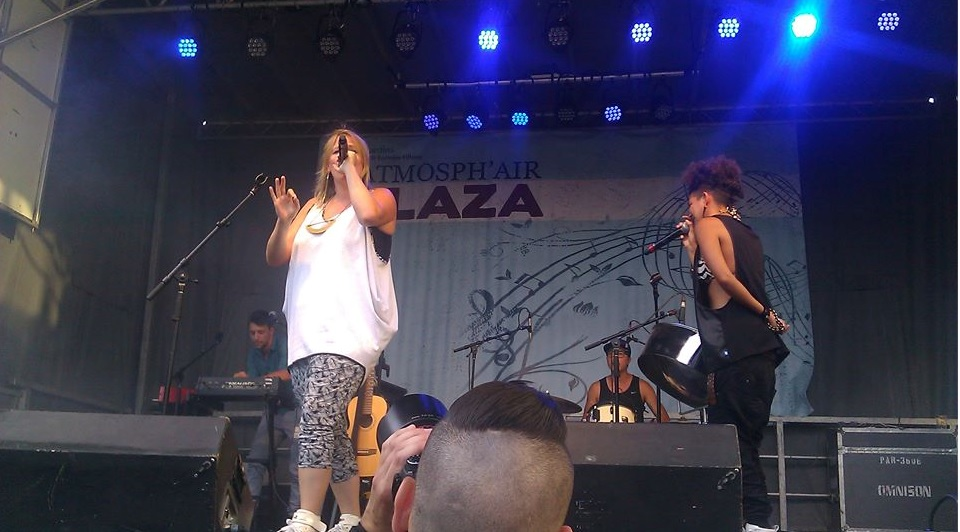

Background information
- Origin: Montreal, Quebec, Canada
- Genres: Hip hop, pop, indie rock, trip hop, folktronica
- Years active: 2007–present
- Label: Bonsound Records
- Spinoffs: Dear Criminals, FABjustfab
- Members: Frannie Holder; Fabrizia Di Fruscia a.k.a. FAB; Vincent Legault; Liu-Kong Ha; Florent Legault
- Website: randomrecipe.ca

Random Recipe is a Canadian musical group based in Montreal, Quebec. The band members are Frannie Holder (vocals and guitar), Fab (rap, beatbox, steeldrum), Vincent Legault (guitar and keys), and Liu-Kong Ha (percussion and keys). Although the band performs and records primarily in English, many of their songs contain Spanish and Italian lyrics. The band has toured in North and South America and Europe, and has released four albums of pop/folk/rap music.

== History ==
=== Founding ===
Holder and Fab met in 2005 while both students at university, studying political science at McGill University and translation at Concordia University, respectively. Their first public performances were free-of-charge and spontaneous, including busking in parks, in taxis, and on the Montreal metro.

In 2007, the pair formed Random Recipe. In 2008, they performed as part of the Pop! Montreal festival, and were hailed by Spin Magazine as one of the top 5 up-and-coming Montreal bands. Their sound was described as eclectic yet accessible; a mix between CocoRosie and the Beastie Boys. In 2009, they received the award for best new group by the Montreal International Music Initiative (MIMI).

=== 2010–2013 ===
In 2010, Random Recipe performed at the Halifax Pop Explosion. They signed with Bonsound Records and in September released an album, Fold It! Mold It!, which appeared on the !Earshot National Top 50 Chart in October. That year, and the next, they performed at the Festival d'été de Québec and at M for Montreal.

The group continued to put on impromptu shows at poutineries and pizzerias. Legault, who studied percussion and guitar jazz at McGill University and Liu-Kong Ha who studied at the Conservatoire de Musique du Québec à Montréal) joined the band, rounding out the group's sound to include xylophone, melodica, omnichord, steel drums, and kazoo.

In July 2011, Random Recipe participated in the Canada Day Celebrations on Parliament Hill in Ottawa, performing to an audience that included William and Kate, the Duke and Duchess of Cambridge. They also played at the SXSW festival in Austin, Texas. Random Recipe was awarded the 2011 Mirroir prize for Best Canadian Artist and RIDEAU's 2011 Étoiles Galaxie prize. The band was nominated in three categories at the 2011 ADISQ (Album of the year - Anglophone, Quebec artist of the year - Other languages, and Album artwork of the year).

Fold It! Mold It!; was re-released and in January 2012 in France via Chapter Two Records. Random Recipe later took part in collaborations with Pierre Lapointe, Alex Nevsky, DJ Champion, and Jérôme Minière.

In this era, Holder and Legault formed the side project Dear Criminals to work on composing music for theatrical, film and dance works outside of Random Recipe.

=== 2014–present ===
In February 2014, Florent Legault was hired as a fifth musician to accompany the band on long tours. That year the band performed again at the SXSW festival. Vincent Legault, not fond of extensive travel, left the group in 2015.

In 2018, after returning for a tour in South America, Random Recipe released their fourth album, Distractions. A single, "Fight the Feeling", from the album received regular airplay on Radio Canada. The band then headed out for a tour in Europe, including a set at the Ypsigrock Festival in Sicily.

In 2020, Toyota released a TV commercial for their Toyota Yaris which featured Random Recipe's song "Out of the Sky".

== Discography ==
Random Recipe have released four full-length albums, the first three through Bonsound Records and their most recent album independently.

Album	Release date
Fold It! Mold It!	September 2010
Shake It! Bake It!	October 2011
Kill the Hook	October 2013
Distractions	March 2018
