= 1:54 (film) =

- French-language theatrical release poster
- Directed by: Yan England
- Screenplay by: Yan England
- Produced by: Diane England; Denise Robert
- Starring: Antoine Olivier Pilon; Lou-Pascal Tremblay; Sophie Nélisse; David Boutin; Patrice Godin; Robert Naylor; Anthony Therrien
- Cinematography: Claudine Sauvé
- Edited by: Philippe Gagnon
- Music by: Raphael Reed
- Production company: Cinémaginaire Inc.
- Distributed by: Les Films Séville
- Release date: August 24, 2016 (FFA)
- Running time: 106 minutes
- Country: Canada
- Language: French

1:54 is a 2016 Canadian drama film directed by Yan England. Starring Antoine Olivier Pilon, Lou-Pascal Tremblay and Sophie Nélisse, it also features roles by David Boutin, Patrice Godin, Robert Naylor and Anthony Therrien. The film, launched on wider screens on 13 October 2016, tackles the phenomenon of bullying in schools.

== Plot ==
Tim, a 16-year-old timid yet brilliant student (played by Antoine Olivier Pilon), has been suffering from bullying in school and seemingly non-stopping intimidation and menace for the last 5 years by some of his schoolmates and particularly at the hands of the arch-bully in his school Jeff Roy (played by Lou-Pascal Tremblay). Tim who lives with his father (played by David Boutin) after his mother's early death, cannot confide in his own father despite the latter's efforts to get to the bottom of what is ailing his son.

Tim's situation becomes even more precarious in his grade 11 year, because of his continuing friendship with classmate Francis (played by Robert Naylor), a gay youth and Tim's struggles with his own sexuality and his increasing infatuation with Francis, although Tim is reluctant of going public about it. Tim is reluctant to go to the school authorities as he is "no snitch", but finds solace in the friendship of Jennifer (played by Sophie Nélisse), a schoolmate who takes Tim's case to heart. After a dramatic outing of Francis, and Tim's erratic behaviour distancing himself at least publicly from him for the fear of being exposed himself, Francis commits suicide despite Tim's pleas.

Viewers gradually learn that Tim used to be a star runner but had stopped a couple of years back when his mother died. Mr. Sullivan (played by Patrice Godin), the coach of the school running team, is pushing hard to have Tim return to racing, and eventually Tim decides to do just that — mainly because he sees it as his opportunity to get even with Jeff. His move to join "Les Coriaces" a sports club for the sole ambition of qualifying for the Nationals for the 800 m running event, the specialty of his tormentor and school star athlete Jeff. This is Tim's way of getting even with Jeff for all the suffering Jeff has caused. The title 1:54 is the time Tim has to make running the 800 m to qualify to the Nationals for the distance.

Matters turns to worst as in a weak moment after a school bingeing party, Tim intoxicated with alcohol engages in a casual gay sex encounter while Jeff films the whole incident on his phone. As Tim catches up with Jeff's coveted time of 1:54 in running, Jeff first blackmails Tim with publishing the footage on social media in case Tim goes on with his scheme of stealing Jeff's position in qualifying. During the final run, a desperate and vindictive Jeff first intimidates Tim and then in a desperate move seeing Tim's insistence in winning the race, instructs his friend to publish the footage online. Tim confronted with his painful outing and public shaming, finds support from his father towards his son's sexuality and outing. The father also who pleads with the school board to stop Jeff and arranges for his son finishing his school year through home schooling with help from his school and teachers. But it is too late, as Tim has already prepared a makeshift bomb to blast Jeff's celebration party after the latter's victory and qualification to the Nationals. He has also released a video footage on his own online page explaining why he is engaging in this final act. Tim had developed his skill of bomb-making through chemical experiments he had conducted in preparation with a joint lab project earlier with his now-deceased friend Francis. In his last moment of remorse of possibly causing great havoc and mayhem, he tries to remove the bomb he has placed, but dies himself as the bomb explodes in his hands. The last scene shows the reactions of many who knew Tim and could do nothing, with the friend of Jeff - and not Jeff himself - in a remorseful mood trying to justify or self-excuse himself by saying that his actions were meant as "just a joke".

== Cast ==
- Antoine Olivier Pilon as Tim
- Sophie Nélisse as Jennifer
- Lou-Pascal Tremblay as Jeff
- David Boutin as Pierre
- Patrice Godin as M. Sullivan
- Robert Naylor as Francis
- Anthony Therrien as Patrick
- Guillaume Gauthier as David
- Irdens Exantus as Fred
- Karl-Antoine Suprice as Sydney
- Laurie-Jade Rochon as Zoé
- Benoit Finley as supervisor
- Renée Cossette as headmaster Mathieu
- Émile Mailhiot as physical education instructor
- Ariane Jeudy as Isabelle
- Hudson Leblanc as young Tim
- Louis-Julien Durso as young Jeff
- Justine Le as a 13-year-old girl
- Gabrielle Shulman as a 13-year-old girl
- Francis Tremblay as party boy
- Jasmina Parent as a groupie
- Louis-Olivier Maufette as investigator Bérubé
- Richard Champagne as policeman

== Impact ==
The film was featured during the 2016 Quebec City Film Festival with the film winning the award for "Best Student Film" and the film's star Antoine Olivier Pilon the award for "Best Actor" during the festival. It was also featured during the Busan International Film Festival in South Korea, the 9th edition of the Angoulême Francophone Film Festival in France (23-28 August 2016) and the 31st Festival International du Film Francophone de Namur in Belgium (30 September to 6 October 2016).

The film is England's debut long feature film, following his short film Henry, which was a finalist during the 85th Academy Awards for the category of Best Live Action Short Film.

The Quebec City Film Festival screening held in the Palais Montcalm on 23 September 2016 was attended by Premier of Quebec Philippe Couillard, a number of government ministers and Quebec City mayor Régis Labeaume.

The film has prompted wider discussion in Canadian schools with demands of showing the film in various schools to encourage open discussions and wider public awareness of important issues the film tackles like competitiveness in youth sports and rivalry between athletes, bullying, physical violence, verbal abuse and intimidation in schools, sexual orientation among youth and teenage homosexuality, public outing, online shaming, youth suicide, ostracism, blackmail, rejection, humiliation, desperation, vengeance, and handling of grief. At the 19th Quebec Cinema Awards, Pilon was nominated for Best Actor and 1:54 was nominated for the Public Prize. It won the Public Prize, chosen by viewers' votes.
