= Rose-Maïté Erkoreka =

Canadian actress and playwright

Rose-Maïté Erkoreka (born July 11, 1976) is a Canadian actress and playwright from Quebec. She is most noted for her performance in the 2013 film Louis Cyr (Louis Cyr, l'homme le plus fort du monde), for which she received a Jutra Award nomination for Best Actress at the 16th Jutra Awards in 2014.

A graduate of the Conservatoire d'art dramatique de Montréal, she has also appeared in the films The Barbarian Invasions (Les Invasions barbares), Nouvelles, nouvelles and Waiting for April (En attendant avril), and the television series Providence, Les Hauts et les bas de Sophie Paquin, Une grenade avec ça?, Trauma, District 31 and Classé secret (2022).

Her first theatrical play, Souveraines, premiered at Montreal's Théâtre de Quat'Sous in 2018.
