= The Art of More =

- Genre: Drama
- Created by: Chuck Rose
- Starring: Christian Cooke; Kate Bosworth; Cary Elwes; Dennis Quaid
- Country of origin: United States
- Original language: English
- No. of seasons: 2
- No. of episodes: 20

Production
- Running time: 43–46 minutes
- Production companies: Muse Entertainment; Laurence Mark Productions

Original release
- Network: Crackle
- Release: November 19, 2015 – November 16, 2016

The Art of More is an American drama television series which debuted on November 19, 2015, on Crackle.

On December 2, 2015, Crackle renewed the series for a second season which consists of 10 episodes. Filming for season two began in early 2016, and was released on November 16, 2016.

== Premise ==
The series explores the underbelly and surprisingly cutthroat high-stakes world of New York auction houses.

== Cast and characters ==
- Christian Cooke as Thomas Graham Connor
- Kate Bosworth as Roxanna Whitman
- Cary Elwes as Arthur Davenport
- Dennis Quaid as Samuel Brukner
- Joe Cobden as Todd Fletcher

== Episodes ==
=== Series overview ===
Season	Episodes	Originally released
1	10	November 19, 2015
2	10	November 16, 2016

=== Season 1 (2015) ===
No. overall	No. in season	Title	Directed by	Written by	Original release date
1	1	"Heavy Lies the Head"	Gary Fleder	Chuck Rose	November 19, 2015
2	2	"Whodunnit?"	Gary Fleder	Gardner Stern	November 19, 2015
3	3	"Mint Condition"	Steven A. Adelson	Chuck Rose	November 19, 2015
4	4	"Just Say Faux"	Steven A. Adelson	Gardner Stern	November 19, 2015
5	5	"One Ton Depot"	Érik Canuel	Chuck Rose	November 19, 2015
6	6	"Ride Along"	Érik Canuel	Evan Hart & Kyle Stephen	November 19, 2015
7	7	"The Quatrefoil"	Shawn Piller	David Kob	November 19, 2015
8	8	"The Name of the Game"	Shawn Piller	Chuck Rose	November 19, 2015
9	9	"The Interview"	Jeff Renfroe	David Kob	November 19, 2015
10	10	"The Card Players"	Jeff Renfroe	Chuck Rose	November 19, 2015

=== Season 2 (2016) ===
No. overall	No. in season	Title	Directed by	Written by	Original release date
11	1	"The Pecking Order"	Rob Lieberman	Brendan Kelly	November 16, 2016
12	2	"Man on a Rope"	Rob Lieberman	Chuck Rose	November 16, 2016
13	3	"Hikori"	Nathaniel Goodman	Gardner Stern	November 16, 2016
14	4	"El Calvo"	Nathaniel Goodman	Steven Edell	November 16, 2016
15	5	"Better a Lion Than a Sheep"	Jeff Renfroe	Lane Williamson	November 16, 2016
16	6	"The Past Ain't Done"	Jeff Renfroe	Steven Edell	November 16, 2016
17	7	"Tears of a Clown"	Sturla Gunnarsson	Chuck Rose	November 16, 2016
18	8	"Stories We Tell Ourselves"	Sturla Gunnarsson	Lane Williamson	November 16, 2016
19	9	"13th Floor"	Kelly Makin	Brendan Kelly	November 16, 2016
20	10	"A Half Inch"	Kelly Makin	Brendan Kelly	November 16, 2016
