= Milya Corbeil Gauvreau =

Canadian actor (born 2002)

Milya Corbeil Gauvreau (born October 18, 2002) is a Canadian actress from Montreal, Quebec. She is most noted for her performance in the 2025 film Fanny, for which she received a Canadian Screen Award nomination for Best Lead Performance in a Drama Film at the 14th Canadian Screen Awards in 2026.

She began her career as a child actress, with roles in short films such as Trotteur and The Cut (La Coupe), before being cast as the young Nelly Arcan in the 2016 film Nelly. Her later roles included Cross My Heart (Les Rois mongols), for which she won the award for Best Actress at the Angoulême Francophone Film Festival in 2018.

== Filmography ==
=== Film ===
Year	Title	Role	Notes
2011	Trotteur		
2014	The Cut (La Coupe)	Fanny	
2015	The Demons (Les Démons)	Sophie	
2016	Nelly	Young Nelly Arcan	
2017	Cross My Heart (Les Rois Mongols)	Manon	
2018	Teenage Fever (Fièvre adolescente)	Oriane	
2018	Plume	Luna	
2019	Speak Love	Liliane	
2020	All About Girls (Les filles aussi)	Victoria	
2021	Sam	Océane	
2023	Evergreen$ (Sapin$)	Hamburger	
2025	Fanny	Fanny Cloutier	
2025	My Stepmother Is a Witch (Ma belle-mère est une sorcière)	Adèle	

=== Television ===
Year	Title	Role	Notes
2013-2016	Just Kidding	Isabelle	Nine episodes
2015	Subito Texto	Cindy Gladu	One episode
2018	District 31	Léticia Nolin-Drapeau	One episode
2019	Avec moi	Rosie	
2019-2020	Le 422	Olivara	13 episodes
2020	La vie compliquée de Léa Oliver	Marianne	Five episodes
2021	Piégés	Amélie Lussier	Six episodes
2022	L'Homme qui aimait trop	Karine Drouin	
2023	Detective Surprenant	Rosalie Richard	Six episodes
2022-2024	Les bracelets rouges	Lou Sirois	22 episodes
2024	Liam	Rafaëlle Perron	
2024	Contre-offre	Léa Laganière	Two episodes
