= Wilmot (TV series) =

- Genre: Sitcom
- Created by: Alex Shearer
- Written by: Alex Shearer
- Directed by: John Smith
- Starring: Heston Aniteye; Christian Cooke; Carole Copeland; Stefan Escreet; Katie Ferguson; Katie Hodgson; Stefan Podolchuk; Alan Rothwell
- Country of origin: United Kingdom
- Original language: English
- No. of series: 2
- No. of episodes: 13

Production
- Executive producer: Patrick Titley
- Producer: John Smith
- Running time: 28 minutes
- Production company: Yorkshire Television

Original release
- Network: ITV (CITV)
- Release: 5 May 1999 – 2 November 2000

Wilmot is a British children's television sitcom co-produced by Yorkshire Television and Granada Television in 1999–2000. It ran for two series with a total of 13 episodes, beginning with its pilot episode, "Wilmot and Spoons," which aired on 5 May 1999. It was cancelled in 2000.

The sitcom was created by scriptwriter Alex Shearer. The sitcom's main characters were the titular child Wilmot Tanner and his elder brother Terry. Wilmot, a boy living in a fantasy world, often found himself in scrapes.

== Cast ==
- Christian Cooke as Wilmot Tanner
- Stefan Podolchuk as Terry Tanner
- Heston Aniteye as Martin
- Carole Copeland as Mrs Tanner
- Stefan Escreet as Mr Tanner
- Alan Rothwell as Mr Ronson
- Katie Ferguson as Amber Watts
- Katie Hodgson as Edith
