= Nelly (2016 film) =

2016 film by Anne Émond

- Theatrical poster
- Directed by: Anne Émond
- Screenplay by: Anne Émond
- Based on: Folle (and other works) by Nelly Arcan
- Produced by: Nicole Robert
- Starring: Mylène Mackay; Mickaël Gouin; Sylvie Drapeau; Milya Corbeil Gauvreau; Francis Leplay
- Cinematography: Josée Deshaies
- Edited by: Mathieu Bouchard-Malo
- Music by: Frannie Holder; Charles Lavoie; Vincent Legault
- Production company: GO Films
- Distributed by: Les Films Séville
- Release dates: September 9, 2016 (TIFF); January 20, 2017 (Quebec)
- Running time: 101 minutes
- Country: Canada
- Language: French
- Budget: $4.1 million

Nelly is a 2016 Canadian biographical-drama film directed by Anne Émond and starring Mylène Mackay as Nelly Arcan, an award-winning Canadian author and former sex worker who committed suicide in 2009. The film is based on some of Arcan's own writings, including her book Putain.

After debuting at the 2016 Toronto International Film Festival, the film received some positive reviews, including for Mackay's performance. It was nominated for two Canadian Screen Awards and won for Best Costume Design.

== Plot ==
Isabelle Fortier is a young girl who develops a relationship and becomes engaged to a man, with whom she shares a cocaine habit. Their relationship deteriorates. Taking the pseudonym Cynthia, Isabelle becomes a prostitute. She receives rave online customer reviews, from clients who praise her for her physical features, service and aptitude in various sex acts. She begins to write about her experiences, submitting her first novel under the pen name Nelly Arcan to an editorial committee, who regard it with a combination of shock and interest. The publisher Mathieu travels to Montreal to meet her, inquiring if the stories contained in the novel are autobiographical. Initially questioning the importance of the novel's truthfulness, Nelly replies the stories are a combination of reality and invention. She also lies and says she is 26, as she had always wished to be published before turning 30.

The novel exceeds the bestseller benchmark of 5,000 sales, with 30,000 copies sold in Quebec and France. Nelly receives critical acclaim and is nominated for prestigious European literary awards. At the same time, she is conflicted about the exposure, feeling as if she lost something with the publication of the novel. Her adoring public is intrigued and eager to learn more about whether the stories she tells are true, while she becomes panicked that her next book may not sell or may be a critical failure. One reader inquires about an episode in her work where a prostitute jumps from a building to escape a violent client, which Nelly had extracted from a dream, and questions her about her later books falling in sales.

In confession, Nelly speaks of how everything in her life seems to be killing her, and questions if Nelly Arcan or Isabelle Fortier is the real mask. She finally commits suicide after three books have been published, with a fourth published posthumously.

== Cast ==
- Mylène Mackay as Nelly Arcan
- Marie-Claude Guerin as Melina
- Sylvie Drapeau as Suzanne
- Milya Corbeil Gauvreau as Isabelle Fortier
- Francis Leplay as Mathieu
- Noa André as Vanessa
- Mickaël Gouin as François

== Production ==
The film is a biopic of the deceased writer Nelly Arcan, starring Mylène Mackay. Producer Nicole Robert intended to make a film adaptation of Arcan's book Putain while Arcan was still alive, and obtained the rights in 2003.

Director Anne Émond said she had re-read Arcan's books on multiple occasions, desiring to make a film adaptation. Robert recommended to her that she direct the film about Arcan. Émond spent a year writing a 102-page screenplay, then opted to rewrite it. It was finished after two years. Given the subject matter of the books, Émond said she was not reluctant to depict nudity and sexual content.

To play the part, Mylène Mackay learned to adjust her physical movements and speech, as well as her hair. She did not meet Arcan's family. For the clothing, costume designer Patricia McNeil collaborated with Simon Bélanger and José Manuel St-Jacques of UNTTLD, drawing inspiration from Marilyn Monroe. The film was shot in various locations, including an apartment in Saint-Zotique, Quebec, with two days in Paris, on a budget of $4.1 million.

== Release ==
The film had its world premiere at the Toronto International Film Festival in the Vanguard section in September 2016.

The film was released in Montreal on 20 January 2017. In Quebec, the Régie du cinéma gave the film a 16+ rating, which is rare except for soft-core pornography films.

== Reception ==
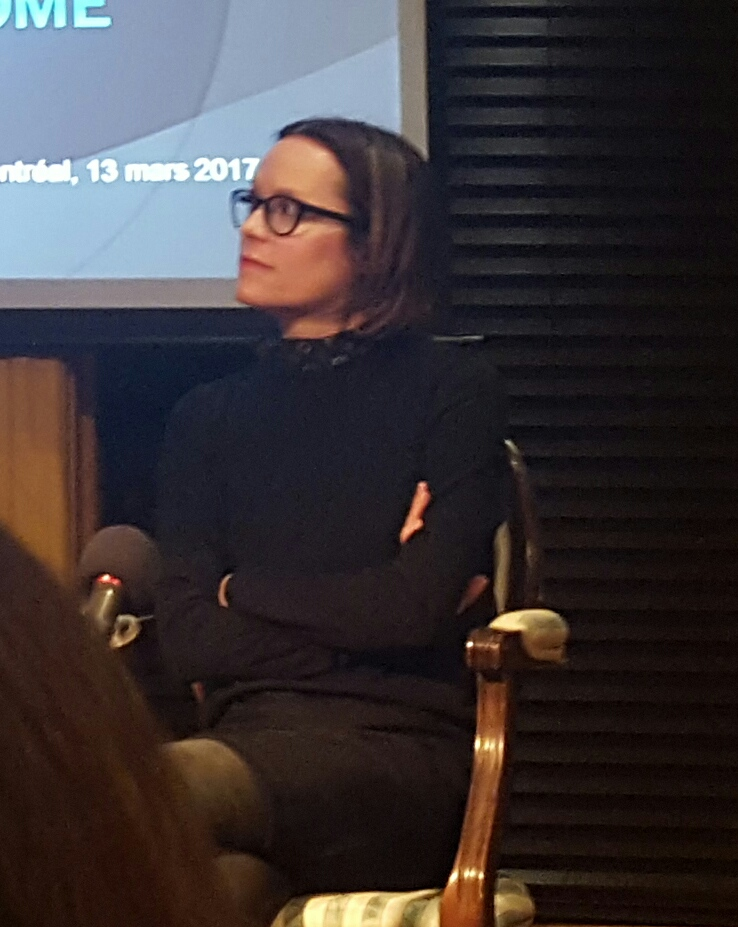
Professor Martine Delvaux analyzed the film's perspectives on Arcan.

=== Critical reception ===
On 7 December 2016, the film was named to the Toronto International Film Festival's annual Canada's Top 10 list. In The Globe and Mail, Julia Cooper called the film "electric," combining fiction and biography. Maxime Demers of Le Journal de Montréal praised Mackay for extraordinary acting.

The Montreal Gazette's T'cha Dunlevy awarded the film four stars, praising Mackay for "a towering performance" and finding dimensions in the story. In La Presse, Chantal Guy gave the film three and half stars, saying Émond avoided a giving sad and dull take on Arcan's suicide, and credited Mackay for her energetic efforts. In Voir, Jean-Baptiste Hervé said Mackay's performance had great impact and the film transcended the typical biographical film. Martin Gignac, writing for Métro, found the film intelligent and emotionally distant. Conversely, Sophie Durocher wrote in Le Journal de Montréal that she was disappointed with the film's derivative style, whereas Arcan had a unique voice.

=== Analysis ===
In Le Devoir, University of Sherbrooke Professor Isabelle Boisclair and PhD student Catherine Dussault Frenette wrote that the film was a biography of Arcan, but the real Arcan was not interested in a biographical approach. They felt the film confined Arcan to a certain character.

Université du Québec à Montréal Professor Martine Delvaux judged the film to be a study on various ways of seeing Arcan, as her original identity of Isabelle Fortier, as alter ego "Cynthia," as the public Nelly Arcan, and as Émond's invention. Delvaux, who had met Arcan personally, concluded the film did not truly reveal who Arcan was.

=== Accolades ===
Award	Date of ceremony	Category	Recipient(s)	Result	Ref(s)
Canadian Screen Awards	12 March 2017	Best Cinematography	Josée Deshaies	Nominated	
Canadian Screen Awards	12 March 2017	Best Costume Design	Patricia McNeil	Won	
Prix Iris	4 June 2017	Best Actress	Mylène Mackay	Won	
Prix Iris	4 June 2017	Best Cinematography	Josée Deshaies	Nominated	
Prix Iris	4 June 2017	Best Original Music	Frannie Holder, Charles Lavoie, Vincent Legault	Won	
Prix Iris	4 June 2017	Best Make-Up	Djina Caron	Won	
Prix Iris	4 June 2017	Best Hairdressing	Martin Lapointe	Won	
Prix Iris	4 June 2017	Most Successful Film Outside Quebec	Anne Émond	Nominated	
