= Louis Cyr (film) =

- Directed by: Daniel Roby
- Written by: Sylvain Guy
- Produced by: Caroline Héroux; Christian Larouche
- Starring: Antoine Bertrand; Gilbert Sicotte; Gil Bellows; Marilyn Castonguay
- Cinematography: Nicolas Bolduc
- Edited by: Yvann Thibaudeau
- Music by: Jorane
- Production company: Christal Films
- Release date: 12 July 2013
- Running time: 90 minutes
- Country: Canada
- Languages: French; English

Louis Cyr (French: Louis Cyr, l'homme le plus fort du monde) is a 2013 Canadian drama film. A biopic directed by Daniel Roby, the film stars Antoine Bertrand as Canadian strongman Louis Cyr. The film is based on a novel by Paul Ohl.

Its cast also includes Gilbert Sicotte, Rose-Maïté Erkoreka, Guillaume Cyr, Gil Bellows, Eliane Gagnon, Normand Carrière, Amélie Grenier, Cliff Saunders and Marilyn Castonguay. The film was nominated for four Canadian Screen Awards, winning two.

== Cast ==
- Antoine Bertrand - Louis Cyr
- Gilbert Sicotte - Gustave Lambert
- Guillaume Cyr - Horace Barré
- Rose-Maïté Erkoreka - Mélina Cyr
- Gil Bellows - Richard Fox
- Cliff Saunders - Mac Sohmer
- Amélie Grenier - Philomène Cyr

== Reception ==
The film was the top-grossing film of the year in Quebec.

=== Accolades ===
Award	Date of ceremony	Category	Recipient(s)	Result	Ref(s)
Canadian Screen Awards	9 March 2014	Best Art Direction / Production Design	Michel Proulx	Won	
Canadian Screen Awards	9 March 2014	Best Costume Design	Carmen Alie	Won	
Canadian Screen Awards	9 March 2014	Best Sound Editing	Antoine Morin, Christian Rivest, Guy Pelletier, Martin Pinsonnault, Mireille Morin and Paul Col	Nominated	
Canadian Screen Awards	9 March 2014	Best Visual Effects	Aélis Héraud, Antoine Wibaut, Catherine Hébert, Cyntha Carrier, David Raymond, Jonathan Legris, Josée Chapdelaine, Louis-Alexandre Lord, Pierre-Simon Lebrun-Chaput and Sarah Neveu	Nominated	
Jutra Awards	23 March 2014	Best Film	Christian Larouche, Caroline Héroux, Stephanie Heroux	Won	
Jutra Awards	23 March 2014	Best Director	Daniel Roby	Nominated	
Jutra Awards	23 March 2014	Best Actor	Antoine Bertrand	Won	
Jutra Awards	23 March 2014	Best Actress	Rose-Maïté Erkoreka	Nominated	
Jutra Awards	23 March 2014	Best Supporting Actor	Guillaume Cyr	Won	
Jutra Awards	23 March 2014	Best Cinematography	Nicolas Bolduc	Nominated	
Jutra Awards	23 March 2014	Best Art Direction	Michel Proulx	Won	
Jutra Awards	23 March 2014	Best Costume Design	Carmen Alie	Won	
Jutra Awards	23 March 2014	Best Hairstyling	Martin Lapointe	Won	
Jutra Awards	23 March 2014	Best Makeup	Nathalie Trépanier	Won	
Jutra Awards	23 March 2014	Best Sound	Martin Pinsonnault, Stéphane Bergeron and Simon Poudrette	Won	
Jutra Awards	23 March 2014	Golden Ticket	Christian Larouche, Caroline Héroux and Daniel Roby	Won	
