= Rematch (miniseries) =

French-Hungarian television miniseries

- Created by: Yan England; Bruno Nahon; André Gulluni
- Screenplay by: Yan England; André Gulluni
- Directed by: Yan England
- Starring: Christian Cooke
- Theme music composer: Grégoire Auger
- Countries of origin: France, Hungary
- Original language: English
- No. of series: 1
- No. of episodes: 6

Production
- Executive producer: Oliver Glaas
- Producer: Bruno Nahon
- Cinematography: Jéròme Sabourin; Xavier Sirven
- Editor: Jean-Baptiste-Beaudoin
- Running time: 52 min
- Production companies: Arte; Unité

Original release
- Network: Arte (France, Germany), Unité (France); Disney+ (UK)
- Release: 9 September – 23 September 2024

Rematch is a 2024 English-language French-Hungarian television miniseries starring Christian Cooke as the world chess champion Garry Kasparov, depicting his 1997 match against the IBM supercomputer Deep Blue.

== Premise ==
The series is described as an historical psychological thriller, and details Kasparov taking on Deep Blue in 1997, the first time a world champion lost a chess match to a computer.

== Cast ==
- Christian Cooke : Garry Kasparov
- Sarah Bolger : Helen Brock
- Trine Dyrholm : Klara Kasparova
- Aidan Quinn : Roger Laver
- Tom Austen : Paul Nelson
- Luke Pasqualino : Xavier Valens
- Orion Lee : "PC"
- Trieve Blackwood-Cambridge : Michael Brock
- Dulcie Smart : Vivian Laver
- Evelyn Crow : Sofia Kasparov

== Development and production ==
The six-part series was directed by Yan England and co-created with Bruno Nahon and André Gulluni. It was in development for seven years prior to being commissioned by French-German channel Arte in 2022. It was produced by ARTE France and Unité, alongside Federation Studios. The cast has Christian Cooke as Garry Kasparov and also includes Sarah Bolger, Trine Dyrholm, Aidan Quinn, Tom Austen, Luke Pasqualino and Orion Lee. Filming took place in Montreal and Budapest. The International Master, Malcolm Pein has said he worked as chess consultant on the project.

The co-creator and screenwriter, André Gulluni, originally from Quebec just like director Yan England, told the French newspaper Les Echos that it took seven years in total for the project to become reality: "It took a long time and on more than one occasion I thought we could never finish it. That was actually a real boon because we could take the time to write, sometimes putting the project aside then coming back to it. I kept thinking that Arte would call us and ask us to stop everything, but they gave us enough time to let it grow. That is very different from the way things go in America where everything must happen very fast [...] Moreover, it was a really complicated story that required a lot of research [...] I had the luxury of being able to polish it and of having a brilliant script doctor who spotted all the mistakes and flaws that could take us too far away from the topic. For sure, we had to master a lot of technical aspects, be it on the chess front or on the computer front. But I love technology in general, which made my job easier. And I relied on experts to make sure that what I was telling made sense, that it was plausible even if it wasn't necessarily true."

When Les Echos asked him if they had tried to reach Kasparov, Gulluni said "To do so towards the 'hero' of the story could have limited us for the plot. He is a very proud man, he may have tried to only shown us his qualities and not his flaws and life complications, for instance his difficult relationship with his ex-wife and children. This could have limited us. But we did talk to several people close to him like his ex-agent and a close friend of his, whom by the way lives in France. We also tried to reach the real 'PC', creator of Deep Blue, in reality nicknamed 'CB', but he never answered. We also tried in vain to talk to Joel Benjamin, whom we named Paul Nelson in the series, the grandmaster who trained Deep Blue at the time. I even had the cheek to try to reach his life companion to no end either. I talked to the Chess Federation he presides, of which he's a member, without success. There really seem to be quite a mystery about this rematch."

Gulluni concluded by saying: "Something happened during this rematch because of some added code lines by one of IBM's programmers to make him think Deep Blue was hesitating, which had a huge impact on destabilising Kasparov. Thus, the series voluntarily puts a doubt in PC's mind and the spectators' too about a potential cheat [from IBM]. We currently don't know what fully happened, but this symbolises that the computer [Deep Blue] isn't just a calculating machine anymore, as Paul says to 'PC' that the code didn't tell it when to hesitate. This is an AI milestone, this technology definitely marking the 21st century."

== Broadcast ==
The series first aired on RTS 1 channel in Switzerland then aired on French-German Arte channel and is now available on Disney+, HBO Europe and Apple TV+. It also streaming in India on Lionsgate Play from 18 July 2025.

== Reception ==
Charles Martin in Première praised Cooke's performance as Kasparov.

The series won the "Grand Prix de la compétition internationale" prize at Series Mania at Lille in France in March 2024.
