= Agyness Deyn =

English model and actress (born 1983)

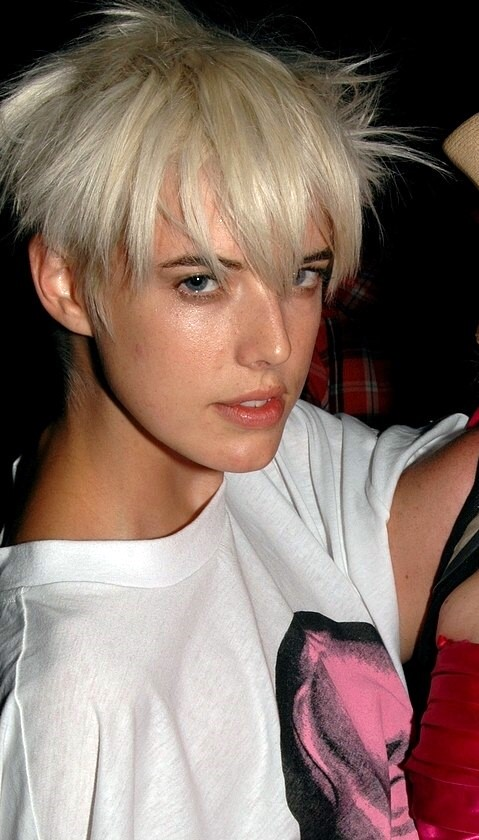
- Deyn in 2007
- Born: Laura Michelle Hollins; 16 February 1983 (age 43); Littleborough, Greater Manchester, England
- Occupations: Model; actress
- Years active: 2007–present
- Spouses: Giovanni Ribisi (m. 2012; div. 2015) Joel McAndrew (m. 2016)
- Modelling information
- Height: 1.73 m (5 ft 8 in)
- Hair colour: Blonde
- Eye colour: Blue
- Agency: Next Management

Agyness Deyn (/ˈæɡnɪs ˈdiːn/; born Laura Michelle Hollins, 16 February 1983) is an English model and actress. She is best known for her successful modelling career in the 2000s, and has been called one of the decade's top models. Since her retirement from modelling in the 2010s, she has pursued acting and design, among other ventures.

== Early life ==
Laura Michelle Hollins was born in Littleborough, Greater Manchester to Roman Catholic parents who later divorced. She spent her early childhood in Failsworth. The second of three children, Deyn grew up in Cloughfold next to Rawtenstall in Rossendale Valley, Lancashire. She attended All Saints Roman Catholic High School and completed her A Levels at Bacup and Rawtenstall Grammar School.

Deyn's name was apparently coined to further her modelling career after she consulted her mother's friend, a numerology expert, who advised her of the most 'fortuitous' way to spell the name 'Agnes'. It was reported that her mother, Lorraine (a nurse), and her sister Emily both changed their surname to Deyn, while Lorraine has changed the I in her first name to Y.

Deyn's working life started at a fish and chip shop in Stubbins, Rossendale, where she was a part-time server at the age of 13. Even at an early age she had an eye for style and by 17 she had already had her head shaved. "I've had short hair since I was 13, and when I was 17, I had a skinhead." In 1999, she won the Rossendale Free Press "Face of '99" competition, aged just 16. Deyn had her first modeling experience for Sunday Best, a local Rawtenstall boutique.

When her close friend Henry Holland moved to London to study fashion, Deyn would stay with him at his university halls. She worked in a fast-food restaurant during the day and a bar at night.

== Career ==
=== Modelling ===
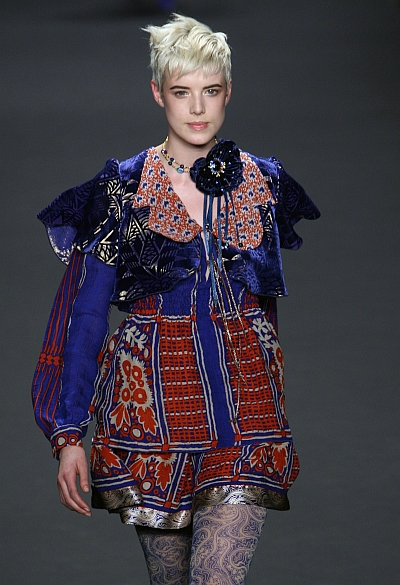
Deyn for Anna Sui in 2008

Deyn's biography claims that she was "spotted" while shopping with fashion designer Henry Holland in Kentish Town, London. She then signed with SELECT Model Management.

In May 2007, she was featured on the cover of American Vogue, alongside Doutzen Kroes, Caroline Trentini, Raquel Zimmermann, Sasha Pivovarova, Jessica Stam, Coco Rocha, Hilary Rhoda, Chanel Iman and Lily Donaldson as "The World's Next Top Models." She has also been featured on the covers of: UK Vogue, the Observer Woman supplement, The Sunday Times Style, Pop, Grazia, Time, Style & Life, Vogue Italia and numerous other international publications.

She has walked the runways for Chanel, Dolce & Gabbana, Burberry, Hermés, Dior, Lanvin, DKNY, Karl Lagerfeld, Moschino, Versace, Michael Kors, Zac Posen, Celine, Roberto Cavalli, Bottega Veneta, Proenza Schouler, Tommy Hilfiger, Stella McCartney, Viktor & Rolf, Max Mara, Oscar De La Renta, Ralph Lauren, Giles Deacon, Alexander Wang, Jean Paul Gaultier, Alberta Ferretti, Carolina Herrera, and Yves Saint Laurent.

Deyn has appeared in advertisements for Dior, Burberry, Emporio Armani, Calvin Klein, Moncler, Anna Sui, Giorgio Armani, John Galliano, Gianfranco Ferré, Blumarine, Vivienne Westwood, Cacharel, Doc Martens, Shiseido, Mulberry, Paul Smith, Adidas, and Reebok.

She has been the face of fragrance The Beat by Burberry, Gold by Giles Deacon at New Look replacing Drew Barrymore, Jean Paul Gaultier's fragrance Ma Dame, Shiseido (replacing Angelina Jolie), Rock Me! by Anna Sui, and childhood friend Henry Holland's label House of Holland. In 2009, Deyn landed a Uniqlo campaign and appeared in a commercial with Gabriel Aubry.

In May 2008, Deyn was guest editor of i-D magazine. The issue was devoted to her and includes articles written by and about Deyn, as well as interviews she conducted with fashion designers such as Vivienne Westwood. Deyn's was on one of the fourteen covers of V magazine autumn issue. Each cover employs a head shot of a famous model, either from new models or established supermodels; it was photographed by Inez van Lamsweerde and Vinoodh Matadin.

In June 2009, the Daily Mirror reported that Deyn had quit modeling to spend more time with her then boyfriend, singer-songwriter Miles Kane. The newspaper quoted a source as saying that modeling had started to bore Deyn and that she had hired an acting agent to pursue an acting career in British independent films.

Vogue Paris described her as one of the top 30 models of the 2000s.

Deyn appeared in the May 2011 British Vogue editorial, photographed by Tim Walker.

In October 2012, Deyn once reiterated that she had retired from modeling in an interview with The Independent. She stated, "I suppose I have stopped modeling officially. I've not done any for a good long while now. I think it was about four years ago when my feelings were changing towards the industry. I didn't hate it, but I was yearning to do something different. I was on a gradient. It was a gradual thing." She intends to focus on her acting career.

Deyn made an appearance on the Yves Saint Laurent stage in 2015. Deyn later reunited with Burberry, walking the runway for the brand at London Fashion Week in 2019 and 2024.

=== Music ===
Deyn provides vocals for the single "Who" by Five O'Clock Heroes as well as featuring in the video. The single was poorly received by NME, who gave it only a 2/10. The single charted at No. 109 in the UK. Until recently she was a member of the now defunct group Lucky Knitwear. Deyn's voice can be heard at the beginning of Rihanna's music video for "We Found Love".

=== Acting ===
In the 2010 film Clash of the Titans, Deyn played Aphrodite, Greek goddess of beauty, love, and sex.

In March 2011, Deyn appeared as an owl-bearing warrior in Woodkid's debut music video, "Iron".

In 2012, Deyn starred opposite Richard Coyle in Pusher, an English language remake of Nicolas Winding Refn's Danish film of the same name, where she played Flo, a strong-minded stripper.

On 28 February 2012, Deyn played her first role on the West End stage, as Paula in François Archambault's comedy, The Leisure Society. After receiving excellent reviews for her role in that play, Deyn was cast to play the main character, Chris Guthrie, in a film adaptation of the Scottish novel Sunset Song.

In 2013, Deyn played the lead role in Electricity, a film adaptation of the novel by Ray Robinson, about the journey of a young woman with epilepsy.

In 2015, she starred in the fantasy-horror thriller film Patient Zero.

In 2017, Deyn began filming Hard Sun, a pre-apocalyptic crime drama for the BBC at Hanstead Park in Bricket Wood, Hertfordshire.

In 2018, Deyn appeared in the Netflix original movie The Titan as Dr. Freya and starred in Alex Ross Perry's Her Smell as Marielle Hell, bassist for the fictional band Something She.

=== Design ventures ===
In 2010, Deyn collaborated with her younger sister Emily to create a line of T-shirts and tank tops for high street chain Uniqlo.

In 2012, Deyn began a design partnership with Dr. Martens called Agyness Deyn for Dr. Martens, a line of accessories, shoes, and clothing. In spring of 2014, she planned to release a third collaboration with the brand.

== Personal life ==
In the 2000s, she dated musicians Josh Hubbard of The Paddingtons, Albert Hammond Jr. of the Strokes, Alex Greenwald of Phantom Planet, and Miles Kane of the Last Shadow Puppets.

Deyn was married to American actor Giovanni Ribisi from 2012 to 2015. In August 2016, Deyn married hedge fund marketer Joel McAndrew in New York.
