= Nelly Arcan =

Canadian novelist

- Born: Isabelle Fortier; March 5, 1973; Lac-Mégantic, Quebec, Canada
- Died: September 24, 2009 (aged 36); Montreal, Quebec, Canada
- Occupation: Writer

Nelly Arcan (March 5, 1973 – September 24, 2009) was a Canadian novelist and former sex worker. Arcan was born Isabelle Fortier at Lac-Mégantic in the Eastern Townships of Quebec.

== Biography ==
Arcan's first novel Putain (2001; English: Whore (2004)) received immediate critical and media attention. It was a finalist for both the Prix Médicis and the Prix Fémina, two of France's most prestigious literary awards. It contains similarities between the escort Cynthia in the novel and Arcan's own experience as a professional escort sex worker.

Putain was followed with three more novels that established her as a literary star in Quebec and France. Her second novel Folle (2004), like her first, is a semi-autobiographical and provocative work, and was also nominated for the Prix Femina. Her third novel, À ciel ouvert, was published in 2007. L'enfant dans le miroir (2007) is a coffee-table illustrated book about beauty. Arcan had recently completed her fourth novel Paradis, clef en main (2009; English: Exit (2011)) when she died by suicide. She also wrote several short stories, opinion pieces and columns for various Quebec newspapers and literary magazines.

== Death ==
Arcan was found dead in her Montreal apartment on September 24, 2009. She hanged herself. She had just finished writing her last book, Paradis, Clef en main, whose narrator is left disabled after a suicide attempt. She had attempted suicide previously. On September 3, 2009, three weeks before her death, Arcan published a story in her weekly column in the Quebec French-language weekly Ici magazine entitled "Prends-moi, ou t'es mort" ("Take Me, or You're Dead"), detailing an experience with a stalker.

She is buried in Québec's Eastern Townships. Lac-Mégantic's municipal library, assembled from many of the over a hundred thousand books donated after fire destroyed the original library during 2013's Lac-Mégantic derailment, is named « La Médiathèque municipale Nelly-Arcan » in her honour.

Director Anne Émond's 2016 film Nelly is based on Arcan's life, starring Mylène Mackay as Arcan in her adult career and Milya Corbeil Gauvreau as Arcan in childhood.

== Bibliography ==
- Putain (2001; English: Whore, translated by Bruce Benderson, 2004).
- Folle (2004; English: Hysteric, translated by David Homel & Jacob Homel, 2014).
- L'enfant dans le miroir (2007).
- À ciel ouvert (2007; English: Breakneck, translated by Jacob Homel, Anvil Press, 2015).
- Paradis, clef en main (2009; English: Exit, translated by David Scott Hamilton, 2011).
- Burqa de chair (2011; English: Burqa of Skin, translated by Melissa Bull, Anvil Press, 2014).
