= Christian Cooke =

English actor (born 1986)

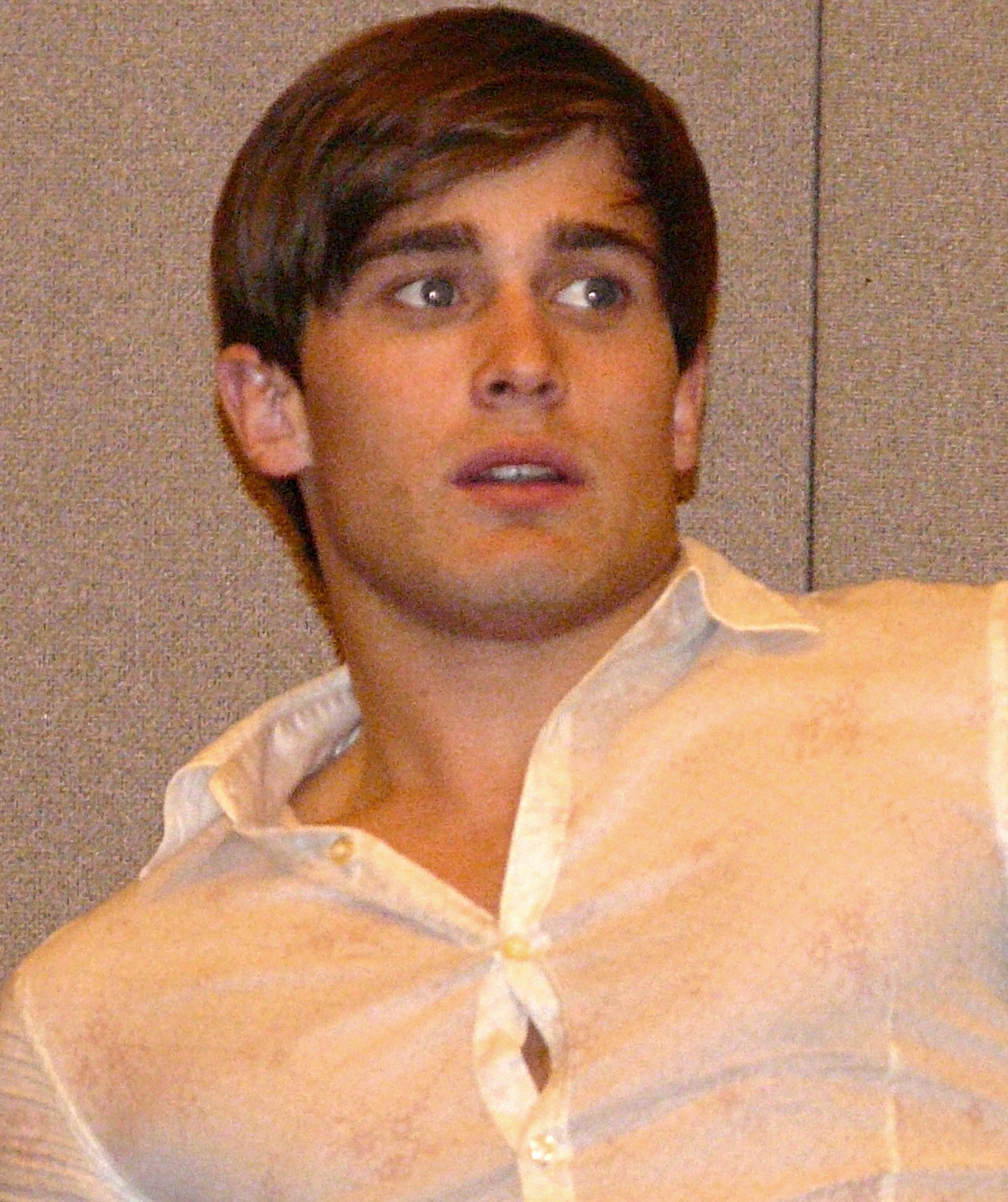
- Cooke at the 2008 London Film and Comic Con
- Born: 15 September 1986 (age 39); Bradford, West Yorkshire, England
- Occupations: Actor; director; producer
- Years active: 1999–present
- Relatives: Mel B (cousin)

Christian Louis Cooke (born 15 September 1986) is an English actor. He is known for playing Freddie Taylor in Cemetery Junction and Len Matthews in the Channel 4 mini series The Promise. Cooke played Garry Kasparov in the mini series Rematch on Disney +, and Ron in the movie Plainclothes, which won a Special Jury Award at Sundance 2025.

Other television roles include Magic City (2012–13) and That Dirty Black Bag for AMC, and his other film roles include Mercutio in Romeo & Juliet (2013), Electricity (2014), Love, Rosie (2014) and Drunk Wedding (2015).

== Early life and education ==
Christian Louis Cooke was born on 15 September 1986 in Bradford, West Yorkshire. He has an older brother, Alexander, a younger sister, Gabrielle, and is a first cousin to Mel B from the Spice Girls through his mother, Di, who is sister to Mel's mother.

He attended St Mary's Catholic High School in Menston.

Cooke began his acting career at the age of 10 when he appeared in a production of Bedazzled at the Bingley Arts Centre. His first television appearance was in a commercial for Birds Eye beef burgers, shortly followed by his first lead role as Wilmot Tanner in Granada Television series Wilmot.

== Career ==
Cooke played the role of Luke Kirkwall from 2000 to 2006 in the ITV drama Where the Heart Is and guest starred in Doctors, Barking!, The Royal, Casualty & Inspector George Gently. In 2007, he starred in one episode of BBC's Robin Hood as Will Scarlett's younger brother Luke and made his film debut in the short film Wish.

Cooke also appeared in BBC One's The Chase and played Brae Marrack in the ITV1 soap opera Echo Beach. He guest-starred in the Doctor Who episodes "The Sontaran Stratagem" and "The Poison Sky", playing UNIT soldier Ross Jenkins, in 2008.

During 2009, he played the lead roles of Luke Rutherford in ITV1's supernatural drama Demons & Lord Dorian Gaudain in ITV2's eight-part drama Trinity, where he had several rear nude scenes in its first episode, and appeared in Syfy's television film Dark Relic the following year. He went on to play the lead role of Freddie Taylor in Cemetery Junction and starred in the critically acclaimed Channel 4 four-part drama The Promise, directed by Peter Kosminsky in 2011. That same year, Cooke made his directorial debut in Chandide, an independent short film based in London written & produced by Trinity co-star Arnab Chanda, who also starred in the lead role, before completing Paramount Pictures' romantic comedy Drunk Wedding. The following year, he featured in 1950s Miami-set drama series, Magic City, which came to a close after two seasons in August 2013.

Cooke's film career has since grown in the form of two collaborations with director Bryn Higgins, titled Unconditional and Electricity, starring alongside Charlie Cox in British independent Hello Carter, playing Mercutio in Carlo Carlei's Romeo and Juliet and starring alongside Lily Collins in British-American romantic comedy Love, Rosie. He also made a return to short films, starring in Nativity-inspired Anomaly before taking the lead in Fare with Maimie McCoy, and has since featured regularly throughout the second season of American television series Witches of East End before Lifetime announced the show's cancellation in November 2014.

Spring 2015 saw Cooke return to British television in BBC two-part book-adaptation drama Stonemouth, the first adaptation of Iain Banks' work since his death in 2013, opposite Sharon Small, Gary Lewis & Peter Mullan, as well as the announcement of Magic City's movie adaptation starring alongside Bruce Willis & Bill Murray, reprising his role as Danny Evans. On top of his return to British television, his role as Stewart Gilmour in Stonemouth marked his return to a lead role, and towards the summer of 2015 came the announcement of a return to directing with Peter Mullan & Michelle Fairley taking the lead roles in short film Edith; news that was followed by the release of Crackle original drama The Art of More, leading alongside Dennis Quaid & Kate Bosworth, where Cooke starred as ex-soldier Graham Connor.

The start of 2016 brought in a reunion with Hello Carter director Anthony Wilcox, starring alongside Example, for Instagram-exclusive Shield 5, the first short film to be distributed across this platform. A year later, and Cooke's career grows in the form of a role in the premiere theatre production of Experience by Dave Florez at Hampstead Theatre, appearing in Yaël Farber's production of Knives In Hens by David Harrower at the Donmar Warehouse and collaborating with Edith producers Sara Huxley & April Kelley to co-produce comedy series Annie Waits.

In April 2018 Cooke played the part of Mickey Argyll in Ordeal by Innocence, a role initially portrayed by Ed Westwick, who was replaced by Cooke amid allegations of sexual assault.

== Filmography ==
=== Television ===
List of acting performances in television
Title	Year	Role	Notes
Wilmot	1999	Wilmot Tanner	Main role
Where the Heart Is	2000–06	Luke Kirkwall	68 episodes
Casualty	2002	Mark Booth	"Only The Lonely"
Barking!	2004	Ryan	"The Big Sausage"
Doctors	2006	Gary	"Positively Blooming"
Casualty	2006	Jude Becket	"Sons & Lovers"
Inspector George Gently	2007	Billy Lister	"Gently Go Man"
The Chase	2007	Liam Higgins	9 episodes
The Royal	2007	Bobby Horrocks	"Starting Over"
Robin Hood	2007	Luke Scarlett	"The Angel of Death"
Echo Beach	2008	Brae Marrack	Main role
Moving Wallpaper	2008	Himself	3 episodes
Moving Wallpaper: The Mole	2008	Himself	Webisode; Episode 1.4
Doctor Who	2008	Ross Jenkins	"The Sontaran Stratagem", "The Poison Sky"
Demons	2009	Luke Rutherford-Van Helsing	Main role
Trinity	2009	Lord Dorian Gaudain	Main role
Dark Relic	2010	Paul	Television film
The Promise	2011	Sergeant Leonard Matthews	Miniseries
Magic City	2012–13	Danny Evans	Main role
Witches of East End	2014	Frederick Beauchamp	Main role; Season 2
Stonemouth	2015	Stewart Gilmour	Main role
The Art of More	2015–16	Graham Connor	Main role
Ordeal by Innocence	2018	Mickey Argyll	BBC Television film (Replacing Ed Westwick)
Barkskins	2020	Rene Sel	Main role
That Dirty Black Bag	2022	Steve	Main Role
Rematch	2024	Garry Kasparov	Main role
Frauds	2025	Deegs	4 episodes

=== Film ===
List of acting performances in film
Title	Year	Role	Notes
Wish	2007	Malcolm	Short film
Cemetery Junction	2010	Freddie Taylor	
Unconditional	2012	Liam	
Romeo & Juliet	2013	Mercutio	
Hello Carter	2013	Eliott	
Fare	2013	Dominic	Short film
Anomaly	2014	Oliver Grier	Short film
Electricity	2014	Mikey O'Connor	
Love, Rosie	2014	Greg	
Drunk Wedding	2015	John	
Shield 5	2016	John Swift	Short film-exclusive to Instagram
A Rose In Winter	2018	Michael Praeger	
Everything You Didn't Say	2018	Dylan	Short film
Point Blank	2019	Mateo Guevara	Netflix original film
Magic City	TBD	Danny Evans	
Plainclothes	2025	Ron	

=== Director ===
Title	Year	Notes
Chandide	2011	Short film
Edith	2016	Short film
Embers	2019	

=== Producer ===
Title	Year	Notes
Chandide	2011	Short film; Co-Producer
Edith	2016	Short film
Annie Waits	2017	Television; Co-Producer

=== Theatre ===
List of acting performances in theatre
Play	Year	Author	Role	Theatre	Notes
Experience	2017	Dave Florez	Dan	Hampstead Theatre	
Knives In Hens	2017	David Harrower	Pony William	Donmar Warehouse	Directed by Yael Farber
