= Electricity (film) =

- Directed by: Bryn Higgins
- Written by: Joe Fisher, Ray Robinson (novel; voice-over)
- Produced by: Clare Duggan; Bryn Higgins
- Starring: Agyness Deyn; Lenora Crichlow; Christian Cooke; Paul Anderson
- Cinematography: Si Bell
- Release dates: 14 October 2014 (London Film Festival); 12 December 2014
- Running time: 96 minutes
- Country: United Kingdom
- Language: English

Electricity is a 2014 British film directed by Bryn Higgins, starring Agyness Deyn, Lenora Crichlow and Christian Cooke. the film is about the journey seen through the eyes of a young woman with epilepsy. Electricity is an adaptation of the 2006 novel by Ray Robinson. It was produced in Saltburn-by-the-Sea in June 2013; some filming was carried out in London and in North East England. The film was released on 12 December 2014.

== Plot ==
Lily O'Connor, a Northerner with epilepsy, finds out her brother, who she had believed to be dead, may be alive. She leaves her safe, routine life and goes to London to find him. Epilepsy colours her perceptions and the film shows how she views everyday objects and places as obstacles and dangers.

== Cast ==
- Agyness Deyn as Lily O'Connor
- Christian Cooke as Mikey O'Connor
- Paul Anderson as Barry O'Connor
- Alice Lowe as Sylvia
- Lenora Crichlow as Mel
- Tom Georgeson as Al
- Ben Batt as Dave
- Millie Taylforth as Young Lily
- Jake Gibbons as Young Mikey
- Melissa Sinden as Sylvia's mother

== Reception ==
On review aggregator Rotten Tomatoes, the film holds an approval rating of 79% based on 19 reviews, with an average rating of 6.4/10.
