= Une grenade avec ça? =

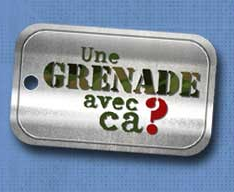
- TV show logo
- Created by: Martin Doyon; Charles Gaudreau; Jean Pelletier
- Starring: Catherine Proulx-Lemay; Michel Laperrière; Rose-Maïté Erkoreka; Marilyse Bourke; Éric Paulhus; Yan England; Caroline Gendron; Pierre Luc Houde
- Country of origin: Canada
- No. of seasons: 10
- No. of episodes: 272

Production
- Production locations: Montreal, Quebec
- Running time: 25 minutes

Original release
- Network: VRAK.TV
- Release: September 10, 2002 – December 20, 2011

Une grenade avec ça? (English: A grenade with that?) is a Québécois sitcom for teenagers produced by Zone 3 and aired on VRAK.TV. The name of the series comes from the popular grenade-shaped candies offered by the restaurant in the show. It is now the most watched show on VRAK.TV. The series debuted in 2002 and ended in 2011, after its tenth season. It is about the everyday trials and tribulations at Captain Creighton, a fictional Montreal fast-food restaurant.

Following recent charges of possession of child pornography and drug possession, episodes featuring actor Jean-François Harrisson have been pulled off the air as of March 6, 2009. He did not return to the cast for the following season and the role of Pat was written off replaced by Slamm portrayed by Pierre Luc Houde.

== Cast ==
Cast of Une grenade avec ça?. From left to right: Tché, Danny, Anais, Sonia, Darius, Ève and Pat. (2007)

- Michel Laperrière : Danny Pitre
- Catherine Proulx-Lemay : Anaïs Boutin
- Rose-Maïté Erkoreka : Ève Kaputchinsky
- Marilyse Bourke : Sonia Compagna
- Catherine Lachance : Nancy Désillet
- Eric Paulhus : Jonathan "Tché" Gouin
- Caroline Gendron: Marine Bellehumeur
- Pierre Luc Houde: Simon-Louis Auger-Moreau-Morissette "Slamm"
- Yan England : Darius Léveillé
- Gilbert Turp : Denis Pomerleau
- Jean-François Harrisson : Patrick "Pat" Béliveau (seasons 1–7)
- Patrick Chouinard : Jean-Régis "Golden" Cossette (seasons 2–3)
- Mathieu Grondin : Norbert "Norb" Gratton (seasons 1–3)
- Mélanie Maynard : Marie-Annette Cossette (seasons 2–4)
- Bobby Beshro : Julien-Christophe ("J.C.") (seasons 1–3, and 5)
- Marianne Fortier : Daphnée (season 7)
- Charles Gaudreau: Paul Duquette (seasons 1–3)
- Vincent Bolduc : Gilles Gendron Jr. (seasons 1–3)
- Hélène Major : Madame Leclerc (season 1–3)

== Characters ==
Anaïs Boutin: a really mean girl, whose dream is to be the next manager of the restaurant and she is able to do anything to accomplish her dreams. In fact, she wants to be a leader and have power over the others. She has worked with M. Pitre for about ten years and was one of his first employee and certainly his best employee. She learned by heart Creighton's booklet of rules and she has written her own version of it. A few years ago, she betrayed Captain Craighton and Danny when she worked for Denis Pomerleau, the manager of a restaurant named Bar B.Q. Joe but later she exploded it because she forgot to stop the gas. Later, M. Pomerleau made a new restaurant. but she was fired and returned with Danny. She is not appreciated by her colleagues, especially by Ève and Patrick. Anaïs and Pat hate each other since they were ten years old. They met for the first time in the same fast-food where they are working now. She became Tché's girlfriend for a short period of time, but he broke up because she loved him only for his money and because she was treating him like a real slave.

Danny Pitre: Manager of the Montreal Captain Creighton. He is addicted to root-beer. He went for the first time in this fast-food with his father when he was about 10. His father told him that one day, his son would become the new manager. The emotion was so intense for him that he vomited in his red cap. He works in Montreal's Captain Creighton since he was 17. He left school to work in the restaurant. He used to have a girlfriend named Nancy Désilets. He was working with her and his best friend, Denis Pomerleau. Danny was supposed to become the manager of the new branch of Captain Creighton in the suburbs of Montreal. He could not be happier: he was about to accomplish his dream and he fell in love with a girl who loved him. But his dream didn't come true. His boss gave the job to Denis that became Nancy's new boyfriend because she was interested by the power.

Ève Kaputchinsky: A vegetarian and a supporter of various pro-animal causes. She is a member of Équi-Eco (a group similar to PETA). Over the course of the show, her short temper became shorter and she could quickly become furious when people around her made or said things that were opposite to her social beliefs. She has been in couple with Norbert, even when he moved to California to study mathematics at Stanford University. They broke when he got back during one episode after they realized things were not the same between them. She then became Patrick's girlfriend until they realized they had a few things in common.

Sonia Compagna: A recording artist who's still far from the ranks of being a popstar. She can be naive and get highly enjoyed when things turn in her favor. She is an avid fan of Céline Dion. Her ex-boyfriend JiCi not only left her, but stated in her contract for her first album that all money from the album goes to him.

Jonathan Gouin, a.k.a. "Tché": An heir to the Pain Gouin bakery empire. His company is so rich because their bread are considered to be the mellowest on Earth. He went out with Anaïs, but later broke up with her. He also briefly went out with Sonia. He and Pat are best friends. He is clever and like Norbert has a tendency to solve the problems and situations occurring during the show.

Darius Léveillé: An eccentric, with a lot of tattoos and crazy hair. He once had a rat named Löthar but it died. Darius is known for eating weird combinations of foods, like fruits and spaghetti—and even burgers and yogurt, which he once actually put on the Captain Creighton menu. He has weird interests in life. He loves to do X-treme yoga, spiritual tai chi, and aquafitness.

Sarah and Sandra McCormick: Little is known about them because they almost never go to work. Although often mentioned by other characters and considered part of the Captain Creighton staff, they were never shown on-screen. Their excuses for not attending work are a running gag on the show.

Marine Bellehumeur: A fairly new employee who dreams of becoming a fashion designer. She is always well dressed but always worries about how she looks and how much money she has.

Simon-Louis Auger-Moreau-Morissette "Slamm" : A very athletic and very handsome new employee who has many girls looking his way but he is too attached to sports to give them attention. He and Marine came in the same season.

Nancy Désilets: Danny's past lover now married to his worst enemy, Denis Pomerleau. She is highly superficial and the only thing she cares about with a man is his power. Her niece, Patty Désilets, worked for the restaurant briefly in one episode where the only reason she got hired by M. Pitre was because she claimed to be the niece of Nancy Désilets. Her niece was really rude and mean with the others until she resigned.

=== Past Characters ===
Patrick "Pat" Béliveau: Ève's ex-boyfriend—and avid girlwatcher. He and Anaïs are childhood enemies. He was a part time photographer and started working at the restaurant with his best friend, Norbert Gratton, at the beginning of the show.

Norbert Gratton: He was Pat's best friend, he is smart and aims to be a famous mathematician. He and Ève were going out until he left for California. They broke up when Norbert came back for one episode after they realized things were not the same between them. A pragmatic individual, he was quiet and didn't easily get into other's fantasising, habitually explaining or proving to the others what was wrong. Anaïs once qualified his dream to calculate the decimals of Pi as a really nerdy thing, which annoyed him.

Jean-Régis "Golden" Cossette: A former member of the Captain Creighton staff. He is highly naive, very slow to understand and often awkward. He is Marie-Anette's brother. His job at the restaurant was mainly to clean the restaurant, something he took very seriously. His dream was to become a police officer. He met his girlfriend, Monelle, in one episode where she acted as a tough security guard for the restaurant. She was eventually fired in the same episode by Anaïs, which led Jean-Régis to resign from his job to pursue his relationship with his new girlfriend.

Marie-Anette Cossette: Jean-Régis's sister who was also part of the Captain Creighton staff during a few episodes. She could be stubborn at time and like her brother she was dimwitted, albeit not has as much as him. She had openly expressed strong love feelings about M. Pitre, which of course didn't show the same feelings toward her and was rather annoyed by her love claims.

== About Captain Creighton ==
Captain Creighton is a fictional American worldwide chain of fast-food restaurants founded in 1965 by a US Army captain, Ben Creighton. Headquartered in Atlanta, Georgia, the chain has 1548 locations in 38 countries, including Canadian branches in Montreal and Calgary.

== See also ==
- Fries with That? (YTV series based on Une grenade avec ça?)
