= Ray Robinson (novelist) =

British novelist, screenwriter and musician

Ray Robinson (born 1971 in Bedale, North Yorkshire) is a British novelist, screenwriter and musician.

== Career ==
Robinson is a graduate of Liverpool School of Art, where he studied graphic design. He was awarded a PhD in Creative Writing from Lancaster University in 2006.

His debut novel Electricity was shortlisted for both the James Tait Black Memorial Prize and the Authors' Club Best First Novel Award. The screen adaptation of Electricity premiered at the BFI London Film Festival 2014, starring Agyness Deyn. The film won Best Screenplay at the inaugural National Film Awards in 2015.

His other novels are The Man Without (2008), Forgetting Zoë (2010), Jawbone Lake (2013), The Mating Habits of Stags (2019) and Super 8 Dream (2026). Forgetting Zoë was a winner of the inaugural Jerwood Fiction Uncovered Prize and The Mating Habits of Stags was shortlisted for the Portico Prize. Robinson was hailed as "among the most impressive voices of Britain's younger generation" by the Irish Times.

As a screenwriter, he co-authored the documentary film Dream Town, examining a decaying Russian coal mining town on the Norwegian island of Svalbard. The film won Best Picture at the Chicago Underground Film Festival. In 2016 he wrote the multi-award-winning, BAFTA-longlisted short film Edith, starring Peter Mullan and Michelle Fairley, which was also longlisted at the British Independent Film Awards. The Mating Habits of Stags is based on the film.

Robinson (under the alias "Wodwo") is also a guitarist, composer & sound artist, and has produced musical scores for film, video games, theatre and dance. His music varies from minimal loop-based microsound and lowercase, to neoclassical, experimental drone and ambient.
