= Insurge Pictures =

American defunct film studio

- Type: Label
- Industry: Motion pictures
- Founded: July 8, 2010; 16 years ago
- Defunct: August 1, 2015; 11 years ago
- Fate: Absorbed into its parent studio
- Successor: Paramount Pictures
- Headquarters: Los Angeles, California, United States
- Area served: Worldwide
- Products: Film distribution; Film production
- Owner: Paramount Skydance Corporation
- Parent: Paramount Pictures

Insurge Pictures was an American production company that was the specialty label belonging to the American film studio Paramount Pictures. It focused on micro-budget films.

== Beginnings ==
In March 2010, it was announced that Paramount Pictures would launch a new division named Insurge Pictures, which would produce micro-budget films based on Paramount's success with the micro-budget Paranormal Activity. The first film produced by Paramount Insurge was Never Say Never (2011), a documentary film featuring Justin Bieber. Prior to the release of the film, Insurge released "Grease: The Sing-A-Long" in 2010, which had a limited release.

In 2011, it was announced that Insurge wrapped an at the time untitled project about a destination wedding. The film, which was released on May 22, 2015, was eventually titled Drunk Wedding and was shelved for years prior to the release. In January 2011, it was announced Insurge was releasing The Devil Inside.

In 2012, Insurge released The Loved Ones, and Katy Perry: Part of Me. Insurge also produced a mockumentary reality series, Burning Love, which was re-adapted in 2013 into a regular series for E!. In 2015, it was announced that Insurge would be releasing Area 51 and Drunk Wedding on May 15, and May 22, 2015, in a limited release exclusively at Drafthouse Theaters and through video on demand providers. Both projects were shelved prior to their releases.

In May 2015, President Amy Powell was stripped of responsibility for the division, with Insurge being transferred as a label within Paramount and its staff absorbed into its feature film team, reporting to recently appointed Paramount Motion Pictures Group President Marc Evans.

== Films ==
Release date	Title	Co-produced with	Distributor	Budget	Box-office Gross
July 8, 2010	Grease Sing-A-Long	RSO Records	Paramount Pictures	$6 million	$395 million
February 11, 2011	Justin Bieber: Never Say Never	MTV Films, Scooter Braun Films, L.A. Reid Media, AEG Live, and Island Def Jam Music Group	Paramount Pictures	$13 million	$99 million
January 6, 2012	The Devil Inside	Prototype	Paramount Pictures	$1 million	$101.8 million
June 1, 2012	The Loved Ones	Omnilab Media, Ambience Entertainment, and Film Victoria	Paramount Pictures	$4 million	$254,170
July 5, 2012	Katy Perry: Part of Me	MTV Films, Imagine Entertainment, AEG Live, EMI Music, Perry Productions, Pulse Films, Magical Elves Productions, and Splinter Films	Paramount Pictures	$13 million	$32.7 million
January 30, 2015	Project Almanac	MTV Films and Platinum Dunes	Paramount Pictures	$12 million	$33.2 million
May 15, 2015	Area 51	Aramid Entertainment Fund, Blumhouse Productions, IM Global, Incentive Filmed Entertainment, and Room 101	Paramount Pictures	$5 million	$7,556
May 22, 2015	Drunk Wedding	Weston Pictures	Paramount Pictures	$600,000	$3,301
July 31, 2015	Staten Island Summer	Michaels-Goldwyn	Paramount Pictures	N/A	
August 1, 2016	Zoolander: Super Model	Augenblick Studios, and Red Hour Productions	CBS All Access	N/A	
September 9, 2016	Brother Nature	Broadway Video	Samuel Goldwyn Films	N/A	
