= Yan England =

Canadian actor and television presenter

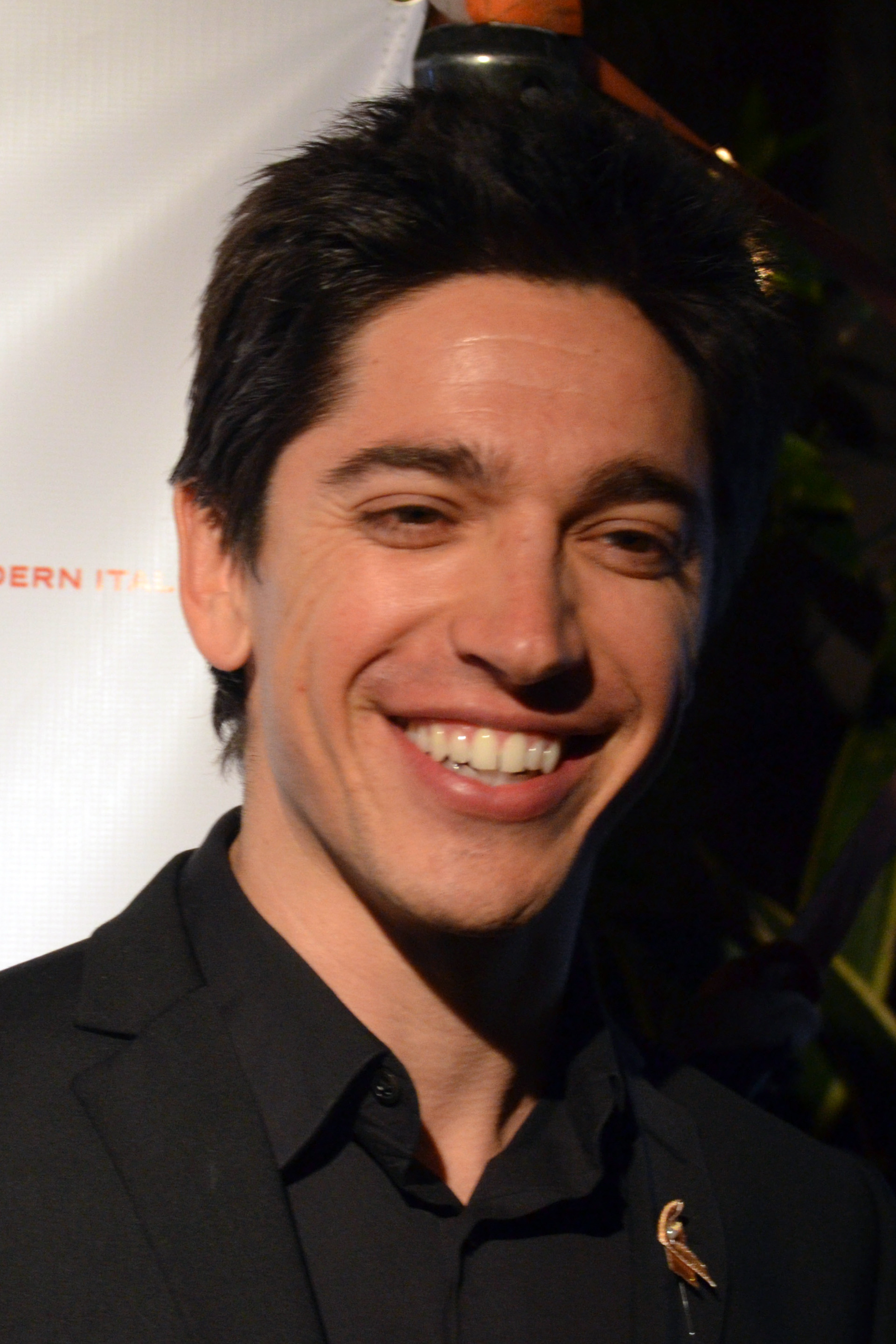
- Yan England at Beverly Hills, Los Angeles in 2013
- Born: Yan England-Girard; 9 December 1981 (age 44); Mont-Saint-Hilaire, Quebec, Canada
- Occupations: Actor; Television / radio presenter Screenwriter; Film producer Film director
- Years active: 1990–present
- Notable work: Une Grenade Avec Ça /Henry; Les Rescapés; Yamaska; Providence; Buffy the Vampire Slayer; Minuit, le soir Watatatow
- Height: 1.80 m (5 ft 11 in)
- Parent(s): Michel Girard; Diane England
- Awards: Prix Gémeaux, best Presentation for a Youth series Fan club (2012); Prix Artis, best supporting role in a youth series in Une grenade avec ça? (2011)

Yan England-Girard (born 9 December 1981) is a Canadian actor, television and radio presenter, screenwriter, film producer and director of short films. From the age of eight, he was known for his role of Einstein in the youth program Watatatow during 13 years.

His short film Henry was nominated for an Oscar at the 85th Academy Awards ceremony in the "Best Live Action Short Film" category. 1:54 is his debut long feature film.

== Biography ==
Born in Mont-Saint-Hilaire, Quebec, Yan England is the son of Michel Girard, economic journalist and Diane England, producer at Zone 3 media group.

Since the age of eight, England has participated in several television series and youth-oriented programs, including Les Débrouillards, Watatatow, Headquarters: Warsaw and Buffy the Vampire Slayer. At the age of eighteen, he moved to Beverly Hills for five years where he studied theatre to get rid of his French accent.

He worked simultaneously in several television series and in August 2013, he became the new morning man at CKOI-FM. On January 10, 2013, one of his films, Henry, was nominated for an Academy Award. The short film of 21 minutes in the "Best Live Action Short Film" category.

== Filmography ==
=== Cinema ===
- 2000: Life After Love (La vie après l'amour): Bob Miron
- 2003: I Witness: Jud
- 2003: July First, the Film (Premier juillet, le film')': Nick
- 2015: Le Dep: Jérôme
- 2015: Stonewall: Terry

=== Television ===
- 1991: Watatatow: Einstein
- 1993: Ent'Cadieux: Marc-André
- 1998: La Part des anges: Karim
- 1999-2002: Les Débrouillards: Yan
- 1999: Opération Tango
- 1999: Headquarters: Warsaw: Joshua
- 2000: Haute Surveillance: Maxime Lamarre
- 2001: Ayoye!: Kenneth De Grandpré
- 2002: Buffy the Vampire Slayer: O'Donnell (1 episode)
- 2003-2006: Ramdam: Antoine Laurin
- 2004: Naked Josh: Josh
- 2004: Family Misgivings: Frank
- 2005: Annie et ses hommes: Max (1 episode)
- 2005-2011: Providence: Syd
- 2005: Why George: Zach
- 2005-2011: Une grenade avec ça?: Darius Léveillé
- 2006: Getting Along Famously: Randy Ramone
- 2006: 15/Love: Lucas (2 episodes)
- 2006-2008: Minuit, le soir: Tom
- 2007-2008: Les Soeurs Elliot: David Cohen
- 2008- : Fan club: presenter
- 2009- : Trauma: Étienne Labrie
- 2009- : Yamaska : Brian Harrison
- 2009: Bakugan Battle Brawlers: Baron Letloy (voice)
- 2010: KARV, l'anti.gala: co-presenter
- 2010 - 2012: Les Rescapés: Viateur Bolduc
- 2012: KARV, l'anti.gala: presenter
- 2013: House of Versace: Michael
- 2013-2016: L'appart du 5e: Théophile "Théo" Langevin

== Director ==
- 2007: Moi (also producer and screenwriter)
- 2011: Henry (also producer and screenwriter)
- 2016: 1:54 (also screenwriter)
- 2021: Sam
- 2024: Rematch (also screenwriter)
- 2025: Fanny

== Awards ==
- 2013: Nominated for the Academy Award for Best Live Action Short Film for Henry.
- 2012: Prix Gémeaux winner for Best Presentation for a Youth series Fan club.
- 2011: Prix Artis winner for best supporting role in a youth series in Une grenade avec ça?.
- 2024: Series Mania Grand Prix for Rematch.
