= Dear Criminals =

Dear Criminals are a Canadian electronic music group from Montreal, Quebec, consisting of Frannie Holder, Vincent Legault and Charles Lavoie. They are most noted as the winners of the Prix Iris for Best Original Music at the 19th Quebec Cinema Awards in 2017 for their work on the 2016 film Nelly.

Holder and Legault formed the band as a side project from their work as members of Random Recipe, initially to work on composing music for film, theatre and dance projects. Lavoie, formerly of Lack of Sleep and Betalovers, joined as a second vocalist alongside Holder. They have described their sound as a mixture of "electro-porn" and "haunted folk".

Around the same time as Nelly, they also composed music for the television series Fatale-Station, as well as for stage shows. In addition to their composing work, the band have released a number of albums and EPs, beginning with Weapons in 2013, and have performed live concerts in collaboration with orchestras and choirs.

The band members have also done composing work as individuals outside of the band. Holder's credits include the films Pompei, Noemie Says Yes (Noémit dit oui), North of Albany (Au nord d'Albany), 7 Beats per Minute and Where the River Begins (Donde comenzia el rio), while Lavoie received a Prix Iris nomination for Best Original Music at the 26th Quebec Cinema Awards in 2024 for the film Solo.

== Discography ==
- Weapons - 2013
- Crave - 2014
- WOMAN - 2014
- Strip - 2015
- Another Picture - 2016
- Live (avec le Choeur JFP) - 2016
- Nelly - 2017
- Fatale - 2017
- Lullaby - 2018
- Live avec orchestre de chambre - 2020
