= Drunk Wedding =

2015 American film by Nick Weiss

- Directed by: Nick Weiss
- Written by: Anthony Weiss; Nick Weiss
- Produced by: Couper Samuelson
- Starring: Nick P. Ross; J. R. Ramirez; Christian Cooke; Bethany Dwyer; Dan Gill; Victoria Gold
- Cinematography: Frederick Schroeder
- Edited by: Michel Aller; Daniel S. Russ
- Music by: Nathan Matthew David
- Production company: Weston Pictures
- Distributed by: Paramount Pictures; Insurge Pictures
- Release date: May 22, 2015
- Running time: 81 minutes
- Country: United States
- Language: English
- Budget: $600,000
- Box office: $3,301

Drunk Wedding is a 2015 American comedy film directed by Nick Weiss and written by Anthony Weiss and Nick Weiss. The film stars Nick P. Ross, J. R. Ramirez, Christian Cooke, Bethany Dwyer, Dan Gill and Victoria Gold. The film was released on May 22, 2015, by Paramount Pictures.

== Cast ==
- Nick P. Ross as Linc
- J. R. Ramirez as Cal
- Christian Cooke as John
- Bethany Dwyer as Maggie
- Dan Gill as Phil
- Victoria Gold as Elissa
- Anne Gregory as Daphne
- Genevieve Jones as Sarah
- Nate Lang as Ivan
- Carlos Lugo as Porter
- Gabriela Revilla Lugo as Wedding Planner
- Diana Newton as Tammy
- Corbett Tuck as Gloria

== Production ==
The film was directed and co-written by Nick Weiss, with Anthony Weiss as co-screenwriter. Music was by Nathan Matthew David.

== Release ==
The film was released at 16 Alamo Drafthouse theaters on May 22, 2015, alongside VOD and digital download.
