= Saint-Cyprien-de-Napierville =

- Municipality
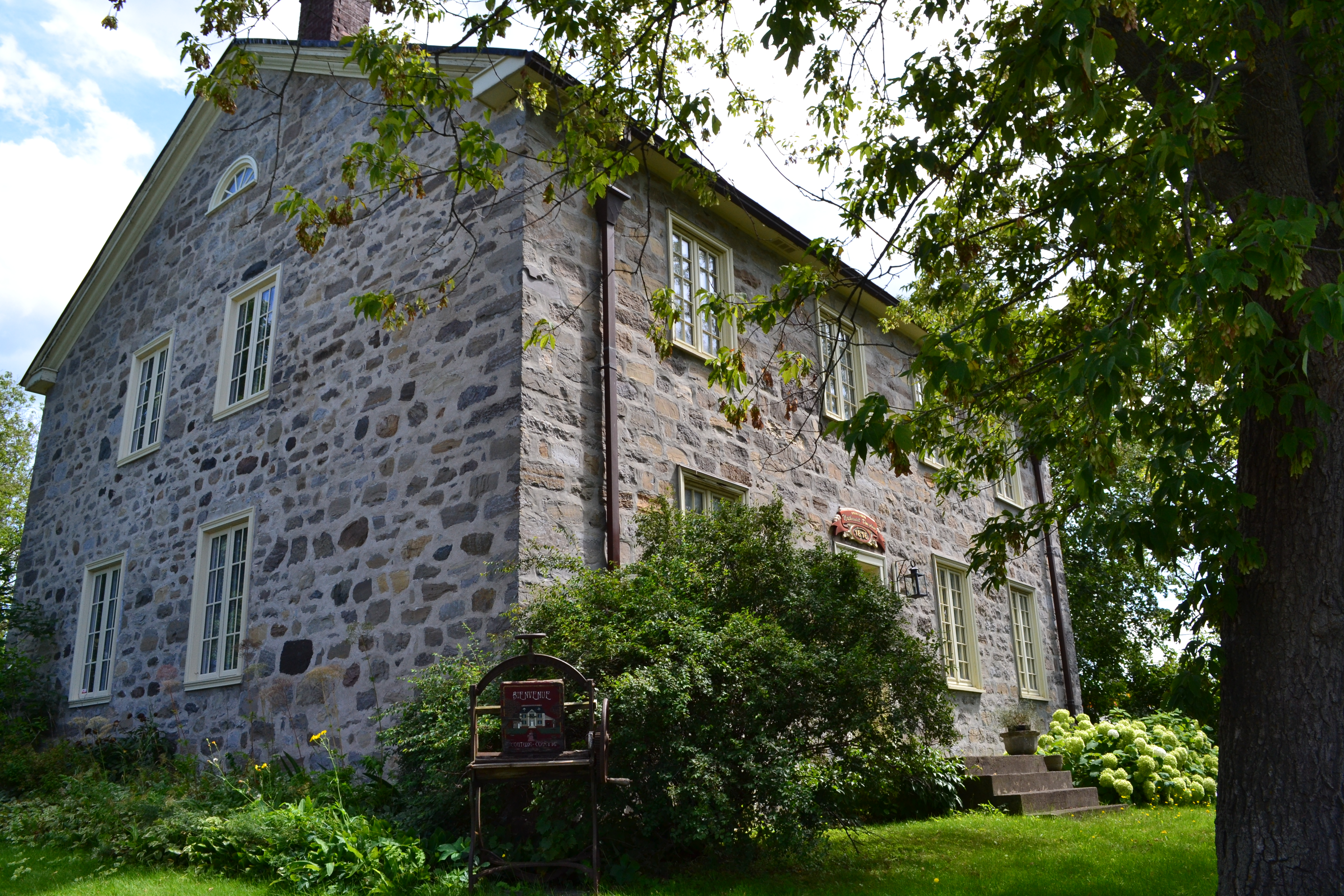

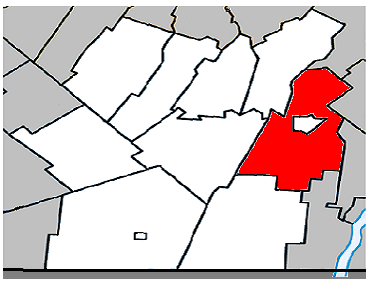
- Location within Les Jardins-de-Napierville RCM

- Location in southern Quebec
- Coordinates: 45°11′N 73°25′W
- Country: Canada
- Province: Quebec
- Region: Montérégie
- RCM: Les Jardins-de-Napierville
- Constituted: July 1, 1855

Government
  - Mayor: Jean-Marie Mercier
  - Federal riding: Châteauguay—Lacolle
  - Prov. riding: Huntingdon

Area
  - Total: 97.96 km^{2} (37.82 sq mi)
  - Land: 97.75 km^{2} (37.74 sq mi)

Population (2021)
  - Total: 1,735
  - Density: 17.7/km^{2} (46/sq mi)
  - Pop 2016-2021: ▼10%
  - Dwellings: 717
- Time zone: UTC−5 (EST)
  - Summer (DST): UTC−4 (EDT)
- Postal code(s): J0J 1L0
- Area codes: 450 and 579
- Highways A-15: R-217 R-219 R-221
- Website: www.st-cypriendenapierville.ca

Saint-Cyprien-de-Napierville (French pronunciation: [sɛ̃ sipʁijɛ̃ də napjɛʁvil]) is a municipality in Les Jardins-de-Napierville Regional County Municipality in Quebec, Canada, situated in the Montérégie administrative region. The population as of the 2021 Canadian census was 1,735. It completely encircles the village of Napierville.

== Demographics ==
=== Population ===
Canada census – Saint-Cyprien-de-Napierville community profile

	2021	2016	2011
Population	1,735 (-10.0% from 2016)	1,927 (+3.1% from 2011)	1,869 (+19.0% from 2006)
Land area	97.75 km^{2} (37.74 sq mi)	97.45 km^{2} (37.63 sq mi)	97.10 km^{2} (37.49 sq mi)
Population density	17.7/km^{2} (46/sq mi)	19.8/km^{2} (51/sq mi)	19.2/km^{2} (50/sq mi)
Median age	42.8 (M: 42.4, F: 42.8)	40.9 (M: 41.3, F: 40.4)	39.3 (M: 39.2, F: 39.4)
Private dwellings	717 (total) 681 (occupied)	762 (total)	707 (total)
Median household income	$87,000	$72,192	$54,668

References: 2021 2016 2011

Historical Census Data - Saint-Cyprien-de-Napierville, Quebec

Year	Pop.	±%
1861	4,579	—
1871	3,273	−28.5%
1881	1,887	−42.3%
1891	1,703	−9.8%
1901	1,421	−16.6%
1911	1,063	−25.2%
1921	1,165	+9.6%
1931	955	−18.0%

Year	Pop.	±%
1941	978	+2.4%
1951	955	−2.4%
1956	1,054	+10.4%
1961	1,087	+3.1%
1966	918	−15.5%
1971	953	+3.8%
1976	981	+2.9%
1981	1,115	+13.7%

Year	Pop.	±%
1986	1,154	+3.5%
1991	1,237	+7.2%
1996	1,307	+5.7%
2001	1,312	+0.4%
2006	1,570	+19.7%
2011	1,869	+19.0%
2016	1,927	+3.1%
2021	1,735	−10.0%

Source: Statistics Canada

=== Language ===
Canada Census Mother Tongue - Saint-Cyprien-de-Napierville, Quebec
Census	Total	French			English			French & English			Other		
Year	Responses	Count	Trend	Pop %	Count	Trend	Pop %	Count	Trend	Pop %	Count	Trend	Pop %
2021	1,735	1,615	▼11.5%	93.1%	75	▲15.4%	4.3%	20	▲300.0%	1.2%	30	▲20.0%	1.7%
2016	1,925	1,825	▲4.0%	94.8%	65	0.0%	3.4%	5	▼75.0%	0.3%	25	▼16.7%	1.3%
2011	1,870	1,755	▲15.1%	93.9%	65	▲225.0%	3.5%	20	0.0%	1.1%	30	▲100.0%	1.6%
2006	1,575	1,525	▲25.0%	96.8%	20	▼50.0%	1.3%	15	▼40.0%	1.0%	15	▼50.0%	1.0%
2001	1,315	1,220	▼2.0%	92.8%	40	▼20.0%	3.0%	25	▲25.0%	1.9%	30	▲200.0%	2.3%
1996	1,325	1,245	n/a	94.0%	50	n/a	3.8%	20	n/a	1.5%	10	n/a	0.8%

== Attractions ==
- Fromagerie le Métayer (Cheesemaker)
- Douglass Cemetery
- Nathaniel Douglass House

== See also ==
- List of municipalities in Quebec
