= Fan Club (TV series) =

Fan Club is a Quebec television series broadcast on the specialized VRAK.TV youth channel.

The program launched on 28 August 2008, an artistic magazine program allowing youth to have access to their favourite celebrities for a typical day. The star usually gives a snap of his life as a celebrity and offers gifts and special favors to the winning "fan".

For three seasons 2008 to 2010, the program was hosted by Yan England (who has also hosted series like Une grenade avec ça and Ramdam) and Magalie Lépine-Blondeau (R-Force). In the 4th season in 2011, Caroline Gendron (from Une grenade avec ça?) replaced Magalie Lépine-Blondeau, whereas Yan England stayed for a 4th season.

The program also featured a special segment "club sandwich" in which a selected star is challenged to consume a "specially prepared" sandwich of various ingredients. This segment was prepared by Jérémy Rodriguez-Carignan and Julien Adam for 3 seasons. In the fourth season (2011), the segment was hosted by Camille Felton and Antoine Blais.

== Featured celebrities ==
Season 1 (2008-2009)

1. Guy Jodoin
2. Jay Du Temple
3. Messmer
4. Debbie Lynch-White
5. Alice Morel-Michaud
6. Anne Casabonne
7. Sylvie Boucher
8. Yves Hébert
9. Alexe Gaudreault
10. Annie-Soleil Proteau
11. Philippe Laprise
12. Julie Snyder
13. Garou
14. Mariloup Wolfe
15. Stéphane Bellavance
16. Joël Legendre
17. Sophie Cadieux
18. Jean-François Baril
19. Annie Villeneuve
20. Benoit Gagnon
21. Frank vs Girard
22. Claude Legault
23. Gildor Roy
24. Sylvie Moreau
25. Réal Béland
26. Alexandre Morais
27. Pierre Brassard
28. Patrice L'Écuyer
29. Le Père Noël
30. Véronique Cloutier
31. Mathieu Gaudet
32. Éric Salvail
33. Émily Bégin
34. Bruno Blanchet
35. Jonathan Painchaud
36. Chéli
37. Antoine Mongrain
38. Prof d'école
39. Marianne Moisan
40. Alex Perron
41. Michel Laperrière
42. Dominic Philie
43. Ricardo Larrivée
44. Herby Moreau
45. Roxanne Boulianne
46. Stéphane Crête
47. Sébastien Benoît
48. Michel Bergeron
49. François-Xavier Dufour
50. Stéphane Archambault
51. Réal Béland
52. Julien et Jérémy
53. Épisode 42

Season 2 (2009-2010)

1. Roxanne Boulianne
2. Antoine Mongrain
3. Jean Leloup
4. Les Trois Accords
5. Stéphane Fallu
6. Annie Dufresne
7. Julien Poulin
8. Alexandre Barrette
9. Koriass
10. Xavier Morin-Lefort
11. Mario Jean
12. Virginie Coossa
13. David Jalbert
14. Guillaume Lemay-Thivierge
15. Ima
16. Dumas
17. Louis Morissette
18. Cathy Gauthier
19. Patrick Groulx
20. Gildor Roy
21. Marc Gagnon
22. François Arnaud
23. Boom Desjardins
24. Antoine L'Écuyer
25. Rémi-Pierre Paquin
26. Annie Brocoli
27. Joël Bouchard
28. Bruno Marcil
29. Jocelyn Blanchard
30. Les Justiciers Masqués
31. Steve Veilleux
32. Billy Tellier
33. Stefie Shock
34. Martin Brouillard
35. Mirianne Brûlé
36. Gino Chouinard
37. Dominic Paquet
38. Dominic Arpin
39. Mike Ward

Season 3 (2010-2011)

1. Claude Poirier
2. Sébastien Buemi
3. Marie-Mai
4. K.Maro
5. François Arnaud
6. Hugo Girard
7. Stéphanie Crête-Blais
8. Jonas Brothers
9. Duke Squad
10. Joannie Rochette
11. Sophie Vaillancourt
12. Eric Paulhus
13. Annie Larouche
14. Les Grandes Gueules
15. Hélène Florent
16. Épisode 16
17. Down with Webster
18. Christmas special with Rachid Badouri
19. Christmas special with Gregory Charles
20. Chantal Machabée
21. Aliocha Schneider
22. Bobby Bazini
23. Marie-Mai
24. Justin Bieber
25. Joey Scarpellino
26. Éric Lapointe
27. Tournoi de hockey Pee-Wee de Québec (2011)
28. Le Banquier (Julie Snyder & Marie-Pier Morin)
29. Jean-Philippe Leguellec
30. Mathieu Lavallée
31. Marc Hervieux
32. Laurent Paquin
33. Pascal Morrissette
34. Stéphane Bellavance
35. Véronique Cloutier
36. Pier-Luc Funk
37. Roxanne Boulianne
38. Nico Archambault

Season 4 (2011-2012)

1. Marie-Soleil Dion
2. Kaïn
3. Bianca Gervais
4. Kim St-Pierre and Caroline Ouellette
5. Pierre Hébert
6. Marie-Claude Savard
7. Claude Meunier
8. Davy Boisvert
9. William Deslauriers
10. Alexandre Morais
11. Frédérique Dufort
12. Émilie Heymans and Jennifer Abel
13. Joannie Rochette
14. Maxime Landry and Jacob
15. Ron Fournier
16. Spécial Grenade
17. Christmas special with Selena Gomez
18. New Year special
19. Alexandre Barrette
20. Vincent C
21. Julie St-Pierre
22. Valentine special with Cody Simpson
23. Emmy of Mixmania2
24. Johanne Léveillée
25. Vincent Vallières
26. Tammy Verge
27. Catherine Brunet
28. Lars Eller
29. Lise Dion
30. Sophie Cadieux
31. Théâtre Denise-Pelletier (Éric Paulhus)
32. Jean-Michel Anctil
33. Anne Dorval
34. The Wanted
35. Billy Tellier
