= Sam (2021 film) =

2021 Canadian film

- Directed by: Yan England
- Written by: Yan England; André Gulluni
- Produced by: Denise Robert; Diane England
- Starring: Antoine-Olivier Pilon; Mylène Mackay; Stéphane Rousseau; Milya Corbeil Gauvreau
- Cinematography: Jérôme Sabourin
- Edited by: Benjamin Duffield
- Music by: Raphael Reed
- Production company: Cinémaginaire
- Distributed by: Les Films Séville
- Release date: July 26, 2021
- Running time: 94 minutes
- Country: Canada
- Language: French

Sam is a Canadian sports drama film, directed by Yan England and released in 2021. The film stars Antoine-Olivier Pilon as Sam, a competitive swimmer who aspires to compete in the Olympic Games, but who is confronted with a momentous event that forces him to reevaluate his life.

The cast also includes Mylène Mackay as Sam's older sister and swim coach Judith, Milya Corbeil Gauvreau as Océane and Stéphane Rousseau as Marc, as well as Pierre-Yves Cardinal, Marie-France Marcotte, Catherine Sénart, Simon-Daniel Boisvert, Julie Beauchemin and Lévi Doré in supporting roles.

The film premiered on July 26, 2021.

== Critical reception ==
Alex Rose of Cult MTL negatively reviewed the film, calling it "a hysterically overwrought drama disguised as a sports film" and comparing it negatively to Pascal Plante's similarly themed 2020 film Nadia, Butterfly. He wrote that "Sam’s distributor has asked the press not to reveal any spoilers about the film, which makes discussing it nearly impossible; suffice to say that Sam is the kind of film where you see preposterous twists and coincidences coming early on and hope against all hope that your predictions don’t come true. Reader: they all did."

Felix Lajoie from le Soleil gave it four starts. "In the long run, the intrigue flows into a frantic rhythm. No pause to fall asleep with endless dialogues. Yan England (1:54) said he wanted to produce a story that keeps the spectator on the edge of his seat. We can say that it is successful."
