= Henry (2011 film) =

2012 short film directed by Yan England

- Film poster
- Directed by: Yan England
- Written by: Yan England
- Produced by: Yan England
- Starring: Gérard Poirier; Louise Laprade; Marie Tifo
- Cinematography: Claudine Sauvé
- Edited by: Philippe Gagnon
- Distributed by: ShortsHD
- Release date: August 9, 2011 (Rhode Island)
- Running time: 21 minutes
- Country: Canada
- Language: French

Henry is a 2011 Canadian short drama film written, produced, and directed by Yan England. The film stars Gérard Poirier as Henry, an elderly retired concert pianist who is beginning to suffer the effects of Alzheimer's disease.

The film premiered at the 2011 Rhode Island International Film Festival. The film received a nomination for the 2013 Academy Award for Best Live Action Short Film. After being nominated for an Academy Award, the film was released along with all the other 15 Oscar-nominated short films in theaters by ShortsHD.

== Cast ==
- Gérard Poirier as Henry
- Louise Laprade as Maria
- Marie Tifo as Nathalie
- Hubert Lemire as Young Henry
- Ariane-Li Simard-Côté as Young Maria
