= List of LGBTQ-related films of 2022 =

This is a list of lesbian, gay, bisexual, transgender or queer-related films released in 2022. It contains theatrically released films that deal with important gay, lesbian, bisexual, transgender or queer characters or issues and may have same-sex romance or relationships as a plot device.

== Films ==
Title	Director	Country	Genre	Cast	Notes	Ref
1946: The Mistranslation That Shifted Culture	Sharon ‘Rocky’ Roggio	United States	Documentary			
Alis	Clare Weiskopf	Colombia, Chile, Romania	Documentary			
All Man: The International Male Story	Bryan Darling, Jesse Finley Reed	United States	Documentary			
All Was Good (Sab changa si)	Teresa A. Braggs	India	Documentary			
Am I Ok?	Tig Notaro, Stephanie Allynne	United States	Drama	Dakota Johnson, Sonoya Mizuno, Jermaine Fowler		
Attachment	Gabriel Bier Gislason	Denmark	Comedy, thriller			
Badhaai Do (Felicitations Due)	Harshavardhan Kulkarni	India	Comedy drama	Rajkummar Rao and Bhumi Pednekar		
Beautiful Beings (Berdreymi)	Guðmundur Arnar Guðmundsson	Iceland	Drama			
The Bed	Thalia Kent-Egan	United Kingdom	Short drama			
Before I Change My Mind	Trevor Anderson	Canada	Drama	Vaughn Murrae, Dominic Lippa, Lacey Oake		
Blond Night (Nuit blonde)	Gabrielle Demers	Canada	Short drama	Patrick Dorneval, Dany Boudreault		
Blue Jean	Georgia Oakley	United Kingdom	Drama	Rosy McEwen, Kerrie Hayes		
Bones and All	Luca Guadagnino	United States, Italy	Romantic horror	Taylor Russell and Timothée Chalamet		
Boylesque	Bogna Kowalczyk	Poland, Czech Republic	Documentary	Andrzej "Lulla La Polaca" Szwan		
Brainwashed: Sex-Camera-Power	Nina Menkes	United States	Documentary			
Breaking the Ice	Clara Stern	Austria	Sports, romantic drama			
Breathe	Harm van der Sanden	Netherlands	Short drama			
Bros	Nicholas Stoller	United States	Romantic comedy	Billy Eichner, Luke Macfarlane, Jim Rash, Harvey Fierstein		
Burning Days (Kurak Günler)	Emin Alper	Turkey, France	Drama	Selahattin Paşalı, Ekin Koç		
Casa Susanna	Sébastien Lifshitz	France, United States	Documentary			
Close	Lukas Dhont	Belgium, Netherlands, France	Drama			
Compulsus	Tara Thorne	Canada	Thriller			
Concerned Citizen	Idan Haguel	Israel	Drama			
Continental Drift (South) (La dérive des continents au sud)	Lionel Baier	Switzerland, France	Comedy-drama	Isabelle Carré, Théodore Pellerin, Ursina Lardi		
Crush	Sammi Cohen	United States	Coming of age	Rowan Blanchard, Auliʻi Cravalho, Isabella Ferreira		
Dino at the Beach	Josh Cox	United States	Short romantic LGBT drama	Mateo Correa, Devon McDowell		
Dipped in Black (Marungka tjalatjunu)	Matthew Thorne, Derik Lynch	Australia	Short documentary	Derik Lynch		
Do Revenge	Jennifer Kaytin Robinson	United States	Teen, black comedy	Camila Mendes, Maya Hawke		
Dogfriend (Hundefreund)	Maissa Lihedheb	Germany	Short drama			
Downton Abbey: A New Era	Julian Fellowes	United Kingdom	Drama	Nathalie Baye, Hugh Bonneville, Maggie Smith, Imelda Staunton, Dominic West		
Dreaming Walls	Amélie van Elmbt, Maya Duverdier	Belgium, France, United States, Netherlands, Sweden	Documentary			
The Dreamlife of Georgie Stone	Maya Newell	Australia	Short documentary			
Everything Everywhere All at Once	Dan Kwan and Daniel Scheinert	United States	Sci-fi absurdist comedy-drama	Michelle Yeoh, Stephanie Hsu, Ke Huy Quan, Jenny Slate, Harry Shum Jr., James Hong, Jamie Lee Curtis		
Fire Island	Andrew Ahn	United States	Romantic comedy	Joel Kim Booster, Bowen Yang, Margaret Cho		
Fogaréu	Flávia Neves	Brazil	Drama			
Framing Agnes	Chase Joynt	Canada	Documentary	Angelica Ross, Zackary Drucker, Jen Richards, Max Wolf Valerio, Silas Howard, Stephen Ira		
Francheska: Prairie Queen	Laura O'Grady	Canada	Documentary	Francis Yutrago		
Fraud	Zen Pace	United States	Short drama			
F^¢k 'Em R!ght B@¢k	Harris Doran	United States	Short comedy			
Girl Picture (Tytöt tytöt tytöt)	Alli Haapasalo	Finland	Coming of age	Aamu Milonoff, Eleonoora Kauhanen, Linnea Leino		
God Save the Queens	Jordan Danger	United States	Comedy	Alaska Thunderfuck, Laganja Estranja, Kelly Mantle, Peter Facinelli, Michelle Visage		
Golden Delicious	Jason Karman	Canada	Drama	Cardi Wong, Chris Carson		
Hold Me Close Please	Max Roberts	United Kingdom	Short drama			
The Holiday Sitter	Ali Liebert	Canada; United States	Romantic comedy	Jonathan Bennett, George Krissa, Chelsea Hobbs		
The House of LaBeija	Fredgy Noël	United States	Short documentary			
Inner Wound Real	Carrie Hawks	United States	Short documentary			
The Inspection	Elegance Bratton	United States	Drama			
Into My Name (Nel mio nome)	Niccolo Bassetti	Italy	Documentary			
Jet Lag	Xinyuan Zheng Lu	Switzerland, Austria	Documentary			
Joyland	Saim Sadiq	Pakistan	Drama			
Junior's Giant	Paula Brancati	Canada	Short drama	Eric Peterson, Kinley Mochrie, Debra McGrath		
Ladies Only	Rebana Liz John	Germany, India	Documentary			
Lay Me by the Shore	David Findlay	Canada	Short drama			
Lightyear	Angus MacLane	United States	Animated			
Lines of Escape (Lignes de fuite)	Catherine Chabot, Miryam Bouchard	Canada	Comedy-drama	Catherine Chabot, Léane Labrèche-Dor, Mariana Mazza, Mickaël Gouin	Centres on the growing apart of three childhood friends in adulthood, one of whom is in a relationship with another woman	
Lonesome	Craig Boreham	Australia	Drama	Josh Lavery, Daniel Gabriel, Ian Roberts		
A Love Song	Max Walker-Silverman	United States	Drama			
Lucky	Loren Denis, Anthony Vibert	France	Documentary	Luc Bruyère		
Mars One (Marte um)	Gabriel Martins	Brazil	Drama			
Master	Mariama Diallo	United States	Thriller	Regina Hall, Amber Gray		
Manvee	Tanmay Nag	India	Drama	Peehu Biswas Sagar Kumar Jayanta Mondal		
My Dear Boy	Leaf Lieber	United States	Short drama			
My Policeman	Michael Grandage	United Kingdom	Drama	Harry Styles, Emma Corrin, David Dawson, Linus Roache, Gina Mckee, Rupert Everett		
Nelly & Nadine	Magnus Gertten	Sweden, Belgium, Norway	Documentary			
Nobody's Hero (Viens je t'emmène)	Alain Guiraudie	France	Drama			
Of an Age	Goran Stolevski	Australia	Drama			
Out in the Ring	Ry Levey	Canada	Documentary	Chyna, Lisa Marie Varon, Nyla Rose, Chris Kanyon, Pat Patterson, Valerie Wyndham, Dani Jordyn, Cassandro, Charlie Morgan, Sandy Parker, Pollo Del Mar, Wade Keller		
Pacifiction (Tourment sur les îles)	Albert Serra	Spain, France, Portugal, Germany	Drama	Benoît Magimel		
The People's Joker	Vera Drew	United States	Science fiction, fantasy			
Peter von Kant	François Ozon	France	Drama	Denis Ménochet, Isabelle Adjani, Hanna Schygulla	Gender-flipped reinterpretation of Rainer Werner Fassbinder's influential 1972 film The Bitter Tears of Petra von Kant	
Please Baby Please	Amanda Kramer	United States	Drama	Andrea Riseborough, Harry Melling, Karl Glusman, Demi Moore		
Petit Mal	Ruth Caudeli	Colombia	Drama			
Queens of the Qing Dynasty	Ashley McKenzie	Canada	Drama	Sarah Walker, Ziyin Zheng		
Queer Parivaar	Shiva Raichandani	United Kingdom	Short drama			
Rodeo (Rodéo)	Lola Quivoron	Drama	Julie Ledru			
Rosie	Gail Maurice	Canada	Comedy-drama			
Scaring Women at Night	Karimah Zakia Issa	Canada	Short drama	Izaiah Dockery, Kavita Musty, Dashawn Lloyd Blackwood		
Shall I Compare You to a Summer's Day? (Bastaalak sa'at)	Mohammad Shawky Hassan	Egypt, Germany, Lebanon	Musical			
Sick	John Hyams	United States	Horror, thriller			
Skin Deep (Aus meiner Haut)	Alex Schaad	Germany	Drama		Winner of the Queer Lion at the 79th Venice International Film Festival	
Soft	Joseph Amenta	Canada	Drama			
Something You Said Last Night	Luis De Filippis	Canada	Drama			
Sublime	Mariano Biasin	Argentina	Drama			
Summer with Hope (Tabestan Ba Omid)	Sadaf Foroughi	Canada, Iran	Drama	Mehdi Ghorbani, Leili Rashidi, Benyamin Peyrovani		
Swing Ride (Calcinculo)	Chiara Bellosi	Italy	Drama	Gaia Di Pietro, Andrea Carpenzano		
Tahara	Olivia Peace	United States	Drama			
Tarneit	John Sheedy	Australia	Short drama			
They/Them	John Logan	United States	Horror	Kevin Bacon, Theo Germaine, Anna Chlumsky, Carrie Preston, Austin Krute		
This Place	V. T. Nayani	Canada	Drama			
Thor: Love and Thunder	Taika Waititi	United Kingdom	Fantasy	Chris Hemsworth, Tessa Thompson, Natalie Portman, Christian Bale, Chris Pratt, Jaimie Alexander, Pom Klementieff, Dave Bautista, Karen Gillan, Sean Gunn, Jeff Goldblum, Vin Diesel, Bradley Cooper		
Three Headed Beast	Fernando Andrés, Tyler Rugh	United States	Drama			
Three Months	Jared Frieder	United States	Comedy drama	Troye Sivan, Viveik Kalra, Brianne Tju, Javier Muñoz, Judy Greer, Ellen Burstyn		
Three Tidy Tigers Tied a Tie Tighter (Três tigres tristes)	Gustavo Vinagre	Brazil	Drama			
Trick or Treat Scooby-Doo!	Aude Harrison	United States	Animated comedy			
Tommies	Karl Eccleston, Brian Fairbairn	United Kingdom	Short drama			
Tramps!	Kevin Hegge	Canada	Documentary		Profiles the New Romantic scene of the 1980s	
Valentine	Beck Kitsis, Chris McNabb	United States	Short drama			
Want/Need	Niamh Buckland	United Kingdom	Short drama			
We Will Never Belong	Amelia Eloisa	Mexico				
When Time Got Louder	Connie Cocchia	Canada	Drama	Willow Shields, Lochlyn Munro, Elizabeth Mitchell		
Will-o'-the-Wisp (Fogo-Fátuo)	João Pedro Rodrigues	Portugal, France				
Winter Boy (Le Lycéen)	Christophe Honoré	France	Drama	Paul Kircher, Juliette Binoche, Vincent Lacoste		
Work	April Maxey	United States	Short drama			
You Can Live Forever	Sarah Watts, Mark Slutsky	Canada	Drama	Anwen O'Driscoll, June Laporte, Liane Balaban, Hasani Freeman, Antoine Yared, Deragh Campbell		
The Whale	Darren Aronofsky	United States of America	Drama	Brendan Fraser, Sadie Sink, Hong Chau, Ty Simpkins, and Samantha Morton		
