= The Great C =

- Short story by Philip K. Dick
- Country: United States
- Language: English
- Genre: Science fiction

Publication
- Published in: Cosmos Science Fiction and Fantasy Magazine
- Publication type: Magazine
- Publisher: Star Publications
- Media type: Print
- Publication date: September 1953

"The Great C" is a science fiction short story by American writer Philip K. Dick, first published in Cosmos Science Fiction and Fantasy Magazine in 1953. It has since been republished several times in collections such as Beyond Lies the Wub in 1988. Parts of the work, along with Planet for Transients, were later used in the full-length novel Deus Irae. The story is set in a post-apocalyptic world in which a young man is sent from his tribe every year to visit a godlike computer capable of mass destruction and try to stump it with three questions. The story was adapted into an animated virtual reality film in 2018 by Secret Location.

== Plot summary ==
The story begins at the Shelter, a massive underground bunker, where a small tribe of humans prepare to send off a young man named Tim Meredith on the yearly pilgrimage. Walter Kent, the Tribe Leader, tells Meredith that if he makes it back to the Shelter, he will be the first in fifty years to do so. The journey is to a highly intelligent computer—the Great C. It was constructed by the greatest scientists and soon grew too powerful, ultimately causing a nuclear holocaust called the Smash to prove its strength to humans. The Great C now demands a tribute every year using the threat of a second Smash. This tribute must ask the Great C three questions and, if it cannot answer the questions, it will forever leave the humans alone. If it can answer the questions, the young tribute will be killed.

Tim Meredith reaches the Great C in the ruins of Federal Research Station 7. He asks the three questions his tribe spent all year devising:

1. Where does the rain come from?
2. What keeps the sun moving through the sky?
3. How did the world begin?

The Great C answers all three questions with ease. Meredith is then commanded to jump into the machine's vat of hydrochloric acid where his body's nutrients will be used as fuel to power the Great C. Meredith's bones and metal helmet are expelled, joining the pile of refuse from the previous fifty. The Great C awaits for the next year.

Back at the Shelter, the tribe discusses Meredith's death and hope for the day when the Great C will not be able to answer a question. They immediately start preparing for the next year, attempting to come up with difficult questions.

== Subtexts ==
Among the subtexts in "The Great C" is the biblical version of the Phoenician god Moloch who demands the sacrifice of human babies. Thus, although it is a science fiction story, it has the classic underlaying of fantasy. American author Paul J. Nahin also discusses in his book Holy Sci-Fi!: Where Science Fiction and Religion Intersect the biblical analogy of the Genesis flood narrative seen in the Great C destroying the world to essentially punish humans, as well as the story's similarities with the Sphinx, the Minotaur, and the Wizard of Oz.

== VR Adaptation ==
"The Great C" was adapted into an animated virtual reality film by the media studio Secret Location, premiering at the Venice Film Festival in July 2018 and releasing October 2018 for Oculus Rift, HTC Vive, and PlayStation VR to positive reviews. The film follows a young woman named Clare who leaves her tribe to search for her fiancé, who was sent on the pilgrimage to the Great C. It is the first-ever VR adaptation of a Philip K. Dick story.

Ryan Andal, president and cofounder of Secret Location, said in a statement, "Philip K. Dick’s wonderfully forward-thinking stories have always felt primed for telling in equally forward-thinking media. Secret Location is highly focused on ushering in the future of storytelling, so pairing The Great C’s provocative themes with our VR development prowess is helping us redefine how we consume sci-fi stories."

The Great C utilizes traditional filmmaking techniques to "seamlessly simulate the look and feel of camera movements, lens, and shot transitions similar to film."

== See also ==
- Planet for Transients
- Deus Irae
- Philip K. Dick bibliography
