= Amblin Partners =

American entertainment company

Storyteller Distribution Co., LLC
- Logo used since 2015
- Trade name: Amblin Partners, LLC.
- Type: Joint venture
- Industry: Entertainment
- Predecessor: DreamWorks SKG
- Founded: December 16, 2015; 10 years ago
- Founders: Steven Spielberg; Jeff Skoll; Anil Ambani; Darren Throop
- Headquarters: Universal City, California, United States
- Area served: Worldwide
- Key people: Steven Spielberg (chairman); Jeff Small (CEO); Holly Bario; (president of production)
- Products: Motion pictures; Television
- Owners: Reliance Entertainment (20%); Lionsgate Studios (30%); Damai Entertainment (30%); Universal Pictures (20%)
- Divisions: Amblin Entertainment; DreamWorks Pictures; Amblin Television
- Website: amblin.com

Storyteller Distribution Co., LLC, doing business as Amblin Partners, LLC., is an American independent entertainment production company founded on December 16, 2015. It developed and produced films under the Amblin Entertainment and DreamWorks Pictures banners, as well as television series through Amblin Television.

The company's investment partners included Reliance Group's Reliance Entertainment, Lionsgate Studios, Alibaba Group's Damai Entertainment, and NBCUniversal/Comcast's Universal Pictures.Films produced by Amblin Partners were primarily distributed by either Universal or its specialty label Focus Features in North America and select international territories, and by third-party distributors through Mister Smith Entertainment in other countries.

== History ==
Amblin Partners, LLC. was founded by Steven Spielberg, Jeff Skoll of Participant Media, Anil Ambani of Reliance Anil Dhirubhai Ambani Group, and Darren Throop of Entertainment One on December 16, 2015. The company primarily would focus on producing and distributing films and television using the DreamWorks Pictures, Amblin Entertainment, and Participant Media brands. For films, it uses the original live-action DreamWorks label for mature content, the Amblin label for family-friendly content (with the exception of Maestro, which is rated R), and the Participant label for social justice content, although Participant remained as a separate company.

On the same day as the company's formation, Amblin Partners announced that it entered into a five-year distribution deal with Universal Pictures by which the films would be distributed and marketed by either the main Universal banner or its specialty label, Focus Features. The Girl on the Train was the first film released under the deal. Mister Smith Entertainment, which began its international distribution deal with DreamWorks in August 2012, continued to handle distribution sales for Amblin Partners in Europe, the Middle East and Africa.

On October 9, 2016, Amblin Partners struck a deal with China's Alibaba Pictures, in which Alibaba acquired a minority equity stake in the company and would handle marketing, distribution support, and merchandising of Amblin Partners films in China in addition to co-financing Amblin Entertainment and DreamWorks Pictures films worldwide. Although financial details were not shared during the formalization of the partnership, both parties agreed that they could co-produce movies for a global and Chinese audience and work together for marketing and merchandising.The agreement included cross-media merchandising items like lunch boxes, bedspreads, and action figures that served as official tie-ins manufactured by Alibaba group subsidiaries like Tmall.com, ensuring the items adhered to brand integrity. On February 15, 2017, Comcast's Universal acquired a minority stake in Amblin Partners, strengthening the relationship between Universal and Amblin, and reuniting a minority percentage of the DreamWorks Pictures label with its former animation division, which Comcast acquired the year prior in 2016.

On December 18, 2017, Amblin Partners signed a music publishing deal with BMG Rights Management, covering music from its films and television series.

=== Transfer of eOne's stake ===
On August 22, 2019, Hasbro announced that it would acquire Entertainment One for at least $4 billion. The acquisition was completed on December 30, 2019, resulting in the toy company inheriting Entertainment One's stake in Amblin Partners.

On November 30, 2020, Amblin Partners renewed its distribution deal with Universal, which continued to be an equity stake holder. That same month however, Participant terminated its equity stake in Amblin Partners, ending its relationship with the company.

On June 21, 2021, Amblin Partners signed a multi-year deal to produce "multiple new feature films per year" for Netflix.

On November 17, 2022, Hasbro announced that was selling part of Entertainment One's television and film business not directly supporting their Branded Entertainment strategy, which included their stake in Amblin Partners. In March 2023, Deadline reported that Lionsgate (which Hasbro attempted to acquire in 2017), Fremantle, and Universal's former co-financing partner, Legendary Entertainment were among bidders for the assets of Entertainment One. The following month, it was reported Lionsgate, Legendary, and GoDigital Media Group were among the potential buyers, with Fremantle dropping out of contention following an increase in the selling price, which was beyond what the company was willing to pay for the assets. On April 20, 2023, it was reported that Hasbro was in talks with Throop, whose bid was backed by CVC Capital Partners, on the possibility of buying the company back.

On July 11, 2023, Amblin Partners announced it entered a partnership with its distributor, Universal, where Universal will co-finance Amblin's productions, as Amblin announced it would lay off 20% of its staff. In the same month Deadline reported that Lionsgate was a frontrunner to acquire Entertainment One, with Legendary and GoDigital still among the potential buyers and Throop attempting to launch another bid for the company after his previous attempt with CVC failed.

On August 3, 2023, Lionsgate announced it would acquire Entertainment One from Hasbro for $500 million, with the transaction closed on December 27, 2023.

=== Shutdown of Participant ===
On April 16, 2024, Participant ceased operations due to the 2023 Hollywood labor disputes.

== Film library ==
=== Released ===
Title	Release date	Label	Other production companies	Distributor
The BFG	July 1, 2016	Amblin Entertainment	Walt Disney Pictures, Walden Media and Reliance Entertainment	Walt Disney Studios Motion Pictures
The Light Between Oceans	September 2, 2016	DreamWorks Pictures	Touchstone Pictures, Reliance Entertainment, Participant Media and Heyday Films	Walt Disney Studios Motion Pictures
The Girl on the Train	October 7, 2016	DreamWorks Pictures	Reliance Entertainment and Marc Platt Productions	Universal Pictures
Office Christmas Party	December 9, 2016	DreamWorks Pictures	Reliance Entertainment, Entertainment 360 and Bluegrass Films	Paramount Pictures
A Dog's Purpose	January 27, 2017	Amblin Entertainment	Reliance Entertainment, Walden Media and Pariah Entertainment Group	Universal Pictures
Ghost in the Shell	March 31, 2017	DreamWorks Pictures	Reliance Entertainment, Grosvenor Park Productions, Seaside Entertainment and Arad Productions	Paramount Pictures
Thank You for Your Service	October 27, 2017	DreamWorks Pictures	Reliance Entertainment and Rahway Road Productions	Universal Pictures
The Post	December 22, 2017	Amblin Entertainment and DreamWorks Pictures	Reliance Entertainment, Pascal Pictures and Star Thrower Entertainment	20th Century Fox
7 Days in Entebbe	March 16, 2018	Participant Media	Working Title Films	Focus Features
The House with a Clock in Its Walls	September 21, 2018	Amblin Entertainment	Reliance Entertainment and Mythology Entertainment	Universal Pictures
First Man	October 12, 2018	DreamWorks Pictures	Temple Hill Entertainment, Phantasma Films, and Perfect World Pictures	Universal Pictures
Green Book	November 16, 2018	DreamWorks Pictures and Participant Media	Innisfree Pictures and Cinetic Media	Universal Pictures
Welcome to Marwen	December 21, 2018	DreamWorks Pictures	ImageMovers and Perfect World Pictures	Universal Pictures
On the Basis of Sex	December 25, 2018	Participant Media	Robert Cort Productions	Focus Features
Captive State	March 15, 2019	Participant Media	Lightfuse & Gettaway	Focus Features
A Dog's Journey	May 17, 2019	Amblin Entertainment	Reliance Entertainment, Walden Media and Pariah Entertainment Group	Universal Pictures
Dark Waters	November 22, 2019	Participant	Killer Films	Focus Features
1917	December 25, 2019	DreamWorks Pictures	Reliance Entertainment, New Republic Pictures, Neal Street Productions and Mogambo	Universal Pictures
The Turning	January 24, 2020	DreamWorks Pictures	Vertigo Entertainment and Reliance Entertainment	Universal Pictures
Come Play	October 30, 2020	Amblin Partners	The Picture Company and Reliance Entertainment	Focus Features
Stillwater	July 30, 2021	Participant and DreamWorks Pictures	Slow Pony, Anonymous Content, 3dot Productions and Supernatural Pictures	Focus Features
Finch	November 5, 2021	Amblin Entertainment	Reliance Entertainment, ImageMovers, Misher Films and Walden Media	Apple TV+
Easter Sunday	August 5, 2022	DreamWorks Pictures	Reliance Entertainment, Rideback	Universal Pictures
The Good House	September 30, 2022	Participant and DreamWorks Pictures	Roadside Attractions, Faliro House, Reliance Entertainment and FilmNation Entertainment	Lionsgate
The Fabelmans	November 11, 2022	Amblin Entertainment	Reliance Entertainment	Universal Pictures
The Last Voyage of the Demeter	August 11, 2023	DreamWorks Pictures	Reliance Entertainment, Storyworks Productions, Studio Babelsberg, Phoenix Pictures and Wise Owl Media	Universal Pictures
Carry-On	December 13, 2024	DreamWorks Pictures	Dylan Clark Productions	Netflix
Long Distance	July 3, 2025	DreamWorks Pictures	Reliance Entertainment and Automatik Entertainment	Universal Pictures

=== Upcoming ===
Title	Release date	Label	Other production companies	Film distributor
You Should Be Dancing	TBA	Amblin Entertainment	Scott Free Productions, GK Films and Sister Films	Paramount Pictures

==== In development ====
Title	Label	Other production companies	Film distributor
Arachnophobia	DreamWorks Pictures	Atomic Monster	TBA
Apeirogon	DreamWorks Pictures	TBA	TBA
American Reaper	DreamWorks Pictures	Intrepid Pictures	TBA
Assassins Anonymous	DreamWorks Pictures	TBA	TBA
Beautiful Ruins	DreamWorks Pictures	Neal Street Productions	TBA
Carrier	DreamWorks Pictures	Automatik Entertainment and QCode	TBA
Cheshire Crossing	DreamWorks Pictures	Michael De Luca Productions	TBA
Confessions in B-Flat	DreamWorks Pictures	Orit Entertainment and Marcy Place Productions	TBA
Homecoming Queen	DreamWorks Pictures	TBA	TBA
James	DreamWorks Pictures	TBA	Universal Pictures
Long Lost	TBA	Genre Pictures and Ground Control Entertainment	Universal Pictures
Miss Macy	TBA	TBA	TBA
Super in Love	TBA	TBA	TBA
Stage 13	TBA	TBA	TBA
The Act	TBA	TBA	TBA
The Bear	TBA	Marc Platt Productions	TBA
The Exchange	TBA	Escape Artists	TBA
The First Fifteen Lives of Harry August	TBA	Blueprint Pictures and OddBall Entertainment	TBA
The Kidnapping of Edgardo Mortara	DreamWorks Pictures	The Kennedy/Marshall Company	Universal Pictures
The Light of Days	TBA	TBA	TBA
The Richest Black Girl in America	TBA	TBA	TBA
The Switch	TBA	TBA	TBA
Untitled Jutta Kleinschmidt biopic	TBA	87North Productions and Devonsheer Media	TBA
Untitled true-life show choir film	TBA	Safehouse Pictures	TBA
Upgrade	TBA	TBA	TBA
