= List of LGBTQ-related films of the 2020s =

LGBTQ-related films released in the 2020s are listed in the following articles:

- List of LGBTQ-related films of 2020
- List of LGBTQ-related films of 2021
- List of LGBTQ-related films of 2022
- List of LGBTQ-related films of 2023
- List of LGBTQ-related films of 2024
- List of LGBTQ-related films of 2025
- List of LGBTQ-related films of 2026
