= Darren Throop =

Canadian businessman

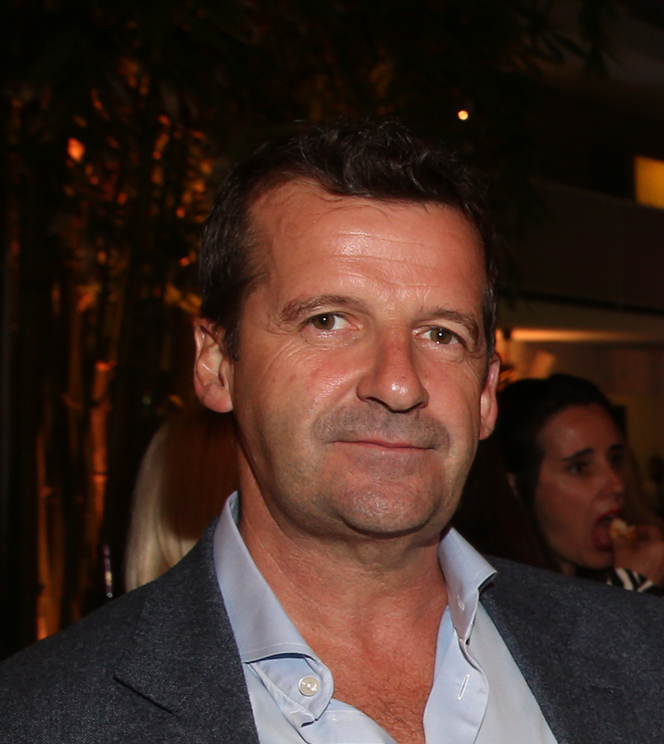
- Darren Throop in 2017
- Born: Bashaw, Alberta, Canada
- Known for: Founder of Entertainment One
- Title: Founder and former CEO

Darren Throop is a Canadian businessman who is the founder and former CEO of Entertainment One (eOne). Through corporate acquisitions and partnerships, Throop has expanded Entertainment One's global footprint and network which includes film and television studio The Mark Gordon Company; content creation venture Amblin Partners with Steven Spielberg, DreamWorks Pictures, Participant Media, and Reliance Entertainment; leading feature film production and global sales company Sierra Pictures; unscripted television production companies Renegade 83, Paperny Entertainment and Force Four Entertainment; world-class music labels Dualtone Music Group and Last Gang Records; and award-winning digital agency Secret Location.

Prior to Entertainment One he was the CEO of ROW Entertainment Income Fund.

Throop sits on the IMAX Corporation Board of Directors. He was recently inducted into the Canadian Music Industry Hall of Fame, and recognized as Entrepreneur of the Year at the Grant Thornton Quoted Company Awards.

== Career ==
His career in the entertainment industry began in 1991 when he founded Urban Sound Exchange, an independent chain of retail music stores. Building and acquiring several music distribution ventures over ten years, including CDPlus.com and Records on Wheels, Throop became CEO of ROW Entertainment (ROW) in 2001. Throop diversified its operations through a series of acquisitions, including overseeing the purchase of Video One Canada, Canada's largest home entertainment company.

As CEO of ROW, Throop took the company public in 2003 and then orchestrated the acquisition of Koch Records, North America's largest independent music label and subsequently changed the company name to Entertainment One. With the company's comprehensive U.S. Canadian distribution network, Throop began aggressively acquiring the rights for specialty content. In 2007, to fund expansion into independent feature film distribution and rights ownership, Throop orchestrated the movement of Entertainment One to London's Alternative Investment Market in a $200 million IPO.

Shortly after the listing, Throop began acquiring leading content producers and distributors around the globe. Stepping up to the main market of the London Stock Exchange in 2010, Entertainment One was confirmed as a FTSE 250 entrant in the FTSE UK Index Series in 2013. In 2019, he sold the company to American toy manufacturer Hasbro for nearly $4 billion and he remains the CEO to date.

On August 22, 2022, it was announced that Throop would be stepping down as CEO at the end of the year.

On April 20, 2023, Hasbro entered talks to sell eOne back to its founder Darren Throop. However, eOne would instead be sold to Lionsgate and be renamed Lionsgate Canada.
