= A Killer Behind Closed Doors =

2022 film by Roxanne Boisvert

- Screenplay by: Michael Perrone
- Directed by: Roxanne Boisvert
- Starring: Camille Stopps; Jacob Richter; George Krissa; Dawn Lambing
- Music by: Richard Bowers
- Country of origin: Canada
- Original language: English

Production
- Producers: Steve Boisvert; Ivy Bregman
- Editor: Jordan Jensen
- Running time: 90 minutes
- Production company: Ontario Creates

Original release
- Network: Lifetime
- Release: 2022

A Killer Behind Closed Doors, also known as Trapped With My Husband, is a 2022 Canadian television thriller film directed by Roxanne Boisvert.

The film was presented as "inspired by true events" though no specific event was cited by the creators. It was made available on Lifetime, as part of "LMN’s Unhappily Ever After".

== Reception ==
Geeks stated, "While it doesn't start off on the best foot, Trapped With My Husband doesn't keep the viewer trapped in a monotonous plot cycle for long. Right when the cat-and-mouse routine between Melissa and Kevin starts wearing thin, the latter's death (ironically) brings the story back to life long enough to sustain itself until the tension-brimmed conclusion." while MEAWW commented that the film was "not to be missed",
