= List of Argentine films of 2022 =

This is a list of Argentine films released in 2022.

== Films ==
Title	Director	Cast	Notes	Release	Ref.
Argentina, 1985	Santiago Mitre	Ricardo Darín, Peter Lanzani		29 September	
Charcoal (Carvão)	Carolina Markowicz	César Bordón, Rômulo Braga, Jean de Almeida Costa, Maeve Jinkings, Camila Márdila			
Counting Sheep (Contando ovejas)	José Corral Llorente	Natalia de Molina, Eneko Sagardoy, Juan Grandinetti	Spain-Argentina coproduction	1 September	
Ecos de un crimen	Cristian Bernard	Diego Peretti, Julieta Cardinali, Carla Quevedo, Diego Cremonesi, Carola Reyna		27 January	
Hoy se arregla el mundo	Ariel Winograd	Leonardo Sbaraglia, Natalia Oreiro, Benjamín Otero		13 January	
I Don't Want to Be Dust	Iván Lowenberg	Bego Sainz, Anahí Allué, Agustina Quinci, Romina Coccio, Manuel Poncelis, Eduardo Azuri, Mónika Rojas, Luis Felipe Castellanos, J.C. Montes-Roldan, Gerardo Monzalvo, Iván Lowenberg, Rodrigo Cuevas, Mariana Leon Lambarri, Ilse Miranda, Luciana Islas, Magda Vizcaíno, Edurne Keel, Ingrid Lowenberg, Keyla Wood	Mexico-Argentina coproduction	22 December	
The Monroy Affaire	Josué Méndez	Damián Alcázar, María Zubiri, Olivia Manrufo, Maryloly López, Grapa Paola, Liliana Trujillo, Lia Camilo, Wendy Vázquez	Peru-Argentina coproduction	6 October	
The Newest Olds	Pablo Mazzolo				
Pornomelancholia	Manuel Abramovich				
La Provisoria	Melina Fernández da Silva & Nicolás Meta	Andrés Ciavaglia, Ana Pauls, Juan Chapur, Sol Bordigoni, Nicolás Juárez, Albertina Vázquez	An international co-production with Chile, Brazil, Colombia and France	17 November	
Sublime	Mariano Biasin			November 17	
The Substitute (El suplente)	Diego Lerman	Juan Minujín, Alfredo Castro, Bárbara Lennie, María Merlino, Lucas Arrua, Renata Lerman, Rita Cortese	Argentina-Italy-France-Mexico-Spain coproduction. Won Havana Star Prize for Best Director at 22nd Havana Film Festival New York	20 October	
