= Burden of Truth (TV series) =

Canadian legal drama television series

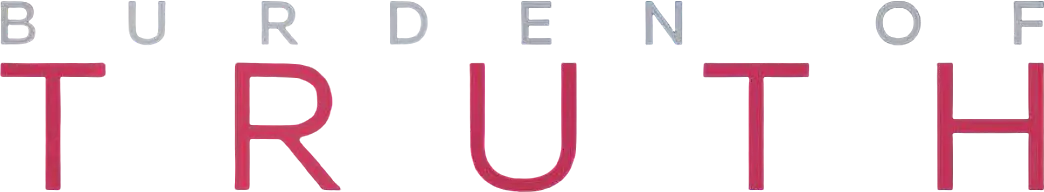
- Genre: Legal drama
- Created by: Brad Simpson
- Starring: Kristin Kreuk; Peter Mooney
- Country of origin: Canada
- Original language: English
- No. of seasons: 4
- No. of episodes: 34

Production
- Executive producers: Kristin Kreuk; Ilana Frank; Jocelyn Hamilton
- Running time: 42 minutes
- Production companies: ICF Films; Eagle Vision; Entertainment One

Original release
- Network: CBC Television
- Release: January 10, 2018 – March 18, 2021

Burden of Truth is a Canadian legal drama television series, starring Kristin Kreuk and Peter Mooney, which premiered on CBC on January 10, 2018. The series was created by Brad Simpson, with Kreuk, Ilana Frank and Jocelyn Hamilton serving as executive producers. In the US, the series aired as part of The CW's summer programming slate. One of the issues addressed in the series is institutional racism towards indigenous people.

== Plot ==
Corporate attorney Joanna Hanley returns to her small hometown of Millwood, Manitoba in order to represent a large pharmaceutical company against a group of sick girls, but starts to see that these girls need her help.

== Cast and characters ==
=== Main ===
- Kristin Kreuk as Joanna Chang (formerly Hanley, in season 1), an attorney from Toronto who has come back to the town she grew up in to defend a pharmaceutical company against a group of sick girls. However, she stays both to uncover the bigger conspiracy hiding the true cause of the girls' sickness and to find out the truth about why she and her father left Millwood in the first place. She changes her surname to her mother's maiden name by the final scene of the first season as a result of a better understanding with each other, and her estranged relationship with her father.
- Peter Mooney as William Crawford, the lawyer representing the girls and later Joanna's partner in uncovering the conspiracy. He is the uncle of Molly Ross, one of the first girls to get sick. It is revealed in Season 2 that he has strained relationships with his father and his brother Shane. By the start of Season 3, he and Joanna become partners with the newly formed Crawford Chang and domestically.
- Star Slade as Luna Spence, Joanna's assistant and younger half sister as well as Molly Ross's girlfriend
- Nicola Correia-Damude as Diane Evans, a Guyanese-Canadian school guidance counselor and an old friend of Joanna's
- Meegwun Fairbrother as Owen Beckbie, an indigenous cop and Luna's ex-stepfather. By the start of Season 3, he was promoted to Millwood's Chief of Police.
- Paul Braunstein as Sam Mercer, Millwood's Chief of Police corrupted by his own racism towards indigenous residents which puts him at odds with Owen. By the end of Season 2, he is stripped of his duties, dismissed from the force and sent to prison for the death of an indigenous man. Released from prison at the start of Season 3, he engages in blackmail which was discovered by Taylor and Owen.
- Sara Thompson as Molly Ross (Seasons 1–2), one of the sick girls, Billy Crawford's niece and Luna's girlfriend
- Anwen O'Driscoll as Taylor Matheson, one of the sick girls and Ben Matheson's daughter
- David Lawrence Brown as Ben Matheson (Seasons 1–2), father of Taylor Matheson, one of the sick girls and the owner of the town's mill.
- Michelle Nolden as Teddie Lavery (Season 2), Joanna's mentor and boss at Steadman Lavery
- Varun Saranga as Noah Achari (Season 2), Joanna's new client
- Sera-Lys McArthur as Kodie Chartrand (Season 3), Joanna's indigenous childhood best friend who is threatened with separation from her two daughters
- Dayle McLeod as Katherine "Kat" Carmichael (Season 3), a recent law school graduate who was the only one of Crawford Chang's two original Associates to be retained. So impressed by Joanna that she gave up more lucrative opportunities to work with her, she later developed a close relationship with colleague Luna.

=== Recurring ===
- Cassandra Potenza as Georgia Lewis
- Benjamin Ayres as Alan Christie (season 1, 3), an attorney working for Joanna's father's law firm and, whom Joanna was dating at the start of the series.
- Jessica Matten as Gerrilyn Spence, Luna's mother
- Rebecca Gibson as Wendy Ross, Billy's sister and Molly's mother
- Jerni Stewart as Lisa Mitchell
- Montana Lehmann as Allie Nash
- Alex Carter as David Hanley (Seasons 1–2), Joanna's father and a partner at the law firm she worked for at the start of the series. Estranged from Joanna and revealed to be Luna's biological father, his murder was one of the primary storylines in Season 2.
- Andrew Chown as Shane Crawford (season 2), Billy's brother
- Raymond Ablack as Sunil Doshi (season 2), a young lawyer at Steadman Lavery

== Episodes ==
Season	Episodes	Originally released	
Season	Episodes	First released	Last released
1	10	January 10, 2018	April 4, 2018
2	8	January 9, 2019	February 27, 2019
3	8	January 8, 2020	February 26, 2020
4	8	January 28, 2021	March 18, 2021

=== Season 1 (2018) ===
No. overall	No. in season	Title	Directed by	Written by	Original release date
1	1	"Pilot"	Jeff Woolnough	Brad Simpson	January 10, 2018
When it is suspected that her big pharmacy client's vaccine has caused a mysterious illness affecting a handful of teenaged girls, high-powered attorney Joanna Hanley returns to her hometown of Millwood -- despite her father's reservations -- to quickly and quietly settle the case. She goes up against Billy Crawford, an old friend from high school, and easily defeats him -- and a turn in the case reveals that her client is not at fault. However, a mystery from Joanna's past -- especially concerning why she and her father left Millwood 17 years ago -- compels her to slowly begin to second-guess the choices she has made along the path to partnership in her father's prestigious big city law firm. Joanna's successful, strong-arm legal tactics also earn her the ire of the townspeople, especially one ill teenage girl who calls out Joanna for her actions. Instead of immediately returning home with another easy win, Joanna decides to stay and help Billy dig into a case which she believes could turn into a profitable class action lawsuit.
2	2	"The Ties That Bind"	Jeff Woolnough	Brad Simpson	January 17, 2018
A fish out of water in a town that's as foreign as it is familiar, Joanna must reckon with questions over her family's hasty departure when she was a teenager, as she and Billy commence their investigation of the cause of the mysterious illness affecting the town's teenage girls. Joanna must also deal with increasing pressure from her father and an associate from the legal firm to return home.
3	3	"Still Waters"	Jordan Canning	Lynn Coady	January 24, 2018
Relying on her esteemed reputation as a partner at CTS, Joanna convinces a hydrologist to come to Millwood to test the soil. With reluctant permission from the local Mayor, Joanna and Billy narrow down their list of suspects to a handful of industrial sites in the community. After testing the soil and groundwater around town, they make the startling discovery that the field is the source of the toxin when they uncover barrels of sludge buried there -- but someone would rather they stop digging, and the pair get run off the road.
4	4	"Family Ties"	Jordan Canning	Shannon Masters	January 31, 2018
Convinced that the local steel mill and its owner, Ben Matheson, are responsible for the barrels buried in the school field, Joanna and Billy go after him but don't have enough to make the allegation stick. When her father shows up and persuades her that Ben's offer to clean the field is the best deal she's going to get, Joanna decides to pack up to return home. However, a shocking revelation in her personal life leads her to question everything her father has ever told her. Joanna resigns from her father's firm and in a knee-jerk reaction, files a statement of claim against the mill.
5	5	"Witch Hunt"	James Genn	Brad Simpson & Eric Putzer	February 28, 2018
Anger over the claim against the mill pits the sick girls and their families against employees of the mill who worry that their jobs are on the line. When the local Pastor's daughter becomes afflicted with the illness, he blames the girls themselves. Parents begin keeping their healthy kids home from school, so to quell the mounting hysteria, the High School Principal cracks down on the affected girls by suspending them from school and prevents them from attending their prom. Joanna fires back at the school, but victory eludes her. When the kids decide to throw a prom of their own, Billy and Joanna are made honorary prom king and queen. However, the moment is over-shadowed by the mill's answer to her claim – they've hired her father's law firm to represent them and they plan to annihilate her.
6	6	"The Devil in the Desert"	James Genn	Hayden Simpson & Laura Good	March 7, 2018
As death threats against Joanna and Billy escalate, Joanna digs her heels in on the case. Relying on the expert testimony of a respected neuropsychologist, Joanna expects he'll prove once and for all that the girls have been poisoned. Instead, after assessing them, he pronounces that the ailment is "all in their head", they have what's called Conversion Disorder. With the opposition breathing down their neck, Joanna and Billy scramble to salvage their suit.
7	7	"Ducks on the Pond"	Douglas Mitchell	Graeme Stewart	March 14, 2018
Stuck in Millwood without a case and no longer having a firm to return home to, Joanna is at loose ends on what to do next. While she toys with the idea of taking a job offer at another firm, Billy works to get their case reinstated without much success. However, when the doctor who claimed that the girls were suffering with conversion disorder is exposed for using them as research for his new book, they get his testimony thrown out. Better still, a whistleblower comes forward and reveals an additional source of toxic waste and a new patient zero. Joanna is back on the case with more fervor than ever.
8	8	"Hang Together"	Douglas Mitchell	Hayden Simpson	March 28, 2018
Following some new leads, Joanna and Billy make the horrific discovery of a massive dumpsite on farmland near the school. They finally have enough evidence to certify as a class but it won't be an easy fight. Someone has obviously gotten to their whistleblower as he's no longer willing to cooperate or help them. To make matters worse, Joanna's father takes over as lead counsel and has Joanna disqualified due to a conflict of interest. When one of the girls gets diagnosed with cancer, it becomes clear that they're running out of time.
9	9	"Home to Roost"	Grant Harvey	Lynn Coady	April 4, 2018
With Joanna disqualified and the clock running out on Billy who'll have to face Joanna's hostile father alone, Joanna must think outside the box if they want to win this. She must face the one person who may be able to help her defeat her father, her estranged mother. Not only does she learn the truth about her father, she gains the critical piece of evidence that ties the mill and their parent company to the dumping. Regrettably, Joanna returns too late and finds the case in shambles, her named plaintiff removed and the class de-certified.
10	10	"Cause in Fact"	Grant Harvey	Brad Simpson	April 4, 2018
Using the law to her advantage, Joanna gets herself reinstated on a legal technicality and unable to elicit a settlement offer she blackmails her father by threatening to reveal that Gerrilyn was underage when the two had sex resulting in the birth of Luna. David capitulates and agrees to all of Joanna's terms, but reveals that because he kept the settlement to under $20 million he will still get his bonus. The girls all celebrate their settlement in their own ways, while Joanna accepts a new job in Winnipeg and prepares to leave town.

=== Season 2 (2019) ===
No. overall	No. in season	Title	Directed by	Written by	Original release date
11	1	"Salesman, Cheats and Liars"	Grant Harvey	Brad Simpson	January 9, 2019
Joanna Chang is living a new life at a new firm with a new name when she's assigned a case of a brilliant young Internet privacy activist who will turn everything in her new life upside down. Meanwhile, back in Millwood, Billy Crawford is dealing with the aftermath of the Matheson Steel lawsuit.
12	2	"The Rabbit Hole"	Grant Harvey	Adam Pettle	January 16, 2019
Joanna deals with the aftermath of an invasion of privacy. Billy entertains Shane's idea to save the town.
13	3	"The Milk of Human Kindness"	Stephanie Morgenstern	Renée St. Cyr	January 23, 2019
Joanna struggles to control the narrative of Noah's case when Lovand starts a smear campaign against him. Billy and Gerrilynn wait for an answer in their civil suit, when an unexpected visitor turns up in Millwood with an offer.
14	4	"Guilt by Association"	Stephanie Morgenstern	Shannon Masters	January 30, 2019
Back in Millwood after learning of a death of someone close to her, Joanna doesn't get a moment to mourn as the overzealous police are already zeroing in on Gerrilynn Spence. Joanna and Billy team up to halt a rush to judgment.
15	5	"Cold, Tired and Hungry"	Michelle Latimer	Hayden Simpson	February 6, 2019
Joanna and Billy scramble to get Luna out on bail but a surprise witness comes forward with information that will change everything.
16	6	"Manic Street Preacher"	Michelle Latimer	Felicia Brooker & Renée St. Cyr	February 13, 2019
Sleepless and suppressing her grief, Joanna tries to maintain her job at Steadman Lavery while preparing for jury selection in Luna's trial. Billy uncovers evidence from Shane that may provide an alternate theory about the murder.
17	7	"Never Face the Hangman"	Douglas Mitchell	Eric Putzer	February 20, 2019
On the eve of Luna's trial, Joanna reaches out to an old client when she discovers a new piece of evidence that will lead her to the identity of the real killer. Billy attempts to get help for Shane but is forced to make an agonizing choice.
18	8	"The Right Road"	Douglas Mitchell	Brad Simpson	February 27, 2019
As Luna's trial starts, Joanna and Billy defend against an avalanche of evidence. With things not looking good, Joanna risks everything by putting an unexpected witness on the stand.

=== Season 3 (2020) ===
No. overall	No. in season	Title	Directed by	Written by	Original release date
19	1	"Crawford Chang"	James Genn	Brad Simpson	January 8, 2020
Joanna Chang and Billy Crawford face a verdict in their first case in their new firm and an old friend from Joanna’s past suffers a devastating loss.
20	2	"Wherever You Go"	James Genn	Adam Pettle	January 15, 2020
Reeling from the sudden apprehension of Kodie’s children by Millwood Family Services, Joanna sets out to win back custody, but in order to win in court, she must conduct a thorough and potentially revealing investigation into her old friend’s life.
21	3	"No Fathers and Sons"	Kelly Makin	Felicia Brooker	January 22, 2020
After losing at the custody hearing, Joanna is desperate to help Kodie and recklessly launches an emergency challenge to the court-appointed custodian. The case brings Billy face to face with the last person he wanted to see.
22	4	"Desperate Measures"	Kelly Makin	Julie Puckrin	January 28, 2020
With no hope left in the judicial system, Kodie snatches her kids and goes on the run. With all of Millwood Police looking for her and with the imminent threat of a province-wide Amber Alert, Joanna must track Kodie down first in order to have any chance at saving her custody case.
23	5	"Crisis of Faith"	Sherry White	Laura Good	February 5, 2020
With more potential cases of wrongful child apprehensions, Joanna and Billy investigate Millwood Family Services and discover a potential error in the custody hearing evidence that will change everything in the case and in their lives.
24	6	"It Takes a Village"	Sherry White	Hayden Simpson	February 12, 2020
In an attempt to build a case against ClearDawn labs for the wrongful apprehension of children in Millwood, Joanna reluctantly agrees to try to put together a Class Action. Billy gets a tip from his father about a potential break in the case.
25	7	"Name Your Ghosts"	Douglas Mitchell	Eric Putzer	February 19, 2020
Coming off the loss of class certification, Joanna and Billy decide to go after ClearDawn alone, turning to the only lead they have - an unreliable whistleblower. Luna goes to extreme lengths to save another child from a wrongful apprehension.
26	8	"Shelter from the Storm"	Douglas Mitchell	Brad Simpson and Mary Galloway	February 26, 2020
Joanna and Billy head to trial against ClearDawn labs while still desperately searching for a way to expose the fraudulent science used to wrongfully apprehend children.

=== Season 4 (2021) ===
No. overall	No. in season	Title	Directed by	Written by	Original release date
27	1	"River City"	Douglas Mitchell	Brad Simpson	January 28, 2021
With Millwood divided over a proposed mining project, lawyer and new mother Joanna Chang takes on the case of a landowner whose farm is standing in the way of the mine.
28	2	"Breaking Points"	Douglas Mitchell	Madison Thomas	February 4, 2021
Joanna searches for her client’s long-lost daughter to protect her client’s legal interests and keep the case alive.
29	3	"From Out the Gloomy Rack"	Kelly Makin	Eric Putzer	February 11, 2021
Joanna, now in custody and facing questions from federal agents, is forced to confront dark secrets from her past.
30	4	"Scorched Earth"	Kelly Makin	Shannon Masters	February 18, 2021
Joanna races to find evidence to dismiss the charges against her before her end-of-day hearing. Billy’s search for a lead in the case has personal consequences.
31	5	"Spirits in the Material World"	Madison Thomas	Felicia Brooker	February 25, 2021
Joanna and Billy, struggling to deal with the demands of being new parents, are blindsided when their injunction against the mine is overturned.
32	6	"The Homecoming"	Madison Thomas	Hayden Simpson	March 4, 2021
As Joanna and Billy scramble to keep their case alive, the evidence they uncover begins to point to a shocking conclusion about the mine.
33	7	"Where the Shadows Lie Waiting..."	Michelle Latimer	Meegwun Fairbrother & Eric Putzer	March 11, 2021
With one day left before the disciplinary hearing, Joanna and Billy set out to finish the case against the mine.
34	8	"Standing by Peaceful Waters"	Michelle Latimer	Bradley Simpson	March 18, 2021
With her abrupt departure from her preliminary hearing and her legal career seemingly over, Joanna -- with Billy's love and assistance -- begins to chart a new path for the future outside the law.

== Production ==
Noelle Carbone and Adriana Maggs were the original showrunners but left the series. Ten one-hour episodes were ordered. It was filmed in Winnipeg, Manitoba in summer 2017. The series' original setting was supposed to have been in Eastern Canada but was changed to Manitoba because of lower production costs. Location shots were filmed in Selkirk and Sanford, with several shots in the Riverside Grill. In outdoor shots, traffic on the Selkirk bridge is visible, as is the Landmark Cinemas Garry Selkirk theater.

The series was renewed for an eight-episode second season on April 4, 2018.

The series was renewed for an eight-episode third season on March 25, 2019, and returned on January 8, 2020.

On July 21, 2020, the series was renewed for an eight-episode fourth season.

On March 18, 2021, it was announced that the series would end after four seasons.

== Broadcast ==
In April 2018, The CW network acquired the series for a planned run in the United States in mid-2018. The series debuted on the network on July 25, 2018. The network aired seasons 2 and 3 in the summers of 2019 and 2020. Season 4 returned to the CBC on January 28, 2021. The final season aired in the United States on The CW on July 30, 2021, and the series concluded on September 17, 2021. In January 2022, the series became available on Hulu in the US.
