= Boylesque (film) =

- Directed by: Bogna Kowalczyk
- Written by: Bogna Kowalczyk
- Produced by: Tomasz Morawski; Katarzyna Kuczyńska; Vratislav Šlajer
- Starring: Andrzej Szwan
- Cinematography: Miłosz Kasiura
- Edited by: Krzysztof Komander; Kacper Plawgo; Aleksandra Gowin
- Music by: Wojciech Frycz
- Production companies: Haka Films; Bionaut Films
- Release date: 4 May 2022 (Hot Docs)
- Running time: 70 minutes
- Countries: Poland; Czech Republic
- Language: Polish

Boylesque is a Polish-Czech documentary film, directed by Bogna Kowalczyk and released in 2022. The film is a portrait of Andrzej Szwan, an 82-year-old Polish man who performs in drag as Lulla La Polaca, and remains committed and driven as both an entertainer and an activist despite the uncertain state of LGBT rights in Poland.

Kowalczyk has described the film as meant to be a portrait of Szwan's resilience and engagement, rather than just a depiction of the challenges of being LGBT in Poland.

The film premiered at the 2022 Hot Docs Canadian International Documentary Festival, where Kowalczyk won the award for Emerging International Filmmaker.
