= Counting Sheep (film) =

2019 film by Paco Cabezas

- Theatrical release poster
- Spanish: Contando ovejas
- Directed by: José Corral Llorente
- Written by: José Corral Llorente; Nicolás Britos
- Produced by: José Carmona; Pedro Hernández Santos
- Starring: Eneko Sagardoy; Natalia de Molina; Juan Grandinetti; Consuelo Trujillo; María Fernando Valera; Manolo Solo; Julián Villagrán; José Luis García-Pérez
- Cinematography: Sara Gallego
- Edited by: Miguel A. Trudu
- Production companies: Aquí y Allí Films; La Nube Películas; Wanka Cine; To Each His Strangers AIE
- Distributed by: Filmax (es)
- Release dates: 13 April 2022 (Spain); 1 September 2022 (Argentina)
- Running time: 111 minutes
- Countries: Spain; Argentina
- Language: Spanish

Counting Sheep (Spanish: Contando ovejas) is a 2022 Spanish-Argentine black comedy film directed by José Corral Llorente, starring Eneko Sagardoy and Natalia de Molina.

== Plot ==
The plot is set in 1993 Spain. Lonely Ernesto lives in a ruinous building, and can barely sleep because of the noise from the neighbors. Some of his creations (a group of sheep made of papier-mâché) come to life and persuade him into doing unthinkable things.

== Cast ==
- Eneko Sagardoy as Ernesto
- Natalia de Molina as Paola
- Juan Grandinetti as Leandro
- José Luis García Pérez as Napoleón (voice)
- Manolo Solo as Platón (voice)
- Julián Villagrán as Metus (voice)
- Consuelo Trujillo as Doña Juana
- María Fernanda Valera as Laura

== Production ==
The film is a Spanish-Argentine co-production by Aquí y Allí Films, Wanka Cine, Lanube Películas, and To Each His Strangers AIE with backing from ICAA, INCAA, Ibermedia, Canal Sur and Filmin. It was shot in Madrid.

== Release ==
Distributed by Filmax, the film was released theatrically in Spain on 13 April 2022.

== Reception ==
Fernando Bernal of Cinemanía rated Counting Sheep 3 out of 5 stars, deeming it to be a "stimulating debut film between [a] constumbrista thriller and [a] nightmare" in the verdict.

Beatriz Martínez of El Periódico de Catalunya rated the film 3 out of 5 stars, deeming it to be "an unclassifiable work, full of kamikaze ideas and with a murky and uncomfortable background that runs through it from beginning to end".

== See also ==
- List of Spanish films of 2022
- List of Argentine films of 2022
