= Lionsgate Canada =

Canadian entertainment company

- Logo used since 2024, separate from outside of Canada using "eOne" brand.
- Formerly: Records On Wheels Limited (1973–1980); ROW Entertainment Limited (1980–2001); Entertainment One Income Fund (2001–2009); Entertainment One Limited (2009–2023); eOne Canada (2023–2024)
- Type: Subsidiary
- Industry: Entertainment
- Predecessors: Koch Entertainment; Contender Entertainment Group; Medusa Communications & Marketing; Alliance Films; Phase 4 Films
- Founded: June 1, 1973; 53 years ago
- Founder: Vito Ierullo; Don Ierullo; Darren Throop
- Headquarters: 134 Peter Street, Toronto, Ontario, Canada
- Area served: Canada
- Key people: Jocelyn Hamilton (President)
- Products: Film; Television; Virtual reality; Live entertainment
- Revenue: £941.2 million (2019)
- Parent: Hasbro (2019–2023); Lionsgate (2023–2024); Lionsgate Studios (2024–present)
- Subsidiaries: Entertainment One UK; Makeready (co-backing with Universal Filmed Entertainment Group); Sierra/Affinity
- Website: lionsgate.com/canada

Lionsgate Canada (formerly Records On Wheels Limited, ROW Entertainment, Entertainment One and E1 Entertainment) is a Canadian entertainment company and a subsidiary of Lionsgate Studios. Based in the Entertainment District in the city of Toronto, the company is primarily involved in the acquisition and production of films and television series.

The company began on June 1, 1973 as the Canadian music distributor Records on Wheels Limited. After it was acquired by music retailer CD Plus, the company became ROW Entertainment; with its vice president of operations Darren Throop becoming president and CEO. ROW later acquired American music and home entertainment distributor Koch Entertainment. By 2007, the company—now known as Entertainment One—had begun to acquire other production companies and film distributors including Canadian distributors Les Films Séville and Alliance Films. By 2015, eOne had begun to expand its American operations, including investing in Amblin Partners, and acquiring a stake in The Mark Gordon Company.

On December 30, 2019, eOne was acquired by American toy and entertainment company Hasbro for US$4 billion. The company saw cutbacks under Hasbro, which sold eOne's original music distribution business (now MNRK Music Group) to Blackstone on April 26, 2021, and closed its theatrical distribution operations in Australia, Canada, Spain, and the United Kingdom on June 29, 2022, and July 17, 2023. The cutbacks were part of a planned sale of entertainment assets not strongly tied to eOne's children's entertainment brands, such as Peppa Pig, which would be folded into Hasbro's intellectual property and merchandising business following the acquisition.

On August 3, 2023, Hasbro announced that it would sell eOne's assets to Lionsgate (another Canadian-founded business) for $500 million. The deal closed on December 27, 2023. The company's assets would then be restructured, with the main division initially becoming eOne Canada before adapting its current name. eOne Films was placed under Lionsgate Films, while eOne Television merged with other assets into Lionsgate Television, with eOne's unscripted production assets being transferred to the newly formed Lionsgate Alternative Television.

In May 2024, Lionsgate spun off its film and television business, including Lionsgate Canada, into Lionsgate Studios.

== History ==
=== Establishment ===
The company has its origins in the music distributor Records on Wheels Limited (which was established on June 1, 1973 by brothers Vito and Don Ierullo), and the music retail chain CD Plus. The chain was in the process of acquiring other companies to bolster its wholesale operations in music and home video, leading to its purchase of Entertainment One on June 11, 2001. Its vice president of operations, Darren Throop, had joined the company after CD Plus acquired his Nova Scotia-based record store chain Urban Sound Exchange. The combined company later became known as ROW Entertainment, with Throop as president and CEO. The company listed itself on the Toronto Stock Exchange as an income trust, meaning that its taxes were paid by its shareholders, rather than the company itself.

On June 1, 2005, it acquired the U.S. independent music distributor and home entertainment publisher Koch Entertainment. Afterwards, it was re-incorporated as Entertainment One Income Fund. On March 29, 2007, the company accepted a $188 million public equity takeover by Marwyn Investment Management to fund its expansion; the company was listed on London's Alternative Investment Market as Entertainment One Ltd.

=== Expansion ===
On June 14, 2007, Entertainment One acquired Montreal-based film distributor Seville Pictures and British distributor Contender Entertainment Group; The same year, the company secured its first film output agreement with Summit Entertainment, handling distribution in Canada and the United Kingdom. Acquisitions continued on January 9, 2008 with the purchase of the Benelux distributor RCV Entertainment. The same year, Entertainment One acquired the television studios Blueprint and Barna-Alper, and international television distributor Oasis International. Also on July 4, 2008, the company listed itself on the London Stock Exchange.

On January 22, 2009, Entertainment One Income Fund briefly rebranded as E1 Entertainment. During this period, E1 folded Rubber Duck Entertainment into E1 Kids; which would later become the "eOne Family & Brands" division. E1 would revert back to the Entertainment One branding on July 16, 2010; dropping "Income Fund" from its title, and adopting the abbreviation of eOne.

On April 12, 2011, eOne acquired Australian distribution company Hopscotch for £12.9 million. On May 28, 2012, eOne placed a bid to purchase the Canadian film distributor Alliance Films from Goldman Sachs Group and Investissement Québec. The deal was completed on January 9, 2013, giving eOne Canadian distribution rights for titles from The Weinstein Company, Lionsgate (which would acquire eOne a decade later), CBS Films, FilmDistrict and Focus Features. On May 28, 2014, eOne announced a strategic investment in interactive agency Secret Location; the firm would continue to operate independently under the leadership of James Milward (President, Executive Producer and Founder), and partners Pietro Gagliano (Creative Director and SVP) and Ryan Andal (Technical Director and SVP). On June 2, 2014, eOne acquired Phase 4 Films; its CEO Berry Meyerowitz was named as head of eOne's U.S. film distribution business and North American family entertainment business. On July 17, the company acquired Paperny Entertainment. On August 28, 2014, eOne acquired Force Four Entertainment.

On January 5, 2015, eOne acquired a 51% stake in Mark Gordon's self-named studio, with an option to acquire the remainder at a later date. The purchase was part of an effort by eOne to bolster its presence in the U.S. On September 9, 2015, eOne revived the Momentum Pictures brand (which was previously used by Alliance UK) and announced that it had entered into a multi-picture deal with Orion Pictures to jointly acquire films for "specialized theatrical releases" in the U.S., and targeted international releases, focusing on ancillary and digital distribution. Marwyn Investment Management sold its 18% stake in Entertainment One to the Canada Pension Plan Investment Board (CPPIB) on September 16, 2015.

On September 30, 2015, eOne acquired a 70% stake in British animation studio Astley Baker Davies, best known for producing the pre-school TV series Peppa Pig. On December 16, 2015, eOne, Steven Spielberg, Reliance Entertainment, and Participant Media officially announced a joint venture known as Amblin Partners. eOne served as an investor, while the majority of its films would be distributed by Universal Pictures.

On January 7, 2016, eOne made a strategic investment in Sierra Pictures and on January 20, 2016, the company acquired Dualtone Music Group. On March 8, 2016, eOne the acquired music recording, publishing and artist management company Last Gang, and announced that its founder Chris Taylor would join the company as president of music. In 2016, eOne acquired a majority stake in unscripted production company Renegade 83.

On February 24, 2016, Entertainment One reached a home media distribution deal with 20th Century Fox Home Entertainment to release eOne's titles on DVD and Blu-ray in the United Kingdom. On August 10, 2016, eOne rejected an offer to be acquired by British television broadcaster ITV plc for £1 billion ($1.3 billion US). eOne considered the offer to be "fundamentally undervalued".

On August 17, 2016, eOne announced that it would acquire Secret Location outright for an undisclosed amount. On September 12, 2016, eOne announced its acquisition of UK-based music management company Hardlivings. That same year, eOne acquired music management company Nerve. On September 9, 2016, eOne reached a first-look co-financing and international distribution deal with Tucker Tooley's Tooley Productions. In 2016, eOne entered into an agreement with Ole (now as Anthem Entertainment) to administer its music catalogue.

=== 2017–2019 ===
eOne consolidated its film and television studios into a single structure in 2017, as part of an effort to reposition its operations towards production rather than acquisitions and "large output deals". On May 17, 2017, eOne announced a partnership with former New Regency president and CEO Brad Weston on his new studio Makeready, serving as a lead investor and holding international distribution rights to its television productions. On January 29, 2018, eOne acquired the remaining 49% of The Mark Gordon Company, and Gordon was named eOne's new president and chief content officer of film, television and digital.

On April 9, 2018, eOne acquired UK non-scripted production company Whizz Kid Entertainment. Later that year, eOne joined a round of investment in Jeffrey Katzenberg's short-form digital content venture "NewTV" (later renamed Quibi until 2020). On January 8, 2019, eOne's Australia division announced a deal with Universal Pictures for Australian theatrical, home video and co-distribution rights which resulted in closure on March 19, 2019.

On March 5, 2019, eOne's Benelux division changed its name to WW Entertainment, founded by Wilco Wolfers and Caspar Wenckebach. Later that month, eOne ended their home media distribution agreement with 20th Century Fox Home Entertainment following Fox's purchase by the Walt Disney Company on March 20, 2019. eOne reached an agreement with Universal Pictures Home Entertainment to handle home media distribution of its films and television series in Australia, Canada, Germany, Spain, New Zealand, the U.S., and the United Kingdom. The deal expired five years later.

In 2019, eOne acquired England-based unscripted programme company Daisybeck Studios, and U.S. unscripted programme company Blackfin, hiring its founder and CEO Geno McDermott as president of U.S. alternative programming. Also in 2019, eOne Music acquired Audio Network, a British company involved in the production of music for film and television, for $215 million.

=== Sale to Hasbro ===
On August 22, 2019, American toy and media company Hasbro announced that it had reached an agreement to acquire Entertainment One for US$4 billion. Throop cited that its goals to "unlock the power and value of creativity" were "aligned with Hasbro's corporate objectives", and would be enhanced by access to Hasbro's properties and merchandising capabilities. eOne's Canadian operations will be structured in such a way as to maintain eligibility for Canadian content classification. The deal was approved by the Ontario Superior Court of Justice. On November 21, 2019, the United Kingdom's Competition and Markets Authority (CMA) announced that it would investigate the purchase under British competition law, to determine if it would result in a lessening of competition. The sale was completed on December 30, 2019; with eOne becoming a wholly owned subsidiary of Hasbro, and Throop remaining as CEO of eOne, reporting to Hasbro CEO Brian Goldner. The UK CMA cleared the acquisition the following month. On April 30, 2020, it was reported that eOne had a animated Transformers movie in development, which would become Transformers One.

After the acquisition, eOne began to take on development and international distribution roles for content based upon Hasbro properties, such as My Little Pony: Pony Life. Head of family brands Olivier Dumont stated that this was a "very straightforward division of responsibilities in the sense that eOne is the content arm of the group, and Hasbro is the consumer products arm." On February 10, 2021, it was announced that eOne would be laying off 10% of its film and television staff. On April 26, 2021, eOne announced that it would sell its music division to The Blackstone Group for $385 million. The acquisition was closed in June 2021, after which it was renamed MNRK Music Group.

On June 29, 2022, it was reported that Entertainment One was closing its theatrical distribution operations in Canada and Spain, with minor layoffs taking place in Canada; Entertainment One continues to acquire films in these territories for non-theatrical distribution. On August 22, 2022, it was reported that Hasbro was seeking to sell or restructure its media assets, and it was announced that CEO Darren Throop would step down at the end of the year.

=== Sale to Lionsgate ===
On November 17, 2022, Hasbro announced that it planned to sell most of eOne's film and television assets, as part of a plan to "focus on strategic investment in key franchise brands". The sale excludes the assets of eOne's Family & Brands division, which had been folded into Hasbro's merchandising and licensing business to create a new subsidiary, Hasbro Entertainment. In March 2023, Deadline reported that Lionsgate, Fremantle, and Legendary Entertainment were among the leading suitors. Lionsgate, another film studio founded in Canada, previously reached an agreement with Hasbro to co-finance a film based on the Monopoly board game with Allspark Pictures in 2015. Hasbro would later attempt to acquire Lionsgate in 2017.

The next month, it was reported that Fremantle had dropped out of contention after the selling price escalated beyond what the company was willing to pay, but that CVC Capital Partners and GoDigital Media Group had also entered the running. On April 20, 2023, it was reported that Hasbro was in talks with Throop, who made a bid backed by CVC Capital Partners to buy the company back. In July 2023, Deadline reported that Lionsgate was a frontrunner to acquire Entertainment One, with Legendary Entertainment and GoDigital still among the potential buyers, and Throop attempting to launch another bid for the company after his previous attempt with CVC failed. In July 2023, it was reported that Entertainment One was closing down distribution operations in the UK, with British staff layoffs also taking place as part of budget cuts and layoffs by Hasbro.

On August 3, 2023, Hasbro announced that it had reached an agreement to sell eOne's entertainment assets to Lionsgate (which Hasbro attempted to acquire in 2017) for $500 million: Lionsgate would pay $375 million in cash and assume $125 million in production financing loans. The deal closed on December 27, 2023. Following the acquisition, eOne was rebranded to eOne Canada (a name previously used while under Hasbro ownership), eOne Films became part of Lionsgate Films, and eOne Television merged into Lionsgate Alternative Television.

On June 7, 2024, it was exclusively revealed to Playback that eOne Canada was rebranded as Lionsgate Canada. In an interview, president of television Jocelyn Hamilton said "It just makes sense. Lionsgate is domiciled in Canada and now we’re adding to that to make this an even stronger and bigger entity here. We’re still a separate entity and a Canadian business." The "eOne" brand remains in use outside of Canada.

== eOne Films ==
Entertainment One Films Ltd.
- Logo used since 2015
- Trade name: eOne Films
- Formerly: E1 Entertainment Films (2009–2010)
- Type: Division
- Industry: Film production
- Predecessors: Alliance Films; Momentum Pictures; Christal Films; Les Films Séville
- Founded: January 22, 2009; 17 years ago
- Headquarters: 134 Peter Street, Toronto, Ontario, Canada
- Area served: Worldwide
- Products: Motion pictures
- Parent: Entertainment One (2009–2023); Lionsgate Films (2023–present)
- Website: www.entertainmentone.com

Entertainment One Films Ltd., trading as eOne Films, was formed on January 22, 2009. Initially involved primarily in acquiring films for international distribution, eOne Films has since shifted its resources towards producing and funding its own films.

After its acquisition by Lionsgate, eOne Films is the only entity to retain the "Entertainment One" branding.

=== History ===
In 2012, the company announced that it would acquire Alliance Films for CDN$225 million, which also added the assets of Maple Pictures and Momentum Pictures to its holdings. eOne also handled the Canadian distribution rights to the Miramax library, as well as the pre-2005 Dimension Films library from 2013 to 2024.

On May 8, 2015, eOne consolidated its film production and international sales units into a new unit known as eOne Features, with a goal to self-produce and finance six-to-eight films per-year. On December 16, 2015, it was announced that eOne would be an investor in Amblin Partners. On September 23, 2016, Xavier Dolan's eOne-distributed film Juste la fin du monde was announced as Canada's entry in the Best Foreign Language Film category for the 89th Academy Awards.

On January 8, 2019, Universal Pictures acquired eOne's Australian and New Zealand self-distribution division. eOne distributed Universal's Best Picture winner Green Book in 2019. eOne has also distributed Best Picture winner Spotlight and Best Picture nominee 1917. In 2020, eOne was the top distributor in the UK with about 15.3% of the total market.

== Productions ==
=== Films ===
- Insidious: Chapter 2 (2013)
- Insidious: Chapter 3 (2015)
- Snowtime! (2015; English language version)
- Just Getting Started (2017) (Co-production with Endurance Media, distributed by Broad Green Pictures in the United States)
- Stan & Ollie (2018)
- Racetime (2018; English language version)
- Wild Rose (2019)
- Scary Stories to Tell in the Dark (2019) (co-production with Lionsgate and CBS Films)
- Official Secrets (2019) (co-production with IFC Films)
- Jexi (2019) (co-production with Lionsgate and CBS Films)
- Mary (2019) (co-production with TT Entertainment, distributed by RLJE Films)
- Midway (2019) (studio credit only, co-production with Lionsgate and Centropolis Entertainment)
- Queen & Slim (2019) (co-production with Universal Pictures, Makeready and Bron Studios)
- A Million Little Pieces (2019) (co-production with The Picture Company and Makeready, distributed by Momentum Pictures)
- Love and Monsters (2020) (co-production with Paramount Pictures and 21 Laps Entertainment)
- Happiest Season (2020) (co-production with TriStar Pictures and Temple Hill Entertainment)
- Awake (2021) (co-production with Netflix)
- Snake Eyes (2021) (studio credit only, co-production with Paramount Pictures, Metro-Goldwyn-Mayer, Skydance Media and Di Bonaventura Pictures)
- Blue Bayou (2021) (studio credit only, co-production with Focus Features and Macro)
- Come from Away (2021) (co-production with Junkyard Dog Productions, RadicalMedia and Alchemy Production Group)
- The Starling (2021)
- My Little Pony: A New Generation (2021) (co-production with Netflix and Boulder Media)
- Clifford the Big Red Dog (2021) (co-production with Paramount Pictures, The Kerner Entertainment Company, New Republic Pictures and Scholastic Entertainment)
- Deep Water (2022)
- All the Old Knives (2022)
- Mrs. Harris Goes to Paris (2022) (studio credit only; co-production with Hero Squared, Superbe Films and Moonriver Content; distributed by Focus Features in the United States and Universal Pictures internationally)
- Orphan: First Kill (2022) (co-production with Paramount Players, Dark Castle Entertainment, Sierra/Affinity, and Eagle Vision; distributed by Paramount Pictures in the United States, by Signature Entertainment in the United Kingdom and by VVS Films in Canada)
- The Woman King (2022) (co-production with TriStar Pictures, Welle Entertainment, JuVee Productions, and Jack Blue Productions)
- Dungeons & Dragons: Honor Among Thieves (2023) (co-production with Paramount Pictures and Sierra/Affinity)
- Transformers: Rise of the Beasts (2023) (studio credit only, co-production with Paramount Pictures, Skydance Media, Hasbro, New Republic Pictures and Di Bonaventura Pictures)
- The Creator (2023) (co-production with Regency Enterprises and Bad Dreams; distributed by Walt Disney Studios Motion Pictures through 20th Century Studios)
- Arthur the King (2024) (co-production with Lionsgate, Tucker Tooley Entertainment, Mark Canton Productions and Municipal Pictures)
- Den of Thieves 2: Pantera (2025) (co-production with Tucker Tooley Entertainment and G-BASE; distributed by Lionsgate)
- Dust Bunny (2025) (co-production with Thunder Road Films)

=== Virtual reality ===
Below is a list of Secret Location VR games:

- The Great C
- Transpose
- Welcome to Wacken
- Blasters of the Universe
- Blasters of the Universe Infinity Forever
- Paranormal Pest Patrol
- NERF Ultimate Championship

== Acquisitions and targets ==
Since listing on the London Stock Exchange's AIM submarket, eOne has made a series of acquisitions, but added with a timeline.

- On June 14, 2007, eOne acquired Contender Entertainment Group (which included brands Rubber Duck Entertainment, Hong Kong Legends and Premier Asia), one of the largest distributors of TV content in the United Kingdom. (now operates as eOne UK)
- On August 17, 2007, eOne acquired Seville Entertainment Inc. for a yet-to-be-disclosed sum. (now operates as Les Films Séville)
- On January 9, 2008, eOne acquired the Netherlands-based distributor RCV Entertainment. (now operates as eOne Benelux)
- On July 4, 2008, eOne acquired TV producers Blueprint Entertainment and Barna-Alper Productions as well as domestic distributors Oasis International and Maximum Films. (Barna-Alper now operating as eOne Television, Maximum Films amalgamated into eOne Films Canada while Maximum Film International was amalgamated into Les Films Séville, all others closed)
- On April 12, 2011, eOne acquired Australian distribution company Hopscotch for £12.9 million. (now operates as eOne Australia)
- On January 22, 2013, eOne acquired Alliance Films.
- On June 2, 2014, eOne acquired Phase 4 Films.
- On July 17, 2014, eOne acquired Paperny Entertainment.
- On August 28, 2014, eOne acquired Force Four Entertainment.
- In May 2014, eOne made a strategic equity investment in interactive agency Secret Location, and later took full control.
- In January 2015, eOne acquired a 51% stake in The Mark Gordon Company. It acquired the remaining 49% on January 30, 2018.
- On September 30, 2015, eOne acquired control of the animation studio Astley Baker Davies.
- On March 26, 2018, eOne acquired Round Room Entertainment, a live entertainment company, founded by Stephen Shaw in 2016.
- On April 9, 2018, eOne acquired a majority 70% stake in England-based Whizz Kid Entertainment, producer of Ex on the Beach.
- On April 11, 2019, eOne acquired England-based Audio Network, an independent creator and publisher of original music for use in film, television, advertising and digital media.
- On July 11, 2019, eOne acquired British factual producer Daisybeck Studios.
- On September 12, 2019, eOne acquired US-based, nonfiction content producer Blackfin.

== Defunct divisions ==
=== Television ===
Entertainment One Television BAP Ltd.
- Final logo used from 2015 to 2024
- Formerly: Barna-Alper Productions Inc. (1980–2009); E1 Television BAP Ltd. (2009–2010)
- Type: Division
- Industry: Television production
- Predecessors: Barna-Alper Productions; Blueprint Entertainment; Oasis International; Atlantis Communications
- Founded: June 9, 1980; 46 years ago
- Founders: Laszlo Barna; Laura Alper
- Defunct: January 9, 2024; 2 years ago
- Fate: Ongoing shows and upcoming projects in development shifted and folded into Lionsgate Television.
- Successor: Lionsgate Television
- Headquarters: 134 Peter Street, Toronto, Ontario, Canada
- Key people: John Morayniss; (CEO)
- Parent: Entertainment One
- Divisions: Barna-Alper Releasing
- Website: www.entertainmentone.com/television (archived July 2019)

eOne Television (formerly Barna-Alper Productions) was a television production company founded in 1980 by Laszlo Barna and Laura Alper and based in Toronto, Ontario. In April 2005, the company launched a distribution division, Barna-Alper Releasing. Entertainment One acquired Barna-Alper Productions Inc., Blueprint Entertainment, and distributor Oasis International on July 4, 2008 to expand its television production and distribution capabilities. As part of a company-wide rebrand, the three companies were folded into E1 Television on January 22, 2009.

Notable television series distributed or produced by eOne and its subsidiaries have included the three Ilana Frank-produced series Burden of Truth, Rookie Blue and Saving Hope, Bitten, The Book of Negroes, Border Security: Canada's Front Line, Call Me Fitz, Cardinal, Criminal Minds, Designated Survivor, Haven, Klondike, Mary Kills People, Naked and Afraid, Private Eyes, The Rookie, Siesta Key, The Walking Dead, and the HBO series Hung, Run with AMC Networks to handle the international distribution of its original scripted productions, beginning with Halt and Catch Fire. The agreement expanded on existing pacts for the eOne-produced Hell on Wheels, and international distribution for The Walking Dead. The pact ended on May 8, 2019 (with AMC having since expanded its in-house distribution business), although it will continue to handle international distribution for existing series, as well as The Walking Dead and Fear the Walking Dead.

Entertainment One's television assets were folded into Lionsgate Television on January 9, 2024, and were succeeded by Lionsgate Canada and Lionsgate Alternative Television for production of television shows, respectively, within and outside Canada.

=== Family & Brands ===
eOne Family & Brands
- Final logo used from 2015 to 2023
- Formerly: Rubber Duck Entertainment (2005–2009); E1 Kids (2009–2010); Entertainment One Family (2010–2015)
- Industry: Television production
- Predecessor: Claster Television; Saban Entertainment; Hasbro Entertainment (first incarnation); Saban Brands; Allspark
- Founded: July 1, 2005; 21 years ago
- Defunct: August 16, 2023; 3 years ago
- Fate: Folded into Hasbro Entertainment
- Successor: Hasbro Entertainment
- Headquarters: 45 Mortimer Street, London, England, United Kingdom
- Key people: Olivier Dumont (president)
- Owner: Contender Entertainment Group (2005–2009); Entertainment One (2009–2023)
- Website: www.eonefamily.com/home (archived July 2017)

eOne's Family & Brands division dealt primarily in family-oriented intellectual property, including development, distribution, licensing, and marketing. The division seen growth credited to retail sales, licensing deals, and programming sales to broadcasters, accounting for US$202 million in revenue on May 21, 2018. It represented a year-over-year increase of 28%, with Peppa Pig and PJ Masks alone accounting for $114.9 million and $75.8 million respectively. Upon the acquisition of eOne by Hasbro, the division was folded into Hasbro's IP portfolio and licensing business.

=== Virtual reality ===
After making an investment in the company in 2014, eOne acquired the Toronto-based digital content studio Secret Location in 2016, which specializes in virtual and augmented reality experiences. In 2015, Secret Location won a Primetime Creative Arts Emmy Award in "Outstanding User Experience and Visual Design" for a tie-in to the drama series Sleepy Hollow.

In 2020, the studio's first VR film The Great C won the Positron Visionary Award for Best Cinematic VR Experience at the 2020 Cannes XR Film Festival. That same year, Secret Location won the Outstanding Media Innovation Award by the Academy of Canadian Cinema & Television.

== Current and former names and logos ==
The company logo introduced on July 16, 2010 was designed by Toronto-based firm Parcel Design. On September 8, 2015 at the Toronto International Film Festival, Entertainment One announced its logo had been refreshed.

Entertainment One (2010–2015)

Entertainment One (2015–2024, still used on eOne Films)

Alternative variant (2015–2024, still used on eOne Films)

Lionsgate Canada (2024–present)

Lionsgate Canada (2025–present, used for corporate purposes)
