= Sublime (2022 film) =

2022 Argentine film directed by Mariano Biasin

- Directed by: Mariano Biasin
- Written by: Mariano Biasin
- Production companies: Tarea Fina; Verdadera Imagen
- Release date: 12 February 2022 (BIFF)
- Running time: 100 minutes
- Country: Argentina
- Language: Spanish

Sublime is a 2022 Argentine coming-of-age drama romance film written and directed by Mariano Biasin. It tells the story of two best friends who, over time, begin to feel attracted to each other as teenagers.

== Cast ==
- Martín Miller - Manuel
- Teo Inama Chiabrando - Felipe
- Azul Mazzeo - Azul
- Joaquín Arana - Fran
- Facundo Trotonda - Mauro

== Production ==
Due to the COVID-19 pandemic, some actors were removed due to production suspension. The film was shot in Villa Gesell.

== Release ==
The film had its world premiere on February 12, 2022, during the Berlin International Film Festival, while it had its limited release on November 17, 2022, in cinemas in Argentina.

In North America it was released by Cinephobia Releasing on video on demand and DVD on June 20, 2023.

== Reception ==
On the review aggregator website Rotten Tomatoes, 83% of 12 critics' reviews are positive.

In a review for the Argentine newspaper Clarín, Pablo O. Scholz wrote that "the young people's performances seem spontaneous when they are not forced by a text" and that the director [Biasin] "lets what counts be as natural as possible". Also from Argentina, Diego Brodersen of Página 12 described how "the director elicits naturalistic performances from the young cast that are largely credible and fresh", while "the other notable aspect is the music".

In his review for The New York Times, Erik Piepenburg wrote: "Biasin’s script plods as it relies on repetitive band rehearsals and inert conversations to pad a story that only mildly explores young gay desire — like Heartstopper but with less charm and fewer stakes." At Los Angeles Times, Noel Murray wrote: "This is a slight but insightful film that feels very real."

At Film Threat, Sumner Forbes wrote: "just because I wasn’t vibing with much of Sublime doesn’t mean I can’t admire it as a picture with a boundless heart." Rating it 3/5 stars on The Guardian, Phuong Le highlighted in her review: "avoiding schmaltzy pitfalls, this moving drama about two friends nearing adulthood offers a modern ideal of masculinity."

== See also ==
- List of films impacted by the COVID-19 pandemic
- List of LGBTQ-related films of 2022
- List of coming-of-age stories
- List of Argentine films of 2022
- List of drama films of the 2020s
- List of romance films
