= Deus Irae =

1976 novel by Philip K. Dick

- Cover of first edition (hardcover)
- Author: Philip K. Dick and Roger Zelazny
- Cover artist: John Cayea
- Language: English
- Genre: Science fiction
- Publisher: Doubleday
- Publication date: 1976
- Publication place: United States
- Media type: Print (hardback & paperback)
- Pages: 182
- ISBN: 0-385-04527-1
- OCLC: 2188373
- Dewey Decimal: 813/.5/4
- LC Class: PZ4.D547 De PS3554.I3

Deus Irae is a post-apocalyptic science fiction novel written by two American authors; it was started by Philip K. Dick and finished with the help of Roger Zelazny. It was published in 1976. The novel's title, Deus irae, means 'God of Wrath' in Latin; the title is a play on words on the phrase Dies Irae, meaning 'Day of Wrath' or 'Judgment Day'. The novel was based on Dick's short stories "The Great C" and "Planet for Transients".

== Origins ==
Dick started the novel, and then he realized that he did not know enough about Christianity to finish it. He asked science fiction editor and author Ted White to collaborate on the manuscript with him, but after reviewing the manuscript, White never began the work.

Zelazny found the manuscript in White's home in early 1968, read it, and then contacted Dick about working on the project. Work proceeded sporadically over several years as each author, in turn, forgot about the book. The novel was completed quickly, though, in the spring of 1975, after the publisher, Doubleday, demanded either the manuscript or repayment of the advance paid to Dick. The editor discovered that Zelazny had sent photocopies of a number of the manuscript pages and demanded the originals according to Doubleday's policy; much to Zelazny's chagrin, he was required to send in pages stained with cat urine. Zelazny said later that he always wondered what the editor made of these pages.

== Plot ==
After 1982, the world experienced a devastating nuclear war. Fallout and radiation have caused widespread mutations to human and animal populations alike, and the national communications systems are permanently down. There is a new messianic religion, akin to gnosticism. The members of this religion, known as the Servants of Wrath or SOWs, worship the creator and detonator of the war's ultimate weapon, Carleton Lufteufel (from the German words "Luft," meaning "air," and "Teufel," meaning "Devil"), ex-chairman of the Energy Research and Development Agency of the United States of America - ERDA/USA.

In Charlottesville, Utah, there are ample debates between the Servants of Wrath and the diminishing congregations of Christians left in existence.

The Servants of Wrath's faith is based on an "anger-driven" traditional perception of godhood, compared to that of the Christian survivors, and it is from this that the book derives its name- deus irae, Latin for "God of Wrath". Tibor McMasters is an armless, legless cyborg phocomelus artist who has been commissioned to paint a mural of Lufteufel, though nobody knows where Lufteufel lives, or what he looks like.

The Servants of Wrath leadership commission McMasters to capture Lufteufel in a mural for their new church. The SOWs only have a 3D photograph of Lufteufel, and McMasters is left with no choice but to embark on a deadly "pilg" (pilgrimage) from Wyoming to California to meet Lufteufel first-hand in order to represent him faithfully in the mural. En route, McMasters and other seekers encounter mutant lizards, birds and insects who have evolved sentience, as well as the "Big C", a decaying artificial intelligence that also survived the war; it survives by consuming humans for their trace elements.

While trying to remove shrapnel from his forehead, Lufteufel loses consciousness from loss of blood, at which point his intellectually challenged "daughter", Alice, tries to remove some of the blood using a shirt. This leaves a bloody imprint on the fabric. Alice keeps the shirt because it is the only remaining likeness of his face, leaving her with the only true relic of the God of Wrath, evoking the Christian legend of the veil of Veronica and the artifact known as the Shroud of Turin.

Going under the name “Jack Schuld” (German for "guilt"), Lufteufel kills a dog belonging to McMasters, and McMasters murders Lufteufel without realising his identity. After his death, Alice is visited by Lufteufel's "spirit". He does not speak, but he helps Alice by "lifting the fog in her brain", removing her disability. She sees that his spirit is finally at peace. Alice is not the only human to experience a theophany related to Lufteufel's passing. Another survivor has a vision of a "Palm Tree Garden" equivalent to the Garden of Eden. This implies that Lufteufel may have been a gnostic demiurge, an evil earthbound deity who believes itself omnipotent, but whose abilities are constricted compared to "higher levels" of divinity.

However, McMasters has no knowledge of Lufteufel's death or of the alleged visions related to his death. He is tricked by his (Christian) companion Pete into using an elderly dying alcoholic vagrant for the likeness of Lufteufel for the commissioned church mural, which is prominently featured in leading Servants of Wrath institutions. The mural's survival is a tacit argument that religious belief is often based on mythological accretions, which may not be valid interpretations of decisive events in the history of that faith.

== Sources ==
- Levack, Daniel J. H. (1983). Amber Dreams: A Roger Zelazny Bibliography. San Francisco: Underwood/Miller. pp. 29–30. ISBN 0-934438-39-0.
