= Attachment (film) =

2022 film by Gabriel Bier Gislason

- Official poster
- Danish: Natten har øjne
- Directed by: Gabriel Bier Gislason
- Written by: Gabriel Bier Gislason
- Produced by: Thomas Heinesen
- Starring: Josephine Park; Ellie Kendrick; Sofie Gråbøl; David Dencik
- Music by: Johan Carøe
- Distributed by: TrustNordisk
- Release dates: June 8, 2022 (Tribeca Film Festival); July 28, 2022 (Denmark); February 9, 2023 (Shudder)
- Running time: 105 minutes
- Country: Denmark
- Language: English

Attachment (Danish: Natten har øjne) is a 2022 Danish romantic horror film directed and written by Gabriel Bier Gislason and produced by Thomas Heinesen. It was released on Shudder on February 9, 2023. The film marked Gislason's directorial debut.

== Plot ==
Attachment tells the story of Maja, a washed-up actress from Denmark, who falls in love with Leah, a Jewish academic from London, England. When Leah suffers a mysterious seizure, Maja accompanies her back to London to help with her recovery. However, once there, Maja begins to suspect that something sinister is at play, particularly involving Leah's overbearing mother, Chana. As Maja uncovers the truth, she finds herself entangled in a web of supernatural occurrences rooted in Jewish folklore, forcing her to confront dark forces to save the woman she loves^{.}

== Cast ==
- Josephine Park as Maja
- Ellie Kendrick as Leah
- Sofie Gråbøl as Chana
- David Dencik as Lev

== Background and release ==
Attachment marked Gabriel Bier Gislason's directorial debut. He previously directed short films Purple Haze and Samuel's Getting Hitched. Thomas Heinesen from Nordisk Film produced the film. On May 17, 2021, TrustNordisk announced that it would take care of international distribution. In June 2022, after premiering at the Tribeca Film Festival, Nordisk Film released the international trailer. Attachment was released in Denmark on July 28, 2022. Another trailer was released by Shudder in September.

== Reception ==
On the review aggregator website Rotten Tomatoes, 95% of 58 critics' reviews are positive, with an average rating of 7.2/10. The website's consensus reads: "A possession thriller that knows the devil's in the details, Attachment scares some fresh angles out of a well-worn horror subgenre." Metacritic, which uses a weighted average, assigned the film a score of 64 out of 100, based on 8 critics, indicating "generally favorable" reviews.

== Accolades ==
The film received three nominations at the 40th Robert Awards for Best Actress in a Leading Role (Josephine Park), Best Actor in a Supporting Role (David Dencik) and Best Score (Johan Carøe).
