= The Holiday Sitter =

2022 American-Canadian romantic comedy television film

- Genre: Romantic comedy Christmas; LGBTQ
- Written by: Greg Baldwin; Tracy Andreen; Jonathan Bennett
- Directed by: Ali Liebert
- Starring: Jonathan Bennett; George Krissa
- Theme music composer: Russ Howard
- Countries of origin: Canada; United States
- Original language: English

Production
- Producer: Navid Soofi
- Cinematography: Mike Kam
- Editor: Jason Nielsen
- Running time: 84 minutes
- Production companies: Hallmark Channel; Johnson Production Group; Manmaid Productions

Original release
- Network: Hallmark Channel; W Network
- Release: December 11, 2022

The Holiday Sitter is an American-Canadian romantic comedy television film that premiered on the Hallmark Channel on December 11, 2022. It is the first LGBTQ-themed film broadcast by the network in its annual lineup of Christmas-themed romance films. Directed by Ali Liebert, it stars Jonathan Bennett as Sam Dalton, a single and commitment-phobic gay man who is roped into taking care of his sister Kathleen's (Chelsea Hobbs) kids just before Christmas, only to find himself drawn into a romance with Jason DeVito (George Krissa), his sister's neighbour, after asking for his help.

The cast also includes Everett Andres, Mila Morgan, Matthew James Dowden, Gabrielle Rose, Matty Finochio, Amy Goodmurphy, Robert Wisden, Bella Leonardo, Todd Matthews, Rick Dobran, Andy Rukes and Nathan Parrott.

Bennett, also one of the film's writers and producers, described the film as having been inspired by the desire to make a gay version of Uncle Buck.

The film was shot in the Langley, British Columbia, area in summer 2022. It premiered on December 11, 2022, on The Hallmark Channel in the United States and W Network in Canada.

The film received a GLAAD Media Award nomination for Outstanding Film, Streaming or Television at the 34th GLAAD Media Awards in 2023.
