= Anwen O'Driscoll =

Canadian actress

- Born: July 4, 1999 (age 27); Lindsay, Ontario
- Occupation: Actress
- Years active: 2012–present

Anwen O'Driscoll is a Canadian actress. Her roles include Jaime in the romantic film You Can Live Forever and Taylor in the CBC Television/The CW series Burden of Truth.

== Early life ==
O'Driscoll was born in Lindsay, Ontario, and immersed in theatre from a young age. Her father is an actor and her mother is the director and writer Altaire Gural. As a child, she began performing at the Lindsay Little Theatre alongside her three siblings. When O'Driscoll was fifteen the family moved to a horse farm near Dunsford, where they kept upwards of 30 horses and her mother was a riding coach. The actress Star Slade lived with the family when she was a teen.

== Career ==
O'Driscoll began her career in 2012, at the age of eleven, with an appearance on the teen sitcom Life With Boys. She also had a leading role in the children's series Emerald Code, before her breakout role in the 2018 CBC series Burden of Truth. O'Driscoll plays Taylor Matheson, a high school student who falls ill after a mysterious illness plagues a small town. While appearing in Burden of Truth, O'Driscoll had a recurring role in October Faction, a supernatural television series from Netflix , and performed in the Starz series American Gods and the short film Left for Dead: The Ashley Reeves Story.

O'Driscoll starred in the 2022 film You Can Live Forever, alongside June Laporte. O'Driscoll portrays Jaime, a queer teen sent to live with a devout Jehovah's Witness community in rural Quebec, where she forms a romantic relationship with the daughter of the congregation's leader. Critically well received, the film was a selection at the 2022 Tribeca Film Festival and was nominated for Outstanding Directorial Achievement - Feature Film, at the 2022 Directors Guild of Canada awards.

O'Driscoll continued to act in the independent films No Safe Haven (2023), To Hold the Night (2024), The Bearded Girl (2025), and This Time (2025). Since 2025 she has portrayed Riri Timurov, a main cast member in the Netflix series Bet, based on the Japanese manga Kakegurui - Compulsive Gambler.

== Personal life ==
O'Driscoll is based in Toronto, Canada. She identifies as queer.

== Filmography ==
=== Film ===
Year	Title	Role	Notes
2017	Flint	Kaylie Walters	
2018	Honey Bee	Lindsay	
2021	Left for Dead: The Ashley Reeves Story	Ashley Reeves	Short
2021	The Good Father: The Martin MacNeill Story	Alexis	
2022	You Can Live Forever	Jaime	
2023	No Safe Haven	Harper Tomkins	
2024	To Hold the Night	Nadine	Short
2025	The Bearded Girl	Cleo	
2025	This Time	Grace Mitchum	

=== Television ===
Year	Title	Role	Notes
2012	Life with Boys	Fiona	Episode: "Fashion Faux Pas with Boys"
2017-2019	Emerald Code	Lana	40 episodes
2018-2021	Burden of Truth	Taylor Matheson	30 episodes
2020	Nurses	Gabi Gonzalez	2 episodes
2020	October Faction	Cathy	6 episodes
2021	American Gods	Sophie	Episode: "A Winter's Tale"
2021	Hudson & Rex	Katie Davidow	Episode: "Endless Summer"
2025	Law & Order Toronto: Criminal Intent	Alice Temple	Episode: "Tango Romeo"
2025	Bet	Riri	10 episodes
