= The Light of Days =

Non-fiction book by Judy Batalion (2021)

- Author: Judy Batalion
- Language: English
- Publisher: William Morrow
- Publication date: 2021

The Light of Days: The Untold Story of Women Resistance Fighters in Hitler's Ghettos is a 2021 non-fiction book by Canadian writer Judy Batalion.

== Reception ==
Kirkus Reviews called the book a "resounding history of Jewish women who fought the German invaders in World War II" and a "welcome addition to the literature of the Shoah and of anti-Nazi resistance." Diane Cole of the Wall Street Journal wrote that the book "does not flinch from describing the wanton acts of Nazi-inflicted cruelty and torture these women witnessed and endured," calling the book a "well-researched and riveting chronicle."

Julia M. Klein of the Boston Globe wrote that the book "takes readers deep into the psyches of these women" and that Batalion's "research is prodigious, and her dedication to her story obvious and moving. But the book’s very scope — its huge cast of characters, geographical sweep, and mix of chronological and thematic organization — may deter less committed readers." Writing for The New York Times, Sonia Purnell said the book "pulses with both rage and pride," but that Batalion's "desire to pay tribute to as many as possible is understandable, but a simpler narrative with fewer subjects might have been even more powerful."
