= I Don't Want to Be Dust =

- Mexican theatrical release poster
- Directed by: Iván Löwenberg
- Written by: Iván Löwenberg
- Produced by: Iván Löwenberg; Facundo Escudero Salinas; Aida Herrerias; Elsa Reyes; Ricardo Goria Tamer
- Starring: Bego Sainz
- Cinematography: Rodrigo Calderón García
- Edited by: Damian Tetelbaum
- Music by: Nicolás Deluca
- Production companies: Anomia; Centro de Estudios en Ciencias de la Comunicacion; Pensilvania Films; Pierrot Films; Zensky Cine
- Release dates: November 15, 2022 (CIFF); December 22, 2022 (Argentina); January 4, 2024 (Mexico)
- Running time: 85 minutes
- Countries: Mexico; Argentina
- Language: Spanish

I Don't Want to Be Dust (Spanish: No quiero ser polvo) is a 2022 drama film written, co-produced and directed by Iván Löwenberg. An international co-production between Mexico and Argentina, It stars Bego Sainz as a woman who, in her meditation class, is convinced that a great cataclysm will strike humanity, so she seeks to warn her family.

== Synopsis ==
Bego decides to give up her life plans to take care of household chores. She's bored and afraid of being inconsequential, but her world changes when the meditation group she attends announces a major cataclysm: three days of darkness.

== Cast ==
- Bego Sainz as Bego
- Anahí Allué as Adriana
- Agustina Quinci as Xóchitl
- Romina Coccio as Martita
- Eduardo Azuri as Roberto
- Manuel Poncelis as Cemetery caretaker
- Mónika Rojas as Yolanda
- Luis Felipe Castellanos as Silvito
- J.C. Montes-Roldan as Richard
- Gerardo Monzalvo as Joel
- Iván Lowenberg as Iván
- Rodrigo Cuevas as Fer
- Mariana Leon Lambarri as Magdita
- Ilse Miranda as Rosy
- Luciana Islas as Estefanía
- Magda Vizcaíno as Teacher (voice)
- Edurne Keel as Announcer 1
- Ingrid Lowenberg as Announcer 2
- Keyla Wood as Announcer 3

== Production ==
Principal photography lasted 15 days in Mexico amid the COVID-19 pandemic.

== Release ==
I Don't Want to Be Dust had its world premiere on November 15, 2022, at the 44th Cairo International Film Festival, then was screened on April 25, 2023, at the 15th Milwaukee Film Festival, and on October 4, 2023, at the 7th Black Canvas Contemporary Film Festival.

The film was released commercially on December 22, 2022, in Argentine theaters, and on January 4, 2024, in Mexican theaters.

== Accolades ==
Year	Award / Festival	Category	Recipient	Result	Ref.
2022	44th Cairo International Film Festival	Golden Pyramid Award	I Don't Want to Be Dust	Nominated	
2023	15th Milwaukee Film Festival	Audience Award - Feature Film	I Don't Want to Be Dust	Nominated	
2023	19th Monterrey International Film Festival	Best Mexican Fiction Feature Film	I Don't Want to Be Dust	Nominated	
2023	7th Black Canvas Contemporary Film Festival	Mexico Dentro Del Canvas - Best Film	I Don't Want to Be Dust	Nominated	
2023	12th Feratum International Fantastic Film Festival	Mexican Fiction Feature Film Competition - Best Fiction Film	I Don't Want to Be Dust	Won	
2023	12th Feratum International Fantastic Film Festival	Best Direction	I Don't Want to Be Dust	Won	
