= Andrzej Szwan =

Polish entertainer, photo model and drag queen

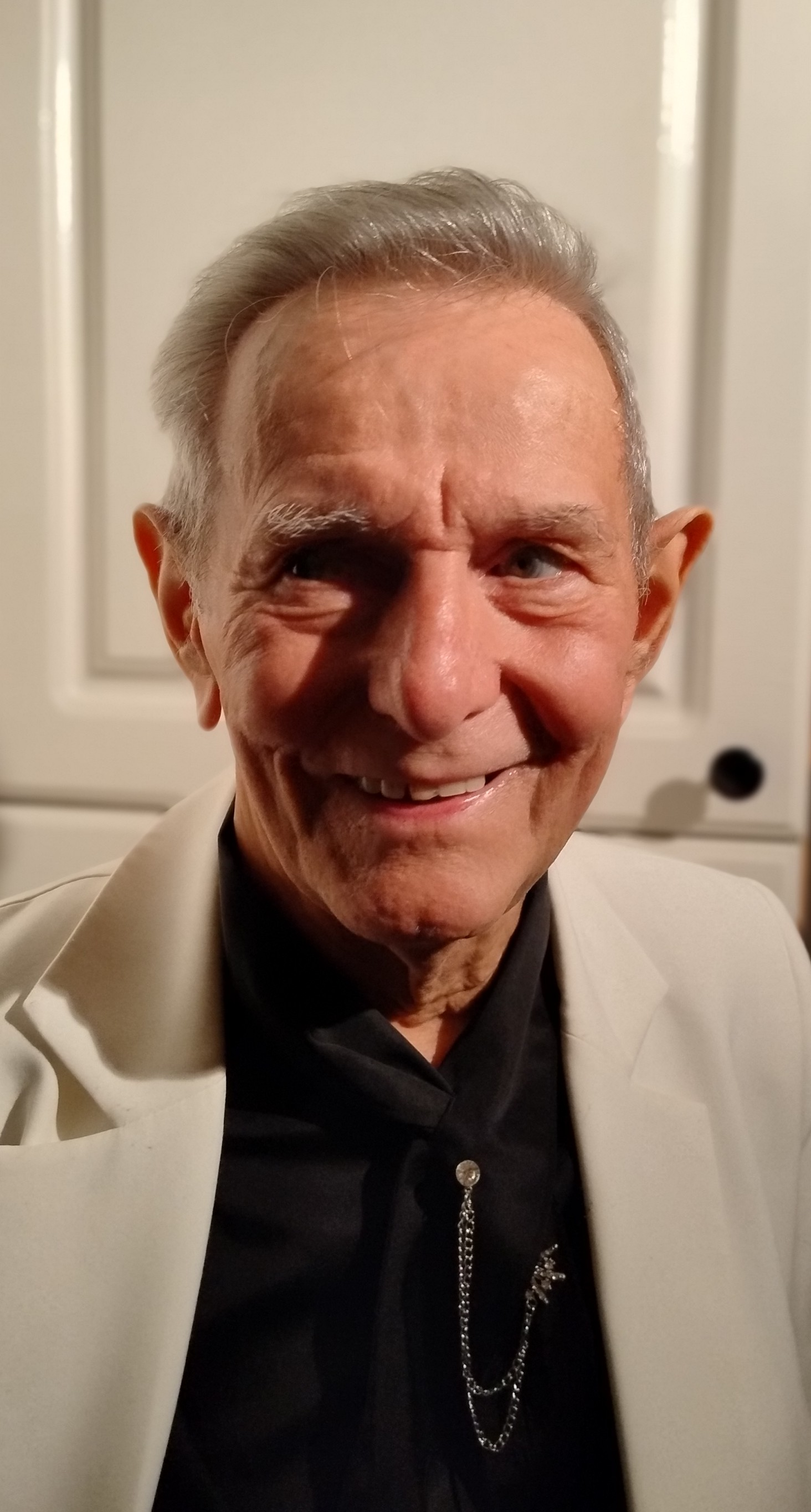
- Andrzej Szwan (2025)
- Born: 16 August 1938 (age 87); Warsaw, Poland
- Other names: Lulla La Polaca
- Years active: 2012-present

Andrzej Szwan (born August 16, 1938, in Warsaw, Poland) is a Polish entertainer and photo model, performing as a drag queen under the pseudonym Lulla la Polaca.

== Early life ==
Szwan was born in Warsaw into a family of Jewish origin. After the outbreak of World War II he was sent to the Warsaw Ghetto, from which he was evacuated through the wall. He was originally taken in by the Zając family, and eventually found himself in the care of his father's sister, Janina. Her husband, Apolinary, was a member of the Home Army and an activist of the anti-fascist underground. Young Szwan began to treat his adoptive parents as biological. After the end of the war, he grew up in the district of Praga. In 1956, he passed his high school final exams and then applied to study at the Aleksander Zelwerowicz's State Higher Theater School. However, due to his mother's illness, he was forced to give up further education and started working at the Capital Transport Company for Internal Trade. Later, he started law studies at the University of Warsaw. As a government official, he worked on contracts, among others, in Libya and Iraq, thanks to which he managed to escape the governmental initiative of infiltration of the queer community of Poland and persecution of its members, known as Operation Hyacinth.

== Drag performances and activism ==
In 2010, thanks to Kim Lee, he made his debut on stage as a drag queen, and became known as the oldest active Polish drag queen. He performs in clubs and festivals related to the queer community. Szwan's photos appeared, among others, in Vogue magazine. He also took part in the Levi's Pride 2021 campaign and the 2024 promotional action of the Polin museum, asking Varsovians to pin on yellow paper daffodils as a token of remembrance of Warsaw Ghetto uprising. In 2021, he appeared in Miuosh's music video for the song "Klucze". He is openly gay and an activist for the rights of non-heteronormative people.
