= Dino at the Beach =

- Directed by: Josh Cox
- Written by: Josh Cox
- Produced by: Josh Cox
- Starring: Mateo Correa; Devon McDowell
- Cinematography: Josh Cox
- Edited by: Josh Cox
- Production company: Americana Pictures
- Distributed by: Americana Pictures
- Release date: November 11, 2022
- Running time: 10 minutes
- Country: United States
- Language: English

Dino at the Beach is a 2022 homoerotic short film written and directed by Josh Cox. Set in 1960s New England, it stars Mateo Correa and Devon McDowell. The story follows the unexpected sensual connection between two men one afternoon on a deserted beach in late summertime.

== Plot ==
During the last days of summer, young Dino is asleep and alone on a beach mid-afternoon somewhere in 1960s New England. Soon, another young man walks up to him, gently awaking him with his voice and asks to leave his belongings with Dino. Dino soon watches the man vanish into the water, somewhat awestruck by his beauty.

Later, Dino reads Gore Vidal's 1948 novel The City and the Pillar further up on the beach when the stranger returns from his swim. The pair make small talk and the stranger confesses his departure from New England to go back home the following day before bluntly asking Dino if he would like to hookup. After quickly suppressing his shock, Dino agrees and follows the man into the woods where they passionately make love.

Afterward, the pair exchange names and we learn the alluring stranger's name is Sebastian. The ambiguous ending leaves one lingering on the acquaintances' final kiss, and wondering what more could become of this random amorous exchange.

== Cast ==
- Mateo Correa as Sebastian
- Devon McDowell as Dino

== Production ==
The film was shot on Cape Cod on 16mm film. According to the director, both actors had never met prior to the start of the shoot, adding to the sense of wonderment the characters feel upon meeting.

== Reception ==
Dino at the Beach has received a positive response from film critics, from Kentucker Audley praising the short as a "sensual tone poem" that feels "timeless". Film review publication Film Threat references the film's beauty being shot on film, as well as the actors' clear chemistry. Another review publication declares the film evokes a sense of desire and tenderness.
