= You Can Live Forever =

- Theatrical release poster
- Directed by: Sarah Watts; Mark Slutsky
- Written by: Sarah Watts; Mark Slutsky
- Produced by: Robert Vroom
- Starring: Anwen O'Driscoll; June Laporte; Liane Balaban; Antoine Yared
- Cinematography: Gayle Ye
- Edited by: Amélie Labrèche
- Music by: CFCF
- Production company: Prospector Films
- Distributed by: Mongrel Media; Métropole Films (Canada)
- Release date: June 11, 2022 (Tribeca)
- Running time: 96 minutes
- Country: Canada
- Languages: English; French

You Can Live Forever is a 2022 Canadian romantic drama film, written and directed by Sarah Watts and Mark Slutsky. Set in the 1990s, the film stars Anwen O'Driscoll as Jaime, a teenager who is sent to live with her aunt Beth (Liane Balaban) after her father's death; Beth is married to Jean-François (Antoine Yared), a devoutly religious Jehovah's Witness who aspires to be a leader of his congregation. Jaime soon develops a romantic relationship with Marike (June Laporte), another young woman in the Jehovah's Witness community.

The film's cast also includes Hasani Freeman, Deragh Campbell, Marc-Antoine Auger, Tim Campbell, Xavier Roberge, Lenni-Kim Lalande, and Juliette Gariépy.

The film was inspired in part by Watts' own upbringing in a Jehovah's Witness community, but Watts has indicated that it is not autobiographical. The film entered production in fall 2021, with filming taking place in Montreal and Saguenay.

The film premiered in June 2022 at the Tribeca Film Festival. You Can Live Forever was also screened at the Reelout Queer Film Festival in February 2023.

== Plot ==
After the sudden death of her father, Jaime Buckley is sent by her mother to live with her aunt Beth and uncle Jean-François in a small town in Quebec, home to a devout Jehovah's Witness congregation. Jaime is reluctantly convinced to attend the congregation's meeting, where she catches the eye of Marike, the daughter of the congregation's leader, Frank. The two strike a connection, and Marike invites Jaime to dinner with her family, meeting Marike's older sister Amanda. Jaime tells Marike about her dream to travel to Europe to see cities like London, Barcelona, Prague, and Lucca, in particular mentioning the Guinigi Tower. Marike briefly tells Jaime about her mother before revealing that her mother left the Jehovah's Witness community and is therefore treated as dead.

At school, Jaime makes friends with another student named Nate, who is not a member of the Jehovah's Witnesses and is incredulous about their non-celebration of occasions like birthdays or Christmas. Marike invites Jaime to see the Cyclorama of Jerusalem, where she tells Jaime about the coming paradise. Jaime attends dinner again with Marike's family, who ask if she has been baptized. She spends the night with Marike, and is surprised at their physical closeness. The next day, Marike notices Jaime's interactions with Nate and later questions her relationship with him before giving her a drawing of the Guinigi Tower.

After spending a day together on field service, Jaime and Marike's friendship becomes much closer. At the next meeting, Marike's boyfriend Marc-Olivier introduces Jaime to his friend Simon and Amanda becomes suspicious of Jaime's influence on Marike. Nate finds out that it is Jaime's birthday and takes her out to a cáfe for cake, but Marike and Amanda run across the pair. Jaime is told by Beth and Jean-Francois that due to her perceived influence over Marike, the two will only be allowed to interact in supervised environments such as Bible study. Marike gives Jaime a small piece of a meteorite as a gift, and Jaime tells her that her mother's condition has improved and that she is wanted back at home.

After a Bible study session, the pair are walking home when Marike asks her to pray. Marike says a short prayer before kissing Jaime and walking away, and the two agree to go out on field service again. Marike suggests that they go on a double date with Marc-Olivier and Simon. At the movie with the boys, the two briefly sneak away together to the washroom, then again outside Jaime's house when she forgets her scarf. Marike opens up to Amanda about still thinking about their mother. Later, during the next school day, Jaime convinces Marike to skip class, and they hold a mock baptism in a bathtub.

While resting together, Jaime tells Marike that she was previously in a relationship with another girl, and points out that Marike still has a boyfriend. Later, the pair are walking together and stop to look at a shop. Jaime reassures Marike that her previous relationship is in the past and the two kiss; they are spotted by Jean-François, who informs Frank. Jaime meets Marike in the loft and asks if she will leave with her, and Marike agrees to talk to her father and smooth things over.

At the next meeting, Frank unexpectedly announces Marike's engagement to Marc-Olivier, causing Jaime to run from the room. A confused and distraught Jaime later confronts Marike, who said that the marriage was her idea, believing that she and Jaime can be together in paradise. Jaime responds that she cannot go along with this plan as she does not share the same religious beliefs, and Marike replies that she can believe enough for both of them. Following this, Jaime moves back to Ontario.

In an epilogue set an unspecified number of years later, Jaime is now in college and returns to the small town to visit Beth but is picked up at the train station by Marike. Jaime meets Marike's infant son, Luca, and tells her that she traveled to Europe as the pair had previously talked about. Marike tells Jaime that she secretly had Beth give her the latter's postcards to read. As Jaime is about to get out of the car, Marike silently stops her. Jaime asks "Not gonna let me go?" to which Marike shakes her head; Jaime begins to cry.

== Cast ==
- Anwen O'Driscoll as Jaime
- June Laporte as Marike
- Liane Balaban as Beth
- Antoine Yared as Jean-François (JF)
- Hasani Freeman as Nate
- Tim Campbell as Frank
- Deragh Campbell as Amanda
- Lenni Kim as Simon

== Reception ==
=== Critical response ===
On the review aggregator website Rotten Tomatoes, 90% of 42 critics' reviews are positive, with an average rating of 7.1/10. The website's consensus reads: "Narratively subtle and beautifully acted, You Can Live Forever finds soulful drama at the intersection of sexual orientation and religious faith." Metacritic, which uses a weighted average, assigned the film a score of 68 out of 100, based on 7 critics, indicating "generally favorable" reviews.

=== Awards ===
The film was shortlisted for Best Direction in a Feature Film at the 2022 Directors Guild of Canada awards.
