= Planet for Transients =

1953 science fiction short story by Philip K. Dick

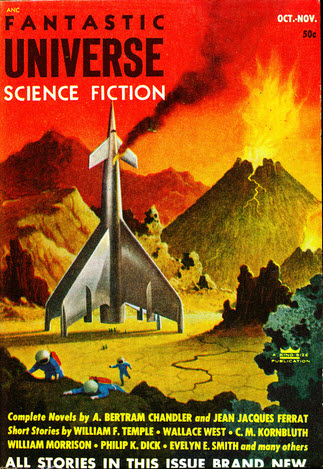
"Planet of Transients" was originally published in the October–November 1953 issue of Fantastic Universe.

"Planet for Transients" is a 1953 science fiction short story by American writer Philip K. Dick. The story was originally published in the October–November 1953 issue of Fantastic Universe. The story also appears in We Can Remember It for You Wholesale (The Collected Short Stories of Philip K. Dick, Vol. 2) (formerly entitled Second Variety). The author's original title for the story was "The Itinerants".

Elements of this story appear in the novel Deus Irae, written by Dick and Roger Zelazny.

== Plot summary ==
The story is set in a future where humans of the original variety wear lead-lined spacesuits and take other precautions against the lethal levels of surface radiation on Earth. Other varieties of human have evolved to cope with the radiation levels, such as "bugs", "runners", "toads", and others. Those varieties speak and think as do the original variety of humans, yet their bodies are radically different. These body types have evolved as necessary modifications for survival on a highly radioactive Earth. The planet is far from dead. Earth teems with plant and animal life, yet the original type of humans must live underground and can only visit the surface with protective equipment.

In the story, the protagonist Trent is on a mission to find another isolated group of humans like himself. Before Trent makes contact with people like himself, he encounters several of these mutant types, many of whom have never seen a human of the original type before.
