= June Laporte =

Television and film actor

- Laporte at the 2026 Toronto International Film Festival.

June Laporte is a television and film actor. They are known for their film roles as Marike in You Can Live Forever (2022) and Isis in We Forgot to Break Up (2024).

== Early life and career ==
Laporte was raised in Houston, Texas. They studied acting in New York before settling in Vancouver in 2017. After acting in several short films, Laporte came to recognition with their role in the 2022 Canadian film You Can Live Forever. Laporte portrays Marike, the daughter of a devout Jehovah's Witness community leader in rural 1990s Quebec, who develops a secret romance with queer teenager and outsider Jaime. The film was a selection at the 2022 Tribeca Film Festival and was nominated for Outstanding Directorial Achievement - Feature Film, at the 2022 Directors Guild of Canada awards.

Laporte appeared in a 2022 episode of Hulu series The Dropout, about Theranos founder Elizabeth Holmes. They portrayed Ravah in season 5 of Star Trek: Discovery, and Rita in the Hallmark film Mid-Love Crisis. In 2024, they starred as Isis in the film We Forgot to Break Up, about the 2000s Toronto indie music scene. Laporte had a minor role in the HBO Max series The Last of Us (2025).

== Filmography ==
=== Television ===
Year	Title	Role	Notes
2019	iZombie	Freylich Kid #4	2 episodes
2019	V.C. Andrews' Heaven	Leigh VanVoreen	1 episode
2021	V.C. Andrews' Landy Family	Pearl	1 episode
2021	When Calls the Heart	Rachel Thom	5 episodes
2022	The Dropout	Tess	1 episode
2024	The Irrational	Dahlia Banning	1 episode
2024	Star Trek: Discovery	Ravah	1 episode
2025	Wild Cards	Sierra	1 episode
2025	The Last of Us	June	1 episode

=== Film ===
Year	Title	Role	Notes
2012	Write Your Way Out	Amy	Short, also credited as a writer
2015	Clinger	Fern Petersen	
2017	The Art of Us	Casey	TV movie
2017	The Speed of Light	Teen Rose	Short
2018	Extra-Ordinary Amy	Amy	Short
2018	West of Hell	Annie Hargraves	
2018	Freaky Friday	Monica Yang	TV movie
2019	Coin-Operated Boy	Lydia	Short
2019	Spiral	Kayla	
2022	You Can Live Forever	Marike	
2022	Mid-Love Crisis	Rita Quinn	TV movie
2023	Make Me Feel	June	Short
2023	Aging Out	Annie	Short
2024	We Forgot to Break Up	Isis	
2024	Something's More Than One Thing	Jessica	
2025	Field Sketches	Molly	
