= George Krissa =

Canadian actor

- Born: Lashburn, Saskatchewan, Canada
- Education: MacEwan University
- Occupations: Actor, singer
- Years active: 2010–present
- Website: www.georgekrissa.com

George Krissa is a Canadian actor and singer, best known for his performance as Jason DeVito in the 2022 romantic comedy film The Holiday Sitter. He is gay and has spoken about the importance of LGBTQ+ representation in media.

== Early life ==
Krissa was born and raised in Lashburn, Saskatchewan. He studied music at MacEwan University in Edmonton, Alberta.

== Career ==
=== Musical theatre ===
He began his career in musical theatre, appearing in productions such as Rent, West Side Story and Million Dollar Quartet in Western Canada before becoming known in Eastern Canada for performances as Rocky in the Stratford Festival production of The Rocky Horror Show in 2018, and Tommy Albright in the Shaw Festival production of Brigadoon in 2019.

In November 2023, he made his cabaret debut in New York City

In 2023, Krissa starred as Anatole in the Canadian premiere production of Natasha, Pierre & The Great Comet of 1812. The musical was presented by Crow's Theatre in Toronto, and opened 5 December 2023. Although it was originally scheduled to close on 28 January 2024, the musical was continually extended due to popular demand before eventually closing on 24 March 2024. Krissa reprised his role of Anatole when the production was picked up by Mirvish Productions, where it played at the Royal Alexandra Theatre between July 15 and August 24, 2025. Following this, Krissa starred as Jimmy Ray Dobbs in a Canadian production of Bright Star presented and produced by Garner Theatre Productions and Mirvish Productions. The production opened at the CAA Theatre on September 30, 2025, and was scheduled to close on September 26, 2025, but it was extended for one week through November 2, 2025 due to popular demand.

In June 2025, it was announced that Krissa would star as William Shakespeare in the Canadian production of & Juliet. The musical will play at the Royal Alexandra Theatre, and begin performances on December 2, 2025.

=== TV and film ===
In 2022, Krissa starred in The Holiday Sitter, which marked the first time a same-sex couple has been featured as the main romance in a Hallmark Channel Christmas-themed romance film.

He has also had supporting roles in film and television, including appearances in Murdoch Mysteries and Coroner.

== Credits ==
=== Theater ===
Year	Production	Role	Location	Category	Ref.
2010	Rent	Roger	La Cite	Regional	
2016	West Side Story	Tony	Maclab Theatre	Citadel Theatre	
2016	Million Dollar Quartet	Elvis Presley	Globe Theatre	Regional	
2017	Million Dollar Quartet	Elvis Presley	Segal Centre for Performing Arts	Regional	
2018	The Music Man	Ewart Dunlop	Festival Theatre	Stratford Festival	
2018	The Rocky Horror Show	Rocky	Avon Theatre	Stratford Festival	
2019	Cyrano de Bergerac	u/s Christian	Royal George Theatre	Shaw Festival	
2019	The Horse and His Boy	Rabadash	Festival Theatre	Shaw Festival	
2019	Brigadoon	Tommy Albright	Festival Theatre	Shaw Festival	
2023–2024	Natasha, Pierre and the Great Comet of 1812	Anatole	Crow's Theatre	Canadian Premiere	
2025	Natasha, Pierre and the Great Comet of 1812	Anatole	Royal Alexandra Theatre	Mirvish Productions	
2025	Bright Star	Jimmy Ray Dobbs	CAA Theatre		

=== Television ===
Year	Show	Role	Notes
2014	Close Encounters	Jim Romanksy	Episode S1.E2: "Fire in the Sky/Arizona Objects"
2016	Forbidden: Dying for Love	Eric	Episode S1.E3: "An Affair to Forget"
2021	Murdoch Mysteries	Rosedale Constable	Episode S14.E9: "The .38 Murdoch Special"
2022	Coroner	LJND	Episode S4.E8: "LJND"
2022	Road Trip Romance	Franklyn	TV movie
2022	Trapped with My Husband	Cameron	TV movie
2022	The Holiday Sitter	Jason DeVito	TV movie

=== Film ===
Year	Title	Role	Notes
2016	Bed of the Dead	Fred	
