= Secret Location =

Secret Location was a content studio that won a Cannes Lion Award and multiple Emmy awards; spanned across web, mobile, tablet and other platforms such as Virtual and Augmented Reality; and, based in Toronto and LA.

== Background ==
Secret Location was launched in 2009 by founders James Milward, Ryan Andal and Pietro Gagliano. It has content studios in Canada and the US.

Secret Location staff have worked with clients including Samsung, Red Bull Canada, TELUS, Toyota, Cadbury, Air Canada, Mitsubishi, National Film Board of Canada, Stanfield's, War Child, Focus Features, Fox Studios, NBC, Warner Bros., Disney XD, BET, PBS/Frontline, Nickelodeon/Teen Nick, Family Channel, CBC, MTV UK, YTV, CTV, TELETOON, City TV, Global TV, Showcase, OLN, MGM, Endemol, Sony Pictures / Television, eOne, Shaftesbury Films, and Temple Street.

In 2014, eOne made an equity investment in the studio, and in 2016, eOne fully acquired Secret Location.

In 2019, eOne and Secret Location were acquired by Hasbro and in 2022, Hasbro announced the close of Secret Location and its merging into the larger Hasbro organization, along with laying off all studio employees.

Since then, they have partnered with VRSE and LA talent agency UTA.

== Awards ==
The company is a two-time Emmy winner. Secret Location won its first International Emmy for an interactive episode og the Canadian TV Series Endgame. In 2015 they won a Primetime Creative Arts Emmy Award in the User Experience and Visual Design category for a tie-in to the drama series Sleepy Hollow. It was the first time a virtual reality project had been awarded an Emmy. The company is a three-time Webby Award winner, 13-time Canadian Screen Award/Gemini winner, and has won awards from AToMiC, Creativity International, CASSIES, the Marketing Awards, and Banff World Media festival.
