= 2009 Toronto International Film Festival =

Annual Canadian film festival

- Festival poster
- Opening film: Creation
- Closing film: The Young Victoria
- Location: Toronto, Ontario, Canada
- Hosted by: Toronto International Film Festival Group
- No. of films: 300–400
- Festival date: September 10, 2009–September 19, 2009
- Language: International
- Website: tiff.net
- 2010 2008

The 34th annual Toronto International Film Festival (TIFF) was held in Toronto, Ontario, Canada between September 10 and September 19, 2009. The opening night gala presented the Charles Darwin biography Creation. The Young Victoria, based on the early years of Queen Victoria, closed the festival on September 19.

== About the 2009 Festival ==
TIFF is a non-profit organization whose goal is to change the way people look at the world through film. The festival is Canada's largest film festival, receiving 4,209 submissions in 2008. Of this total, 312 films were screened coming from 64 different countries. TIFF creates an annual economic impact of $135 million CAD. Aided by over 2,000 volunteers, 100 full-time staff members and 500 seasonal or part-time staff are responsible for organizing the festival. Two screenings of each of the invited films are presented to the public and at least one screening is provided for press and industry. The 2009 festival contained 19 different Programmes, or categories of films. After the ten days of film, the Awards reception was held at Intercontinental Hotel on Front Street in Toronto.

Perhaps the most prestigious of the awards was bestowed to Lee Daniels's Precious: based on the novel Push by Sapphire. This award was the 2009 Cadillac People's Choice Award and is based solely on votes by Festival audiences. This award carries a $15,000 cash prize and also comes with a custom made award from Cadillac. It is widely considered to be the most prestigious because it has had the greatest impact on audiences and inspires film distributors to sign the winning film for larger international releases. Last year's winner Slumdog Millionaire directed by Danny Boyle, went on to reap huge international spotlight which culminated at the 2009 Academy Awards where it won Best Picture. Lee Daniel's Precious was also a big Oscar contender as it was nominated for Best Picture and Best Director, however it lost to The Hurt Locker and its helmer Kathryn Bigelow. The First runner-up was Bruce Beresford's Mao's Last Dancer and the second runner-up was Jean-Pierre Jeunet's Micmacs.

The City of Toronto and Astral Media's The Movie Network Award for Best Canadian Feature Film went to Cairo Time directed by Ruba Nadda. Sponsored by Astral Media's the Movie Network and the City of Toronto, this award came with a cash prize of $30,000.

Future endeavors by the TIFF will be aided by the ongoing construction of TIFF Bell Lightbox, a 1,750,000-square-foot (163,000 m^{2}) facility with an estimated annual economic impact of over $200 million. Complete with 5 cinemas, learning studios, galleries and a rooftop lounge, this will become the hub of TIFF in 2010 when construction is scheduled to be completed.

=== Controversy over Tel Aviv spotlight ===
More than 1,500 people, including prominent filmmakers, academics, and writers signed a letter of protest directed at the Toronto International Film Festival regarding its decision to spotlight Tel Aviv and the work of 10 Israeli filmmakers. The protest leaders emphasized that it is not a call for a boycott. The original protest letter in part reads:

"As members of the Canadian and international film, culture and media arts communities, we are deeply disturbed by [TIFF's] decision to host a celebratory spotlight on Tel Aviv. We protest that TIFF, whether intentionally or not, has become complicit in the Israeli propaganda machine. We do not protest the individual Israeli filmmakers included in City to City, nor do we in any way suggest that Israeli films should be unwelcome at TIFF. However, especially in the wake of this year's brutal assault on Gaza, we object to the use of such an important international festival in staging a propaganda campaign on behalf of what South African Archbishop Desmond Tutu, former US President Jimmy Carter, and UN General Assembly President Miguel d'Escoto Brockmann have all characterized as an apartheid regime."

The signatories and supporters include Ken Loach, David Byrne, Naomi Klein, Alice Walker, Jane Fonda, Wallace Shawn, Danny Glover, John Greyson, Viggo Mortensen and the American Jewish group Jewish Voice for Peace.

John Greyson's letter of protest highlighted an interview "Israeli Consul General Amir Gissin gave to Canadian Jewish News in which he described the TIFF spotlight as a culmination of his year-long Brand Israel campaign, which included ads on buses, radio and television." Greyson claims that "This isn't the right year to celebrate Brand Israel, or to demonstrate an ostrich-like indifference to the realities (cinematic and otherwise) of the region, or to pointedly ignore the international economic boycott campaign against Israel."

The protest letter was met with condemnation by some, such as Simcha Jacobovici, "a Toronto filmmaker who recently moved with his family to Israel, noted in a statement that the Palestinian government in Gaza had recently called a U.N. proposal to teach the Holocaust in Palestinian schools a war crime." Jacobovici asked "Why does [protest supporter John Greyson] want to align himself with Holocaust deniers?" Others accused those who signed the protest letter as engaging in a boycott of Israel films.

Rabbi Marvin Hier, the founder of the Simon Wiesenthal Center, has stated that "it is clear that the script [the protesters] are reading from might as well have been written by Hamas."

Patrick Goldstein, writing in the Los Angeles Times, wrote against the protest and made an analogy to actions by musician Paul Simon:

"At the height of apartheid in South Africa, Paul Simon made "Graceland", an album of glorious music with South African musicians. He was criticized at the time for breaking a worldwide cultural boycott, but Simon believed that exposing the musicians' gifts to the world far outweighed any tacit endorsement his use of South African musicians would have provided for the country's repressive regime. History long ago proved him right. The same openness should apply to a film festival."

In response to the protest, a number of Hollywood stars circulated a counter-protest letter on September 15, 2009. This letter, which appeared simultaneously in the Los Angeles Times and the Toronto Star, included signatories Jerry Seinfeld, Sacha Baron Cohen, Natalie Portman, Jason Alexander, Lisa Kudrow, Lenny Kravitz, Patricia Heaton, Jacob Richler, Noah Richler, George F. Walker and Moses Znaimer. The letter said:

Anyone who has actually seen recent Israeli cinema, movies that are political and personal, comic and tragic, often critical, knows they are in no way a propaganda arm for any government policy. Blacklisting them only stifles the exchange of cultural knowledge that artists should be the first to defend and protect.

Jane Fonda, in a posting on Huffington Post, says that she now regrets some of the language used in the original protest letter and how it "was perhaps too easily misunderstood. It certainly has been wildly distorted. Contrary to the lies that have been circulated, the protest letter was not demonizing Israeli films and filmmakers." She continued writing "the greatest 're-branding' of Israel would be to celebrate that country's long standing, courageous and robust peace movement by helping to end the blockade of Gaza through negotiations with all parties to the conflict, and by stopping the expansion of West Bank settlements. That's the way to show Israel's commitment to peace, not a PR campaign. There will be no two-state solution unless this happens."

== Awards ==
Award	Film	Director
People's Choice Award	Precious	Lee Daniels
People's Choice Award First Runner Up	Mao's Last Dancer	Bruce Beresford
People's Choice Award Second Runner Up	Micmacs	Jean-Pierre Jeunet
People's Choice Award, Documentary Winner	The Topp Twins: Untouchable Girls	Leanne Pooley
People's Choice Award, Documentary Runner Up	Capitalism: A Love Story	Michael Moore
People's Choice Award, Midnight Madness Winner	The Loved Ones	Sean Byrne
People's Choice Award, Midnight Madness Runner Up	Daybreakers	Michael Spierig and Peter Spierig
Best Canadian Feature Film	Cairo Time	Ruba Nadda
Best Canadian Feature Film - Special Jury Citation	The Legacy (La Donation)	Bernard Émond
Best Canadian Short Film	Danse Macabre	Pedro Pires
Best Canadian Short Film - Special Mention	The Armoire	Jamie Travis
Best Canadian First Feature Film	The Wild Hunt	Alexandre Franchi
FIPRESCI Discovery	The Man Beyond the Bridge	Laxmikant Shetgaonkar
FIPRESCI Special Presentations	Hadewijch	Bruno Dumont

== Programme ==
=== Galas ===
- Agora by Alejandro Amenabar
- Chloe by Atom Egoyan
- Coco Chanel and Igor Stravinsky by Jan Kounen
- Cooking with Stella by Dilip Mehta
- Creation by Jon Amiel
- The Damned United by Tom Hooper
- Dil Bole Hadippa by Anurag Singh
- Dorian Gray by Oliver Parker
- Get Low by Aaron Schneider
- I, Don Giovanni by Carlos Saura
- The Imaginarium of Doctor Parnassus by Terry Gilliam
- Max Manus by Espen Sandberg and Joachim Roenning
- The Men Who Stare at Goats by Grant Heslov
- Micmacs by Jean-Pierre Jeunet
- Mother and Child by Rodrigo García
- The Other Woman by Don Roos
- Phantom Pain by Matthias Emcke
- Precious by Lee Daniels
- The Private Lives of Pippa Lee by Rebecca Miller
- What's Your Raashee? by Ashutosh Gowariker
- The Young Victoria by Jean-Marc Vallée

=== Special presentations ===
- Baaria by Giuseppe Tornatore
- Bad Lieutenant: Port of Call New Orleans by Werner Herzog
- The Boys are Back by Scott Hicks
- Bright Star by Jane Campion
- Broken Embraces by Pedro Almodóvar
- Cairo Time by Ruba Nadda
- Capitalism: A Love Story by Michael Moore
- City of Life and Death by Lu Chuan
- Cracks by Jordan Scott
- Defendor by Peter Stebbings
- An Education by Lone Scherfig
- The Front Line by Renato De Maria
- Glorious 39 by Stephen Poliakoff
- Good Hair by Jeff Stilson
- The Good Heart by Dagur Kari
- Hadewijch by Bruno Dumont
- Harry Brown by Daniel Barber
- The Hole by Joe Dante
- Hugh Hefner: Playboy, Activist and Rebel by Brigitte Berman
- I Killed My Mother by Xavier Dolan
- The Informant! by Steven Soderbergh
- The Invention of Lying by Ricky Gervais and Matthew Robinson
- The Joneses by Derrick Borte
- Kamui by Yoichi Sai
- L'affaire Farewell by Christian Carion
- Leaves of Grass by Tim Blake Nelson
- Les derniers jours du monde by Arnaud Larrieu and Jean-Marie Larrieu
- Life During Wartime by Todd Solondz
- London River by Rachid Bouchareb
- Mao's Last Dancer by Bruce Beresford
- Moloch Tropical by Raoul Peck
- Mother by Bong Joon-ho
- My Son, My Son, What Have Ye Done by Werner Herzog
- Mr. Nobody by Jaco Van Dormael
- Ondine by Neil Jordan
- Partir by Catherine Corsini
- Perrier's Bounty by Ian Fitzgibbon
- A Prophet by Jacques Audiard
- The Road by John Hillcoat
- Road, Movie by Dev Benegal
- Scheherazade Tell Me a Story by Yousry Nasrallah
- The Secret in Their Eyes by Juan José Campanella
- A Serious Man by Joel Coen and Ethan Coen
- A Single Man by Tom Ford
- Solitary Man by Brian Koppelman and David Levien
- Soul Kitchen by Fatih Akın
- The Traveller by Ahmed Maher
- Triage by Danis Tanovic
- The Trotsky by Jacob Tierney
- Up in the Air by Jason Reitman
- Valhalla Rising by Nicolas Winding Refn
- Vengeance by Johnnie To
- The Vintner's Luck by Niki Caro
- The Waiting City by Claire McCarthy
- Wheat by He Ping
- Whip It! by Drew Barrymore
- Women Without Men by Shirin Neshat
- Youth in Revolt by Miguel Arteta

=== City to City ===
- Bena by Niv Klainer
- Big Dig by Efraim Kishon
- Big Eyes by Uri Zohar
- The Bubble by Eytan Fox
- A History of Israeli Cinema - Part 1 by Raphael Nadjari
- A History of Israeli Cinema - Part 2 by Raphael Nadjari
- Jaffa by Keren Yedaya
- Kirot by Danny Lerner
- Life According to Agfa by Assi Dayan
- Phobidilia by Yoav Paz and Doron Paz

=== Contemporary World Cinema ===
- 25 Carat by Patxi Amezcua
- Adrift by Bùi Thạc Chuyên
- Ajami by Scandar Copti and Yaron Shani
- At the End of Daybreak by Ho Yuhang
- Backyard by Carlos Carrera
- Balibo by Robert Connolly
- Beyond the Circle by Golam Rabbany
- Blessed by Ana Kokkinos
- Bran Nue Dae by Rachel Perkins
- Castaway on the Moon by Lee Hae-jun
- Cell 211 by Daniel Monzón
- Cole by Carl Bessai
- Deliver Us from Evil by Ole Bornedal
- Dogtooth by Yorgos Lanthimos
- Down for Life by Alan Jacobs
- The Double Hour by Giuseppe Capotondi
- Excited by Bruce Sweeney
- Eyes Wide Open by Haim Tabakman
- Giulia Doesn't Date at Night by Giuseppe Piccioni
- A Gun to the Head by Blaine Thurier
- Heiran by Shalizeh Arefpour
- Help Gone Mad by Boris Khlebnikov
- High Life by Gary Yates
- The House of Branching Love by Mika Kaurismäki
- Huacho by Alejandro Fernández Alemendras
- I Am Not Your Friend by György Pálfi
- If I Knew What You Said by Mike Sandejas
- Jean Charles by Henrique Goldman
- The Last Days of Emma Blank by Alex van Warmerdam
- Like You Know It All by Hong Sangsoo
- Lourdes by Jessica Hausner
- Men on the Bridge by Asli Özge
- My Year Without Sex by Sarah Watt
- Passenger Side by Matt Bissonnette
- Le Père de mes enfants by Mia Hansen-Løve
- Police, Adjective by Corneliu Porumboiu
- Prince of Tears by Yonfan
- Rabia by Sebastián Cordero
- Same Same but Different by Detlev Buck
- Sawasdee Bangkok by Wisit Sasanatieng
- The Search by Wan Ma Cai Dan
- Shameless by Jan Hřebejk
- Slovenian Girl by Damjan Kozole
- Suck by Robert Stefaniuk
- Tales from the Golden Age by Hanno Höfer, Cristian Mungiu, Constantin Popescu, Ioana Uricaru, Răzvan Mărculescu
- Tanner Hall by Francesca Gregorini and Tatiana von Fürstenberg
- The Time That Remains by Elia Suleiman
- V.O.S by Cesc Gay
- The Wind Journeys by Ciro Guerra

=== Discovery ===
- Angel by Margreth Olin
- Applause by Martin Zandvliet
- Bare Essence of Life by Satoko Yokohama
- Beautiful Kate by Rachel Ward
- A Brand New Life by Ounie Lecomte
- The Day Will Come by Susanne Schneider
- The Disappearance of Alice Creed by J Blakeson
- Eamon by Margaret Corkery
- Everyday is a Holiday by Dima El-Horr
- Five Hours from Paris by Leon Pruddovsky
- Gigante by Adrián Biniez
- The Happiest Girl in the World by Radu Jude
- Heliopolis by Ahmad Abdalla
- Le Jour Ou Dieu Est Parti en Voyage by Philippe van Leeuw
- Kelin by Ermek Tursunov
- Last Ride by Glendyn Ivin
- The Man Beyond the Bridge by Laxmikant Shetgaonkar
- My Dog Tulip by Paul Fierlinger and Sandra Fierlinger
- My Tehran for Sale by Granaz Moussavi
- Northless by Rigoberto Perezcano
- La Pivellina by Tizza Covi and Rainer Frimmel
- Samson and Delilah by Warwick Thornton
- Shirley Adams by Oliver Hermanus
- Should I Really Do It? by Ismail Necmi
- La Soga by Josh Crook
- Toad's Oil by Kōji Yakusho
- Together by Matias Armand Jordal
- The Unloved by Samantha Morton

=== Future Projections ===
- The Butcher's Shop by Philip Haas
- Cathedral by Marco Brambilla
- The Death of Tom by Glenn Ligon
- I'm Feeling Lucky by Samuel Chow
- Teenager Hamlet 2006 by Margaux Williamson
- Utopia Suite by Clive Holden
- When the Gods Came Down to Earth by Srinivas Krishna

=== Masters ===
- Air Doll by Hirokazu Kore-eda
- Antichrist by Lars von Trier
- Eccentricities of a Blonde-haired Girl by Manoel de Oliveira
- Hotel Atlantico by Suzana Amaral
- Janala by Buddhadeb Dasgupta
- The Legacy by Bernard Émond
- Wild Grass by Alain Resnais

=== Midnight Madness ===
- Bitch Slap by Rick Jacobson
- Daybreakers by Michael Spierig and Peter Spierig
- Survival of the Dead by George A. Romero
- Jennifer's Body by Karyn Kusama
- The Loved Ones by Sean Byrne
- Ong Bak 2 by Tony Jaa and Panna Rittikrai
- [REC 2] by Jaume Balagueró and Paco Plaza
- Solomon Kane by Michael J. Bassett
- Symbol by Hitoshi Matsumoto
- A Town Called Panic by Stéphane Aubier and Vincent Patar

=== Reel to Reel ===
- The Art of the Steal by Don Argott
- Bassidji by Mehran Tamadon
- Cleanflix by Andrew James and Joshua Ligairi
- Collapse by Chris Smith
- Colony by Carter Gunn and Ross McDonnell
- Genius Within: The Inner Life of Glenn Gould by Peter Raymont and Michèle Hozer
- Google Baby by Zippi Brand Frank
- How to Fold a Flag by Michael Tucker and Petra Epperlein
- L' Enfer de Henri-Georges Clouzot by Serge Bromberg and Ruxandra Medrea
- The Most Dangerous Man in America: Daniel Ellsberg and the Pentagon Papers by Judith Ehrlich and Rick Goldsmith
- Petropolis: Aerial Perspectives on the Alberta Tar Sands by Peter Mettler
- Presumed Guilty by Roberto Hernández and Geoffrey Smith
- Reel Injun by Neil Diamond
- Schmatta: Rags to Riches to Rags by Marc Levin
- Snowblind by Vikram Jayanti
- Stolen by Violeta Ayala and Dan Fallshaw
- The Topp Twins by Leanne Pooley
- Videocracy by Erik Gandini

=== Vanguard ===
- Accident by Soi Cheang
- The Ape by Jesper Ganslandt
- Bunny and the Bull by Paul King
- Carcasses by Denis Côté
- The Dirty Saints by Luis Ortega
- Enter the Void by Gaspar Noé
- Fish Tank by Andrea Arnold
- Hipsters by Valery Todorovsky
- The Misfortunates by Felix Van Groeningen
- Leslie, My Name Is Evil by Reginald Harkema
- My Queen Karo by Dorothée van den Berghe
- Spring Fever by Lou Ye
- The White Stripes Under Great White Northern Lights by Emmett Malloy

=== Visions ===
- Between Two Worlds by Vimukthi Jayasundara
- Face by Tsai Ming-liang
- Gaia by Jason Lehel
- Hiroshima by Pablo Stoll
- Independencia by Raya Martin
- I Am Love by Luca Guadagnino
- Irene by Alain Cavalier
- Karaoke by Chris Chong Chan Fui
- Lebanon by Samuel Maoz
- Nymph by Pen-Ek Ratanaruang
- To Die Like a Man by João Pedro Rodrigues
- To the Sea by Pedro González-Rubio
- Trash Humpers by Harmony Korine

=== Short Cuts ===
- 5 Dysfunctional People in a Car, Pat Mills
- 75 El Camino, Sami Khan
- The Armoire, Jamie Travis
- Big Head, Dylan Akio Smith
- La Chute, Ivan Grbovic
- Covered, John Greyson
- Danse Macabre, Pedro Pires
- De Mouvement, Richard Kerr
- Deadman, Chelsea McMullan
- Edge of the Desert, Lea Nakonechny
- Fish in Barrel, Randall Okita
- Found, Paramita Nath
- A Hindu's Indictment of Heaven, Dev Khanna
- Homeland Security, Isaac Cravit
- IKW, Caroline Monnet
- Interview with the Earth, Nicolás Pereda
- The Island, Trevor Anderson
- Léger problème, Hélène Florent
- Life Begins (La vie commence), Émile Proulx-Cloutier
- M, Félix Dufour-Laperrière
- Man v. Minivan, Spencer Maybee
- My Toxic Baby, Min Sook Lee
- Naissances, Anne Émond
- Night Mayor, Guy Maddin
- On a Lonely Drive, Igor Drljaca
- Out in That Deep Blue Sea, Kazik Radwanski
- Pointless Film, Peter Wellington
- Record, Dylan Reibling
- Runaway, Cordell Barker
- Sixty Seconds of Regret, Ed Gass-Donnelly
- Smoke, Nikos Theodosakis and Linda Theodosakis
- Snow Hides the Shade of Fig Trees, Samer Najari
- Soap, Dusty Mancinelli
- The Spine, Chris Landreth
- Swimming Lesson, Caitriona Cantillon
- The Translator, Sonya Di Rienzo
- Tungijuq, Félix Lajeunesse and Paul Raphaël
- Unlocked, Mio Adilman
- Vive la rose, Bruce Alcock
- Volta, Ryan Mullins
- Vs., Ben Bruhmuller

== Canada's Top Ten ==
TIFF's annual Canada's Top Ten list, its national critics and festival programmers poll of the ten best feature and short films of the year, was released in December 2009.

=== Feature films ===
- Cairo Time — Ruba Nadda
- Carcasses — Denis Côté
- Crackie — Sherry White
- Defendor — Peter Stebbings
- I Killed My Mother (J'ai tué ma mère) — Xavier Dolan
- The Legacy (La Donation) — Bernard Émond
- Passenger Side — Matt Bissonnette
- Polytechnique — Denis Villeneuve
- The Trotsky — Jacob Tierney
- The Wild Hunt — Alexandre Franchi

=== Short films ===
- The Armoire — Jamie Travis
- The Cave — Helen Haig-Brown
- Danse Macabre — Pedro Pires
- Five Hole: Tales of Hockey Erotica — Cam Christiansen
- Life Begins (La Vie commence) — Émile Proulx-Cloutier
- Naissances — Anne Émond
- Out in That Deep Blue Sea — Kazik Radwanski
- Runaway — Cordell Barker
- The Spine — Chris Landreth
- Vive la rose — Bruce Alcock
