= Re-edited film =

Film modified after initial release

A re-edited film is a motion picture that has been modified from the manner in which it was showcased in its original theatrical release. Reasons for this type of editing may range from the distributor's demands to accommodating different audience groups. Fan-made movie edits are often met with controversy, as they bring up issues of copyright law.

== Types of re-editing ==
There are three main types of film editing: format, length, and content.

- Format – Feature films are commonly produced in a widescreen 1.85:1 aspect ratio or 2.40:1 aspect ratio. which is different from the screen formats currently utilized for television transmissions—a standard 1.33:1 (or 4:3) aspect ratio for analog or standard-definition television broadcasts and the growing standard of 1.77:1 (or 16:9) aspect ratio for digital television broadcasts. Prior to the beginning of a film presented in the 4:3 aspect ratio on VHS tapes or DVDs, a disclaimer appears (mainly over a black background), reading, This film has been modified from its original version. It has been formatted to fit this screen. Since the adoption of the high-definition television resolution standard, some theatrical films intended for 2.39:1 or 2.40:1 aspect ratios have been reframed for 1.78:1 (16:9) for television and home video, and also require the modification warning as per Directors Guild of America (DGA) rules.
- Length – Films may be shortened for television broadcasts (principally on advertiser-supported networks and terrestrial stations to accommodate commercial advertising) or for use on airlines. On the other hand, DVD releases of films may contain longer edits than even the original release. In recent years, a growing number of feature films are being released in an Unrated cut, incorporating scenes that may have been excluded from the film's original theatrical prints. If a film has scenes edited to fit its designated timeslot, prior to the beginning of a re-edited film's television airing, an additional notice indicating that the film has been edited "to run in the time allotted" will be included in the format disclaimer screen. An increasingly common practice for length-edited films shown on advertiser-supported television networks is for the film's end credits to sometimes be sped up to accommodate succeeding programs, or to free up more airtime for advertisements.
- Content – Some films have content deemed "objectionable" to "family audiences", usually on account of sexual content (including nudity and depictions of sexual activity), obscene language and graphic violence, illicit drug use and perceived racial insensitivity. To make these films suitable for younger or more typical audiences, or to appeal to advertisers when a film is shown on ad-supported broadcast television or basic cable services, alternative versions are created with such content removed or replaced. Often, profanities are substituted with minced oaths through automated dialogue replacement (ADR) or are muted entirely. The editing of these versions is performed by a censor and not the producer or director of the work. In addition, a film is often edited if it originally received an NC-17 (No one 17 or under admitted) rating from the Motion Picture Association (MPA, formerly the Motion Picture Association of America or MPAA), as NC-17 rated films are not screened at mainstream cinemas or advertised on television. Therefore, studios will often re-edit the film to achieve an R rating instead.

== Re-editing techniques ==
There are two main techniques for re-editing films:

=== Manual re-editing ===
Purchased film content is downloaded onto an editing work station's hard drive and is then manually re-edited by third-party editors to remove objectionable content from the video and audio tracks. The re-edited version is then copied onto media (VHS or DVD) and made available for rental or purchase, provided an original version has been purchased in correlation with the re-edited copy. Some manual re-edits are done by fans (see The Phantom Edit) to cut a film to their own specifications, or that of their peers.

Although a 2006 lower court ruling prohibits businesses from manually re-editing commercial films, the law still allows for individuals to self-censor and edit their own films for personal use.

=== Programmed re-editing ===
Programmed re-editing occurs when software (such as that employed in a DVD player) is used to skip portions of the video and/or audio content.

== Opening notices ==
Major American producers and distributors began adding notices such as "This film has been modified from its original version. It has been formatted to fit this screen" in 1993. The voluntary labelling program was established by the MPAA in response to pending legislation in Congress that would have mandated more specific notices.

== History of manual re-editing ==
Early cases of this practice date back to Germany under the Nazis, who regularly stole prints of American movies from other European countries. They would then either cheaply reanimate the movie, or change the names of production staff listed in the credits (as with Max and David Fleischer's cartoon shorts).

As theatrical movies began to air on television, networks successfully sought permission to air shortened versions of movies. The television edits of theatrical films had sections or the entirety of scenes cut out, in order to provide a print length that could fit within a fixed number of multiple half-hour time slots (often four half-hour slots). This also allowed scenes unsuitable for television broadcast (such as those including depictions of sexual activity or graphic violence) to be cut or trimmed. On the other hand, networks would also often add footage deleted from a film's theatrical release to pad out a certain running time (usually three to four hours in length).

In response to consumer demand, families began to re-edit purchased VHS tapes manually by making cuts and splices to the tape. A hotbed for this activity has been the historically conservative state of Utah. When Titanic was released on VHS in the winter of 1998, a video store owner in Utah began offering to re-edit purchased copies of the film for a $5 service fee. The service became very popular, and before long, several video rental businesses purchased VHS tapes and then re-edited for their rental club/co-op members.

At the end of the 1990s, some small companies began selling copies of movies without scenes containing violent and/or indecent content, or foul language, to appeal to family audiences. By 2003, the major American film studios and individual filmmakers reacted against these unauthorized modifications, considering them to be a destruction of the filmmakers' work, and a violation of the controls that an author has over their work.

When DVD technology emerged, the re-editing industry began offering a disabled DVD accompanied by a re-edited version of the film on a coupled DVD-R for sale or rental. Several companies attempted this business, with some trying to do this through physical brick and mortar stores. The most successful of these proprietors of re-edited film content was Utah-based CleanFlicks, Inc., which utilized a unique distribution model to distribute its inventory. Clean Films later became the largest and most successful company by employing an online rental model (similar to Netflix) and avoiding employing any physical stores. After a CleanFlicks franchisee in Colorado pre-emptively sued several major film directors out of concern that the guild (citing a notice on the DGA's website that inferred such a lawsuit was pending) were going to sue, the Directors Guild of America and the MPAA filed a countersuit against CleanFlicks and CleanFilms—while including several other distributors of edited DVD prints of theatrical features—arguing that the re-editing and distribution of their original work amounted to a violation of copyright.

In 2005, Mel Gibson released a cut version of The Passion of the Christ to theaters (and later on home media), with scenes containing graphic violence toned down. In 2006, Judge Richard P. Matsch of the United States District Court for the District of Colorado ruled that CleanFilms, CleanFlicks and other edited film distributors's distribution of re-edited films without consent from the film studios amounted to copyright infringement. The key was the fixed media aspect of the businesses; at all times, for instance, CleanFilms sold edited films as seemingly-legitimate products. Furthermore, every edited DVD rental unit sold direct-to-customer had a corresponding original copy that was purchased at retail. ClearPlay was not affected by this ruling, as they did not sell fixed media, and editing took place as the unaltered streamed media was altered by the consumer's control of ClearPlay's software.

Despite Judge Matsch's decision and his order that the re-editing companies to destroy all their re-edited inventory, shortly after the studios' victory in the Denver court, the lawyers for the studios negotiated with lawyers for the re-editing companies allowing for the sale of existing inventory. In an unexpected investor outcome given the loss of a major infringement case, one of the companies in the first three days of an apparent liquidation sale generated more than a quarter of a million dollars in revenue and eventually sold sufficient re-edited movies to provide their original investors a return on investment worth five times or more the ROI.

Less controversial than external bodies editing movies was the rise of director's cut editions of movies, which flourished with the advent of DVDs. These restore—and occasionally also shorten or omit (as in the case of Alien)—scenes or footage from films that were respectively left out of, or included in the theatrical print for varying reasons (including studio interference with the directors' creative vision, inability to finish what was intended due to technology, or even the reactions of test audiences).

== History of programmed re-editing ==
ClearPlay was sued by the DGA and MPAA, but the case was rendered moot by the Family Entertainment and Copyright Act of 2005, which clarified that ClearPlay's filtering approach was legal and did not violate copyright law. As a result, ClearPlay has been able to offer its products to consumers in the United States, while others have discontinued distribution of edited home video releases for legal reasons.

Another aspect of re-editing comes with consumer-made edits; the practice of fan edits, which have become more popular as they have spread over the internet, involves consumers loading filmed content onto their computers and using video-editing software, mostly to produce a version with content changed altered to their own preferences.

== Future of the industry ==
It is unclear where this industry is headed. An April 2005 poll conducted by ABC News indicated continued demand for the product. Of 1,002 adults from across the United States sampled for the poll, 39% of those polled expressed interest in purchasing re-edited films, while 58% of respondents said that they would not be interested in making such a purchase (with a three-point error margin).

Despite the aforementioned legal rulings, companies continue to sell re-edited movies via the Internet, some of which have been shut down in accordance with the reasoning of the 2006 decision by the Colorado District Court. Even still, online search engine results reveal that companies continue to provide fixed media products, such as Clean Play DVDs. Sometimes, these re-sellers use "going out of business" tactics to move inventory. However, physical "brick and mortar" stores, such as Cougar Video in Provo, Utah, have been closing down. This last remained open long after the companies named in the lawsuit detailed above were closed down.

One company, Swank, offers re-edited movies created by the studios themselves, supposedly for showings in correctional facilities and other non-theatrical locations. It is not clear whether these versions are the same re-edited versions that studios create for airlines or television showings.

== See also ==
- V-chip
- Hays Code
- Motion picture rating system, MPAA film rating system
- Television content rating system
- Standards & Practices
- Censorship
- Radio edit
- Film editing, the techniques used
- Turner Broadcasting System
- Edit Decision List
