= Clean Films =

American media company

Clean Films was a Latter-day Saint company in the United States founded by Chad Fullmer that edited the content of DVDs to remove profanity, nudity, violence, crude language, and other unwanted content. They purchased original copies of DVDs for every edited one they produced. They created an online "co-operative rental club" so that others could joint-own the original copies of the DVDs the co-operative purchased.

== Lawsuit ==
Editing videos in this way was controversial. CleanFilms (aka CleanFilms.com) was named in a lawsuit along with two other companies CleanFlicks and Play It Clean Video. In July 2006, U.S. District Judge Richard P. Matsch ruled in favor of the directors and the studios. In his decision the judge stated: Their objective ... is to stop the infringement because of its irreparable injury to the creative artistic expression in the copyrighted movies. There is a public interest in providing such protection. Due to the court ruling CleanFilms is no longer in operation.

== See also ==
- ClearPlay, a similar service
- Re-edited film
- VidAngel, a similar service
