= VidAngel =

Video streaming service

- Type: Public
- Industry: Entertainment
- Founded: 2013; 13 years ago
- Successor: Angel Studios
- Headquarters: Lehi, Utah, United States
- Area served: United States
- Key people: Jeremy Lewis (CEO)
- Services: Custom filtering of streaming media
- Website: vidangel.com

VidAngel is an American streaming video company that allows the user to skip objectionable content based on user preferences regarding profanity, nudity, sexual situations, and graphic violence. The company uses customizable filters to automatically cut out scenes or sounds which the viewer does not want to see or hear. The company was launched in 2013 by the Harmon Brothers in Utah. The company used equity crowdfunding to fund its growth, raising $10 million from customer-investors.

In 2016, it was sued by several major Hollywood studios who said the original method it used to filter objectionable content from movies, which involved decrypting DVDs and Blu-rays, violated copyright protections. VidAngel fought the lawsuit for several years, asserting its method was legal under the Family Movie Act. It developed a new model based on streaming whereby it filters a video stream from Netflix and Amazon. The company filed for Chapter 11 bankruptcy in 2017 as a legal strategy to protect the company against the lawsuit and allow it to reorganize its business around the streaming service. It continued to operate during the bankruptcy process. In 2020, VidAngel reached a settlement with the four studios, agreeing to pay $9.9 million to the studios, and emerged from bankruptcy. The settlement prohibits VidAngel from streaming content from the four studios which sued it, but it can stream content from other studios. In 2022, VidAngel relaunched under new ownership.

Its current model is based entirely on streaming, filtering movies and TV shows from Netflix, Amazon Prime Video, Apple TV+, Paramount+, and Peacock. It also filters titles from other services which are available through Amazon, including Showtime, Starz, Paramount+, AMC+, BritBox, and PBS Masterpiece.

== History ==
=== Founding ===
VidAngel was founded in 2013 and launched in 2014 by the Harmon brothers in Provo, Utah as a startup company with six employees. In March 2014, the company said it had moved its headquarters to California's Silicon Valley. The brothers had previously founded Harmon Brothers, an ad agency. According to Neal Harmon, the brothers were fed up with explicit material and wanted to be able to show movies to their kids.

In December 2016, VidAngel began a Regulation A+ securities offering (mini initial public offering) to get $5 million in investments. It met its goal after 28 hours and had over $10 million after five days. They assigned 42% of the $10 million to advertising and 26% to legal costs associated with the studio lawsuit. Harmon Brothers, owned by VidAngel founders and officers Neal Harmon and Jeffery Harmon, will make the advertisements.

=== Disc-based model ===
Under its original model, VidAngel purchased thousands of DVDs and Blu-rays of films. Customers could select a film to buy from VidAngel for $20. VidAngel would reserve a disc of that film for the customer. VidAngel would then stream a master copy of the film to the customer based on their unique customized filters. After viewing the film, the customer could choose to sell its "copy" back to VidAngel for $19, making the net cost $1 for 24 hours.

VidAngel cited the Family Movie Act of 2005 (FMA) as legally protecting customers' right to use their service to filter films. VidAngel's public statements included the claim that FMA protects filtered streaming as long as the movie is an authorized copy watched in the privacy of the home, and no permanent filtered copy is created.

According to VidAngel, after launching DVD and Blu-ray based sales, the company made three other attempts to sell filtering to consumers, including a partnership with Google to add filters to licensed films available on Google Play, filtering movies purchased on YouTube, and buying discs directly from the studios, but the studios rejected all proposals. Studios claimed that VidAngel then bought licensed discs from retail stores, made copies, and employed a method of "streaming from its own 'master' copies of works that VidAngel has created on its own servers rather than layering its filters over an authorized stream".

=== Lawsuit ===
In 2016, four major Hollywood studios – Lucasfilm, 20th Century Fox, Disney Enterprises, Inc., and Warner Bros. – filed a federal lawsuit against VidAngel for circumventing copyright protection on DVDs and for unlicensed video streaming, accusing them of violating the DMCA. The court granted Disney's motion for a preliminary injunction, declaring that VidAngel had violated copyright laws by circumventing copyright protection technology on DVDs and by hosting the streamed content on VidAngel's computer servers without appropriate licensing and permission from copyright holders. The court also rejected VidAngel's Fair Use defense.

The judge ordered VidAngel to stop streaming movies. VidAngel requested a stay, which was denied. The injunction was upheld upon appeal.

=== Streaming model ===
In June 2017, shortly after the Ninth Circuit Court of Appeals denied their request to lift the injunction, VidAngel announced a new streaming service for $9.99 per month to filter content streamed through Netflix, Amazon Prime Video, and HBO. Only titles from studios not included in the lawsuit were available. In a June 2017 statement, Netflix noted: "We have not endorsed or approved the VidAngel technology". VidAngel customers are required to have a separate Netflix or Amazon subscription in addition to a VidAngel subscription

In October 2017, VidAngel filed for Chapter 11 bankruptcy protection as a legal strategy to protect the company against the ongoing lawsuit and allow it to reorganize its business around its new streaming service. The filing forced a pause on the lawsuit, but allowed business to continue as usual. A statement on the company's blog announced: "VidAngel is not going away", that the company has "millions of dollars in the bank, and now generating millions in revenue," and stated its goal was "to reorganize the business around our new streaming model" to stay in business and pay damages when they finally lose the pending trial. Some customers whose buy-back credits for DVD purchases were included in the bankruptcy among VidAngel's assets were prevented from cashing out these refunds while the bankruptcy was pending. However, Vidangel allowed those buy-back credits to be used for its new streaming service.

In 2019, a Los Angeles jury ordered VidAngel to pay over $62 million in damages to the studios. The amount was reduced to $9.9 million in a settlement in 2020, and VidAngel emerged from bankruptcy. As part of the settlement with the studios, VidAngel agreed not to stream or filter content from the four studios which sued it.

=== Relaunch ===
VidAngel emerged from bankruptcy in 2020 and has continued to use the streaming model to filter content through Netflix, Amazon Prime, and later, Apple TV+. In 2021, VidAngel was split into two companies: the filtering business, now legally called VidAngel Entertainment, and Angel Studios, a crowdfunded content platform producing family-friendly and faith-based entertainment. Bill Aho, who had previously been CEO of ClearPlay, became VidAngel's new CEO. Aho kept the company's employees on board and invested more resources in the platform's technology and customer service. Aho stated that the company's legal troubles are in the past and noted that most Hollywood studios chose not to participate in the lawsuit.

In 2022, VidAngel relaunched with a new ad campaign developed by Harmon Brothers. VidAngel's subscriber base doubled in the first year under Aho's ownership.

== See also ==
- Fair use
- Family Movie Act of 2005
- Sherman Antitrust Act
- DMCA
- Copyright Law
- CleanFlicks, an earlier Utah based company with a similar business model
- ClearPlay
