= Bill Aho =

American businessman (born 1957)

- Born: 1957 (age 68–69)
- Education: University of Minnesota Duluth (B.A.); Brigham Young University (M.B.A.)
- Occupation: Partner at The SagePoint Group
- Spouse: Rebecca

Bill Aho is an American businessman who is a partner with The SagePoint Group, a management consulting firm.

== Early life and education ==
He received his B.A. from the University of Minnesota Duluth and an MBA from the Brigham Young University Marriott School of Management in 1983.

== Career ==
Aho began his career in brand management at Procter & Gamble. He later spent nine years with PepsiCo. He was Senior Vice President of Strategic Planning for Darden Restaurants and was instrumental in turning around the Red Lobster business. He has been featured in many publications, including The Wall Street Journal and Forbes, and appeared on many TV and radio broadcasts, including MSNBC, Entertainment Tonight, PBS, ABC News, NPR, etc. In 2006 and 2007 he was named to the V100 as one of Utah's top entrepreneurs.

From 2001 to 2007, he was CEO of the movie-filtering company ClearPlay. In 2021, he became CEO of VidAngel, another movie filtering company.

In 2025, Aho was recognized as CEO of the Year by Utah Business Magazine for his leadership at VidAngel.
