= Fan edit =

Version of a film modified by a viewer

A fan edit is any type of media that has been modified by a viewer, that removes, reorders, or adds material in order to create a new interpretation of the source material. This includes the removal of scenes or dialogue, replacement of audio and/or visual elements, and adding material from sources such as movies, YouTube videos, or interviews. Another type of fan edit are transition edits, where the editor takes pictures of a celebrity and creates smooth transitions between the picture. This can be both 2D and 3D, depending on the style.

== Definition ==
In their most common form, fan edits resemble the work done by professional editors when creating a director's or extended cut of a film, although fan edits are usually limited by the footage already made available to the public with the official home video release of a film, while professional editors working for a film studio have access to more and higher quality footage and elements. In addition to re-editing films, some fan edits feature basic corrections, such as colors or framing, that maintain or restore consistency within the film, such as the Star Wars fan-restoration Harmy's Despecialized Edition, which aims at restoring the Star Wars Original Trilogy to its original, pre-Special Edition form. Other types of fan edits, such as Cosmogony, Bateman Begins: An American Psycho and Memories Alone, merge footage from various films into an entirely different production. While many fan edits are viewed as reactionary to perceived weaknesses in the original films, one film scholar at the University of Kansas has argued that such edits allow fans to creatively reimagine films instead of merely attempting to fix such works.

== History ==
Before the term "fan edit" was coined, many alternate versions of films edited by other fans or professional editors were simply known as a "cut". In the late 1970s, many alternate "cuts" of films were released in the United States, and foreign films (such as those from Europe or Japan) deemed unsuitable for American audiences underwent further alterations, score changes and re-titlings.

The first fan edit to popularize the field was The Phantom Edit, created in 2000 by professional editor Mike J. Nichols under the pseudonym of the "Phantom Editor". Nichols removed elements from George Lucas' Star Wars: Episode I – The Phantom Menace that he felt detracted from the film, and made minor changes in dialogue, languages and subtitles to give the film's villains a more menacing tone. The result was distributed on VHS and later online, and received attention by the media for its attempt to improve upon the original film. The Phantom Edit was the first of many Star Wars fan edits to come, and has since inspired dozens of edits to surface on the internet.

The second major edit was done with A.I. Artificial Intelligence, originally a film that Stanley Kubrick was involved with, that Steven Spielberg ended up directing after Kubrick's death. In 2002, an independent filmmaker named DJ Hupp introduced his take on the film named "The Kubrick Edit", omitting certain scenes to alter the tone, to be closer to Kubrick's style.

The following year, the Purist Edit changed The Lord of the Rings: The Two Towers to more closely follow J. R. R. Tolkien's books.

After that the trend started to gain popularity and spread to other films in the same fashion, such as The Matrix series, Pearl Harbor, Dune, Superman II, and others. Editor Adywan (Adrian Sayce) made a complete overhaul of Star Wars and The Empire Strikes Back in 2009 and 2017 respectively, under the title Star Wars – Revisited, featuring continuity fixes, image and cropping corrections, score restoration, new matter, rotoscoping work and new CGI elements to remove several additions from the various Special Editions of the films from 1997 onward. In 2008, a similar overhaul was made by editor Uncanny Antman (Sean O'Sullivan) to Terminator 3: Rise of the Machines, which changed the film's tone to be more in line with the first two films and fixed various continuity contradictions to the previous films and image & cropping errors; the film was rereleased under the title of Terminator: The Coming Storm.

Professional filmmaker Steven Soderbergh has created fan edits of Psycho and its remake, Raiders of the Lost Ark, Heaven's Gate and 2001: A Space Odyssey that he has posted on his website.

Independent filmmaker Peet Gelderblom made a fan edit of Brian De Palma's Raising Cain, which attempted to reorder the film the way it was originally scripted. De Palma came across the fan edit and was so impressed with it, he had Gelderblom supervise a high definition version of it for Blu-ray, which was released under the Director's Cut label, as De Palma felt that the edit has "restored the true story of Raising Cain".

Members of Fanedit.org have condensed seasons of Game of Thrones into feature-length films.

CleanFlicks was a Utah-based video store that offered more than 700 films that had been remixed to appeal to Utah's religious family audience. The chain of stores spread across 18 states in 70 different locations before a federal court judge ruled their remixes illegal in 2006.

In 2006, a filmmaker, artist, and fan of Richard Williams named Garrett Gilchrist created a non-profit fan restoration of the animated film The Thief and the Cobbler called The Recobbled Cut. It was done in as high quality as possible by combining available sources at the time, such as a heavily compressed file of Williams's workprint and better-quality footage from the Japanese DVD of Arabian Knight. This edit was much supported by numerous people who had worked on the film (with the exception of Richard Williams himself), including Roy Naisbitt, Alex Williams, Andreas Wessel-Therhorn, Tony White, Holger Leihe, Simon Maddocks, Neil Boyle, and Steve Evangelatos, many of whom lent rare material for the project. Some minor changes were made to "make it feel more like a finished film", like adding more music and replacing some bits of audio and storyboards with those from the Princess and the Cobbler version of the film. Certain scenes, like the wedding ending, had to be redrawn frame by frame by Gilchrist due to flaws in the footage. Gilchrist described this as the most complex independent restoration of a film ever undertaken. This edit gained positive reviews on the Internet. Twitch Film called it "the best and most important 'fan edit' ever made". It has been revised three times in 2006, 2008, and 2013. Each version incorporated further higher-quality materials donated by animators from the film, including two rare workprints from the Fred Calvert production that contained footage not available in the released versions. The "Mark 3" version released in 2008 incorporated 21 minutes from a 49-minute reel of rare 35 mm film. Gilchrist's latest version, "Mark 4", was released in September 2013 and edited in HD. "Mark 4" features about 30 minutes of the film in full HD quality, restored from raw 35 mm footage which Gilchrist edited frame by frame. Artists were also commissioned to contribute new artwork and material. Gilchrist's YouTube account, "TheThiefArchive", now serves as an unofficial video archive of Richard Williams's films, titles, commercials, and interviews, including footage from the Nasrudin production. Williams said that while he never saw Gilchrist's Recobbled Cut, he acknowledged the role that the fan edits had played in rehabilitating the film's reputation.

In 2017, French editors Lucas Stoll and Gaylor Morestin created a fan edit of Breaking Bad, condensing the entire series into a two-hour feature film and uploaded it onto Vimeo. They had worked on the film for around two years prior to its release. Soon afterward, the film was taken down for copyright violation.

In 2022, filmmaker Kai Patterson released Obi-Wan Kenobi: The Patterson Cut, in which the six episodes of the Disney+ Star Wars series, Obi-Wan Kenobi, was cut into a two and a half hour film.

Q2's version of Twin Peaks: Fire Walk with Me combines the original 1992 prequel and the 2014 compilation of deleted scenes edited by David Lynch himself.

== Contemporary fan editing ==
With the growth of social media and short-form video platforms, fan editing expanded beyond re-editing films and restoring existing footage into shorter forms of fan-created video. YouTube, Vine, Instagram, and later TikTok provided increasingly accessible ways for editors to distribute their work, while the differing formats of these platforms influenced the length, pacing, and visual techniques used in fan edits.

Multi-editor projects (MEPs) became a longstanding form of collaboration within online fan-video communities. In an MEP, multiple editors each create a segment of a longer video, commonly by dividing a song into sections and assigning individual portions to different participants before combining them into a single work. The format became widespread through platforms such as YouTube, where editors organized collaborative projects and recruited participants through open calls and auditions. MEPs predated the rise of TikTok, with the format documented in online fan-video communities by the early 2010s.

The development of short-form fan editing was accompanied by increasingly elaborate transition- and effects-based styles. Editors shared techniques, tutorials, resources, and project files through online communities, while individual editing styles were frequently adapted and recreated by other editors. Lauren Eusebio, known online as emowhofromwhoville, became a prominent figure in this community through fan edits, tutorials, and discussions of editing culture.

Collaborative MEPs and other editing projects have brought together editors from different areas of the fan-editing community, including creators associated with Lauren Eusebio’s work. Lauren has collaborated with editors such as Banqnas and Chris, known online as potterhead.asap, across various editing projects and creative collaborations. Chris has also worked beyond fan editing, including motion-design work associated with Emmy Award-winning motion-graphics artist Emonee LaRussa.

More recently, Lauren and Vee (katswiinks), also known as Yusif Rzayev, collaborated on an edit created for Cosmopolitan’s exclusive JENNIE covers. Their work was featured by Cosmopolitan in its August 10, 2026 article *“Meet the Fans Turning Pop Culture Obsessions Into Real Art,”* which highlighted eight fan artists and editors creating original work inspired by the magazine’s latest issue and JENNIE covers. Cosmopolitan specifically featured both Lauren Eusebio and Vee (Yusif Rzayev), with Lauren discussing the creative process behind their JENNIE edit and Vee describing their shared approach as a combination of 2000s pop culture, fashion, colorful visuals, and graphic design.

The collaboration represents a notable crossover between online fan editing and professional editorial media, with two fan editors contributing directly to a project connected to an established international publication such as Cosmopolitan.

Short-form fan edits increasingly reached audiences beyond dedicated fan-editing communities. In 2025, a fan edit of the film Creed by TikTok creator Areq received more than 200 million views and 19 million likes. Creed subsequently experienced a reported 29 percent increase in viewership, illustrating how a fan edit could generate renewed attention for an existing film.

Fan editing also became increasingly connected with professional media promotion. Entertainment companies and marketing agencies began incorporating fan-style editing into social-media campaigns, with some employing editors who had developed their audiences and editing styles within online fan communities. In 2025, Respective's campaign for Lollapalooza included 25 creatives and editors and explicitly involved hiring fan editors. The campaign produced more than 800 pieces of social content and generated 362 million views, 27 million likes, and 880,000 shares across TikTok and Instagram Reels.

The use of fan-style editing in entertainment marketing has also been documented in film promotion. Industry coverage has described studios such as Lionsgate incorporating edits created by editors recruited from TikTok into their social-media strategies, reflecting a growing overlap between fan-created video culture and professional promotional content.

== Fair use issues ==
While fan edits skirt the lines of fair use, the fan editing community largely emphasizes the use of the final product should only be for those who own the source material (commercial home video releases such as DVD), and are not to be distributed for profit or other personal gain. Lucasfilm is aware of the existence of Star Wars fan edits, and has stated they will take action when they believe copyright infringement has taken place.

In July 2007, Lucasfilm took action against fan editor "daveytod" after taking issue with his fan edit documentary of Star Wars: Episode II – Attack of the Clones, named The Clones Revealed. Their email to him cited the possibility of "consumer confusion," that The Clones Revealed might be mistaken for an official Lucasfilm product. The email was sent to several active members of the fan editing community and resulted in the short downtime of Fanedit.org. The reasoning given by Lucasfilm's anti-piracy team during communications with Fanedit.org moderators seemed to display the mistaken impression that The Clones Revealed was a bootleg of the film.

In November 2008, Fanedit.org was closed in its official capacity after receiving a complaint from the Motion Picture Association of America regarding the use of links to pirated content on the site in violation of copyright law.
