= Obi-Wan Kenobi: The Patterson Cut =

- Poster for version 2.1 of the edit
- Based on: Obi-Wan Kenobi by Deborah Chow
- Edited by: Kai Patterson
- Release date: 2022
- Running time: 150 minutes
- Language: English

Obi-Wan Kenobi: The Patterson Cut is a fan edit of the 2022 Star Wars miniseries Obi-Wan Kenobi, in which its six one-hour episodes are condensed into a two-and-a-half hour feature film.

Reactions to the edit have been positive overall from critics and audiences, with some mixed responses.

== Background ==
Logo of the Obi-Wan Kenobi TV series

The aim of filmmaker Kai Patterson, creator of the edit, was to address "fluff," fix "some of the ordering to some of the scenes just to make them more effective or impactful," "awkward pacing, whole scenes that ultimately amounted to nothing, goofy dialogue and directing choices," and Moses Ingram's character, Reva, to make her "more menacing."

Patterson explained that the edit is "my own artistic interpretation of how these scenes could be strung together to make something that works better for me personally." He has also stated that he was not trying to undermine the work of the original creators in creating the edit.

The show itself originally began development as a trilogy of films before transforming into a television series after the mixed reception and poor box office performance of 2018's Solo: A Star Wars Story. Because of this, Variety and Complex.com wrote that Patterson's edit "brings the project back to its origins." Screen Rant called it, "a glimpse at what could have been."

Despite the show receiving overall positive responses from critics and audiences, some fans took issue with the "filler," writing, pacing, a "weaker" middle half, questioning if it negated established Star Wars canon, and if development hell affected the final product.

== Production ==
In a TikTok video, Patterson presented the statement, "The Obi-Wan Kenobi series should've been a movie, and I have proof."

He cut most of the footage from episodes one, four and six, including a scene where Leia insults her cousin (but retaining the following scene where her father tells her to apologize), the widely panned scene in which Leia is chased by bounty hunters in a forest, and the subplot where Reva attacks the Lars' homestead.

Patterson restructured certain segments, such as moving the introduction of the character Nari to his encounter with Obi-Wan in the desert before the scene where the Inquisitors arrive on Tatooine.

Patterson also produced new shots, including one where a Stormtrooper asks Darth Vader for instructions, which was made with Blender using pieces of James Earl Jones' archive audio as Vader.

== Release ==
Patterson released the edit on his website, but it was removed from Google search results. Instead of instant access, viewers would need to have an account to view it. The purpose of this was to "do our best to keep this edit out of the hands of movie pirates."

=== Reception ===
Stephen M. Colbert of Screen Rant listed five ways how in his opinion the edit was better than the series, from the story putting a bigger emphasis on the title character, Reva having a "more impactful" arc, the new music, the redone pacing, and the changes to Darth Vader. Cooper Hood (also of Screen Rant) called the edit "fairly impressive." Raul Velasquez of GameRant said, "The [edit] gives [the series] a professional trim many Star Wars fans might have wanted from Disney in the first place." Cinemanía said (translated from Spanish), "the result is much better," and "Faced with such laudable work, any Jedi (or aspiring Jedi) would recognize that the Force is more powerful at hobbyist workbenches than it is in executive offices." Jonas Mäki of Gamereactor said, "It's well worth checking out…" YouTuber and critic John Campea described it as "fantastic," going on to say, "And by 'fantastic,' I mean the improvement over the show as it aired on Disney+. It doesn't make it the best Star Wars show I've ever seen, but the improvement is undeniable." Kate Harrold of GamingBible said, "[It] has its own issues, but it certainly provides for a compelling experience and is definitely worth checking out."

Michael Green of Digital Trends gave the edit a mixed review. He praised the edited content of episodes one, four and six, which he referred to as "the three weakest." He went on to praise the removal of Reva's attack upon the Lars' homestead, stating that it makes the battle between Obi-Wan and Darth Vader "more impactful," and the utilization of John Williams' music from previous Star Wars films, particularly "Duel of the Fates". However, Green criticized the first twenty-five minutes, calling it "truncated and choppy without sufficient setup and exposition." Green also called the reorganization of Nari's scenes "a very awkward transition," and the lack of omissions from episode four "probably Patterson's biggest mistake," also criticizing the transition from episode five to six.

Citing comments from news website The Adventures of Vesper and fans on Twitter, Paul Speed of Mirror.co.uk said, "many fans agree that this new fan-version has made [the show] a more enjoyable and cohesive story, though some noted there are certain edits that make it all feel a bit rushed."

=== Legality ===
Due to the nature of the edit being a derivative of a copyrighted work, Patterson is not profiting from the edit, and urges potential viewers to own a Disney+ subscription before viewing, stating, "Let's make sure we're supporting all the original artists on this show by not letting this become a means of pirating."

== See also ==
- The Phantom Edit, a fan edit of Star Wars: Episode I – The Phantom Menace
