= Disney v. VidAngel =

2016 copyright infringement case

Disney Enterprises v. VidAngel,
- Court: United States District Court for the Central District of California
- Full case name: Disney Enterprises, Inc. v. VidAngel, Inc.
- Decided: March 9, 2019

Court membership
- Judge sitting: André Birotte Jr.

Disney Enterprises, Inc. v. VidAngel, Inc. was a 2016 United States District Court for the Central District of California case in which four major Hollywood studios -- Disney, Lucasfilm, 20th Century Fox, and Warner Bros.—filed a copyright infringement complaint against VidAngel, a company which allows users to filter out objectionable content from movies and TV shows. The studios alleged that the method VidAngel used to filter and stream films to its users was illegal under copyright law because they broke the encryption on DVDs and Blu-rays. VidAngel contended that their method was legal under an exception provided by the Family Movie Act.

Judge André Birotte Jr. granted the studios' motion for preliminary injunction in December 2016, ordering VidAngel to stop streaming movies. VidAngel's appeal for an emergency stay of the injunction was denied by the Ninth Circuit Court of Appeals. The lawsuit forced VidAngel into Chapter 11 bankruptcy protection during which they reorganized their business under a streaming model.

In June 2019, a jury ordered VidAngel to pay $62 million in damages to the studios. In September 2020, VidAngel reached a settlement agreement with the studios which reduced the damages to $9.9 million and prohibits VidAngel from streaming content by the four studios. VidAngel is free to stream content from other studios.

== Background ==
VidAngel was founded in 2014 to allow users to select customizable filters to edit out objectionable content, such as graphic violence, nudity, and profanity from films and TV shows. VidAngel's original model was disc-based. VidAngel would buy a DVD or Blu-ray of a movie. The customer would buy the disc from VidAngel for $20. VidAngel would stream the film to the user, after which the user could sell it back to VidAngel for up to $19, making the net cost $1. During a legal deposition, Neal Harmon, one of the company's founders and then CEO, said that VidAngel decrypted and ripped DVDs using the software program AnyDVD HD.

VidAngel cited the Family Movie Act of 2005 (FMA) as legally protecting customers' right to use their service to filter films. VidAngel's public statements included the claim that FMA protects filtered streaming as long as the movie is an authorized copy watched in the privacy of the home, and no permanent filtered copy is created.

According to VidAngel, after launching DVD and Blu-ray based sales, the company made three other attempts to sell filtering to consumers, including a partnership with Google to add filters to licensed films available on Google Play, filtering movies purchased on YouTube, and buying discs directly from the studios, but the studios rejected all proposals. Studios claimed that VidAngel then bought licensed discs from retail stores, made copies, and employed a method of "streaming from its own 'master' copies of works that VidAngel has created on its own servers rather than layering its filters over an authorized stream".

== Lawsuit ==
On June 12, 2016, production companies such as Lucasfilm, 20th Century Fox, Disney Enterprises, Inc., and Warner Bros. filed a federal lawsuit against VidAngel for circumventing copyright protection on DVDs and for unlicensed video streaming, accusing them of violating the DMCA. VidAngel filed a counterclaim against the companies alleging violation of the Sherman Antitrust Act and the preliminary hearing was held on November 14, 2016.

VidAngel was represented by a group of lawyers led by Peter Stris of Stris & Maher, a small but influential firm known for handling complex cases and arguments at the Supreme Court. Disney was represented by a group of lawyers led by former Solicitor General Donald Verrilli.

Judge Andre Birotte Jr., in a ruling on December 12, 2016, granted Disney's motion for a preliminary injunction, declaring that VidAngel had violated copyright laws by circumventing copyright protection technology on DVDs and by hosting the streamed content on VidAngel's computer servers without appropriate licensing and permission from copyright holders. The court also rejected VidAngel's Fair Use defense, noting as paraphrased in media about the case, "VidAngel does not add anything and the result has essentially the same entertainment value as the original, thus the fair use defense is unlikely to win out."

Judge Birotte's order blocked VidAngel from circumventing copyright protection features on DVDs and also ordered them to stop streaming movies, stating that the Family Movie Act requires that the filtered content comes from an "authorized copy" of the film, and the digital content VidAngel streamed was not an authorized copy. Shortly thereafter, VidAngel requested a stay of the preliminary injunction, claiming the company would suffer irreparable legal harm from not being able to operate while the case makes its way through the courts. VidAngel vowed to fight the case all the way to the United States Supreme Court. VidAngel announced intentions to obey the court's order to stop streaming effective December 30, 2016. However, in January 2017, VidAngel was found in contempt of court for continuing to add titles in violation of the court's order. For this infraction, they were fined $10,231.20 in legal costs incurred by Disney et al. After this ruling, Johnathan Bailey of Plagiarism Today wrote that VidAngel's public statements have consistently misrepresented the core legal issues in the case by characterizing the major film studios as opposed primarily to filtering adult content: "[T]he studios have repeatedly made it clear that the filtering is not the issue, it's the unauthorized streaming and copy protection circumvention, nothing more."

VidAngel appealed the case to the Ninth Circuit Court of Appeals. A hearing occurred June 8, 2017, where VidAngel requested an emergency stay of the injunction. VidAngel's request was denied and the injunction was upheld.

VidAngel requested an appeal or clarification of the injunction, specifically whether a new streaming-based system they had developed, which filtered content streamed from Netflix and Amazon Prime, was a violation of the injunction. Disney et al. responded with a request for an ex parte ruling, arguing that VidAngel violated procedural rules by not notifying Disney of their intentions of filing such an appeal or clarification. On August 2, 2017, Judge Birotte rejected VidAngel's request for appeal or clarification of the injunction.

On August 24, 2017, the Ninth Circuit Court of Appeals upheld the injunction against VidAngel, quoting a statement from U.S. Senator Orrin Hatch that the Family Movie Act is not a defense for violation of copy protection measures or for violation of copyright law, and to suggest otherwise is "counter to legislative intent" of the Family Movie Act.

In September 2017, VidAngel filed its own lawsuit in a Utah federal court against affiliates of the studios, including Marvel Comics, Fox Broadcasting Company, Castle Rock Entertainment, MGM Studios, and others, seeking a declaratory judgment that its new streaming model is legal. After VidAngel reportedly decided to drop the case, U.S. District Court Judge David Nuffer dismissed this lawsuit on August 7, 2018.

In October 2017, VidAngel filed for Chapter 11 bankruptcy protection as a legal strategy to protect the company against the ongoing lawsuit and allow it to reorganize its business around its new streaming service in an effort to ensure that they could avoid the courts from declaring how much VidAngel owed the studios in copyright infringement fines for as long as possible. VidAngel estimated between $1 million and $10 million in liabilities, and approximately equal amounts of assets. The filing forces a pause on the lawsuit, but allows business to continue as usual. A statement on the company's blog announced: "VidAngel is not going away", that the company has "millions of dollars in the bank, and now generating millions in revenue," and stated its goal was "to reorganize the business around our new streaming model" to stay in business and pay damages when they finally lose the pending trial. The plaintiffs in the lawsuit characterized the bankruptcy as a delay tactic, noting that prior rulings indicate VidAngel would probably lose in court. An article in Utah's Deseret News further notes that the bankruptcy has provoked ire among some customers whose buy-back credits for DVD purchases are included in the bankruptcy among VidAngel's assets, preventing customers from cashing out these refunds while the bankruptcy is pending. However, Vidangel is allowing those buy-back credits to be used in its new streaming service.

== Resolution ==
Given that VidAngel stipulated to all the allegations made by Disney et al., Judge Birotte ruled there was no reason for a trial and proceeded to the penalty phase. In June 2019, a Los Angeles jury ordered VidAngel to pay over $62 million in damages, $75,000 for each of the 819 films that VidAngel streamed plus a $1 million fine for violating the Digital Millennium Copyright Act.

In early September 2020, VidAngel reached a settlement in the lawsuit to pay damages of $9.9 million rather than the original $62.4 million ordered by the court. VidAngel also agreed not to filter or stream content made by the four studios, but it remains free to do so for content from other studios.

In 2021, the company came under new ownership as the original owners moved their focus to original content under the company Angel Studios.
