= Life Begins =

Life Begins may refer to:

- Life Begins (TV series), a British TV series broadcast on ITV between February 2004 and October 2006
- Life Begins (1932 film), a film directed by James Flood and co-directed by Elliott Nugent
- Life Begins (2009 film), a Canadian short drama film
- A Life Begins, a 2010 Canadian French language drama film
