= The Saddest Boy in the World =

- Directed by: Jamie Travis
- Written by: Jamie Travis
- Produced by: Amy Belling; Jamie Travis
- Starring: Benjamin Smith; Kirsten Robek; Babz Chula
- Cinematography: Amy Belling
- Edited by: Jason Schneider
- Music by: Alfredo Santa Ana
- Production company: Modern Family Productions
- Release date: September 14, 2006 (TIFF)
- Running time: 13 minutes
- Country: Canada
- Language: English

The Saddest Boy in the World is a Canadian short black comedy film, directed by Jamie Travis and released in 2006. The film stars Benjamin Smith as Timothy Higgins, a lonely and unhappy young boy who plans to commit suicide by hanging himself on his birthday.

It was the second film in his Saddest Children in the World trilogy, following Why the Anderson Children Didn't Come to Dinner and preceding The Armoire.

The film had its theatrical premiere at the 2006 Toronto International Film Festival. It was later screened at the 2007 Inside Out Film and Video Festival, where it was cowinner with Michèle Pearson Clarke's Black Men and Me of the award for Best Canadian Short Film.
