= Elián (film) =

- Directed by: Tim Golden; Ross McDonnell
- Written by: Tim Golden
- Produced by: Trevor Birney
- Cinematography: Ross McDonnell
- Edited by: Michael J. Palmer; Hannah Vanderlan
- Music by: McKenzie Stubbert
- Production companies: Fine Point Films; Jigsaw Productions
- Distributed by: CNN Films (television); Gravitas Ventures (theater)
- Release date: 21 April 2017 (U.S.)
- Running time: 108 minutes
- Countries: Ireland; United States
- Languages: English; Spanish

Elián is a 2017 documentary film directed by Ross McDonnell and Tim Golden, produced by Irish documentary filmmaker Trevor Birney, and executive produced by Alex Gibney. The film details the story of young Cuban Elián González and features exclusive interviews with Elián and his family in Cuba and Miami, particularly Elián's father, Juan Miguel, and his cousin Marisleysis, who had cared for Elián while he was in Miami. The film was co-produced by Fine Point Films and Jigsaw Productions and features a voiceover by Raul Esparza.

== Synopsis ==
González's mother, Elizabeth Brotons Rodríguez, drowned in November 1999 while attempting to leave Cuba with González and her boyfriend to get to the United States. The U.S. Immigration and Naturalization Service (INS) initially placed González with paternal relatives in Miami, who sought to keep him in the United States against his father's demands that González be returned to Cuba.

A United States district court ruling that only González's father, and not his extended relatives, could petition for asylum on the boy's behalf was upheld by the 11th Circuit Court of Appeals. Elián's father Juan Miguel comes to the United States to claim his child, and Janet Reno orders a pre-dawn raid to take the boy from the home of his Miami relatives in Little Havana on April 22, 2000. Elián returns to Cuba with his father in June 2000.

Elián grows up in Cuba and forms a friendship with Fidel Castro.

== Release ==
The film premiered on April 21, 2017 at the Tribeca Film Festival. It opened in limited release in May, and was set to appear on CNN Films in August 2017.
