= Danse Macabre (2009 film) =

- Directed by: Pedro Pires
- Produced by: Pedro Pires; Catherine Chagnon
- Starring: Anne Bruce Falconer
- Cinematography: Pedro Pires
- Edited by: Pedro Pires
- Release date: April 4, 2009 (Lyon L'Étrange)
- Running time: 9 minutes
- Country: Canada

Danse Macabre is a Canadian short drama film, directed by Pedro Pires and released in 2009. The film portrays the "dance" of a dead body twitching and writhing as it is drained of fluids in preparation for its embalming.

The corpse was portrayed by dancer Anne Bruce Falconer.

The film won the award for Best Canadian Short Film at the 2009 Toronto International Film Festival, and was named to TIFF's year-end Canada's Top Ten list. It won the Genie Award for Best Live Action Short Drama at the 30th Genie Awards,
