= Cleanflix =

- Directed by: Andrew James; Joshua Ligairi
- Written by: Andrew James; Joshua Ligairi
- Produced by: Amber Bollinger; Andrew James; Joshua Ligairi
- Starring: Ray Lines; Allan Erb; Scott Nybo; Daniel Thompson; Robert Perry; David Knowlton; Philip Sherman Gordon; Neil LaBute; Richard Dutcher
- Cinematography: Andrew James; Joshua Ligairi
- Edited by: Andrew James; Joshua Ligairi
- Music by: Chris Ohran
- Production companies: Clean Cut Productions; Beachfire Pictures; Icarus Arts & Entertainment; Connell Creations
- Distributed by: Gravitas Ventures; Passion River Films; United Films
- Release dates: September 11, 2009 (TIFF 2009); 2012 (Limited theatrical release)
- Running time: 92 minutes
- Country: United States
- Language: English

Cleanflix is a documentary about CleanFlicks and the re-edited video stores and the film sanitization industry, particularly in Utah.

== Themes and discussion ==
The film mainly talks about CleanFlicks, the re-edited DVD business, how it was started, the Mormons moral beliefs on the editing of Hollywood movies, filmmakers' stances on the idea of re-edited films, and the lawsuits between CleanFlicks and the Directors Guild of America. It also shows some of the video stores in Utah Valley that sold them and the business owners and the sexual misconduct of edited video store owner, Daniel Thompson.

== Release ==
The film premiered at the 2009 Toronto International Film Festival. For about a year and a half, while the creators looked for a distribution company, it played at different film festivals. In 2012, they found their distributor who gave the film a limited theatrical release. Within that year, it was given a physical release on DVD and went onto streaming services such as Netflix (for three years), Amazon Prime Video, Vudu, YouTube, Hulu, and iTunes.

== Reception ==
The review aggregation website Rotten Tomatoes reported a 71% approval rating with an average rating of 6.25/10 based on 7 reviews.

Joe Leydon of Variety said, "Pic is undeniably amusing when focused on extreme measures by self-appointed censors, but there's only a token effort made to seriously examine central questions." Peter Sciretta of SlashFilm gave the film 7.5/10 stars, and called it, "the most interesting topical documentary about movies since This [Film] Is Not Yet Rated," but criticized the shift in focus on Danny Thompson during the film. Noel Murray of The A.V. Club gave the film a rating of B, praising the showcase of Daniel Thompson's story and criticizing the repetitiveness of the central subject. Cynthia Fuchs of PopMatters gave the film 7/10 stars, and stated, "[It] doesn't pretend to resolve the many questions it asks. Instead, [it] focuses on a particular, especially fervid period for the clean movement." Merrick of Ain't It Cool News claimed, "I doubt edited-video supporters will really enjoy the film, but the rest of us should have a pretty darn good time." MetroActive.com called the film, "...a terrific tale..." The Orlando Sentinel gave the film 3/4 stars and said, "...these 'censorship' issues are still with us and as [it] points out, both sides have a point." Greig Dymond of CBC News called the film, "compelling," and said, "that [the film] deserves to find an audience beyond the festival circuit." Jimmy Martin of SLUG Magazine described the film as, "...a powerful, poignant and balanced exploration..."

=== Accolades ===
Ceremony	Award	Date of ceremony	Result	Ref(s)
New York United Film Festival	Best Documentary		Won	
