= 3 Stolen Cameras =

Documentary film

- Production companies: RåFILM; Équipe Média
- Release date: 2017 (DOK Leipzig)
- Running time: 17 minutes
- Countries: Sweden; Spain
- Language: Arabic

3 Stolen Cameras is a Sahrawi documentary film, produced by RåFILM and Équipe Média. It is a Swedish coproduction filmed in Arabic. Premiered in 2017 at DOK Leipzig, it was nominated in the best short documentary category. Originally intended to be premiered at Lebanon, the Moroccan government boycotted it.

The film tells the story behind Équipe Média and its struggle while doing journalism at Western Sahara and their relationship with Morocco's government. The title references the efforts made by the activists in order to protect their filming material.

== See also ==
- Stolen (2009 Australian film)
