= The Armoire =

- Directed by: Jamie Travis
- Written by: Jamie Travis
- Produced by: Mark Montefiore
- Starring: William Cuddy; Ricardo Hoyos; Penelope Corrin; Tammy Isbell
- Cinematography: Catherine Lutes
- Edited by: Matthew Hannam
- Music by: Alfredo Santa Ana
- Production company: Lardux Films
- Release date: 2009
- Running time: 22 minutes
- Country: Canada
- Language: English

The Armoire is a 2009 Canadian short drama film directed by Jamie Travis. The third film in his Saddest Children in the World trilogy following Why the Anderson Children Didn't Come to Dinner and The Saddest Boy in the World, the film stars William Cuddy as Aaron, a young boy whose friend Tony (Ricardo Hoyos) has gone missing during a game of hide and seek, who is undergoing hypnosis to determine whether he can remember anything that may assist in locating Tony.

The film received an honourable mention for Best Canadian Short Film at the 2009 Toronto International Film Festival, and was named to TIFF's year-end Canada's Top Ten list for 2009. It subsequently won the awards for Best Short Film at the 2010 Victoria Film Festival, the 2010 Inside Out Film and Video Festival, the 2010 Nashville Film Festival, and the 53rd San Francisco International Film Festival.
