= Dollhouse (film) =

2012 Irish film

- Theatrical film poster
- Directed by: Kirsten Sheridan
- Written by: Kirsten Sheridan
- Produced by: John Wallace
- Starring: Seána Kerslake; Johnny Ward; Jack Reynor; Deirdre O'Kane
- Cinematography: Colin Downey; Ross McDonnell
- Edited by: Kirsten Sheridan
- Music by: Howie B
- Release dates: February 10, 2012 (Berlin); December 7, 2012 (Ireland)
- Running time: 95 mins.
- Country: Ireland
- Language: English

Dollhouse is a 2012 Irish drama film, directed, written, and edited by Kirsten Sheridan. It stars Seána Kerslake, Johnny Ward, Jack Reynor, and Deirdre O'Kane. It premiered at the Berlin International Film Festival in 2012, before being released in Ireland later that year.

== Synopsis ==
A group of street teens from Dublin's inner city break into a house in an upper class suburb. The break-in quickly moves into a night of frenzy, scandal and consequence.

== Cast ==
- Seána Kerslake as Jeannie
- Johnny Ward as Eanna
- Shane Curry as Shane
- Kate Stanley-Brennan as Denise
- Ciarán McCabe as Darren
- Jack Reynor as Robbie
- Conor Neary as Tim
- Deirdre O'Kane as Mum
- Peter Gowen as Dad

== Reception ==
David Rooney of The Hollywood Reporter commended filmmaker Kirsten Sheridan for "showing considerable skill at planting a visceral charge". Dave Gammon of Horror News lauded the performances, particularly "dark horse" Seána Kerslake. The Playlist praised the performances as well, including Jack Reynor and Johnny Ward, likening the film to A Clockwork Orange (1971) and Lord of the Flies (1963). Bradley Whitehead of Letterboxd gave it 5/5 stars, comparing it to David Lynch and Darren Aronofsky films.

However, Vladan Petković of Cineuropa chided the hand-held camerawork that "feels more like strange music videos than a film". Fionnuala Halligan of Screen Daily called the film "a thankless exercise". Leslie Halperin of Variety dubbed it "Lord of the Flies with pharmaceuticals", but complained that Sheridan's "schematic strategy of improvisation" fell flat.

Brian Lloyd at Film Ireland opined, "While some scenes can and do work better when improvised, here it seems that the word 'fuck' was added on to every sentence to make it seem convincing and real. Instead, it comes off as hollow." Alan Corr of RTÉ graded it 2/5 stars and derided it as "frustrating and uneven", likening it to a British version of Kids (1995); but enjoyed the "hallucinogenic longueurs" from Howie B's soundtrack.

Laura Canning of Estudios Irlandeses said they "aimed for a cross between Skins (2007–2013) and Funny Games (1997)", then stated, "Instead, we are given an overgrown short film, an experimental narrative that continually seeks to exceed the limits of its own boundaries, but unfortunately rarely succeeds." And Luke Watkinson of Letterboxd rated it 1.5/5 stars, decrying its ending.
