= Jamie Travis =

Canadian film director

- Born: August 13, 1979 (age 47); Canada
- Occupations: Film director, screenwriter

Jamie Travis (born August 13, 1979) is a Toronto-based filmmaker who has written and directed award-winning short films, music videos and television commercials. He received international recognition for his two short film trilogies, The Patterns and The Saddest Children in the World

His six short films all premiered at the Toronto International Film Festival, and his work has had numerous retrospective screenings at festivals and art galleries.

== Life and career ==
Travis’ graduating short film, Why the Anderson Children Didn't Come to Dinner (2003), is a surrealist portrayal of three young siblings forced to endure their mother's bizarre culinary abuses. The film earned numerous awards, including Best Production Design at the Leo Awards, Best Script at the Golden Sheaf Awards and Best Canadian Film at Montreal's Prends ça court! Film Series.

With Patterns (2005) – a playful avant-garde send-up of the suspense genre in which a woman waits anxiously for a phone call – Travis was awarded the Vancouver International Film Festival's prize for Best Western Canadian Director of a Short Film. Patterns was followed by two sequels, Patterns 2 (2006) and Patterns 3 (2006), which transformed the austere formalism of the first installment into a boy-meets-girl romp, complete with song, dance and documentary interludes. Other festival highlights include the BFI's London Lesbian and Gay Film Festival and the Hamptons International Film Festival, where Patterns 3 took home the award for Best Short Film.

A dark comedy about a nine-year-old who plans to close his birthday party with a suicide, The Saddest Boy in the World (2006) firmly planted Travis on the international map. The film was met with favorable press, with upwards of 150 festival screenings and multiple awards, including Best Canadian Short at the Calgary International Film Festival, Best Short Film at the Victoria Film Festival in British Columbia, and Audience Favorite at the NexT International Short Film Festival in Bucharest.

Travis concluded his Saddest Children in the World trilogy with The Armoire (2009), in which a game of hide and seek goes awry. Upon its premiere, the film received an honourable mention for Best Canadian Short Film at the 2009 Toronto International Film Festival, and a coveted spot on TIFF's year-end Canada's Top Ten list. It has also gone on to win Best Live-Action Short at the 2010 Nashville Film Festival and Best Short Film at the 53rd San Francisco International Film Festival.

Travis has also directed music videos for renowned Canadian indie artists Tegan and Sara and crafted television commercials for prominent brands and organizations. He is currently developing his feature film debut.

Travis lived in Vancouver for over 25 years. He is Jewish on his father's side. He is out as gay.

== Filmography ==
=== Short and feature films ===
- Why the Anderson Children Didn't Come to Dinner (2003)
- Patterns (2005)
- Patterns 2 (2006)
- Patterns 3 (2006)
- The Saddest Boy in the World (2006)
- The Armoire (2009)
- Seven Sins: Greed (2011)
- Kouchibouguac (2011)
- For a Good Time, Call... (2012)
- Angry Angel (TV movie; 2017)

=== Television series ===
- Finding Carter (2 episodes; 2014)
- Faking It (13 episodes; 2014-2016)
- Scream: The TV Series (4 episodes; 2015-2016)
- The Bold Type (6 episodes; 2017-2019)
- Claws (5 episodes; 2017-2019)
- Star (1 episode; 2018)
- Charmed (1 episode; 2018)
- Dare Me (2 episodes; 2020)
- Panic (2 episodes; 2021)
- Yellowjackets (1 episode; 2021)
- A Friend of the Family (2 episodes; 2022)
- It: Welcome to Derry (1 episode; 2025)

== Music videos ==
- "Back in Your Head" by Tegan and Sara (2007)
- "Hell" by Tegan and Sara (2010)

== DVD ==
Kimstim is releasing The Patterns Trilogy along with Why the Anderson Children Didn't Come to Dinner and The Saddest Boy in the World in one comprehensive package on August 3.

The Armoire will be included in issue no. 12 of Wholphin, a quarterly DVD magazine created by Dave Eggers and Brent Hoff of McSweeney's publishing house.
