= Colony (2009 film) =

2009 Irish documentary film

- Directed by: Carter Gunn; Ross McDonnell
- Produced by: Morgan Bushe; Macdara Kelleher
- Cinematography: Ross McDonnell
- Edited by: Carter Gunn
- Music by: Clogs
- Production company: Fastnet Films
- Release date: 12 September 2009 (TIFF)
- Running time: 85 minutes
- Country: Ireland
- Language: English

Colony is a 2009 Irish documentary film about colony collapse disorder, directed by Carter Gunn and Ross McDonnell. The film was produced by Morgan Bushe and Macdara Kelleher. The music was written by Clogs. It opened theatrically in Los Angeles on 30 July 2010 and New York City on 13 August 2010 at the 14th Annual DocuWeeks.

== Plot ==
The documentary explores the disappearance of millions of bees, known as "colony collapse syndrome."
