= Should I Really Do It? =

- Directed by: Ismail Necmi
- Written by: Ismail Necmi
- Produced by: Ismail Necmi; Ayşe Ünal; Alexandre Mroz Tastardi
- Starring: Petra Woschniak; HEROLD
- Cinematography: Ismail Necmi
- Edited by: Ismail Necmi
- Music by: Serkan Alkan
- Release date: 2008
- Running time: 86 minutes
- Country: Turkey
- Languages: Turkish; German

Should I Really Do It? (Bunu Gerçekten Yapmalı Mıyım?) is a 2008 feature film written and directed by Ismail Necmi, starring Petra Woschniak and HEROLD.

The film is a hybrid documentary and fictional feature, following the life of Petra, a German woman living in Istanbul. It is an ironic inversion of more conventional tales of Turkish migrants to Germany. Edgy and surreal, the film plays on concepts of real life and drama, reworking the cult genre of Turkish Fantastic Cinema as it interweaves apparently everyday sequences of Petra's life with increasingly fantastic sessions between her and mysterious, masked HEROLD.

== Synopsis ==
This real-life feature follows the life of Petra, a German woman living in Istanbul, in an ironic inversion of the story of Turkish migrants to Germany. During 'sessions' with the mysterious, masked HEROLD, her life unfolds : Istanbul, Germany, family, friends, drugs and death. “Should I Really Do It?” plays with these concepts of real life and fiction, documentary and drama.

== Critical reception ==
The film was discussed by Turkish critics Feride Çiçekoğlu and Fatih Özgüven in the June 2008 issue of Altyazı magazine. Çiçekoğlu focused on the film's visual style and its movement between Petra's life in Istanbul and her relationship with her twin sister in Germany, describing the film as having a distinctive visual language. Özgüven described the film as difficult to classify, noting its movement between documentary and narrative cinema and its departure from conventional storytelling.

== Awards ==
- Daniel Langlois Innovation Award – 38th Montreal International Festival du Nouveau Cinéma 2009 – International Competition
- Most Promising New Director Award – 20th Ankara International Film Festival 2009 – National Competition
- Most Promising New Screenwriter Award – 20th Ankara International Film Festival 2009 – National Competition
- Audience Choice Award – 1st Rome Gender DocuFilm Festival 2010 – International Competition

== Special screenings ==
- Conference Opening Film – An Interdisciplinary Conference on Fetishism – “Substitute Lack! / Accept No Substitutes!” – Istanbul MODERN – Museum of Modern Art
- Conference Opening Film – New Directions in Turkish Film Studies Conference IX – "Cinema and Reality" – Istanbul Kadir Has University
- Special Presentation – "Women in a Midlife Crisis" – Neues Kino Basel – Switzerland

== Festivals 2009 – 2010 ==
- 34th Toronto International Film Festival 2009 – Official Selection – Discovery
- 38th Montreal International Festival du Nouveau Cinéma 2009 – International Competition – Louve d’Or – Daniel Langlois Innovation Award
- 6th Reykjavik International Film Festival 2009 – International Competition – New Visions
- 25th Haifa International Film Festival 2009 – International Fipresci Competition – New Directors / New Horizons
- 33rd São Paulo International Film Festival 2009 – International Competition – New Directors
- 1st Rome Gender DocuFilm Festival 2010 – International Competition – Visions Around The Body – Audience Choice Award
- 17th Hamburg International Film Festival 2009 – Official Selection – Agenda 09
- 33rd Cairo International Film Festival 2009 – Official Selection – Festival of Festivals
- 7th World Film Festival of Bangkok 2009 – Official Selection – World Cinema: Cinema Beat
- 11th Mumbai Film Festival 2009 – Official Selection – Above the Cut
- 11th Thessaloniki Documentary Festival 2009 – Official Selection – Portraits: Human Journeys
- 3rd Costa Rica International Film Festival 2009 – Official Selection – Montezuma
- 20th Ankara International Film Festival 2009 – National Competition – Most Promising New Director Award – Most Promising New Screenwriter Award
- 33rd Göteborg International Film Festival 2010 – Official Selection – New Visions
- 10th Wroclaw Era New Horizons International Film Festival 2010 – Official Selection – New Cinema of Turkey
