= Kelin =

Ancient Iberian city

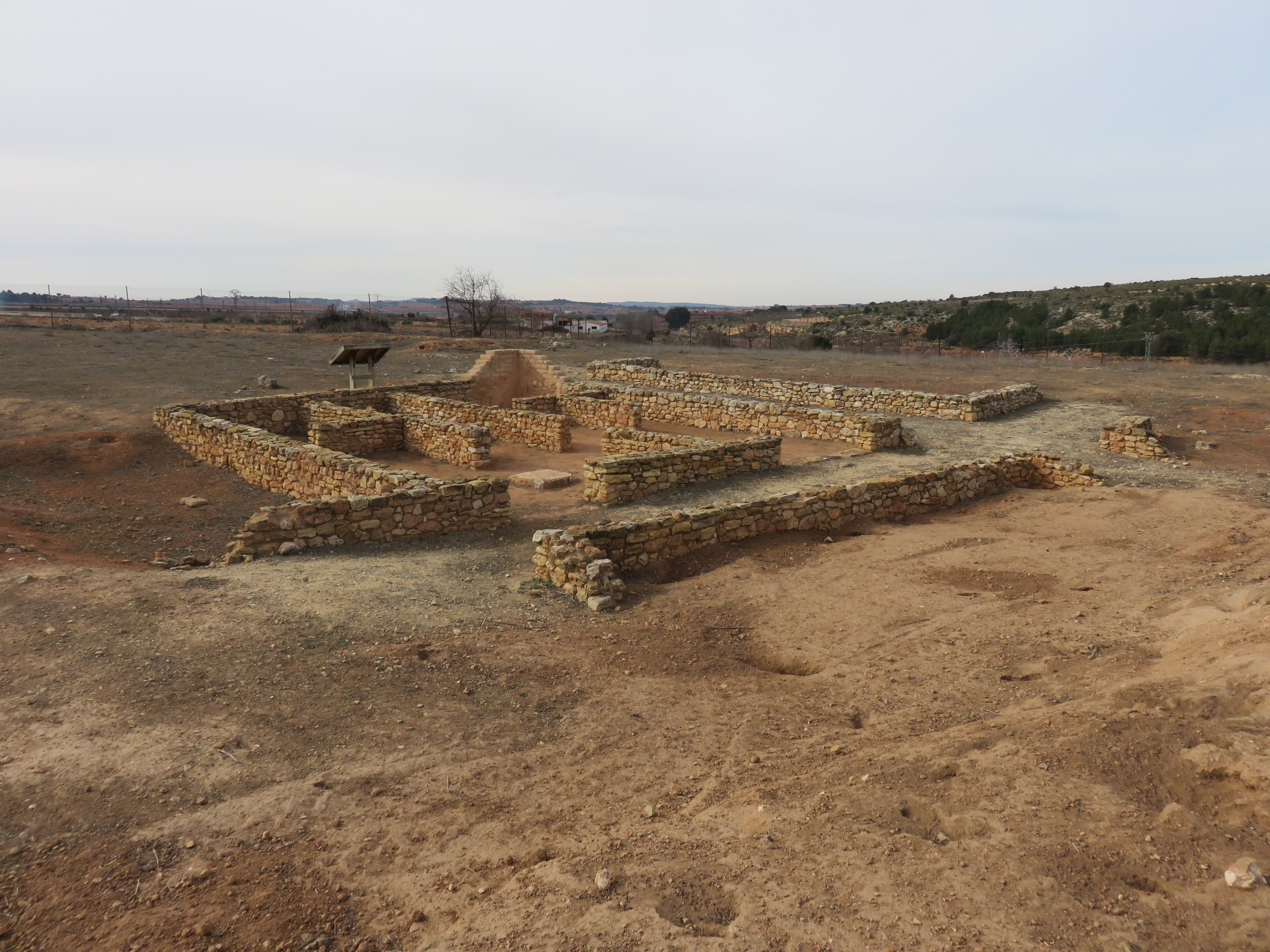
Remains of an Iberian house from the Archaeological Site of Kelin, (Caudete de las Fuentes, Valencia)

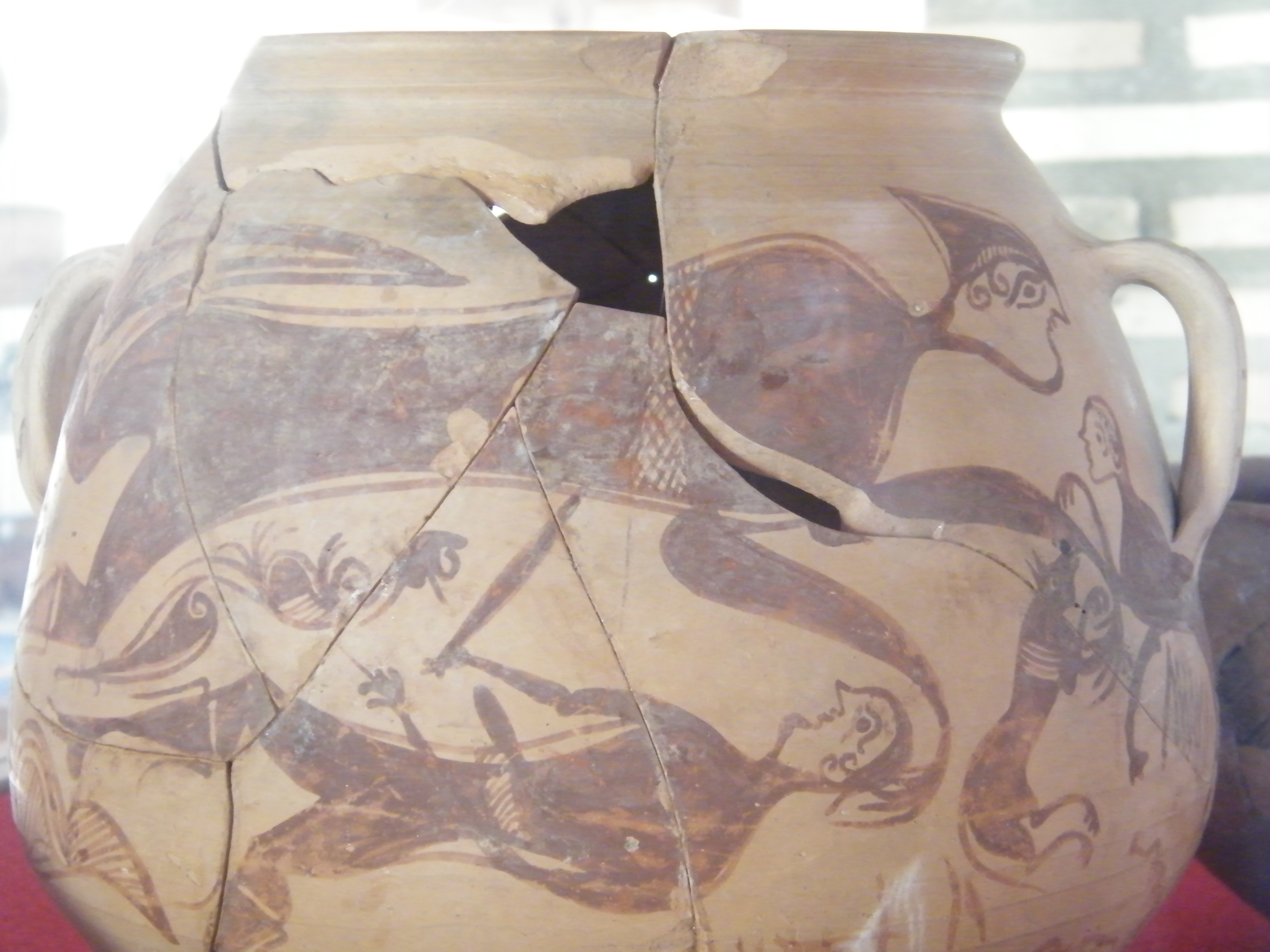
Painted Iberian storage container (Museum of Caudete de las Fuentes)

Kelin was an ancient Iberian city located on the hill of Los Villares (Caudete de las Fuentes, Valencia). The site was inhabited from the Proto-Iberian period (7th century BC) to the Late Iberian period (2nd to 1st centuries BC). The site was walled and covered around 10 hectares. The archaeological site has been known from the mid-18th century, although it was first excavated archaeologically in 1956, with later campaigns as recent as 2011.

== Toponymy ==
Coins with the name 'Kelin' written in Iberian script have been found both at the site and through the Iberian Peninsula. The coins are Iberian ases and semis and were minted sometime between the mid-2nd and early 1st centuries BC.

Remains found around Caudete de las Fuentes itself indicate that the main settlement moved to the banks of the Madre river following romanisation of the area from the 2nd century BC. From this new location arose the Latin name Caput Aquae (water source) from which the name of the modern town derives, via Muslim Qabdaq and Valencian Cabdet.

== Iberian polity? ==
Kelin may have been the capital of a complex Iberian polity covering much of the submeseta de Utiel-Requena. At 10 hectares in size, and with perhaps around 3,800 inhabitants, Kelin is the largest known Iberian site in the area. Throughout its long occupation, the site has a greatest range of imports in the submeseta, suggesting it dominated trading and distribution networks. More written material has also been found at the site than at its neighbours, and it appears to have been the only site to mint coins during the Roman Republican period. Taken together, these indicators suggest Kelin was at least the pre-eminent site in the area, and may perhaps have acted as a form of capital controlling the surrounding area.

== Description of the site ==
Two zones of house remains can be seen at the present site, showing the evolution of building styles from the 7th to 2nd century BC. The houses have elongated rectangular rooms with few internal divisions. The materials used were a stone foundation and adobe brick walls. At the edge of the site, a section of wall is visible as well as a quarry which may have provided building material for the wall or houses. The pottery found at the site includes hand-made forms, some of which imitate wheel-made forms, as well as remains of amphorae, Western Phoenician storage containers and Iberian Red Slip ware.
