= Eamon (film) =

2009 Irish film

- Theatrical film poster
- Directed by: Margaret Corkery
- Written by: Margaret Corkery
- Produced by: Seamus Byrne
- Starring: Robert Donnelly; Amy Kirwan; Darren Healy; Mary Murray
- Cinematography: David Grennan
- Edited by: Mairéad McIvor
- Music by: Miriam Ingram; Colin J. Morris
- Release dates: July 5, 2009 (Karlovy Vary); February 5, 2010 (Ireland)
- Running time: 86 mins.
- Country: Ireland
- Language: English

Eamon is a 2009 Irish dark comedy film, written and directed by Margaret Corkery. It stars Robert Donnelly, Amy Kirwan, Darren Healy, and Mary Murray. It premiered at Karlovy Vary International Film Festival in 2009, before being released in Ireland in 2010.

== Synopsis ==
A family holiday brings to a head the destructive "love triangle" between Eamon, a little boy with behavioral problems, his selfish mother Grace and his sexually frustrated father Daniel.

== Cast ==
- Robert Donnelly as Eamon
- Amy Kirwan as Grace
- Darren Healy as Daniel
- Mary Murray as Freda
- Deirdre Monaghan as Grace's Mom
- Phyllis MacMahon as Grand Aunt

== Reception ==
Alissa Simon of Variety praised the film, stating "An entertainingly horrific vision of the Oedipus Complex in action, this confidently stylized debut feature from writer-helmer Margaret Corkery plays like the offspring of Aki Kaurismäki and Todd Solondz." James McMahon of RTÉ rated it 3/5 stars and lauded Robert Donnelly for creating "a wonderfully creepy" character.

However, Seán Walsh of Letterboxd opined that the film has "intolerably contrived dialogue and plot progressions, only rarely funny, far too drawn out and wasteful in its use of the film's duration".
