= Mike J. Nichols =

American film editor

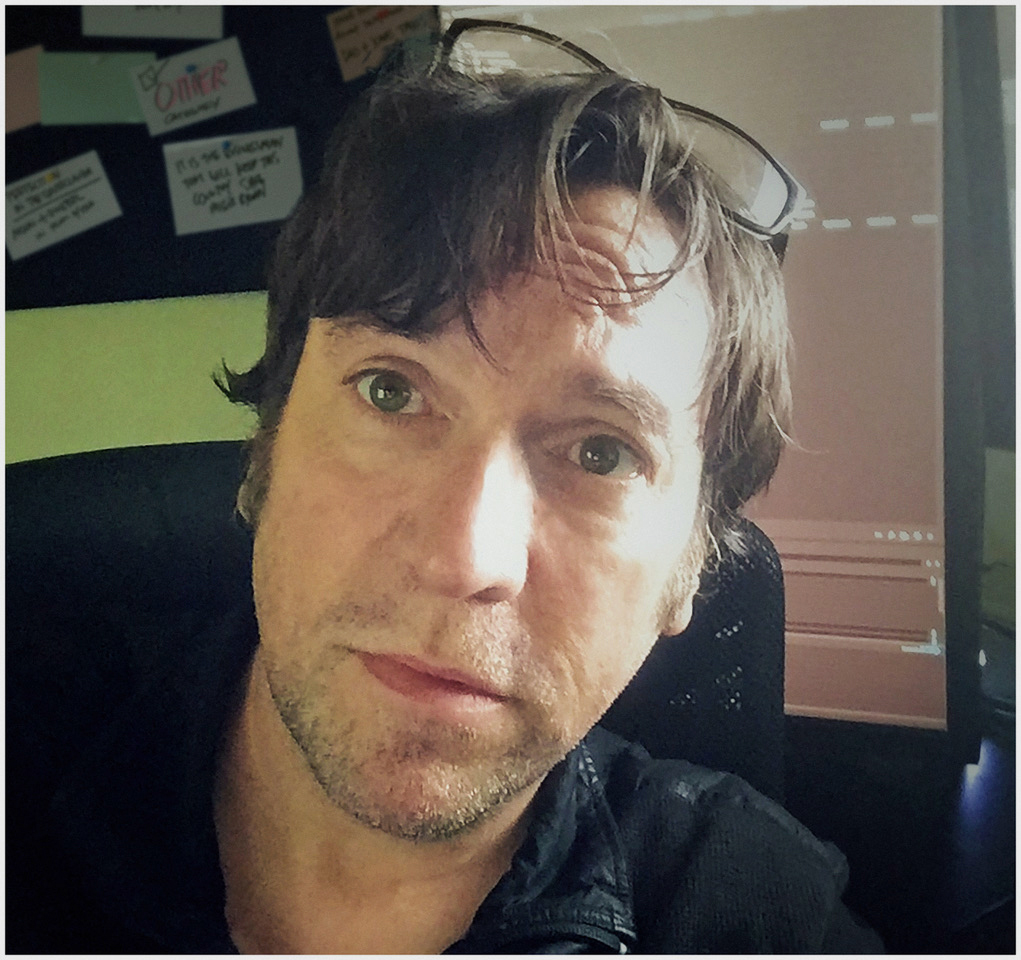
- Occupations: Producer, director, writer, film editor
- Known for: The Phantom Edit, The Last Play at Shea, and Zappa

Mike J. Nichols is a producer, director, writer, and an American film editor originally from Illinois currently living and working in Los Angeles.

== Early career ==
Mike J. Nichols created a re-cut of George Lucas' Star Wars: Episode I – The Phantom Menace known as The Phantom Edit. According to the re-done scroll, the self-proclaimed "Phantom Editor" stated he had re-edited a standard VHS version of The Phantom Menace into what he believed was "a much stronger version of the film".

== Film career ==
Nichols has multiple credits on feature-length documentary films. He edited The Last Play at Shea (2010), which premiered at the Tribeca Film Festival and at Citi Field in New York, for the largest movie exhibition since 1919. In addition to editing, he also wrote Echo in the Canyon (2018) which won Hollywood Music In Media Awards' award for Best Music Documentary/Special Program. He both edited and produced the documentary film Zappa (2020), an official selection of the South by Southwest Film Festival and nominated for Critics Choice Movie Awards for Best Music Documentary.

In 2020, Nichols made his directorial debut on the film festival circuit with his short film World Premiere Video: The Music Video that survived after Music Television didn't. The film is about how he found a Super8 music video he made thirty years ago which was thought lost in a fire. His film was the official selection for six film festivals in 2020: Independent Shorts Awards (Honorable Mention for Best Editing), Mindfield Film Festival Albuquerque (Winner of Best @ Home COVID-19 Documentary Short/Music Video Diamond Award), HollyShorts Film Festival (Shot On Film Super 8 Winner presented by Kodak), Short To The Point (Winner of Best Documentary), IndieX Film Fest, and Doc LA (Winner of Best Music Documentary Award (short)). In 2021, it was an official selection for Dances With Films (Los Angeles).

== Television career ==
Mike J. Nichols rarely works in a single capacity on a project. He provided editorial and special effects services for Warren Littlefield on Style Network's series "Foody Call," which Time Magazine listed as one of the "6 Shows Worth Their Salt." On Fuel TV, Nichols wrote, produced, and edited Bas Rutten's series "Punk Payback." He wrote, directed, produced, and edited Bert Kreischer's internet show for Scripps Network "What Would the Maid Think?"

Additionally, Nichols created the internet series, Two Guys Drinking at a Bar, with Kevin Farley and Paul Preston.
