= Dan Fallshaw =

Australian filmmaker

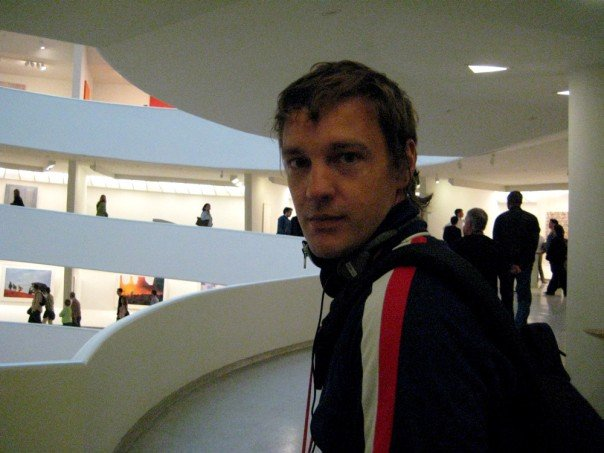
- Fallshaw at Guggenheim Museum 2010
- Born: Daniel Fallshaw; 7 March 1973 (age 52); Sydney, Australia
- Occupation(s): Filmmaker, producer, editor, cinematographer

Dan Fallshaw (born 7 March 1973 in Sydney) is an Australian filmmaker, producer, editor and cinematographer best known for the documentary Stolen (2009), that uncovers slavery in the Sahrawi refugee camps in south-western Algeria and in Western Sahara. The film, which was co-directed with Violeta Ayala, premiered at the Sydney Film Festival in 2009 and screened internationally at the Toronto International Film Festival. The film was broadcast on PBS in 2013.

In 2006 Fallshaw began his collaboration with Ayala on Between the oil and the deep blue sea, a documentary set in Mauritania, about corruption in the oil industry, that follows the investigations of mathematician Yahyia Ould Hamidoune against Woodside Petroleum.

Fallshaw is an alumnus of the Independent Documentary Lab and a Tribeca Film Institute Fellow. He won Best Editor at the 2010 Documentary Edge Festival for Stolen.

Other accolades include Best Feature Doc at the 2010 Pan African Film Festival in Los Angeles, Grand Prix at the 2010 Art of the Document Film Festival in Warsaw, Golden Oosikar Best Doc at the 2010 Anchorage International Film Festival, Best Doc at the 2010 African Film Festival in Nigeria, Audience Award at the 2010 Amnesty International Film Festival in Montreal, and Best Film at the 2010 Festival Internacional de Cine de Cuenca in Ecuador.
