= If I Knew What You Said =

2009 Filipino film

If I Knew What You Said (Filipino: Dinig Sana Kita) is a 2009 Filipino drama/romance film directed and written by Mike Sandejas.

== Plot ==
The romantic film revolved around a rocker and a deaf boy. One lives in silence while other in noise and fear. The two met in a Baguio camp where hearing kids were mixed with non-hearing kids to find their common ground, which is their love for music.

== Cast ==
- Zoe Sandejas as Nina Sevilla
- Romalito Mallari as Kiko Reyes
- Adriana Agcaoili as Mrs. Sevilla
- Bronson Escalderon as Joseph

== Release ==
The film was released on 16 October 2009 and produced under Cinemalaya and Echo and Mirage Entertainment.

== Reception ==
Dinig Sana Kita is the first and only Filipino film to cast a deaf actor. Romalito Mallari is deaf in real life and is a performer for several stage productions.
