= Ross McDonnell =

Irish cinematographer (1979–2023)

- Undated photo of McDonnell
- Born: 29 October 1979; Howth, Dublin, Ireland
- Died: 5 November 2023 (aged 44); New York City, US
- Occupations: Filmmaker; photographer
- Notable work: Colony; Elián; The First Wave

Ross McDonnell (29 October 1979 – 5 November 2023) was an Irish film director, cinematographer, and photographer. He was born in Howth, Dublin. He co-created his directorial debut Colony with Carter Gunn in 2009. It won the International Documentary Film Festival Amsterdam's Award for Best First Appearance, and the Grand Jury Prize for Best Feature Film at the Anaheim International Film Festival. He won two Emmy Awards; one for the Showtime series The Trade, and the other for the documentary The First Wave. He drowned at Fort Tilden beach in Queens. He was reported missing on 4 November, with his torso and legs being discovered on Breezy Point beach on 17 November.

== Career ==
From 2005 to 2008, during the Ballymun Regeneration, McDonnell documented and photographed the Ballymun Housing Estate that contained the Ballymun Flats for a photo book. McDonnell's directorial debut was on the 2009 Irish documentary film Colony, that he co-created with Carter Gunn. The film focused on colony collapse disorder, and the effects on individual beekeepers, mainly the struggling Christian fundamentalist Seppi family from Pixley, California. McDonnell acted as the film's director and photographer, with Variety describing his photography as "intimate portraits that are visually fantastic, tactile and startling". The film won the International Documentary Film Festival Amsterdam's Award for Best First Appearance in 2009. It also shared the Grand Jury Prize for Best Feature Film with Eighteen (2010) at the Anaheim International Film Festival.

Inspired by his previous researching of Ballymun, he released the film Remember Me, My Ghost in 2011. McDonnell was granted a commission from the Irish Film Board (now Screen Ireland), and returned to researching Ballymun from 2010 to 2011. When he returned, the blocks of flats he had previously researched were demolished. The film consists of monochrome still images of Ballymun, with narration about a woman's experiences living in the flats with an abusive boyfriend. The Irish Film Institute considered it to be personalising the story of Ballymun as a haunted estate, where "memoires good and bad still linger".

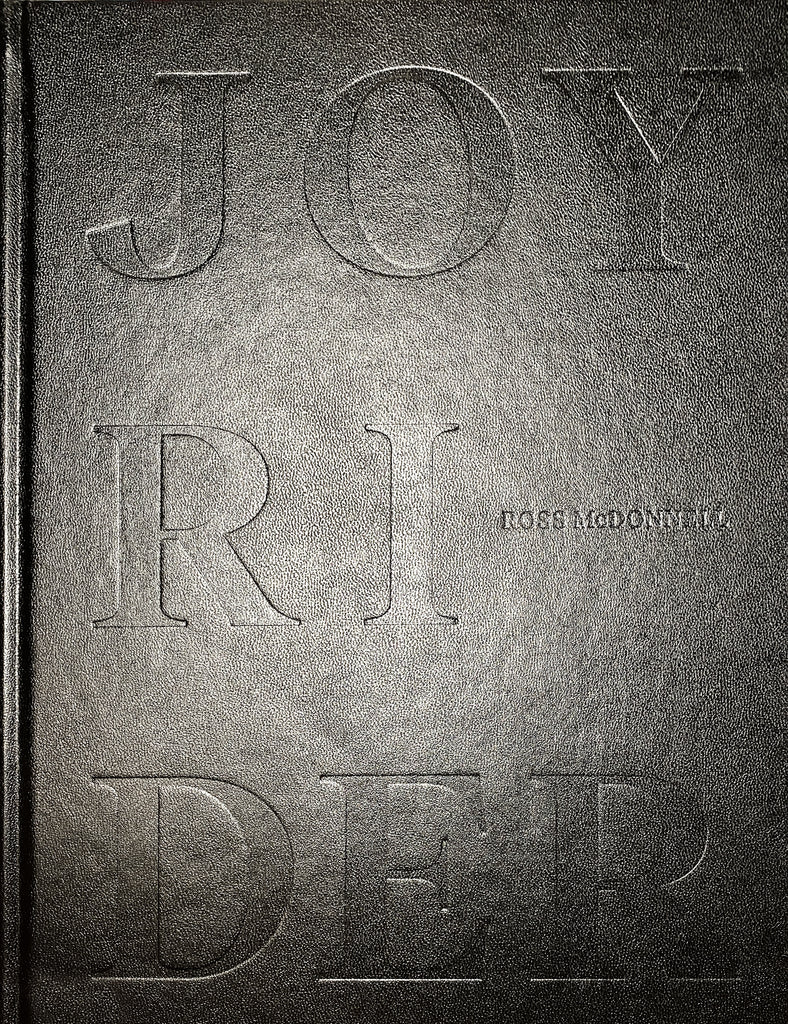
Joyrider's book cover

He did the cinematography for the 2012 film Dollhouse with Colin Downey, the 2012 film Snake Dance with Renaat Lambeets, and the 2015 film Life is Sacred with Viviana Gomez Echeberry and Andreas Dalsgaard. In 2015, he created the documentary AKA Lonely with Casey Brooks and Charlie Phillips for The Guardian. The documentary is about Antonio Guiterrez, a member of the vigilante group Autodefensas from Michoacan, Mexico. McDonnell first started following the Autodefensas in 2012, conducting photojournalism and taking ambrotypes of the group in collaboration with the Galeria Grafika LaEstampa in Mexico City. He did the cinematography for the 2016 documentary film Forever Pure with Sergei Freedman and Yaniv Linton.

In 2017, he co-created the documentary Elián with Tim Golden. The documentary is about the life of Elián González, the only survivor from a refugee boat going from Cuba to Florida. He was found clinging to an inner tube near Fort Lauderdale in 1999. It received an Emmy nomination for Outstanding Investigative Documentary. McDonnell did the cinematography for the 2017 documentary No Stone Unturned with Stan Harlow, the 2017 documentary A Mother Brings Her Son to Be Shot alongside Richard Kendrick, Edna O'Dowd, Sinead O'Shea, and Paddy Stevenson, the 2018 documentary One Million American Dreams alongside Stephen McCarthy, Mark Garrett, Jake Swantko, and Charlotte Kaufman, the 2019 documentary Jihad Jane, and the Showtime series The Trade.

In 2021 he released Joyrider, the aforementioned photo book. It is a coming-of-age story set in Ballymun. That same year, he won the Emmy Award for Outstanding Cinematography: Documentary at the 42nd News and Documentary Emmy Awards for his work on The Trade. In 2022, he acted as the co-producer for The First Wave, which earned him another Emmy Award for Outstanding Cinematography: Documentary, and earned him a nomination for the Best Cinematography award at the 2021 IDA Awards. He also did cinematography for the Edge of the Unknown with Jimmy Chin. In 2023, he created the documentary Swift Justice with Victor Blue for The New Yorker. It is about the lives of Afghan women living under Sharia courts in Afghanistan. While recording Swift Justice, he was temporarily followed and jailed by the Taliban. He also did some cinematography for the 2024 film Photographer. On the weekend before his disappearance, he was photographing a protest against the Israeli invasion of Gaza.

== Personal life and death ==
McDonnell was born in Howth in Dublin, Ireland on 29 October 1979. He attended St Andrew's College in Booterstown, County Dublin, earned a communication degree in Dublin City University, and completed a Master of Arts in film production at TU Dublin. He moved to the US in 2003. Before his death, he lived in an apartment in Brooklyn's Bedford-Stuyvesant neighbourhood. His living relatives are his parents Maureen and Nicky, his sister Louise and niece Eva.

McDonnell was last seen alive in New York City on 4 November 2023, leaving his apartment on a bicycle, wearing a red North Face vest, a black North Face backpack, black and white sneakers, and khaki pants. He went swimming and drowned at Fort Tilden beach in Queens at 44 years old. His bike was discovered later that day locked at Fort Tilden, and he was reported missing. On 17 November, a torso and legs on the Breezy Point beach were reported to the New York Police Department. The body was identified as McDonnell's by a distinctive birthmark on his neck. His family announced on RIP.ie that he died on 5 November.
