= Life Begins (2009 film) =

2009 Canadian film

- French: La Vie commence
- Directed by: Émile Proulx-Cloutier
- Written by: Émile Proulx-Cloutier
- Produced by: Élaine Hébert
- Starring: Jacques Girard; Maxime Dumontier; Vincent Proulx-Hébert; Anfée Tremblay-Proulx
- Cinematography: Carlos Ferrand
- Edited by: Stéphane Lafleur
- Distributed by: micro_scope
- Release date: August 11, 2009 (Locarno)
- Running time: 14 minutes
- Country: Canada
- Language: French

Life Begins (French: La Vie commence) is a Canadian short drama film, directed by Émile Proulx-Cloutier and released in 2009. The film centres on 24 hours in the life of a dysfunctional family who do not communicate well.

The film stars Jacques Girard as the father, and Maxime Dumontier, Vincent Proulx-Hébert and Anfée Tremblay-Proulx as his children.

The film premiered on August 11, 2009 at the Locarno Film Festival, and had its Canadian premiere at the 2009 Toronto International Film Festival.

== Cast ==
- Maxime Dumontier as Older Brother
- Jacques Girard as Father
- Vincent Proulx-Hébert as Younger Brother
- Anfée Tremblay-Proulx as Young Girl

== Awards and nominations ==
It was also screened at the 2009 Festival du nouveau cinéma, where it received an honorable mention from the jury for the Best Canadian Short Film Award, and at the 2009 Whistler Film Festival, where it won the ShortWork Award.

The film was named to TIFF's year-end Canada's Top Ten list for 2009.

It was a Genie Award nominee for Best Live Action Short Drama at the 30th Genie Awards in 2010.
