= Violeta Ayala =

Bolivian film director

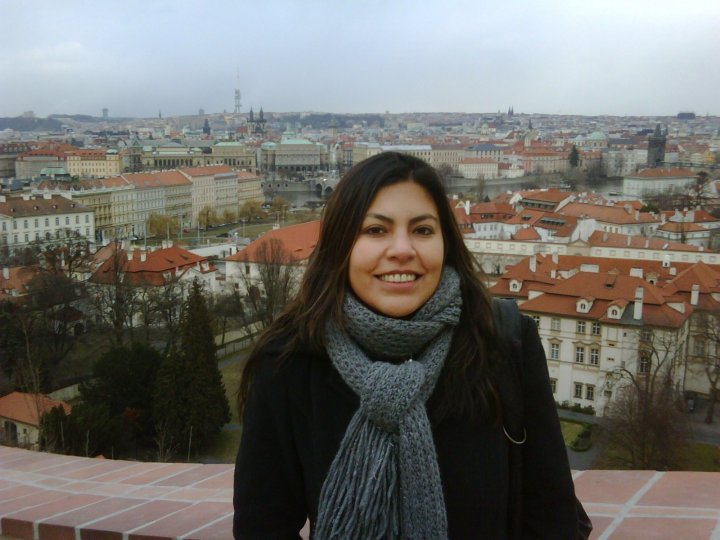
- Violeta Ayala.
- Born: Violeta Michelle Ayala Grageda; 16 February 1978 (age 48); Cochabamba, Bolivia
- Occupations: Film director, producer, writer, artist
- Spouse: Dan Fallshaw (m. 2012)
- Children: 1

Violeta Ayala (born Violeta Michelle Ayala Grageda; 16 February 1978) is a Bolivian-Australian Quechua filmmaker, artist and technologist. Her credits include Huk, The Jaguaress (2025), Las Awichas (2024), Prison X – The Devil & The Sun (2021) and the documentaries La Lucha (2023), Cocaine Prison (2017), The Fight (2017), The Bolivian Case (2015), and Stolen (2009).In 2026, Ayala was appointed a Mozilla Fellow. Her fellowship project, Paqarina is a motion capture and machine learning pipeline for Indigenous movement and community data sovereignty. Ayala co-founded sala.red, an independent investigative outlet that reports on Bolivia in Spanish and English.

== Early life and education ==
Ayala was born in Cochabamba, Bolivia in 1978, the daughter of Fanny Grageda and Efrain Ayala. Ayala's maternal grandfather was the political Quechua leader Vitaliano Grageda, He was one of the founders and a former Secretary General of the Confederation of Peasant Workers of Bolivia. Vitaliano Grageda was an active member of The Communist Party of Bolivia.

Her mother was a biochemist and had a pharmacy, her father immigrated to Sydney, Australia when Ayala was a child. She has two half-brothers from her mother's subsequent relationship with doctor Roly Elias. She grew up in the south part of Cochabamba, one of the city's poorest areas. Following her mother's death in 1995, Ayala immigrated to Australia.

Ayala is a graduate of Charles Sturt University where she majored in Broadcast Journalism.

== Film career ==
In 2006 Ayala began her collaboration with Dan Fallshaw on Between the Oil and the Deep Blue Sea, a documentary set in Mauritania, about corruption in the oil industry, that follows the investigations of mathematician Yahyia Ould Hamidoune against Woodside Petroleum. On the same subject Ayala co-wrote Slick Operator an article published in the front page of The Sydney Morning Herald.

Ayala's feature directorial debut, the highly controversial documentary Stolen (2009), premiered internationally at the Toronto International Film Festival in September 2009.

In 2015 Ayala made The Bolivian Case, a feature about a high profile case concerning three Norwegian teenage girls caught with 22 kg of cocaine in an airport in Bolivia. The film was shot in Cochabamba and Oslo, premiered in the Special Presentation Program at Toronto's Hot Docs Canadian International Documentary Festival in May 2015, has won an audience award at the Sydney Film Festival and was shortlisted for Platino Awards and Premios Fénix.

Ayala's short film The Fight (2017) focused on a protest by a group of people with disabilities that march across the Andes in wheelchairs and on foot for 35 days to the seat of the government in La Paz, asking to speak to President Evo Morales about a disability pension and were repressed by the police. The film was released worldwide by The Guardian in May 2017 and has won a Walkley Award, the Deutsche Welle Doc Dispatch Award at the Sheffield Doc/Fest, as well as a nomination for an IDA Documentary Award and was a finalist for the Rory Peck Sony Impact Award.

Ayala is an alumnus of the Film Independent Documentary Lab, the Berlinale Talent Campus, HotDocs Forum, Britdoc Good Pitch, IFP and a Sundance and Tribeca Film Institute fellow.

Ayala's documentary Cocaine Prison was filmed inside San Sebastian prison in Cochabamba, by the inmates themselves, giving a unique perspective on the foot soldiers of the drug trade. Cocaine Prison premiered at the Toronto International Film Festival in September 2017 and has won the audience award at the Rencontres Cinémas d'Amérique Latine de Toulouse.

In 2018, Ayala received a Jaime Escalante Medal in a ceremony organized by the Embassy of Bolivia in Washington, D.C.

In 2020, Ayala was invited to join the Academy of Motion Picture Arts and Sciences.

In 2021, Ayala's Prison X a virtual reality animated experience premiered at the Sundance Film Festival.

In 2023, La Lucha, premiered at the Blackstar Film Festival and SXSW Sydney. The documentary follows La Caravana, a significant disability rights protest in Bolivia, and its role in establishing a monthly pension for people with disabilities —earned Ayala the NYWIFT Award for Excellence in Documentary Directing.

In 2025, Ayala was invited to participate in Surreality, the world’s first large‑scale XR + AI art exhibition, organized by HKUST’s Center for Metaverse and Computational Creativity at its Guangzhou campus. The exhibition opened on June 26, 2025, and featured more than 50 artists. Ayala presented an expanded version of Las Awichas, alongside works that explore computational creativity rooted in Global South perspectives. She shared insights into recreating Indigenous mythological visuals via AI models and maintaining ethical awareness between cultural memory and technological mediation.

== Art and technology projects ==
Ayala created Las Awichas (Aymara for “grandmothers”), a series of AI‑generated digital portraits honouring her female ancestors. The exhibition opened on 21 September 2022 at the Martadero cultural centre in Cochabamba.

In July 2023 it was announced that Las Awichas had been selected for the new GLOW exhibition in London. The project was later presented, from March to April 2024, as a new commission on the Strand and inside King’s College London’s Bush House Arcade; the installation combined the digital portraits with augmented‑reality experiences, 3D‑printed Amazonian animals and hand‑woven textiles. Las Awichas won Best Interactive Experience at AIDC 2025.

In 2024 Ayala was selected for the inaugural Mila Quebec AI Art Residency, where she developed Huk, The Jaguaress, an interactive installation that combines robotic vision, real‑time generative video and a multilingual synthetic voice to personify an Indigenous AI guardian of the Amazon. The work premiered on 5 March 2025 in the INTER:ACTIVE programme of CPH:DOX at Kunsthal Charlottenborg, Copenhagen, and was shown out of competition from 9 to 13 April 2025 at the 8th NewImages Festival at the Forum Des Images in Paris.

== Personal life ==
Ayala has lived in Australia and the United States and has dual Bolivian-Australian nationality.

She is married to filmmaker Dan Fallshaw, with whom she has a child, born in June 2016.

== Controversy ==
In 2020, during the COVID-19 lockdown in Sydney, Ayala publicly supported the rent strike movement. Ayala's statement "People are losing their lives and livelihoods, we can’t see our loved ones, our five-year-old doesn’t go to school and the real estate agent says it’s business as usual?"

In 2022, Ayala criticized the Sundance Festival for hosting the movie Jihad Rehab, which interviewed former Guantánamo Bay prisoners. Ayala wrote on twitter that "an entirely white team" was "behind a film about Yemeni and South Arabian men." However, the film had a Yemeni-American executive producer and a Saudi co-producer.

== Filmography ==
- Proyecto Vila-Vila (2005, Documentary)
- Between The Oil and The Deep Blue Sea (2005, Documentary)
- Stolen (2009, Documentary)
- The Bolivian Case (2015, Documentary)
- The Fight (2017, Short Documentary)
- Cocaine Prison (2017, Documentary)
- Prison X (2021, VR Animation)
- La Lucha (2023, Documentary)
- Las Awichas (2024, AR Animation)
- Huk, The Jaguaress (2025, AI Animation)

== Awards ==
Year	Award	Category	Work	Result
2018	Toulouse Latin America Film Festival (France)	Audience Award	Cocaine Prison	Winner
2018	Artículo 31 Film Festival (Spain)	Desalambre Award	The Fight	Winner
2018	Tempo Documentary Festival (Sweden)	Stefan Jarl International Documentary Award	Cocaine Prison	Nominated
2017	Ida Awards (United States)	Best Short	The Fight	Nominated
2017	Walkley Award (Australia)	Best Cinematography	The Fight	Winner
2017	Rory Peck Awards (United Kingdom)	Sony Impact Award	The Fight	Finalist
2017	Camden International Film Festival (United States)	Best Documentary Feature	Cocaine Prison	Nominated
2017	Festival Internacional De Cine De Oruro Diablo De Oro	Best Documentary	The Fight	Winner
2017	Festival Internacional De Cine De Oruro Diablo De Oro (Bolivia)	Best Documentary	The Bolivian Case	Nominated
2017	Sheffield Doc/Fest (United Kingdom)	Doc Dispatch Award	The Fight	Winner
2017	Festival Internacional De Cine De Los Derechos Humanos De Bolivia – El Séptimo Ojo Es Tuyo (Bolivia)	Best Documentary	The Fight	Winner
2016	Ibermedia (Spain)	Distribution Award	The Bolivian Case	Winner
2016	Premios Platino (Uruguay)	Best Documentary	The Bolivian Case	Shortlisted
2016	Premios Fenix (Mexico)	Best Documentary	The Bolivian Case	Shortlisted
2015	Sydney Film Festival (Australia)	Audience Award	The Bolivian Case	3rd Runner-up
2010	Pan African Film Festival in Los Angeles (United States)	Best Documentary	Stolen	Winner
2010	Art of the Document Film Festival in Warsaw (Poland)	Best Documentary	Stolen	Winner
2010	Anchorage International Film Festival (United States)	Golden Oosikar Best Documentary	Stolen	Winner
2010	African Film Festival (Nigeria)	Best Documentary	Stolen	Winner
2010	Amnesty International Film Festival (Canada)	Audience Award	Stolen	Winner
2010	Festival Internacional De Cine De Cuenca (Ecuador)	Best Film	Stolen	Winner
2010	Rincon International Film Festival (Puerto Rico)	Best International Feature	Stolen	Winner
2010	Rivers Edge International Film Festival (United States)	Best Film	Stolen	Winner
2010	Documentary Edge Film Festival (New Zealand)	Best Documentary	Stolen	Special Jury Mention
2010	Documentary Edge Film Festival (New Zealand)	Best Editing	Stolen	Winner
2010	Xv International Tv Festival Bar (Montenegro)	Silver Olive	Stolen	Winner
2010	Ojai Film Festival (United States)	Best Documentary	Stolen	Special Jury Mention
2010	One World Human Rights Film Festival (Bratislava)	Audience Award	Stolen	Winner
2010	It's All True Film Festival (Brazil)	Best International Documentary	Stolen	Nominated
2009	Sydney Film Festival	Best Documentary	Stolen	Nominated
