= Family Entertainment and Copyright Act =

U.S. federal law pertaining to copyright

- Long title: An act to provide for the protection of intellectual property rights, and for other purposes.
- Enacted by: the 109th United States Congress

Citations
- Public law: Pub. L. 109–9 (text) (PDF)
- Statutes at Large: 119 Stat. 218

Codification
- Acts amended: Copyright Act of 1976
- Titles amended: 2, 17, 18, 28, 36
- U.S.C. sections created: 18 U.S.C. § 2319B
- U.S.C. sections amended: 2 U.S.C. § 179 note, § 179m, § 179n, § 179q, § 179w; 17 U.S.C. § 101, § 108, § 110, § 408, § 411, § 412, § 506; 18 U.S.C. § 2319; 28 U.S.C. § 994 note; 36 U.S.C. § 101 note, § 151703, § 151705, § 151711.

Legislative history
- Introduced in the Senate as S.167 by Orrin Hatch (R–UT) on January 25, 2005; Committee consideration by Senate Committee on the Judiciary; House Committee on Judiciary (H. Rept. 109-33); Passed the Senate on February 1, 2005 (Unanimous consent); Passed the House on April 19, 2005 (Voice vote); Signed into law by President George W. Bush on April 27, 2005

The Family Entertainment and Copyright Act, Pub. L. 109–9, 119 Stat. 218 (April 27, 2005), is a federal legislative act regarding copyright that became law in the United States in 2005. The Act consists of two titles or subparts: Title I is called the Artist's Rights and Theft Prevention Act of 2005, which increases penalties for copyright infringement, and Title II is called the Family Movie Act of 2005, which permits the development of technology to "sanitize" potentially offensive DVD and VOD content.

The Family Entertainment and Copyright Act was introduced into the United States Senate (of the 109th United States Congress) on January 25, 2005, by Senator Orrin Hatch (R - Utah), and was signed into law by President George W. Bush on April 27, 2005.

The act provides theater owners and employees with both civil and criminal immunity for questioning suspected violators or detaining them while police are summoned.

== Artist's Rights and Theft Prevention (ART) Act of 2005 ==
This act, also known as the "ART Act", is targeted at preventing copyright infringement of movies and software. It specifically targets two activities: filming movies in a movie theater, and early release of movies and software before they become publicly available.

It permits preregistration of certain types of unpublished works if it determines that such works have a history of infringement prior to commercial distribution. The purpose of preregistration is related to potential litigation protection as it allows an infringement action to be brought before the authorized commercial distribution of a work and the work's full-fledged registration. Preregistration makes possible—only upon full registration—for the copyright owner to receive statutory damages and attorneys’ fees in an infringement action. Works determined eligible for copyright preregistration are: motion pictures, sound recordings, musical compositions, literary works being prepared as books, computer programs (including videogames), and advertising or marketing photographs.

Anyone who "knowingly uses or attempts to use an audiovisual recording device to transmit or make a copy of a ... protected work... from a performance of such work in a motion picture exhibition facility..." may be imprisoned up to three years for a first time offender, and up to six years for a repeat offender, in addition to any fines that may be levied under the U.S. Criminal Code for copyright infringement. This could apply to merely taking a cell phone snapshot of a theatre screen.

With regard to unreleased works intended for public distribution (e.g., beta software or workprints), anyone who makes available a work that the copyright owner expects to distribute commercially, but is not yet distributed, shall be punished if the work is "made available on a computer network accessible to members of the public, if such person knew or should have known that the work was intended for commercial distribution." First time offenders can get up to three years in jail, or five if they committed the offense for financial gain. Repeat offenders can get ten years if the offense was committed for financial gain. These penalties are in addition to any penalties for violating non-disclosure agreements or trade secret law.

== Family Movie Act of 2005 ==
This section is an exemption of liability allowing the creation of technology that can edit a DVD or transmitted movie on the fly (during playback) and thus present a censored version of that movie. This provision arose out of a lawsuit between ClearPlay, a Salt Lake City-based company that markets DVD-sanitizing technology, and a number of Hollywood studios and directors. The ClearPlay technology allows a home consumer to screen out up to 14 different categories of objectionable content, such as drug use, sexual situations, or foul language. The act is codified in 17 U.S.C. 110(11)

== See also ==
- ClearPlay
- VidAngel
