= CleanFlicks =

Latter-day Saint film sanitization company

CleanFlicks (or CleanFlix) was a Latter-day Saint company founded in Utah in 2000 that rented and sold commercially-released DVDs and VHS tapes from which they had edited content which the company considered inappropriate for children or that viewers might otherwise find offensive. CleanFlicks removed sexual content, profanity, some references to deity, and some violence from movies, either by muting audio or clipping entire portions of the track.

A group of major film productions studios sued CleanFlicks in 2002, arguing that their service constituted copyright infringement. A 2006 court ruling closed the company. On March 13, 2007, CleanFlicks reopened its website with "Movies You Can Trust." While legally enjoined from offering edited movies, an email sent by the company on that date indicated that they had reviewed "tens of thousands" of movies and compiled over 1000 that meet their "family-friendly criteria" for sale and rent. As of March 2026, the CleanFlicks.com website is no longer online but is accessible through archives.

== Directors Guild lawsuit ==
An announcement (August 20, 2002) of intention on the Directors Guild of America (DGA) website (on behalf of the guild and 12 directors) to sue seven entities that engage in the video-editing practice, caused CleanFlicks to preemptively file a lawsuit in Denver Federal Court in August 2002. Robert Huntsman, an attorney and inventor affiliated with Cleanflicks who had a DVD-editing patent pending, was named as the lead plaintiff, so the original short caption for the case was Huntsman v. Soderbergh. Robert Huntsman had been advising Corey Smitheram, former operator of four Idaho and Colorado Cleanflicks franchises, In their suit, Cleanflicks sought a judgment stating that edited content was legal under federal copyright law. In addition to director Steven Soderbergh, named defendants included Hollywood figures Steven Spielberg, Robert Redford, Sydney Pollack, Robert Altman, John Landis, and Martin Scorsese. Although the chain had been operating for two years, the issue was brought to the spotlight when MovieMask made a series of demonstrations around Hollywood in March of that year. The directors' counter-suit soon followed, but the legal battle stretched on for years.

CleanFlicks and Huntsman preemptively filed suit against the DGA on August 29, naming 16 renowned directors as defendants in U.S. District Court for the district of Colorado, seeking the Court's determination as to whether their editing practices are protected under federal copyright law. Also, the preemptive filing ensured the impending legal battle would play out in Colorado courts rather than in California.

As the case made national headlines, its short byline read "Huntsman v. Soderbergh". The docket header read:

ROBERT HUNTSMAN and CLEAN FLICKS OF COLORADO, L.L.C.,

Plaintiffs,
v.

STEVEN SODERBERGH, ROBERT ALTMAN, MICHAEL APTED, TAYLOR HACKFORD, CURTIS HANSON, NORMAN JEWISON, JOHN LANDIS, MICHAEL MANN, PHILLIP NOYCE, BRAD SILBERLING, BETTY THOMAS, IRWIN WINKLER, MARTIN SCORSESE, STEVEN SPIELBERG, ROBERT REDFORD and SYDNEY POLLACK

On July 6, 2006, a federal judge in Denver ruled that CleanFlicks' editing violated U.S. copyright laws. The judge ordered the company to "stop producing, manufacturing, creating, and renting" edited movies, and to hand all inventory to movie studios within five days of the ruling. The court gave the company more time than the ruling's initial five-day deadline for turning over the stock of edited movies, since CleanFlicks needed more time to receive movies which were still out on rental.

CleanFlicks had planned to appeal the ruling, but informed its customers by email on July 28, 2006:

It is with great regret that we write to inform you that CleanFlicks is going out of business soon. As you may have heard or read, after three long years of legal struggles, a judge in Colorado has ruled that we cannot sell or rent edited DVDs anymore. While we thought very strongly about appealing the decision, the potential costs and risks to the company, its customers and shareholders was just too great. Accordingly, we have agreed to close our doors after a brief winding-up period.

...We want to offer our sincerest apologies for not being able to provide you with edited DVDs...We appreciate your support of our efforts to provide high-quality, family-friendly movies, and we will try to make this difficult process of closing our operations as painless as we can for all our loyal customers.

The decision not to appeal the ruling became primarily a financial one. Having won the initial court battle, the directors and studios were in a position to collect significant damages for copyright infringement from the editing companies. Although the companies would almost certainly receive a stay of judgment pending appeals, the risk was much higher now. Since the inventory of edited movies had no value to the studios, a deal was offered whereby the companies would be allowed to sell off all of their inventory and keep the profits if they agreed not to appeal the ruling and the studios would not pursue damage claims. Thus, the companies, and their investors, would collect further revenue and be protected from damages and the studios would have a significant court ruling stand and the legal precedent would be set. After discussions with their legal teams and investors, the decision was made to accept the offer. The companies were then given additional time to clear out their inventory but no more films could be edited during that time. All unsold inventory was then sent to the studios as defined by the ruling.

CleanFlicks discontinued offering edited movies on August 31, 2006.

== Robert Huntsman ==
Robert Huntsman (born March 9, 1955, Idaho Falls, Idaho) is an American copyright attorney, engineer, and inventor. He first entered the national spotlight for his association with CleanFlicks during their legal battle with the Directors Guild of America. Huntsman continues practicing law as principal of a small firm located in Boise, Idaho. He operates a litigation practice that includes a Federal Court litigation practice, an Idaho State Court litigation practice, and a Public Interest litigation practice. Huntsman is also a registered patent attorney, licensed to prepare and prosecute patent applications before the U.S. Patent and Trademark Office. A former Hewlett-Packard software engineer, his website claims Huntsman to be one of few patent attorneys with significant software development experience.

Huntsman had registered the domain "qq.com" as early as 1995, which was sold to Asian internet giant Tencent whose primary product is the online messaging service known simply as "QQ".

== Relaunch ==
In March 2007, CleanFlicks announced by email to former customers that they were relaunching their rental services based on a new business model. Earlier in 2007, CleanFlicks had explored by email to, and online polling of, former customers the possibility of relaunching based on an unedited movie-rental business model. As a result, rather than renting content-edited DVDs, CleanFlicks now offers DVD releases of unedited modern and classic movies.

CleanFlicks' inventory now contains "ONLY Movies You Can Trust". Movies rented from the company "will contain no nudity, no graphic violence, and no sexual content."

Former customers' accounts have been retained in the CleanFlicks database, allowing those customers as well as the general public to resume their patronage of CleanFlicks using a "movies-out-at-a-time" tiered structure as before.

== See also ==
- Clean Films
- ClearPlay
- Re-edited film
- Cleanflix
