= The Phantom Edit =

2000 film

The VHS cover

Star Wars Episode I.II: The Phantom Edit is a fan edit of the film Star Wars: Episode I – The Phantom Menace, removing many elements of the original film. The purpose of the edit, according to creator Mike J. Nichols, was to make a much stronger version of The Phantom Menace based on the previous execution and philosophies of film storytelling and editing of George Lucas. The Phantom Edit was the first unauthorized re-edit of The Phantom Menace to receive major publicity and acclaim and is also considered the first fan-edit of a feature film ever to be shared by an online audience.

== History ==
The Phantom Edit was originally circulated in Hollywood studios in 2000 and 2001, and was followed by media attention. Salon.com, NPR, PBS, and the BBC all covered the edit to various degrees.

Rumor initially attributed The Phantom Edit to Kevin Smith, who admitted to having seen the re-edit but denied that he was the editor. The editor was revealed to be Mike J. Nichols of Santa Clarita, California, in the September 7, 2001, edition of The Washington Post.

Lucasfilm, the production company of series creator George Lucas, condoned the edit and did not pursue legal action against its distributors.

== Reviews ==
Critics and filmmakers have commented on the original Phantom Edit, in most cases providing the approval and recognition which furthered the fan edit movement.

- "Smart editing to say the least" — Kevin Smith, film director
- "...Materialized from out of nowhere was a good film that had been hidden inside the disappointing original one." — Daniel Kraus, Salon
- "[Done by]; someone with a gift (and equipment) for editing" — Michael Wilmington, Chicago Tribune film critic
