= ClearPlay =

Streaming movie parental control service

ClearPlay is a parental control service that allows content filtering of streaming movies available on Disney+, Amazon Prime, HBOMax, Apple TV+ and Netflix. It automatically skips over or mutes undesirable content such as profanity, graphic violence, nudity, drug and adult-oriented content based on a customer's filter settings.

== How it works ==
When watching a movie with ClearPlay parental controls the user can select which types of content to omit from the streaming presentation. The presentation includes data indicating to the player where possibly unwanted content is located, often to the exact frame. This allows the player to skip or mute offensive or undesirable content during playback of the stream. The choice is also made available to watch the film in its unedited form, by turning the filtering off.

ClearPlay allows users to choose specific types of possibly offensive, questionable, or otherwise undesirable content to censor. There are twelve categories of content that can be filtered and four different levels (none, implied, explicit and graphic). These categories include: Violence, Sex, Nudity and Vulgarity. Users will see a list prior to the beginning of the feature of possibly questionable content that will not be removed depending on the movie, scene and/or situation.

USA Today describes ClearPlay as follows:

Users choose what content to filter in each movie, via an on-screen menu — "violence, sex and nudity" and "language" — and further customize the category. For example, in "language," viewers can choose to allow "crude language and humor" but filter out "strong profanity," "graphic vulgarity," "ethnic and social slurs" and "vain reference to deity." In all, filtering options offer up to 16,000 combinations.

The methods of removing content also depends on the scenes and user settings. Users can select which scenes and language to filter. In some cases, the scene might be removed entirely, depending on the user settings and/or the discretion of the filter editors. The company also accepts feedback if people, for example, have suggestions on edited scenes, and/or disagreements with a particular edit.

== Legal actions ==
The United States Congress passed the Family Entertainment and Copyright Act that explicitly clarified the copyright laws explaining that someone can personalize the playback of movies, skipping or muting content from playback of video on demand or DVDs. The proposed Freedom and Innovation Revitalizing United States Entrepreneurship Act of 2007 (FAIR USE Act) would have provided exceptions to the Digital Millennium Copyright Act to allow circumvention of digital rights management by hardware or software that skips objectionable content. The FAIR USE Act did not become law.

== See also ==
- Re-edited film
- Canadian Home Video Rating System
- CleanFlicks
- Content-control software
- Lewis Galoob Toys, Inc. v. Nintendo of America, Inc.
- Motion picture rating system
- Parental Advisory
- Edit Decision List
