= 29th Genie Awards =

2009 Canadian film awards ceremony

- Date: April 4, 2009
- Site: Canada Aviation Museum; Ottawa, Ontario
- Hosted by: Dave Foley

Highlights
- Best Picture: Passchendaele
- Most awards: Passchendaele (5)
- Most nominations: The Necessities of Life (Ce qu'il faut pour vivre) (8)

Television coverage
- Network: Global, IFC

The 29th Genie Awards were held on April 4, 2009, to honour Canadian films released in 2008. The ceremony was held at the Canada Aviation Museum in Ottawa, Ontario, and was broadcast on Global and IFC. The ceremony was hosted by Dave Foley.

Nominations were announced on February 10, 2009, and were led by Quebec films. The Necessities of Life (French: Ce qu'il faut pour vivre) received eight nominations followed by Everything Is Fine (French: Tout est parfait) with seven. Historical epic Passchendaele had the most wins at five Genies and was also recognized with the Golden Reel as the highest-grossing Canadian film.

== Host city and venue ==
The 29th Genie Awards were held in Ottawa, Canada's capital, in a move suggested by the National Capital Commission (NCC). The awards had previously only been held in Toronto, aside from two ceremonies in Montreal in the mid-1990s. The Ontario provincial government invested $150,000 to help the NCC host the Genie Awards and Genie Week, to bring national attention to tourist attractions in the capital region.

The venue chosen for the awards ceremony was the Canada Aviation Museum (now the Canada Aviation and Space Museum). Gordon Pinsent and Caroline Neron announced the nominations at the museum on February 10, 2009. On March 30, Dave Foley was named to host the ceremony.

== Genie Week ==
A new feature of this year's awards was Genie Week of 20 events over 8 days, leading up to the awards ceremony on April 4. Events were arranged by the Genie Host Organizing Committee, the NCC and the Academy of Canadian Cinema & Television (ACCT).

The Canadian War Museum presented a free screening of Passchendaele, followed by a question and answer session and a tour of trench warfare exhibits. The Canada Aviation Museum was transformed into a drive-in theatre for a screening of Amal. Screenings of other best-picture nominees were held at Centrepointe Theatre, Arts Court, the Canadian Museum of Civilization, and the Canadian Museum of Nature, along with talks and cultural events.

Library and Archives Canada (LAC) hosted lunchtime screenings of Best Animated Short and Best Live Action Short nominees throughout the week, and offered tours of its film preservation centre and extensive film collections.

Specially designated Via Rail Genie trains brought nominees, industry members and special guests from Toronto and Montreal, with a red carpet reception on their arrival in Ottawa on April 3.

== Ceremony ==
While lacking the extravagance of the Toronto events, the Ottawa ceremony was considered a smart and stylish event. Guy Buller, president of ACTRA's Ottawa chapter, wrote that the museum's collection of vintage aircraft lent a sense of "history, endeavour and pride" to the ceremony.

The awards ceremony was followed by a gala at the Canadian War Museum.

On the red carpet, one presenter suggested that they had dressed down in response to Prime Minister Stephen Harper's election comment that his constituents didn't care about fancy art galas.

=== Advocacy ===
The venue was located minutes from Parliament Hill, and there were calls from presenters and other celebrities for Harper's Conservative government to increase support for Canadian film and other cultural industries, particularly for the Canadian Broadcasting Corporation (CBC). On the red carpet, Foley advocated that Canadian theatres be required to show a proportion of domestic films, as is the case in France and Great Britain.

Presenter Wendy Crewson joked that the after party would be held at the Prime Minister's residence, where she would be on a barricade with a bullhorn.

Heritage Minister James Moore received an invitation but declined to attend. A writer for The Globe and Mail noted no Conservative politicians at the event, though Liberal MPs Pablo Rodríguez and Martha Hall Findlay were at the ceremony. Rodriguez was a vocal critic of Heritage policy.

Jay Stone of The National Post wrote that Kristin Booth's supporting actress win was a "vindication" for Young People Fucking, a film which was at the centre of the Bill C-10 controversy of the previous year. During the previous year's ceremony, several speakers had criticized the bill.

== Awards ==
Winners are listed first and highlighted in boldface:

Motion Picture	Direction
**Passchendaele — Niv Fichman, Francis Damberger, Paul Gross, Frank Siracusa**; Amal — David Miller, Steven Bray; The Necessities of Life (Ce qu'il faut pour vivre) — Bernadette Payeur, René Chénier; Normal — Andrew Boutilier, Carl Bessai; Everything Is Fine (Tout est parfait) — Nicole Robert	**Benoît Pilon, The Necessities of Life (Ce qu'il faut pour vivre)**; Carl Bessai, Normal; Lyne Charlebois, Borderline; Yves-Christian Fournier, Everything Is Fine (Tout est parfait); Richie Mehta, Amal
Actor in a leading role	Actress in a leading role
**Natar Ungalaaq, The Necessities of Life (Ce qu'il faut pour vivre)**; Paul Gross, Passchendaele; Rupinder Nagra, Amal; Christopher Plummer, Emotional Arithmetic; Aaron Poole, This Beautiful City	**Ellen Burstyn, The Stone Angel**; Isabelle Blais, Borderline; Marianne Fortier, Mommy Is at the Hairdresser's (Maman est chez le coiffeur); Susan Sarandon, Emotional Arithmetic; Preity Zinta, Heaven on Earth
Actor in a supporting role	Actress in a supporting role
**Callum Keith Rennie, Normal**; Normand D'Amour, Everything Is Fine (Tout est parfait); Benoît McGinnis, Le Banquet; Rade Šerbedžija, Fugitive Pieces; Max von Sydow, Emotional Arithmetic	**Kristin Booth, Young People Fucking**; Céline Bonnier, Mommy Is at the Hairdresser's (Maman est chez le coiffeur); Éveline Gélinas, The Necessities of Life (Ce qu'il faut pour vivre); Anie Pascale, Everything Is Fine (Tout est parfait); Rosamund Pike, Fugitive Pieces
Original Screenplay	Adapted Screenplay
**Bernard Émond, The Necessities of Life (Ce qu'il faut pour vivre)**; Randall Cole, Real Time; Travis McDonald, Normal; Deepa Mehta, Heaven on Earth; Guillaume Vigneault, Everything Is Fine (Tout est parfait)	**Marie-Sissi Labrèche and Lyne Charlebois, Borderline**; Richie Mehta and Shaun Mehta, Amal; Jeremy Podeswa, Fugitive Pieces
Best Live Action Short Drama	Best Animated Short
**Next Floor — Denis Villeneuve, Phoebe Greenberg**; The Answer Key — Samir Rehem, Robin Crumley; Beyond the Walls (La Battue) — Guy Édoin, Pascal Bascaron, Sylvain Corbeil; Can You Wave Bye-Bye? — Sarah Galea-Davis, Paul Barbeau; My Name Is Victor Gazon (Mon nom est Victor Gazon) — Patrick Gazé, Antonello Cozzolino, Marie-Josée Laroque, Annie Normandin	**Sleeping Betty — Claude Cloutier, Marcel Jean**; Drux Flux — Theodore Ushev, Marc Bertrand; The Facts in the Case of Mister Hollow — Rodrigo Gudiño, Vincent Marcone, Marco Pecota
Art Direction/Production Design	Cinematography
**Carol Spier and Janice Blackie-Goodine, Passchendaele**; Patrice Bengle, Mommy Is at the Hairdresser's (Maman est chez le coiffeur); Matthew Davies and Erica Milo, Fugitive Pieces; Rob Gray, The Stone Angel; Danielle Labrie, The American Trap (Le Piège américain)	**Gregory Middleton, Fugitive Pieces**; Nicolas Bolduc, Le Banquet; Bobby Bukowski, The Stone Angel; Pierre Gill, The American Trap (Le Piège américain); Sara Mishara, Everything Is Fine (Tout est parfait)
Costume Design	Editing
**Wendy Partridge, Passchendaele**; Francesca Chamberland, The Necessities of Life (Ce qu'il faut pour vivre); Marie-Geneviève Cyr, Who Is KK Downey?; Michèle Hamel, Mommy Is at the Hairdresser's (Maman est chez le coiffeur); Michèle Hamel, The American Trap (Le Piège américain)	**Richard Comeau, The Necessities of Life (Ce qu'il faut pour vivre)**; Frédérique Broos, It's Not Me, I Swear! (C'est pas moi, je le jure!); Dominique Fortin, Mommy Is at the Hairdresser's (Maman est chez le coiffeur); Dominique Fortin and Carina Baccanale, Le Banquet; Yvann Thibaudeau, Borderline
Overall Sound	Sound Editing
**Lou Solakofski, Garrell Clark and Steve Foster, Passchendaele**; Sanjay Mehta, Stephan Carrier and Kirk Lynds, Amal; Mario Auclair, Luc Boudrias and François Senneville, Le Banquet; Claude La Haye, Daniel Bisson, Luc Boudrias and Patrick Lalonde, The American Trap (Le Piège américain); David Ottier and Daniel Prado Villar, This Beautiful City	**Jane Tattersall, Kevin Banks, Barry Gilmore, Andy Malcolm and David Rose, Passchendaele**; Robert LaBrosse, France Lévesque, Guy Francoeur, Lucie Fortier and Lori Paquet, The Broken Line (La ligne brisée); François B. Senneville, Antoine Morin and Carole Gagnon, Le Banquet; Jean-François Sauvé, Natalie Fleurant, Jérôme Décarie and Claude Beaugrand, The American Trap (Le Piège américain); Nelson Ferreira, Lee de Lang and Nathan Robitaille, This Beautiful City
Achievement in Music: Original Score	Achievement in Music: Original Song
**John McCarthy, The Stone Angel**; Normand Corbeil, Emotional Arithmetic; Laurent Eyquem, Mommy Is at the Hairdresser's (Maman est chez le coiffeur); Nikos Kypourgos, Fugitive Pieces; Robert M. Lepage, The Necessities of Life (Ce qu'il faut pour vivre)	**Dr. Shiva, "Rahi Nagufta" — Amal**; Loco Locass, "M'Accrocher?" — Everything Is Fine (Tout est parfait); Bry Webb, "Big Smoke" — This Beautiful City
Documentary	Special awards
**Up the Yangtze — Yung Chang, Mila Aung-Thwin, John Christou, Germaine Ying-Gee Wong**; Forever Quebec (Infiniment Québec) — Jean-Claude Labrecque, Yves Fortin, Christian Medawar; My Winnipeg — Guy Maddin, Phyllis Laing, Jody Shapiro	Achievement in Make-Up: Adrien Morot, Réjean Goderre, Marie-France Guy, Bruno Gatien and Nathalie Trépanier, Cruising Bar 2; Claude Jutra Award: Yves-Christian Fournier, Everything Is Fine (Tout est parfait); Golden Reel Award: Passchendaele

== Telecast ==
The awards were broadcast on Global and IFC on April 4 at 9 pm (ET). The broadcast was lengthened to ninety minutes, compared to the previous year's one-hour show.
