= Percy Jackson: Sea of Monsters (soundtrack) =

Percy Jackson: Sea of Monsters (Original Motion Picture Soundtrack)

Soundtrack album by Andrew Lockington
- Released: August 6, 2013
- Recorded: 2013
- Genre: Soundtrack
- Length: 1:08:54
- Label: Sony Classical
- Producers: Andrew Lockington; Brian Liesegang

Andrew Lockington chronology
I'll Follow You Down (2012)	Percy Jackson: Sea of Monsters (2013)	Siddharth (2013)

Percy Jackson: Sea of Monsters (Original Motion Picture Soundtrack) is the score album to the 2013 film Percy Jackson: Sea of Monsters. The second instalment of the Percy Jackson film series and the 2010 film Percy Jackson & the Olympians: The Lightning Thief, it is loosely based on the 2006 novel The Sea of Monsters from Rick Riordan's fantasy adventure novel series Percy Jackson & the Olympians. The film features a musical score composed by Andrew Lockington, replacing Christophe Beck from the first film. The score album was released by Sony Classical Records on August 6, 2013.

== Background ==
The film's score was composed by Andrew Lockington, with additional music produced by Tiff Randol and Nicholas Dodd. The album was compiled and produced by Brian Liesegang. It was recorded at the Newman Scoring Stage in 20th Century Fox Studios, with Dodd conducting the Hollywood Studio Symphony orchestra, consisting of 70-members handling instrumental pieces, and a 40-member vocal choir. The score mixing was done in mid-July, supervised by Brad Haehnel, mixing the score in surround sound.

In addition to Lockington's score, an original song titled "To Feel Alive" was recorded by IAMEVE, and included in the film's closing credits. She was the lead vocalist for the film score, and while recording "Thalia's Story", which was integrated throughout the film, she planned to incorporate the theme into a song. She further said "Thor had said that he wanted a really strong hook and for it to be uplifting, so I played the chord changes on piano and sang ideas until it felt pretty strong and then I sent it over to Andrew, who tweaked and sent back. Since the chorus was so big, we wanted the verse to be much darker and the pre-chorus to give a nice lift into the chorus. Lyrically I did a lot of research on Thalia's character and traditional mythology for inspiration. Ultimately for the lyrics and melody, the main intention for me was to stay connected to Thalia's story and continue using the song as a way to give her a voice. Arrangement wise, we focused on connecting the sound of IAMEVE with the film orchestration and giving it a real cinematic quality." She recorded the vocals for the song in her home studio, unlike what she did to the score.

== Reception ==
James Southall of Movie Wave wrote "Sea of Monsters is very much in the same sort of style – and is even more bland. What we have here is a thematic, primarily orchestral action/adventure score, composed and performed with enthusiasm. The music goes in one ear and out the other – nothing sticks. It's such a shame because I'm delighted to see a score in this style be attached to a (reasonably) high-profile summer movie; but I really can't bring myself to like it. There's action and adventure music here but I can't tell you about any of that either, because as soon as it's over, I can't remember a thing about it. Loads of people raved about Journey 2; if you were one of them, you'll almost certainly love Sea of Monsters as well."

For his musical work, Lockington won the BMI Film Music Award, as well as the SOCAN Award for International Film Music. It was one of the 114 eligible contenders to be nominated for Academy Award for Best Original Score at the 86th Academy Awards.

== Track listing ==
No.	Title	Length
1.	"Thalia's Story"	3:42
2.	"Percy at the Lake"	1:29
3.	"Colchis Bull"	4:08
4.	"The Shield is Gone"	1:31
5.	"The Oracle's Prophecy"	3:08
6.	"Cursed Blade Shall Reap"	1:43
7.	"Wild Taxi Ride"	3:25
8.	"Hermes"	2:34
9.	"Hippocampus"	3:34
10.	"Onboard the Yacht"	1:39
11.	"Wave Conjuring"	6:49
12.	"Sea of Monsters"	2:31
13.	"Belly of the Beast"	3:52
14.	"New Coordinates"	2:13
15.	"Polyphemus"	2:58
16.	"Thank You Brother"	6:01
17.	"Kronos"	5:08
18.	"Annabeth and the Fleece"	2:03
19.	"Resurrection"	3:04
20.	"Percy Jackson: Sea of Monsters – Main Titles"	3:15
21.	"To Feel Alive" (performed by IAMEVE)	4:06

== Additional music ==
"My Songs Know What You Did in the Dark (Light Em Up)" by Fall Out Boy and "Cameo Lover" by Kimbra were featured in the film, but not included in the soundtrack. Waltz in A Flat Major, Op.39, No.15 by Johannes Brahms and Sherman Brothers' "It's a Small World" were also played in the film.

== Personnel ==
Credits adapted from CD liner notes

Production

- Composer – Andrew Lockington
- Additional music – Tiff Randol, Nicholas Dodd
- Producer – Brian Liesegang
- Recording – Erik Swanson, Tim Lauber
- Mixing – Brad Haehnel
- Mastering – Pat Sullivan
- Editing – Will Kaplan
- Musical assistance – Neil Parfitt, John Aspinall
- Music supervisor – Julia Michels
- Score contractor – Peter Rotter
- Music preparation – JoAnn Kane Music Service, Mark Graham

Instruments

- Bass – Bruce Morgenthaler, Christian Kollgaard, David Parmeter, Drew D. Dembowski, Michael Valerio, Nico Carmine Abondolo, Stephen Dress, Edward Meares
- Bassoon – Kenneth Munday, Rose Corrigan
- Cello – Andrew T. Shulman, Armen Ksajikian, Cecilia Tsan, Christina Soule, Dane Little, Dennis Karazmyn, Eric Byers, Erika Duke-Kirkpatrick, George Kim Scholes, Giovanna Clayton, Laszlo Mezo, Paula Hochhalter, Timothy Landauer, Timothy E. Loo, Trevor Handy, Vanessa P. Freebairn-Smith*, Xiaodan Zheng, Steve Erdody
- Clarinet – Ralph Williams, Gary S. Bovyer
- Flute – Heather Clark, Geraldine Rotella
- Guitar – Tim Welch
- Harp – Katie Kirkpatrick
- Horn – Benjamin Jaber, Daniel P. Kelley, Jenny L. Kim, Mark L. Adams, Steven Becknell, David Everson
- Hurdy Gurdy – Ben Grossman
- Oboe – Bernadette Avila, Lara K. Wickes, Leslie H. Reed
- Percussion – Alan Estes, Edward J. Atkatz, Gregory Goodall, John Wakefield, Joseph Pereira, Russell Miller, Steven Schaeffer, William Quinn Smith, Wade Culbreath
- Piano – Randy Kerber
- Synth – Michael White, Neil Parfitt
- Tenor Vocals – AJ Teshin, Fletcher Sheridan, George Sterne, Gerald White, Jasper Randall, Michael Lichtenauer, Shawn Kirchner, Steven Harms, Timothy Gonzales, Todd Strange
- Trombone – William F. Reichenbach, Phillip M. Keen, Steven M. Holtman, Alexander Iles
- Trumpet – Barry Perkins, Rick Baptist, Robert Frear, Robert A. Schaer, Jon Lewis
- Tuba – Doug Tornquist
- Viola – Alma L. Fernandez, Andrew Duckles, Darrin McCann, David F. Walther, Jennie Hansen, Luke A. Maurer, Matthew Funes, Meredith Crawford, Pamela Jacobson, Robert A. Brophy, Roland Kato, Shawn Mann, Thomas Diener, Victoria Miskolczy, Brian Dembow
- Violin – Aimee Kreston, Alyssa Park, Amy Hershberger, Andrew Bulbrook, Benjamin Jacobson, Charlie Bisharat, Darius Campo, Eun-Mee Ahn, Grace E. Oh, Helen Nightengale, Irina Voloshina, Jay Rosen, Jessica E. Guideri, Josefina Vergara, Julie Rogers, Katia Popov, Kevin Connolly, Lisa Liu, Lisa M. Sutton, Lorand Lokuszta, Lorenz Gamma, Marc Sazer, Natalie Leggett, Neil E. Samples, Paul J. Cartwright, Phillip Levy, Radu Pieptea, Rafael Rishik, Richard L. Altenbach*, Roberto Cani, Roger Wilkie, Sara Parkins, Sarah Thornblade, Serena McKinney, Shalini Vijayan, Songa Lee, Tamara Hatwan, Tereza L. Stanislav, Julie Ann Gigante

Vocals

- Alto – Adriana Manfredi, Aleta Braxton, Amy Fogerson, Ember Vaughan, Jessica Rotter, Kimberly Switzer, Kristen Toedtman, Michele Hemmings, Nancy Sulahian, Nike St. Clair
- Bass – Abdiel Gonzalez, Alvin Chea, Dylan Gentile, Ed Levy, Gregg Geiger, Michael Geiger, Reid Bruton, Scott Graff, Steve Pence, Will Goldman
- Soprano – Claire Fedoruk, Elin Carlson, Elissa Johnston, Harriet Fraser, Hayden Eberhart, Holly Sedillos, Jennifer Haydn-Jones, Karen Hogle Brown, Lesley Leighton, Suzanne Waters
- Solo vocals – Tiff Randol

Orchestra

- Concertmaster – Bruce Dukov
- Orchestrator – Nicholas Dodd
- Orchestra conductor – Nicholas Dodd
- Choir contractor – Jasper Randall
- Stage engineer – Denis St. Amand
- Stage manager – Damon Tedesco, David Marquette, Tom Steel

Management

- Business Affairs – Tom Cavanaugh
- Music clearance – Ellen Ginsburg
- Licensing – Mark Cavell
- Executive in charge of music – Danielle Diego
- Music production supervisor – Rebecca Morellato
- Product manager – Klara Korytowska
- Design – WLP Ltd.

== See also ==
- Music of Percy Jackson and the Olympians
