= The Lightning Thief (disambiguation) =

The Lightning Thief is the 2005 first novel in the Percy Jackson & The Olympians book series by Rick Riordan

The Lightning Thief may also refer to:

- The Lightning Thief (musical), 2014 musical based on The Lightning Thief book
- Percy Jackson & the Olympians: The Lightning Thief, 2010 movie based on The Lightning Thief book
- Percy Jackson & the Olympians: The Lightning Thief (soundtrack), 2010 film score for the movie
- "The Lightning Thief", fifteenth track from Percy Jackson and the Olympians (Original Soundtrack) in the Percy Jackson and the Olympians television series

== See also ==
- Percy Jackson (disambiguation)
