= Sivanandan =

Sivanandan சிவானந்தன்
- Romanisation: Civāṉantaṉ
- Gender: Male
- Language: Tamil

Origin
- Region of origin: Southern India; North-eastern Sri Lanka

Other names
- Alternative spelling: Sivanandhan; Sivananthan

Sivanandan (Tamil: சிவானந்தன், romanized: Civāṉantaṉ) is a Tamil male given name. Due to the Tamil tradition of using patronymic surnames, it may also be a surname for males and females.

== Notable people ==
- Ambalavaner Sivanandan (1923–2018), Sri Lankan activist
- Bodhana Sivanandan (born 2015), British chess player
- Dhanushkodi Sivanandan, Indian police officer
- Nedumangad Sivanandan (born 1935), Indian violinist
- Siva Sivananthan, American academic
- Dr. Shiva, stage name of Ramier Siva-Nandan, Indo-Canadian musician and actor
