= Shaun Mehta =

Canadian writer

Shaun Mehta is a Canadian writer. He has published one novel and one short story collection, and also collaborated with his brother, film director Richie Mehta, on the screenplay for Richie's debut film Amal, which was based on one of Shaun's short stories. Amal has won over 30 international awards.

Shaun and Richie Mehta were nominated for Best Adapted Screenplay at the 29th Genie Awards.

== Works ==
=== Novels ===
- Divya's Dharma (2004)
- The Seven Vows (2017)

=== Trilogy ===
- Illuminated Shadows (2014 - 2016)

=== Short stories ===
- A Slice of Life (2005)

=== Children's books ===
- Shiloh's Forever Family (2020)
- Shiloh's Sleepy Time (2021)

=== Screenplays ===
- Amal (2008)

He teaches and writes in Toronto, Canada.

All of Shaun's works are available on Amazon.
