= Percy Jackson & the Olympians: The Lightning Thief (soundtrack) =

Percy Jackson & the Olympians: The Lightning Thief (Original Motion Picture Soundtrack)

Film score by Christophe Beck
- Released: February 5, 2010
- Recorded: 2009–2010
- Genre: Film score
- Length: 59:07
- Label: ABKCO
- Producer: Christophe Beck

Christophe Beck chronology
Waiting for "Superman" (2010)	Percy Jackson & the Olympians: The Lightning Thief (2010)	Hot Tub Time Machine (2010)

Percy Jackson & the Olympians: The Lightning Thief (Original Motion Picture Soundtrack) (Note: also released as Percy Jackson: The Lightning Thief (Original Motion Picture Soundtrack)) is the score album to the 2010 film Percy Jackson & the Olympians: The Lightning Thief. An adaptation of the 2005 novel The Lightning Thief from Rick Riordan's fantasy adventure novel series Percy Jackson & the Olympians, the film is also the first instalment in the Percy Jackson film series. The musical score is composed by Christophe Beck and was released by ABKCO Records digitally on February 5, 2010, followed by a CD release on February 15. The score was positively received by critics and audiences.

== Production ==
Christophe Beck composed the film's musical score, after his previous collaboration with Chris Columbus in I Love You, Beth Cooper (2009). From the onset, Columbus wanted a "traditional" and "symphonic" sound. Hence, Beck produced the score entirely with a traditional orchestra, devoid of electronic and synth music. He added that the co-relations with the characters were done with the help of melodies than instrumentation, where he had used brass music for the gods. Beck applied huge "orchestral music" to complement the action score cues, which was his first in his theatrical career.

== Track listing ==
No.	Title	Length
1.	"Prelude"	2:29
2.	"The Minotaur"	5:09
3.	"Chiron"	2:02
4.	"Victory"	1:32
5.	"The Fury"	2:16
6.	"Dyslexia"	1:02
7.	"The Hydra"	6:54
8.	"Medusa"	2:43
9.	"Son of Poseidon"	1:57
10.	"The Parthenon"	3:42
11.	"Hollywood"	2:32
12.	"Lost Souls"	2:35
13.	"Fighting Luke, Part 1"	3:54
14.	"Fighting Luke, Part 2"	2:47
15.	"Hades"	2:47
16.	"Mount Olympus"	1:27
17.	"Poseidon"	3:07
18.	"Homecoming"	3:06
19.	"End Credits"	7:12

== Reception ==
The score received acclaim from critics, praising Beck's instrumentation and composition. Jonathan Broxton praised the same, saying "Beck's music is classically orchestral, with little to no reliance on any electronic enhancements or synthesized samples, except when required to add a nuance or texture to a certain scene that an orchestra is unable to provide. This acoustic approach is sure to please traditional film music fans." But criticised the album presentation and sequencing. Heather Pheras of AllMusic wrote "Beck brings to bear the full resources of the A-list of Hollywood orchestral musicians here, and they play a highly conventional big orchestral score to accompany the story of a teenager contending with the gods of Mount Olympus. Beck likes to have the many horns carry his alternately heroic and wistful melodies, while the massed strings provide rhythmic underpinning. It's not hard to tell what sorts of activities the musical cues accompany, as titles like "The Fury" indicate that feats of derring-do are being enacted on the big screen while Beck's galloping music fills the theater. He reserves his big main theme, appropriately enough, for a cue called "Hollywood." Indeed, this is Hollywood 101, nothing that hasn't been heard before, just as the film is strongly suggestive of similar sorts of entertainment that have sopped up lots of money from multiplexes in recent years. But it is effectively done all the same."

Filmtracks.com wrote "The Lightning Thief is no doubt an effective score in context. It may sound generic to even casual movie-goers, for its safely harmonic style and conservative instrumentation meet all expectations without exceeding them. Such listeners may also hear everything from Laurence Rosenthal's Clash of the Titans (1981) to John Ottman's Fantastic Four (2005) in this music, not mention fluttering rhythms from Goldsmith's Star Trek: The Motion Picture (1979). But it still serves its purpose and helps you root for Beck, who is one of those composers who has toiled without due recognition for too long." BBC's Michael Quinn called the score that is "packed with incident and colour even if it occasionally smacks of writing-by-numbers", and further added "Beck makes rather thin use of recognisable themes but he has a strong feel for atmosphere and offers a muscular commentary shot through with a sufficiently wide range of tonal colours to maintain interest. To the fore are heroic brass fanfares, lilting woodwinds, dramatically martial percussion, strings that soar and swoop, and clashing metallic effects augmented by electronic accents. It won't disappoint, but it doesn't thrill or excite either." IGN's review about the film score stated "Christophe Beck's score is perfectly mixed into the action, delivering exciting cues."

== Additional music ==
The Lightning Thief featured several songs by popular artists, that were not included in the soundtrack. Some of the songs include:

- "Highway to Hell" – AC/DC
- "I'll Pretend" – Dwight Yoakam
- "A Little Less Conversation (Junkie XL Remix)" – Elvis Presley
- "Poker Face" – Lady Gaga
- "Mama Told Me (Not to Come)" – Three Dog Night
- "Tik Tok" – Kesha
- "Ain't That a Kick in the Head?" – Jimmy Van Heusen and Sammy Cahn

== Personnel ==
Credits adapted from CD liner notes

Production

- Composer – Christophe Beck
- Recording – Noah Snyder, Tim Lauber
- Mixing – Casey Stone
- Mastering – Dave Collins
- Editing – Fernand Bos
- Music supervision – Mike Knobloch
- Music co-ordinator – Rebecca Morellato, Teri Landi
- Score co-ordinator – Jake Monaco
- Music preparation – Joann Kane Music Services, Mark Graham

Instruments

- Bass – Bruce Morgenthaler, Christian Kollgaard, David Parmeter, Drew Dembowski, Edward Meares, Michael Valerio, Nico Carmine Abondolo, Oscar Hidalgo
- Bassoon – Allen Savedoff, Kenneth Munday, Michael O'Donovan
- Cello – Andrew Shulman, Anthony Cooke, Armen Ksajikian, Cecelia Tsan, Dane Little, Dennis Karmazyn, Erika Duke-Kirkpatrick, George Kim Scholes, Steve Erdody, Timothy Landauer*
- Clarinet – Donald Foster, Ralph Williams, Stuart Clark
- Flute – Geraldine Rotella, Heather Clark, James Walker
- Harp – JoAnn Turovsky
- Horn – Brian O'Connor, Daniel Kelley, David Duke, James Thatcher, Jenny Kim, Mark Adams, Richard Todd, Steven Becknell
- Keyboards – Randy Kerber
- Oboe – Chris Bleth, Jonathan Davis, Leslie H. Reed
- Percussion – Alan Estes, Gregory Goodall, Marvin B. Gordy III, Peter Limonick, Steven Schaeffer, Wade Culbreath
- Trombone – Alexander Iles, Andrew Malloy, George Thatcher, Phillip Teele, William Booth
- Trumpet – Barry Perkins, Jon Lewis, Malcolm McNab, Wayne Bergeron
- Tuba – Doug Tornquist
- Viola – Andrew Duckles, Brian Dembow, Darrin McCann, David Walther, Kathryn Reddish, Marlow Fisher, Matthew Funes, Michael Nowak, Robert A. Brophy, Roland Kato, Shawn Mann, Victoria Miskolczy
- Violin – Aimee Kreston, Alyssa Park, Amy Hershberger, Ana Landauer, Anatoly Rosinsky, Bruce Dukov, Darius Campo, Dimitrie Leivici, Endre Granat, Eun-Mee Ahn, Jacqueline Brand, Jeanne Skrocki, Julie Ann Gigante, Katia Popov, Kenneth Yerke, Kevin Connolly, Lisa Sutton, Marc Sazer, Natalie Leggett, Nina Evtuhov, Rafael Rishik, Roberto Cani, Roger Wilkie, Sarah Thornblade, Searmi Park, Serena McKinney, Shalini Vijayan, Tamara Hatwan, Tereza Stanislav, Tiffany Hu

Vocals

- Alto – Aleta Braxton, Alice Kirwan Murray, Amber Erwin, Angie Jaree, Cindy Bourquin, Donna Medine, Drea Pressley, Edie Lehmann Boddicker, Jennifer Barnes, Karen Harper, Kimberly Switzer, Leberta Loral, Michele Hemmings, Nancy Sulahian, Nicole Baker, Niké St. Clair
- Soprano – Claire Fedoruk, Diane Freiman Reynolds, Elin Carlson, Elissa Johnston, Harriet Fraser, Jennifer Graham*, Joanna Bushnell, Karen Whipple Schnurr, Lesley Leighton, Lori Moran, Marie Hodgson, Monique Donnelly, Nikki Hassman, Samela Beasom, Teri Koide, Tyler Azelton
- Tenor – Augie Castagnola, Chris Mann, Chris Gambol, George Sterne, Gerald White, Jasper Randall, Jody Golightly, Jonathan Mack, Michael Lichtenauer, Sean McDermott, Shawn Kirchner, Tim Davis

Orchestra

- Orchestration – Kevin Kliesch, Jake Monaco, Tim Davies
- Orchestra conductor – Tim Davies
- Contractor – Jasper Randall
- Stage engineer – Denis St. Amand
- Stage manager – Dominic Gonzales, Greg Dennen, Tom Steel

Management

- Business affairs (ABKCO) – Peter Howard
- Business affairs (20th Century Fox) – Tom Cavanaugh
- Executive in charge of marketing (ABKCO) – Iris Keitel,
- Executive in charge of music (20th Century Fox) – Robert Kraft
- Executive in charge of sales (ABKCO) – Joe Parker
- Executive in charge of soundtracks (ABKCO) – Alisa Coleman
- Marketing (ABKCO) – Michael Kirk, Tracey Jordan
- Packaging and design – Dale Voelker

== See also ==
- Music of Percy Jackson and the Olympians
