= Do Not Disturb (2022 film) =

2022 film directed by John Ainslie

- Film poster
- Directed by: John Ainslie
- Written by: John Ainslie
- Starring: Kimberly Laferriere; Rogan Christopher
- Production companies: 1984 Pictures; Bunk 11 Pictures; Rechna Varma Productions
- Distributed by: Dark Star Pictures; Uncork'd Entertainment
- Release date: August 19, 2022
- Running time: 92 minutes
- Country: Canada
- Language: English

Do Not Disturb is a 2022 Canadian horror thriller film written and directed by John Ainslie, starring Kimberly Laferriere and Rogan Christopher.

== Premise ==
Chloe and Jack are a recently married couple who go to Miami for their honeymoon. One day at the beach, a man who's high on drugs throws bags of peyote at their feet and walks into the sea, after which things go awry.

== Cast ==
- Kimberly Laferriere as Chloe
- Rogan Christopher as Jack
- Janet Porter as Wendy
- Christian McKenna as Wayne
- Rupinder Nagra as Saj
- Patrick McNeil as Manuel
- Trish Rainone as Homewrecker

== Release ==
Do Not Disturb premiered in the United States on August 19, 2022, at the Popcorn Frights Film Festival, and it was given a limited release in the United States on November 17, 2023.

== Reception ==
On the review aggregator website Rotten Tomatoes, 90% of 10 critics' reviews are positive. Matt Donato of Bloody Disgusting gave the film a mostly positive review, calling it "a disturbed psycho-vacation freakout" that's "hard to pin down and all the better for its elusiveness, like a romantic comedy that fell in with the wrong (but right) horror crowd." Mary Beth McAndrews of Dread Central also gave the film a positive review, calling it "darkly hilarious" and "a delectable entry into the cannibal woman subgenre of horror that also serves as a magnifying glass on the damage inflicted by toxic relationships."
