= Pecota =

Pecota may refer to:

- PECOTA (Player Empirical Comparison and Optimization Test Algorithm), a statistical method for baseball analysis
- Bill Pecota
- Marco Pecota
