= Percy Jackson (film series) =

American children's fantasy film series

Percy Jackson & the Olympians
- Percy Jackson logo as used in the second film
- Directed by: Chris Columbus (1); Thor Freudenthal (2)
- Screenplay by: Craig Titley (1); Marc Guggenheim (2)
- Produced by: Michael Barnathan; Karen Rosenfelt; Chris Columbus (1); Mark Radcliffe (1)
- Starring: Logan Lerman; Brandon T. Jackson; Alexandra Daddario; Jake Abel
- Cinematography: Stephen Goldblatt (1); Shelly Johnson (2)
- Edited by: Peter Honess (1); Mark Goldblatt (2)
- Music by: Christophe Beck (1); Andrew Lockington (2)
- Production companies: Fox 2000 Pictures; 1492 Pictures; Sunswept Entertainment; Dune Entertainment (1)
- Distributed by: 20th Century Fox
- Release dates: February 12, 2010 (1); August 7, 2013 (2)
- Running time: 224 minutes
- Countries: United States; Canada
- Budget: $185 million
- Box office: $428.7 million

Percy Jackson & the Olympians (also known as Percy Jackson) is a series of two films based on the novel series of the same name by the author Rick Riordan. The series was distributed by 20th Century Fox and produced by 1492 Pictures. The first film, Percy Jackson & the Olympians: The Lightning Thief (2010), was directed by Chris Columbus and was released on February 12, 2010. The second installment, Percy Jackson: Sea of Monsters, was originally intended to be released in March 2013 but was instead pushed back to August 7, 2013, and was directed by Thor Freudenthal. While a third film was planned, and the second film laid the foundation for it, it was ultimately never produced. The series in total grossed nearly $430 million at the worldwide box office. A reboot television series premiered on Disney+ in December 2023.

The films follow the adventures of demigod Percy Jackson and his comrades at the demigod training ground of Camp Half-Blood. In the first film, Percy must go on a quest to save his mother from the underworld and prove his innocence when he is accused of stealing lightning from Zeus. The second film revolves around Percy's escapades as he must retrieve the legendary Golden Fleece from the Sea of Monsters, or the Bermuda Triangle, which is the only thing that will save the camp from the forces of darkness.

== Films ==
=== Percy Jackson & the Olympians: The Lightning Thief (2010) ===
In June 2004, 20th Century Fox acquired feature film rights to the book. In April 2007, director Chris Columbus was hired to helm the project. Filming began in April 2009 in Vancouver. The film was released on February 12, 2010. It was met with mixed reviews upon release and was a commercial success, grossing almost $227 million at the worldwide box office against a budget of $95 million. The plot revolves around a sixteen-year-old Percy Jackson who discovers that he is the son of Poseidon, Greek God of the sea, and goes to Camp Half-Blood, a training camp for demigods, the half mortal children of Greek gods. When Percy's mom is kidnapped by Hades, and Percy is accused of stealing Zeus' lightning bolt, Percy and his friends go on a quest to rescue his mom from the underworld, leading them across America to find Persephone's pearls, while proving that Percy is not the lightning thief and is innocent.

=== Percy Jackson: Sea of Monsters (2013) ===
In October 2011, 20th Century Fox announced a sequel based on the second book, The Sea of Monsters. The film was released on August 7, 2013. Percy Jackson, son of Greek god Poseidon, discovers he has a half-brother, Tyson a Cyclops, and embarks on a journey with his friends to retrieve the Golden Fleece to save a magical tree containing the spirit of Zeus's daughter Thalia Grace who died at the gates of Camp Half-Blood while saving Annabeth, Luke and Grover. This tree protects their training ground, Camp Half-Blood and reinforces their borders. They must travel to the Sea of Monsters to save the fleece, and conquer the challenges that may await them. The film grossed just over $202 million at the worldwide box office.

== Cast and crew ==
=== Cast ===
List indicators

This section includes characters who have appeared in the films.

- An empty grey cell indicates the character was not in the film.
- ^{Y} indicates a younger version of the character.

Character	Film	
Character	The Lightning Thief (2010)	Sea of Monsters (2013)
Main characters
Percy Jackson	Logan Lerman	Logan Lerman
Annabeth Chase	Alexandra Daddario	Alexandra Daddario Alisha Newton^{Y}
Grover Underwood	Brandon T. Jackson	Brandon T. Jackson Bjorn Yearwood^{Y}
Luke Castellan	Jake Abel	Jake Abel Samuel Braun^{Y}
Mr. Brunner / Chiron	Pierce Brosnan	Anthony Head
Tyson		Douglas Smith
Clarisse La Rue		Leven Rambin
Gods and Titans
Zeus	Sean Bean	Sean Bean (Deleted scene)
Poseidon	Kevin McKidd	Mentioned
Hades	Steve Coogan	Mentioned
Hera	Erica Cerra	
Athena	Melina Kanakaredes	Mentioned
Hermes	Dylan Neal	Nathan Fillion
Demeter	Stefanie von Pfetten	
Apollo	Dimitri Lekkos	
Artemis	Ona Grauer	
Mr. D / Dionysus	Luke Camilleri	Stanley Tucci
Ares	Ray Winstone	Mentioned
Aphrodite	Serinda Swan	Mentioned
Hephaestus	Conrad Coates	
Persephone	Rosario Dawson	
Kronos	Mentioned	Robert Knepper
Camp Half-Blood demigods
Thalia Grace		Paloma Kwiatkowski Katelyn Mager^{Y}
Chris Rodriguez		Grey Damon
Humans
Sally Jackson	Catherine Keener	
Gabe Ugliano	Joe Pantoliano	

=== Crew ===
Film	Director	Producer	Writer	Composer	Editor	Cinematographer
Percy Jackson & the Olympians: The Lightning Thief	Chris Columbus	Mark Radcliffe, Chris Columbus, Karen Rosenfelt & Michael Barnathan	Craig Titley	Christophe Beck	Peter Honess	Stephen Goldblatt
Percy Jackson: Sea of Monsters	Thor Freudenthal	Chris Columbus, Karen Rosenfelt & Michael Barnathan	Marc Guggenheim	Andrew Lockington	Mark Goldblatt	Shelly Johnson

== Reception ==
=== Box office performance ===
Film	Release date	Box office gross			Box office ranking		Budget	Ref.
Film	Release date	North America	Other territories	Worldwide	All time North America	All time worldwide	Budget	Ref.
The Lightning Thief	February 12, 2010	$88,768,303	$137,728,906	$226,497,209	#651	#495	$95,000,000	
Sea of Monsters	August 7, 2013	$68,519,879	$133,728,197	$202,247,751	#937	#581	$90,000,000	
Total		$157,288,182	$271,456,667	$428,744,970			$185,000,000	

=== Critical and public response ===
Film	Rotten Tomatoes	Metacritic	CinemaScore
The Lightning Thief	49% (150 reviews)	47 (31 reviews)	B+
Sea of Monsters	42% (118 reviews)	39 (35 reviews)	B+

=== Criticism from the author ===
Rick Riordan, the author of the book series, has mentioned in numerous interviews that he has never seen the films, to keep them from influencing the way he views the characters. During March 2016, Riordan wrote a letter asking teachers not to show the films to students during class time. Both films received criticism for their deviation from the source material, with the second film in particular being criticized for having merged the plots of both the second and fifth books of the series. In 2018, Riordan wrote a blog post detailing how limited his influence on the production of the films was, while also making public some of the e-mails he sent to the films' producers, in which he expressed concern over the ways they were altering his stories.

== Music ==
Soundtracks to Percy Jackson films
Title	U.S. release date	Length	Composer(s)	Label
Percy Jackson & the Olympians: The Lightning Thief (Original Motion Picture Soundtrack)	February 5, 2010	59:07	Christophe Beck	ABKCO
Percy Jackson: Sea of Monsters (Original Motion Picture Soundtrack)	August 6, 2013	1:08:54	Andrew Lockington	Sony Classical

== Reboot ==
The rights to the Percy Jackson novels were transferred to Disney following its acquisition of 21st Century Fox in 2019. In May 2020, Riordan announced that Disney would be producing a live-action television series following the story of the series, with the first season adapting The Lightning Thief. Riordan also confirmed that he, along with his wife Becky, would be involved in the development of the series, a significant departure from the film series, in which Riordan was mostly shut out of the filmmaking process. The series was greenlit in January 2022, began production in June 2022, and premiered on Disney+ on December 19, 2023.
