= Rupinder Nagra =

Indian-Canadian actor

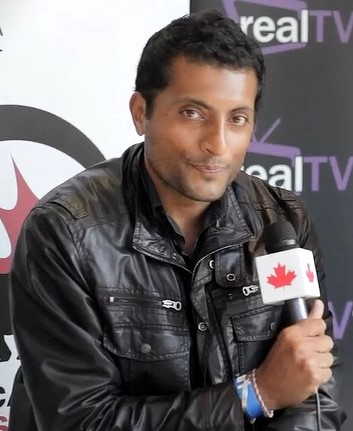
- Born: Punjab, India
- Occupations: Actor; film producer

Rupinder Nagra is an Indian actor who works in Canadian, Indian and British films. He was a nominated for Best Actor at the 29th Genie Awards for his role in the film Amal.

In January 2016, he appeared as "father" in My Brothers & Sisters, a play about radicalisation, at the Sarah Siddons Theatre, London. The play was produced by Mad'Ed Theatre and directed by Darren Luke Mawdsley.

== Personal life ==
He was raised in Hamilton, Ontario, Canada and trained in improvisation at The Second City in Toronto.

== Filmography ==
- Bollywood/Hollywood (2002) as Rahul's friend
- The Associates (2001)
- Sue Thomas: F.B.Eye (2003) as Hakim Quadir
- Amal (2007) as Amal Kumar
- Mayday (2008) as M. Singh
- Kurbaan (2009) as Hamid
- I'll Follow You Down (2013) as Real Estate Agent
- The Escape (2015) as Dr. Singh
- Simran (2017) as Mike
- Omerta (2017) as Maulana Ismail
- The Etruscan Smile (2018) as Police Officer
- Bard of Blood (2019)
- Do Not Disturb (2022) as Saj
- B.R.I (2023) as Mr. Johnson
- Bring It All Back Home (2025) as Harvinder

== Plays ==
- The Other Place, London, 2018

== Nominations ==
- Best Actor at the 29th Genie Awards
