= Percy Jackson (disambiguation) =

Percy Jackson is the title character and narrator of Rick Riordan's Percy Jackson & the Olympians series.

Percy Jackson most commonly also refers to:

- Percy Jackson & the Olympians, an American fantasy novel series
- Percy Jackson (film series), an American feature film series based on the novel series
  - Percy Jackson & the Olympians: The Lightning Thief, the first film of the series
  - Percy Jackson: Sea of Monsters, the second film of the series
- Percy Jackson and the Olympians (TV series), an American TV series based on the novel series

Percy Jackson may also refer to:

- Percy Jackson (ice hockey) (1906–1972), ice hockey player
- Percy Jackson (footballer, born 1907) (1907–1970), Australian rules footballer
- Percy Jackson (footballer, born 1894) (1894–1959), Australian rules footballer
