= Passchendaele (film) =

2008 Canadian film by Paul Gross

- Theatrical release poster
- Directed by: Paul Gross
- Written by: Paul Gross
- Produced by: Paul Gross; Niv Fichman; Frank Siracusa; Francis Damberger
- Starring: Paul Gross; Caroline Dhavernas; Gil Bellows; Joe Dinicol; Meredith Bailey; Jim Mezon
- Cinematography: Gregory Middleton
- Edited by: David Wharnsby
- Music by: Jan A. P. Kaczmarek
- Production companies: Damberger Film & Cattle; Rhombus Media; Whizbang Films
- Distributed by: Alliance Films
- Release dates: September 4, 2008 (Toronto International Film Festival); October 17, 2008 (Canada)
- Running time: 114 minutes
- Country: Canada
- Language: English
- Budget: $20 million
- Box office: $4.4 million

Passchendaele is a 2008 Canadian war film, written, co-produced, directed by, and starring Paul Gross. The film, which was shot in Calgary, Alberta, Fort Macleod, Alberta, and in Belgium, focuses on the experiences of a Canadian soldier, Michael Dunne, at the Battle of Passchendaele, also known as the Third Battle of Ypres, inspired by stories that Gross heard from his grandfather, a First World War soldier.

The film had its premiere at the 2008 Toronto International Film Festival on September 4, 2008, when it also had the honour of opening the festival. The film received a mixed reception upon release. On March 2, 2009, Paul Gross was honoured for his film Passchendaele, winning that year's National Arts Centre Award for achievement over the past performance year. The film won five awards at the 29th Genie Awards, including Best Picture, and also received the Golden Reel Award for Canada's top-grossing film of 2008.

== Plot ==
Sergeant Michael Dunne of the 10th Battalion, CEF, has survived the Battle of Vimy Ridge but suffers from neurasthenia and is sent home to Calgary, Alberta, for recovery. While in hospital he meets nurse Sarah Mann (Caroline Dhavernas). David Mann (Joe Dinicol), Sarah's younger brother, is ineligible for military service due to asthma but is determined to enlist. The Manns are ostracized when it becomes known their father died at Vimy Ridge fighting for the Germans. The father of David's girlfriend pulls strings to enlist David. Dunne reenlists as a private under his mother's maiden name, McCrae, promising Sarah he will protect her brother.

David and Michael deploy to the Western Front. Sarah also enlists and is assigned as a nurse in triage at an advanced dressing station near the front. The three arrive in Flanders in time for the Battle of Passchendaele. Dunne encounters Sarah when he brings a wounded man to the aid station. His cover as McCrae is blown, but he evades punishment and Lieutenant-Colonel Ormond promotes him to platoon leader on the strength of his reputation and the need for experienced soldiers.

When the Little Black Devils are pinned down by a German counter-attack, Dunne's company is sent to reinforce them. The 8th Battalion withdraws, believing Dunne's company to be their relief. David suffers a stress-induced attack and Dunne calms him temporarily. A German counter-attack breaking into the Canadian line is repelled after close quarters combat. David breaks down, runs after the enemy, and jumps into their trench begging in German. An artillery shell blasts him onto a cross created by duckboards and barbed wire barricades, reminiscent of the crucified soldier myth. Dunne runs to David and is shot but continues crawling to the cross. The Germans stop firing long enough to allow him to carry David back to his own lines. David lives, but Dunne is carried to the hospital where he dies after his last words with Sarah. Word arrives that the Canadians have captured Passchendaele Ridge.

David, using a wheelchair, Sarah Mann, David's girlfriend Cassie, Highway and Dunne's best friend Royster (Gil Bellows) pay tribute at Dunne's grave on his farm. The marker has been altered to remove the "5" of 1915 and changed to 1917. The scene morphs to a giant field of Canadian war graves with a riderless horse on the horizon.

== Cast ==
- Paul Gross as Sergeant Michael Dunne
- Caroline Dhavernas as Sarah Mann
- Joe Dinicol as David Mann
- Meredith Bailey as Cassie Walker
- Jim Mezon as Dobson-Hughes
- Michael Greyeyes as Highway
- Adam Harrington as Lieutenant Colonel Ormond
- Gil Bellows as Royster
- David Ley as Doctor Walker
- Joe Desmond as Lieutenant Hanson
- Brian Jensen as Major Bingham
- James Kot as Skinner
- Jesse Frechette as Peters
- Hugh Probyn as Carmichael
- Brian Dooley as McKinnon

== Production ==
Production on the film reportedly began on August 20, 2007, with principal photography in Calgary, Alberta. The film was shot over a period of forty-five days and involved over 200 actors, some of them Canadian Forces soldiers with combat experience in Afghanistan. Battle scenes were filmed on the Tsuu T'ina Nation reserve just outside Calgary, and principal photography finished in October 2007. The film was edited by David Wharnsby, and its score composed by Jan A.P. Kaczmarek.

== Inspiration ==
This film was inspired by Gross's relationship with his maternal grandfather, Michael Joseph Dunne, who served in the 56th, 5th, 14th and 23rd Reserve Battalions, CEF, in the First World War. Like many veterans, he was reticent about sharing his experiences with his family. In a rare conversation on a fishing trip, Dunne told the story of bayonetting a young German soldier, who had eyes like water, through the head and killing him during a battle. A long time later, as Dunne lay in a hospital bed in the last days of his life, his family was mystified by Dunne's behaviour of asking for forgiveness, over and over. Only Gross knew that he was speaking to the young German he had killed.

"He went completely out of his mind at the end. He started telling me about a hideous event that happened during a skirmish in a little ruined town in World War I. He'd killed someone in a miserable, horrible way and that had obviously haunted him throughout the rest of his life. As my grandfather died, in his mind he was back in that town, trying to find a German boy whom he'd bayonetted in the forehead. He'd lived with that memory all his life – and he was of a time when people kept things to themselves. When he finally told the story, it really affected me and I've not been able to get it out of my head."

During the early portion of the film, the scene is recreated in a broken church, when Sergeant Michael Dunne bayonets a young German soldier through the forehead.

== Funding ==
In November 2005, the Government of Alberta announced a $5.5-million grant to Gross and the film project as part of Alberta's centennial; the overall budget has been announced at between $16 million and $20 million, making it the highest-budgeted Canadian-produced film ever. The film was publicly announced at a news conference at the Museum of the Regiments on November 13, 2005.

"The province's centennial is a time to recognize our past and tell our stories, including those about Alberta's military heritage. We must work to keep our veterans' sacrifices in the forefront of our minds. The story of Passchendaele pays tribute to a key event in our country's history, and will educate Albertans and all Canadians for years to come." – Premier Ralph Klein

== Historical background ==
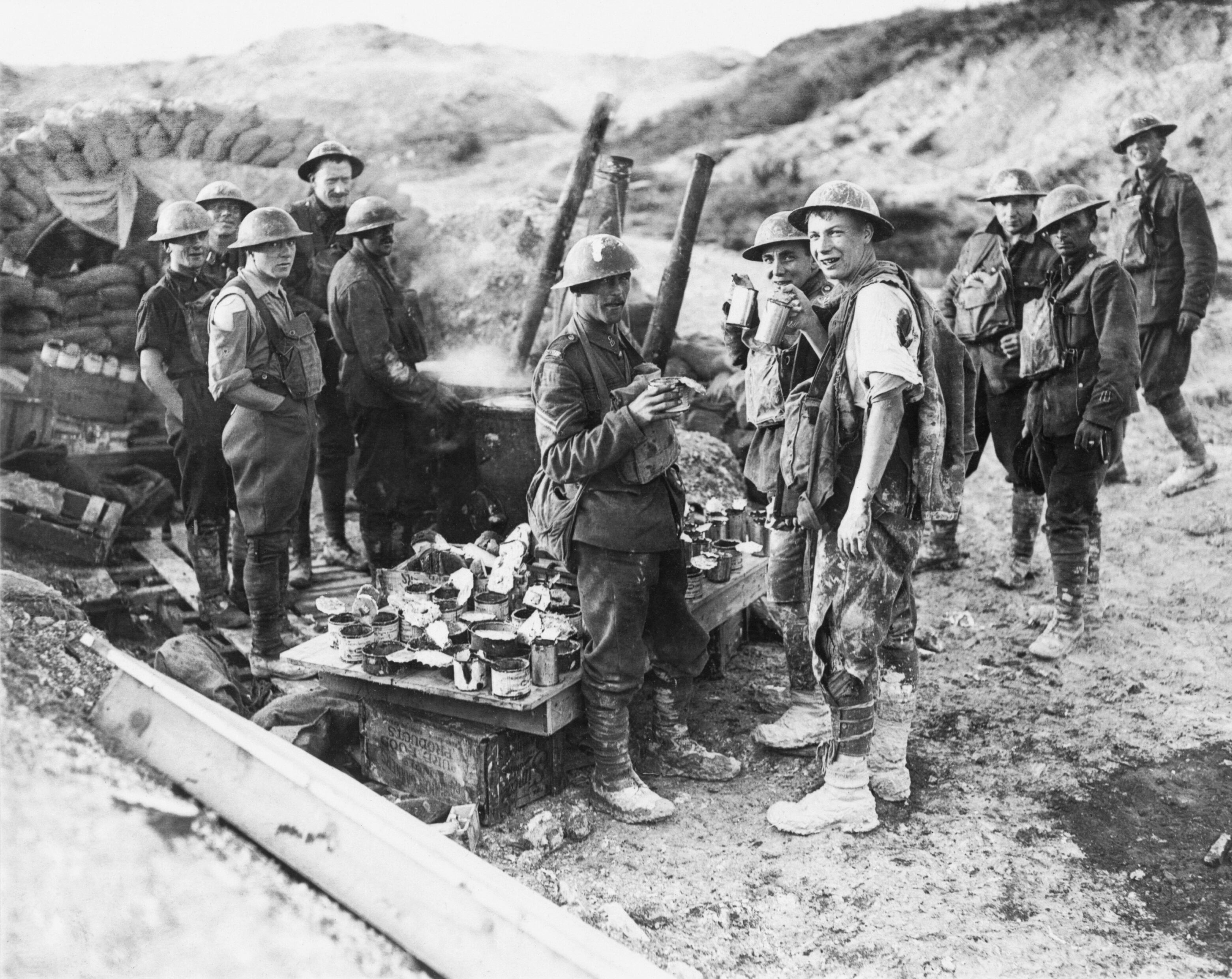
Canadians "100 yards from Boche lines" during the push on Hill 70.

The 10th Battalion was originally formed from Albertans and Manitobans, though as the war progressed it became identified solely as an Alberta battalion. The "Fighting Tenth" served with the 1st Canadian Division and participated in all major Canadian battles of the war, and set the record for highest number of individual bravery awards for a single battle. At Hill 70, sixty men were awarded the Military Medal for the fighting there, in addition to a Victoria Cross, three Distinguished Service Orders, seven Military Crosses, and nine Distinguished Conduct Medals.

"Named for a village located on a low rise in the Ypres Salient, the very word Passchendaele has become synonymous with suffering and waste. Strong German defences in this area, developed over the course of more than two years, gave the British extremely hard going. "The Tenth Battalion were called out of reserve to assist an attack on Hill 52, part of the same low rise Passchendaele itself was situated on. The Battalion was not scheduled to attack, but the CO wisely prepared his soldiers as if they would be making the main assault – a decision that paid dividends when the unit was called out of reserve. On 10 November 1917, the Tenth Battalion took the feature with light casualties."

=== Accuracy ===
The battle scene at the end of the movie depicts a relief of the 8th Battalion, CEF (known by their nickname "The Little Black Devils") by the 10th Battalion, an action that actually happened, as described by the history of the 10th Battalion:

At this point, a terrible misunderstanding occurred. Major Bingham knew that he was merely reinforcing the 8th, but The Little Black Devils believed that they were being relieved. Bingham argued the point to no avail, and watched with dismay as the mud-caked survivors of the 8th pulled out and slogged to the rear, leaving A Company to hold an entire battalion's frontage. Undaunted, the major deployed his men in a dangerously thin line, linking up with the 7th Battalion to the right. But Bingham surely realized that it would be impossible to hold this position in the face of a counter-attack.

Lieutenant Colonel Ormond, the Commanding Officer of the 10th (also a character in the film) gave a handwritten account of the relief in which he said:

I then agreed to take over the front line from the 7th and 8th Battalions...On returning to Battalion headquarters I found orders that a relief would not be carried out, but as it had already been done, and the OC 8th Battalion had left to acquaint the GOC of the situation, no other action was taken.

== Reception ==
Passchendaele received mixed or poor reviews from critics. As of April 8, 2022, the review aggregator Rotten Tomatoes reported that 40% of critics gave the film a positive review, with an average score of 5 out of 10, based on 15 reviews.

=== Box office ===
The film went on to gross only $4,452,423, well under its $20 million budget. Nonetheless, it received the Golden Reel Award as the top-grossing Canadian film of 2008.

== Awards ==
On March 2, 2009, Paul Gross was honoured for Passchendaele, winning that year's National Arts Centre Award for achievement over the past performance year.

At the 29th Genie Awards, the film won the Achievement in Art Direction/Production Design, Achievement in Costume Design, Achievement in Overall Sound, Achievement in Sound Editing, and Best Picture.
