= Fugueuse =

Canadian television series

- Genre: Drama
- Created by: Michelle Allen
- Directed by: Eric Tessier
- Starring: Ludivine Reding; Jean-François Ruel; Claude Legault; Lynda Johnson
- Country of origin: Canada
- Original language: French
- No. of seasons: 2
- No. of episodes: 20

Production
- Running time: 42 minutes
- Production company: Encore Television

Original release
- Network: TVA
- Release: January 8, 2018 – March 9, 2020

Fugueuse (Runaway in English) is a French-Canadian television drama series which premiered on January 8, 2018, on TVA. The series stars Ludivine Reding as Fanny Couture, a teenage girl from a middle-class family, who is methodically manipulated into a world of prostitution by a network of human traffickers. The plot continues four years later in Season 2, which premiered on January 6, 2020.

== Cast ==
- Ludivine Reding: Fanny Couture
- Lynda Johnson: Mylene Couture, Fanny's mother
- Claude Legault: Laurent Couture, Fanny's father
- Jean-François Ruel: Damien Stone/Antoine Tremblay
- Danielle Proulx: Manon, Fanny's grandma
- Kimberly Laferrière: Natacha
- Laurence Latreille: Ariane Béliveau-Leduc
- Camille Felton: Jessica Rivet-De Souza
- Amadou Madani Tall: Fred
- Iannicko N'Doua-Légaré: Carlo Stevenson
- Geneviève Rochette: Sylvie Béliveau, Ariane's mother
- Stéphane Crête: Ariane's father
- Charlotte Aubin: Peggy, Ariane's stepmother
- Miryam 'Mimo' Magri: Michelle Garcia

== Production staff ==
- Series created by Michelle Allen
- Directed by Eric Tessier
- Music by Christian Clermont
- Produced by François Rozon and Vincent Gagné
- A Encore Television production
- Original network: TVA

== Awards ==
- Prix Gémeaux 2018 :
  - Best actor in a supporting role : Claude Legault
