= Lyne Charlebois =

Canadian film and television director

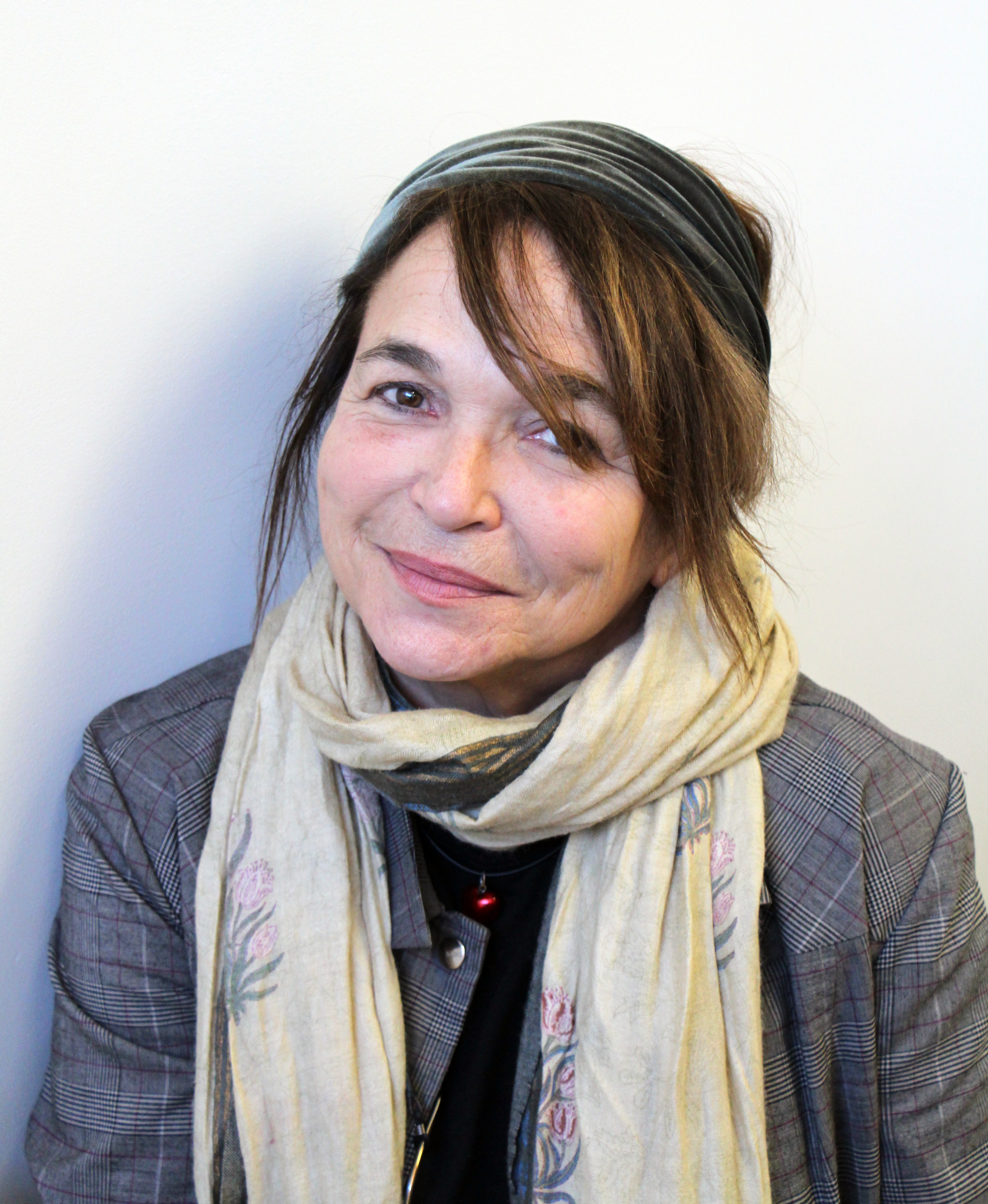
- Occupations: film, television and music video director, photographer
- Years active: 1980s–present
- Notable work: Borderline

Lyne Charlebois is a Canadian film and television director, most noted as the director and cowriter of the 2008 film Borderline.

Charlebois began her career as a photographer, who had one of her first jobs in the film industry shooting promotional stills for Jean-Claude Lauzon's 1987 film Night Zoo. She then became a music video director for artists including Daniel Bélanger and Laurence Jalbert. She won a Prix Félix for Best Video in 1991 for Marjo's "Je sais, je sais", and in 1992 for Bélanger's "Opium", and was a three-time Juno Award nominee for Best Music Video for Spirit of the West's "Political" at the Juno Awards of 1992, Mae Moore's "Bohemia" at the Juno Awards of 1993 and for Gogh Van Go's "Tunnel of Trees" at the Juno Awards of 1995. She won the award in 1995.

She subsequently worked in television, directing episodes of Bliss, Tabou, Nos étés and Sophie, and made the short films Quel jour était-ce? in 2001 and Nous sommes tous les jours in 2006.

She collaborated with Marie-Sissi Labrèche on the screenplay for Borderline, and directed the film. At the 29th Genie Awards in 2009, Charlebois and Labrèche were cowinners of the Genie Award for Best Adapted Screenplay, and Charlebois was a shortlisted nominee for the Genie Award for Best Director; at the 2009 Prix Jutra, she won the award for Best Director.

Tell Me Why These Things Are So Beautiful (Dis-moi pourquoi ces choses sont si belles), her first feature film since Borderline, premiered at the 2023 Abitibi-Témiscamingue International Film Festival.
