= Francis Damberger =

Francis Damberger is a Canadian film and television director, producer and screenwriter. He is most noted for his 1991 film Solitaire, for which he was a Genie Award nominee for Best Original Screenplay at the 13th Genie Awards, and as a producer of Passchendaele, which won the Genie for Best Picture at the 29th Genie Awards.

Damberger studied acting at the University of Alberta, where he won second prize in a local playwriting competition in 1983 for his play Rat Tails. He made the short films On the Edge, The Road to Yorkton and Age Is No Barrier before releasing Solitaire, his debut feature film, in 1991. He subsequently directed the feature films Road to Saddle River (1994) and Heart of the Sun (1998). He has also directed episodes of television series, including North of 60, Due South, Jake and the Kid, So Weird, Mentors, Tom Stone, Caitlin's Way, Mixed Blessings, Heartland and Tiny Plastic Men.

He has also continued to appear in supporting or guest roles as an actor.
