= Marie-Sissi Labrèche =

Canadian writer

- Born: 1969 (age 56–57); Montreal, Quebec
- Occupations: novelist, short story writer, screenwriter
- Years active: 2000s-present
- Notable work: Borderline

Marie-Sissi Labrèche (born 1969 in Montreal, Quebec) is a Canadian writer, most noted as the cowriter of the 2008 film Borderline. The film's screenplay was based on two of Labrèche's published novels, Borderline and La Brèche. At the 29th Genie Awards in 2009, Labrèche and her cowriter Lyne Charlebois were cowinners of the Genie Award for Best Adapted Screenplay.

Her novel Borderline was subsequently selected for the 2009 edition of Le Combat des livres.

== Works ==
- Borderline (2008)
- La Brèche (2002)
- Montréal, la marge au cœur (2004)
- La Lune dans un HLM (2006)
- Psy malgré moi (2009)
- Amour et autres violences (2012)
- La Vie sur Mars (2014)
