= India in a Day =

- Directed by: Richie Mehta
- Produced by: Jack Arbuthnott; Cassandra Sigsgaard
- Edited by: Beverley Mills
- Music by: Stephen Warbeck
- Production companies: Scott Free Productions; Phantom Films; YouTube, Inc.
- Release date: 14 June 2016 (United Kingdom)
- Running time: 86 minutes
- Countries: India; United Kingdom
- Languages: English; Hindi; Tamil; Telugu; Bengali; Marathi; Kannada; Garhwali; Bhojpuri

India in a Day is a crowdsourced, feature-length documentary produced by Scott Free Productions, Phantom Films and Google. The footage featured in the film was submitted by members of the public in India in a single day on 10 October 2015.

Running at 86 minutes long, the film is India's largest crowdsourced documentary film, with over 365 hours of footage recorded during the 24-hour filming period.

== Production ==
Directed by Richie Mehta, the film consists of a series of clips selected from over 16,000 videos received over a single day which were then edited together by Beverley Mills. The footage submitted by participants was uploaded to a website set up by Scott Free and Google. It was the job of the data management team and assistant editors to ensure the smooth and safe transition of this material through to the editorial team. The loggers were each assigned individual participants and used a rating system (1 for unusable footage to 5 for amazing footage) to assess each clip before it would be seen by Mehta, Mills, and the creative consultants.

The concept of the film is based on the film Life in a Day, which was also produced by Scott Free and YouTube. It used footage shot by people from 192 countries around the world who filmed their day on 24 July 2010.

== Film release and box office ==
The completed film had its world premiere at the Sheffield International Documentary Festival on Tuesday 14 June 2016, and its international premiere at the Toronto International Film Festival on Friday 9 September 2016. The film had a short theatrical release in key cities in India on Friday 23 September 2016.

== Reception ==
The film has received generally positive reviews from critics. It does not yet have a Rotten Tomatoes rating.

Allan Hunter from Screen Daily said 'the film exudes a best-foot-forward positivity, and cumulative message of progress from the past and hope for the future makes it even more likely to appeal to audiences.' Sonam Joshi from the Huffington Post in India describes the film as 'a fascinating, crowdsourced 90-minute documentary feature film.'

Diana Mehta, of The Canadian Press, described the film as having 'beautiful shots of natural splendour and potentially shocking glimpses of squalor.'

Manish Gaekwad from Scroll. In, said the film was 'an engaging insight into the sights and sounds of the country and what its citizens make of it.'

The Free Press Journal reported that the film 'received an overwhelming response from the audience' at a premiere at the Jio Mami Film Club in October 2016.
