= Everything Is Fine (film) =

- French: Tout est parfait
- Directed by: Yves-Christian Fournier
- Written by: Yves-Christian Fournier; Guillaume Vigneault
- Produced by: Martine Beauchemin; Nicole Robert
- Starring: Maxime Dumontier; Chloé Bourgeois
- Cinematography: Sara Mishara
- Edited by: Yvann Thibaudeau
- Music by: Patrick Lavoie; Loco Locass
- Production company: Go Films
- Distributed by: Les Films Séville; Entertainment One
- Release date: March 1, 2008
- Running time: 118 minutes
- Country: Canada
- Language: French

Everything Is Fine (French: Tout est parfait) is a French Canadian film directed by Yves-Christian Fournier. It tells the story of a young man trying to cope with the simultaneous suicide of his four friends.

== Reactions ==
"Tout est parfait is the best film of 2008, and one of the most powerful to come out of this province in years." (The Gazette)

== Awards ==
The film won the 2009 Claude Jutra Award for best feature film by a first-time director at the 29th Genie Awards.

== Cast ==
- Maxime Dumontier: Josh
- Chloé Bourgeois: Mia
- Maxime Bessette: Thomas
- Sébastien Bergeron-Carranza: Simon
- Jean-Noel Raymond-Jetté: Alex
- Niels Schneider: Sasha
- Normand D'Amour: Henri
- Claude Legault: Dominic (Josh's father)
- Marie Turgeon: Stéphanie
- Anie Pascale: Geneviève
