= Ludivine Reding =

Canadian actress

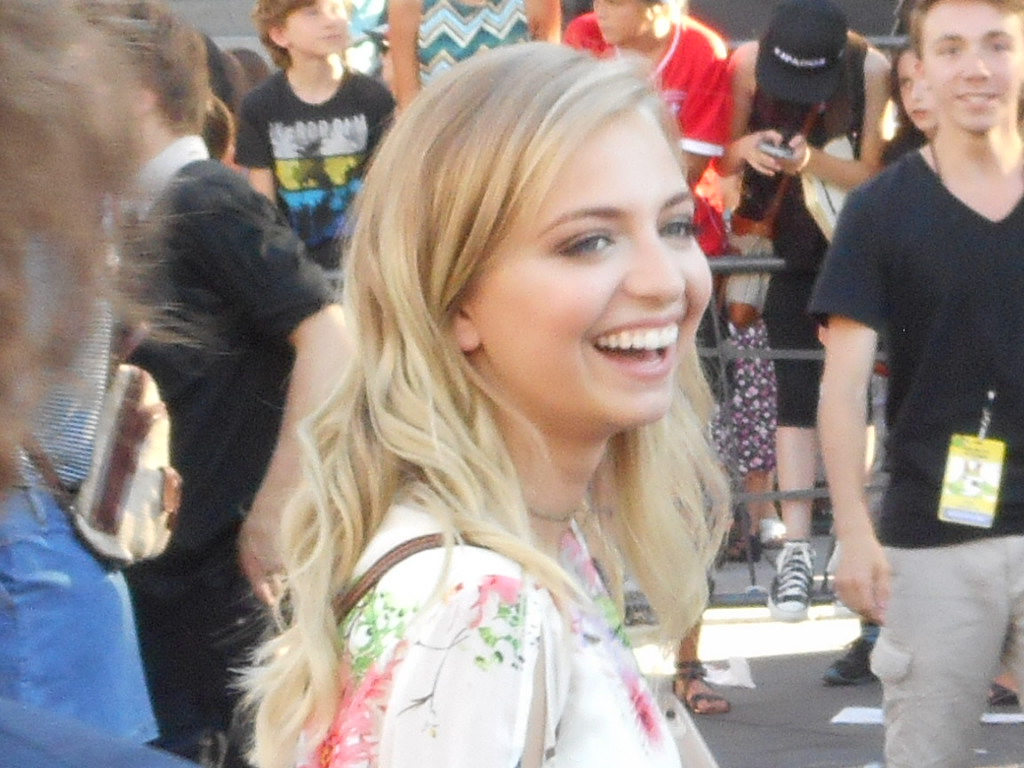
- Born: Vénutia-Ludivine Dubé Reding; 6 February 1997 (age 28); Montreal, Quebec, Canada
- Occupation: Actress
- Years active: 2004–present
- Known for: Fugueuse; La théorie du K.O.; La Derape
- Notable work: The Kate Logan Affair; Ego Trip
- Parents: Sébastien Reding (father); Geneviève Dubé (mother)
- Relatives: Godefroy Reding (brother)
- Website: ludivinereding.com

Vénutia-Ludivine Dubé Reding (born 6 February 1997), professionally known as Ludivine Reding, is an actress from Montreal, Canada. She played Fanny Couture in the television series Fugueuse. Her father is a Belgian immigrant and her mother is from Quebec.
