= Susanna Fournier =

Canadian actress and playwright

Susanna Fournier is a Canadian actress and playwright whose roles include Grace in I'll Follow You Down and Zoe Gonzalez in Being Human.

== Writing ==
Fournier is one of the writers of Lulu v. 7: Aspects of a Femme Fatale, produced in Toronto in 2018.

== Awards ==
Susanna Fournier won the 2018 Patrick Conner Award.

== Filmography ==
- Being Human
- Still Life: A Three Pines Mystery 2013
- I'll Follow You Down 2013
- X-Men: Days of Future Past 2014
- 12 Monkeys 2015
- Journey Back to Christmas 2016
- Shadowhunters 2016
