= Whitewash (2013 film) =

- Film poster
- Directed by: Emanuel Hoss-Desmarais
- Written by: Emanuel Hoss-Desmarais; Marc Tulin
- Produced by: Luc Déry; Kim McCraw
- Starring: Thomas Haden Church; Anie Pascale; Marc Labrèche; Isabelle Nélisse; Geneviève Laroche
- Cinematography: André Turpin
- Edited by: Arthur Tarnowski
- Music by: Sei Nakauchi Pelletier
- Production company: micro_scope
- Distributed by: Entertainment One
- Release date: 19 April 2013
- Running time: 90 minutes
- Country: Canada
- Language: English

Whitewash is a 2013 Canadian drama film directed by Emanuel Hoss-Desmarais and written by Hoss-Desmarais and Marc Tulin. The film stars Thomas Haden Church as Bruce, an unemployed snowplow driver in rural Quebec who develops a pseudo-friendship with Paul, a man who hides his deep disturbances behind a facade of warm demeanor which is slowly revealed through a series of sporadic flashbacks. The film's cast also includes Anie Pascale, Marc Labrèche, Isabelle Nélisse, Geneviève Laroche, Emanuel Hoss-Desmarais and Vincent Hoss-Desmarais.

== Plot ==
Bruce is a snowplow driver in a small remote town in Quebec. While driving drunk during a snowstorm, Bruce fatally strikes a pedestrian. After Bruce panics and hides the body in a snowbank, he drives deep into the woods in a stupor and falls asleep. When he wakes, he finds that the vehicle has become stuck. Stranded in the freezing cold without supplies, he initially sets off to find help but returns to the snowplow when he sees no nearby signs of civilization. Left with nothing but his own thoughts, Bruce practices his statement to the police. During the imaginary conversations, he becomes overcome with emotion when told that his victim had children.

As Bruce wrestles with his guilty conscience, flashbacks reveal that the dead man, Paul, was Bruce's houseguest. Leaving a convenience store and coming across Paul in his vehicle attempting to commit suicide by inhaling vehicle exhaust fumes, unplugging the hose, Bruce starts conversation with Paul, admiring his vehicle and eventually commandeers the vehicle, driving around casually with Paul, developing a casual friendship, though Bruce becomes frustrated when Paul takes advantage of his hospitality and requests a loan. Bruce, a widower who has fallen on hard times after he lost his job due to drunkenly crashing his snowplow into a restaurant, explains that he can not help Paul. When Paul notices Bruce's collection of highly realistic ocular prostheses, Paul claims his proficiency with web design to Bruce and offers to set up an online presence to sell the collection. Bruce declines the offer and says that he can not bring himself to sell his wife's crafts.

In the present, Bruce leaves his snowplow once again after he runs out of gas. After a long trek, he finds a restaurant, where he learns from the newspaper that both he and Paul have been reported missing. After stocking up on supplies, he returns to his snowplow. When his supplies run out again, he investigates the area further and finds a large house near a frozen lake. He breaks into the shed and steals supplies, then hides there overnight when the owners return. In the morning, Simone, the owner's daughter, discovers him, and he frightens her. He apologizes to her father, Eric, and retreats into the woods.

Later, when Eric and his friend go into the woods to look for him, Bruce injures his ankle while he hides. Frustrated and unable to hobble back to civilization, he camps out on Eric's land and engages in more imaginary conversations with the police. Further flashbacks reveal that Bruce caught Paul stealing; he was pursuing Paul when he accidentally struck him. Paul seemingly smiles as the snowplow hits him, which causes Bruce to wonder if it was a second suicide attempt. Bruce also implicates the snowplow itself in the accident and becomes increasingly hostile toward it. This culminates as Bruce dumps his remaining gasoline on the snowplow and lights it on fire.

When Bruce's ankle heals, he breaks into Eric's shed again and steals a snowmobile. He digs up Paul's body and disposes of it in a frozen lake, but he is caught in the act. The witnesses flee, and Bruce returns to his own home, where he becomes increasingly paranoid. When he realises that two men are looking for him either the police or accomplices of Eric, Bruce attempts to hide in the snowplow banging his boot and attracting attention but they pass away. Bruce attempts to repair the snowplow but his expertise is limited. Bruce is obviously beginning to starve as he attempts to eat tree bark and is numbingly bored as the area around the snowplow becomes increasingly worn down. In the last moments, the winter gets milder but the cold quickly returns. The film's epilogue is Bruce voice of thought; with two life observances: "every guilty person is his own hangman", "...and each new day will be better"; concluding with, "Goddamn, it's freezing."

== Cast ==
- Thomas Haden Church as Bruce
- Marc Labrèche as Paul
- Anie Pascale as Waitress
- Isabelle Nélisse as Simone
- Geneviève Laroche as Julie
- Vincent Hoss-Desmarais as Eric

== Reception ==
Rotten Tomatoes, a review aggregator, reports that 83% of 24 surveyed critics gave the film a positive review; the average rating was 6.84/10. Metacritic rated it 63/100 based on five reviews. John DeFore of The Hollywood Reporter wrote, "Thomas Haden Church hits the exact balance of desperation and resignation demanded by the peculiar story". Bruce Demara of the Toronto Star wrote, "Despite Church's solid performance, Whitewash feels so leaden in its gravity, it borders on dull." Writing in The Globe and Mail, Geoff Fevre called it "a small but sparking gem on ice".

=== Awards ===
The film premiered at the 2013 Tribeca Film Festival, where Hoss-Desmarais won the award for Best New Narrative Director. The film went on to earn Hoss-Desmarais a nomination for Best Director at the 2013 Directors Guild of Canada awards. In January 2014, Hoss-Desmarais was awarded the Canadian Screen Award for the year's best feature by a first-time film director, and the film garnered two Canadian Screen Award nominations at the 2nd Canadian Screen Awards: Best Supporting Actor (Labrèche) and Best Original Screenplay (Hoss-Desmarais and Tulin).
