= Stephen Goldblatt =

South African-born British cinematographer

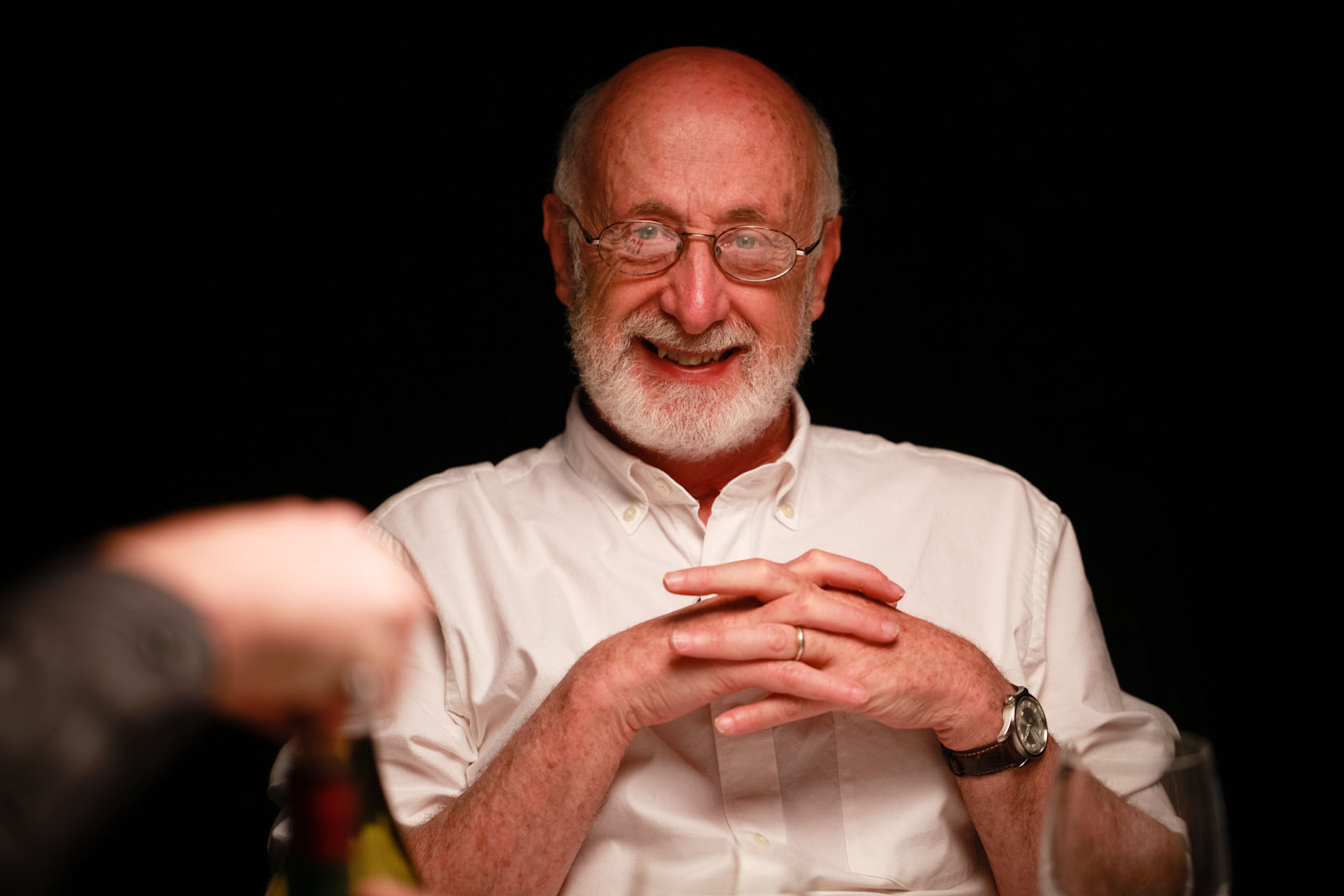
- Goldblatt in 2010
- Born: 29 April 1945 (age 81); Johannesburg, South Africa
- Education: Guildford School of Art; Royal College of Art Film School
- Occupation: Cinematograher
- Years active: 1968–2023

Stephen Goldblatt, A.S.C., B.S.C. (born 29 April 1945) is a South African-born British retired cinematographer.

== Early life ==
Goldblatt was born on 29 April 1945 in Johannesburg, South Africa, to a Jewish family. When he was seven years old, he and his family moved to London, where at the age of 18 he started working as a photojournalist for the London Sunday Times.

Goldblatt attended Guildford School of Art for photography, but later discovered his interest in film while working on a special assignment for Lion Films at Shepperton Studios. It was this interest that motivated him to attend London's Royal College of Art Film School.

== Career ==
Upon graduation, he went to work shooting documentaries and animation, much of it in 16mm. Among his assignments were two Disappearing World episodes for Granada TV.

Goldblatt began his career as a cameraman for documentaries and commercials. From 1972-75, he worked shooting TV commercials for directors such as Hugh Hudson, Alan Parker, Ridley Scott, and Brian Gibson. Goldblatt made the transition to feature films in 1979, when he shot Breaking Glass for Gibson, then in the following decade he worked with directors Peter Hyams on Outland (1981), Tony Scott on The Hunger (1983), Francis Coppola on The Cotton Club (1984), and Richard Donner on Lethal Weapon (1987) and Lethal Weapon 2 (1989).

In the 1990s, Goldblatt joined the Batman series with director Joel Schumacher and shot Batman Forever (1995) and Batman and Robin (1997). In the late 1990s, during a "film sabbatical" and after many years of only taking snapshots, Goldblatt built a darkroom and began to photograph his life and surroundings again. After his sabbatical Goldblatt worked with directors such as Mike Nichols on Angels in America (2003), Closer (2004) and Charlie Wilson's War (2007), Chris Columbus on Rent (2005) and Percy Jackson & the Olympians: The Lightning Thief (2010), Nora Ephron on Julie & Julia (2009), and most recently Tate Taylor on The Help (2011) and Get On Up (2014).

Stephen Goldblatt now lives in San Miguel de Allende, Mexico and has three grown children. When he is at home, Goldblatt enjoys tending to his pond and koi fish, gardening, playing his guitar, cooking, reading every day, and mastering the art of husbanding with his wife Deborah.

=== Photography ===
One of Stephen Goldblatt's most significant photo shoots was of the British band The Beatles in 1968, who at the time had just finished recording what came to be known as The White Album. The Beatles wanted some fresh publicity photos shot by an unknown photographer, with whom they planned to travel all over London to take random photos. One of Goldblatt's shots became a two-page spread in Life magazine, and a few others were used as album art on Beatles compilations.

In 2019, more than 2,000 unpublished photographs were found in an external storage unit at the Deutsche Kinemathek in Berlin. He had taken them as a still photographer in Nigeria in 1970 during the production of Things Fall Apart (1971/1974). An extensive research, digitisation and presentation project has since been able to generate a great deal of knowledge about the pre-Nollywood era of Nigerian film on this basis. In his essay ‘Why ‘Things Fall Apart’ is still a very relevant Black film till this day’, Mallam Mudi Yahaya describes the background.

== Filmography ==
=== Film ===
Year	Title	Director
1969	Forum (Note: Co-cinematographer with Tony Scott)	Mireille Dansereau
1972	Pass of Arms	Peter Elford
1980	Breaking Glass	Brian Gibson
1981	Outland	Peter Hyams
1982	The Return of the Soldier	Alan Bridges
1983	The Hunger	Tony Scott
1984	The Cotton Club	Francis Ford Coppola
1985	Young Sherlock Holmes	Barry Levinson
1987	Lethal Weapon	Richard Donner
1988	Everybody's All-American	Taylor Hackford
1989	Lethal Weapon 2	Richard Donner
1990	Joe Versus the Volcano	John Patrick Shanley
1991	For the Boys	Mark Rydell
1991	The Prince of Tides	Barbra Streisand
1992	Consenting Adults	Alan J. Pakula
1993	The Pelican Brief	Alan J. Pakula
1995	Batman Forever	Joel Schumacher
1996	Striptease	Andrew Bergman
1997	Batman & Robin	Joel Schumacher
1999	The Deep End of the Ocean	Ulu Grosbard
2004	Closer	Mike Nichols
2005	Rent	Chris Columbus
2007	Charlie Wilson's War	Mike Nichols
2009	Julie & Julia	Nora Ephron
2010	Percy Jackson & the Olympians: The Lightning Thief	Chris Columbus
2011	The Help	Tate Taylor
2014	Get On Up	Tate Taylor
2015	The Intern	Nancy Meyers
2017	Our Souls at Night	Ritesh Batra
2020	Ava	Tate Taylor
2020	Wild Mountain Thyme	John Patrick Shanley
2023	Red, White & Royal Blue	Matthew Lopez

=== Television ===
Miniseries

Year	Title	Director
1971-1972	The Flight of the Arctic 7	
2003	Angels in America	Mike Nichols

TV movies

Year	Title	Director	Note
2001	Conspiracy	Frank Pierson	
2002	Path to War	John Frankenheimer	With Nancy Schreiber

== Awards and nominations ==
Year	Award	Category	Title	Result
1991	Academy Awards	Best Cinematography	The Prince of Tides	Nominated
1995	Academy Awards	Best Cinematography	Batman Forever	Nominated
1991	American Society of Cinematographers	Outstanding Cinematography	The Prince of Tides	Nominated
1995	American Society of Cinematographers	Outstanding Cinematography	Batman Forever	Nominated
2003	American Society of Cinematographers	Outstanding Cinematography for Limited Series	Angels in America	Nominated
2023	American Society of Cinematographers	Lifetime Achievement Award		Won
2001	Primetime Emmy Awards	Outstanding Cinematography for a Limited or Anthology Series or Movie	Conspiracy	Nominated
2002	Primetime Emmy Awards	Outstanding Cinematography for a Limited or Anthology Series or Movie	Path to War	Nominated
2003	Primetime Emmy Awards	Outstanding Cinematography for a Limited or Anthology Series or Movie	Angels in America	Nominated
2007	Hollywood Film Awards	Cinematography of the Year		Nominated
2007	Camerimage	Lifetime Achievement Award		Won
2014	Camerimage	Golden Frog	Get On Up	Nominated
