= Anie Pascale =

Canadian actress

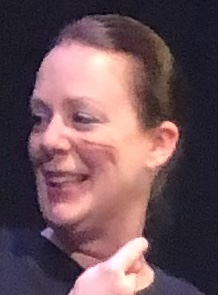
- Occupation: actress
- Years active: 2001-present

Anie Pascale is a Canadian actress. She was nominated for a 2009 Genie Award for Best Performance by an Actress in a Supporting Role for her role in Everything Is Fine (Tout est parfait). She has appeared in both television and film roles.

== Filmography ==
=== Film ===
Year	Title	Role	Notes
2001	Karmina 2	Échangiste	
2003	Le jour devant soi	Caroline (Adult)	Short film
2006	Bobby	Infirmière	
2008	Everything Is Fine (Tout est parfait)	Geneviève	
2008	Martyrs	La femme bourreau	
2010	L'anniversaire	Lucie	Short film
2010	Curling	Mireille	
2010	The Kate Logan Affair	Female Co-worker	
2012	Les 5 ans de Félix	Julie	Short film
2012	Deadfall	Tricia	
2013	Whitewash	Waitress	
2014	Ceci n'est pas un polar	Mme Daprato	
2015	Alice in the Attic	Diane	
2016	Boris Without Béatrice	Docteur Miller	
2016	Miséricorde	Patty	
2020	1805 A rue des Papillons	Annie	Short film
2020	You Will Remember Me (Tu te souviendras de moi)	Journaliste	

=== Television ===
Year	Title	Role	Notes
2003	Les aventures tumultueuses de Jack Carter	Prostituée	1 episode
2004-2017	L'auberge du chien noir	Sandra Bélanger	
2004	Les Bougon: C'est aussi ça la vie	Angélique	2 episodes
2005	Naked Josh	Marci	1 episode
2008	Les Boys	Assistante de Guy Laliberté	1 episode
2010, 2016	Mirador	Gabrielle	3 episodes
2013-2014	Unité 9	Paule Gauthier	5 episodes
2014	Mensonges	Me Catherine Francoeur	1 episode
2014-2015	La théorie du K.O.	Professeur Sylvie	5 episodes
2015	For Sarah	Enquêreure, Bérubé	5 episodes
2016	Les beaux malaises	Femme sèche	1 episode
2016	Legacy, a Kate McDougal Investigation	Lucy	3 episodes
2016-2017	Fatale-Station	Johanne	10 episodes
2019	Toute la vie	Marthe Desrosiers	1 episode
2020	Marika	Julie Blitz/Mégane Dutoit	4 episodes
2022	Alertes	Victoria Savard	5 episodes
2022	Aller simple	Anne-Renée Lanctôt	4 episodes
2023	Les yeux fermés	Lorraine Bédard	TV mini series
