= Amal (2007 film) =

- poster
- Directed by: Richie Mehta
- Written by: Richie Mehta; Shaun Mehta
- Produced by: Steven Bray
- Starring: Rupinder Nagra; Naseeruddin Shah; Seema Biswas; Koel Purie; Vik Sahay; Roshan Seth
- Cinematography: Mitchell Ness
- Edited by: Stuart A. McIntyre
- Music by: Dr. Shiva
- Distributed by: Seville Pictures
- Release dates: September 13, 2007 (Toronto International Film Festival); August 8, 2008 (Canada)
- Running time: 101 minutes
- Country: Canada
- Languages: English; Hindi
- Budget: $5 million

Amal (Hindi: अमल) is a 2007 Canadian drama film directed and written by Richie Mehta. Set in modern-day New Delhi, India, it tells the story of a poor autorickshaw driver, Amal Kumar.

The film was originally released as a short film in 2004, with the same lead actor but a different cast, before it was adapted and expanded into a feature film after three years.

== Plot ==
Amal Kumar (Rupinder Nagra) is an honest, punctual, hardworking sweet-natured autorickshaw driver who has two regular customers: the store merchant Pooja (Koel Purie) and a schoolboy who is the son of exacting lawyer Sapna Agarwal (Seema Biswas). While riding in Amal's autorickshaw, Pooja has her handbag snatched out of her hands by a beggar girl (Tanisha Chatterjee). Amal pursues the girl until she is hit by a car. Amal and Pooja take the girl to hospital. Amal visits the girl regularly, speaks to her doctor and reminds the nurses to take good care of her.

One day Amal offers his services to an old man, whose identity is revealed later in the film as local billionaire G.K. Jayaram (Naseeruddin Shah); Jayaram has been wandering the streets of New Delhi searching for an honest man. Jayaram asks Amal questions about his life, makes insulting comments about his driving skills, changes his destination, and finally pays the fare; he is surprised that Amal does not accept a three rupee tip.

Jayaram subsequently dies, leaving his entire estate to the one honest man he believes to have encountered – Amal. He dictates that his will is not to be read until Amal reports to Jayaram's lawyer, Sapna, who has no idea that Amal is her son's autorickshaw driver. If Amal is not found within a month, Jayaram's estate will be inherited by his family members. Sapna deploys Suresh (Roshan Seth), Jayaram's longtime companion, to find Amal, but Suresh and Jayaram's son Vivek hatch a plan to hinder the search in order to claim inheritance.

In the meantime, although Priya's condition improves, she is in need of surgery that would cost 50,000 rupees. Amal sells his autorickshaw to pay for the surgery, but Priya dies on the operating table. Amal then takes a janitor position at a local post office. Touched by Amal's kindness and self-sacrifice, Pooja uses some of the money she has been saving for her dowry to buy a carburetor, which she gives to Amal so that he can fix up an abandoned auto-rickshaw lying by his house.

Suresh finds Amal and witnesses his honesty and sweet nature first-hand. He is reluctant to notify Sapna, but finally does so the night before the deadline. When he informs Vivek that he is abandoning their original plan and is taking Amal to Sapna's the next day, Vivek attacks Suresh and chokes him to death.

The next morning, Sapna reads Suresh's notes and finds out that Amal is her son's autorickshaw driver. She brings Amal into the house to sign some papers. Amal, who is still unaware of the inheritance, opens G.K.'s letter and takes a long look at it. Sapna receives a phone call and asks Amal to wait in the living room; she is told that Suresh has died. Amal leaves the lawyer's house so as not to be late in meeting Pooja. Out on the sidewalk, he is approached by a homeless girl who asks him for a piece of paper to draw on. Amal hands her the letter and drives away.

The homeless girl approaches Sapna's son and tells him that the paper Amal has given her to draw on has writing on it and may be of some importance. Sapna's son replies that it would make no difference, as Amal cannot read. The movie ends with Amal picking up Pooja, the two smiling at each other, and a voiceover by G.K. saying that he could not imagine what the man who did not want three rupees would do with three hundred million rupees.

== Cast ==
- Rupinder Nagra as Amal Kumar
- Naseeruddin Shah as G.K. Jayaram
- Seema Biswas as Sapna Agarwal
- Koel Purie as Pooja Seth
- Vik Sahay as Vivek Jayaram
- Roshan Seth as Suresh
- Tanisha Chatterjee as Priya
- Siddhant Behl as Harish Jayaram
- Amardeep Jha as Radha Kumar
- Maya Mankotia as Simran Jayaram
- Dr. Shiva as Dr. Shiva
- Gurpreet Chana as the Tabla Guy
- Fenulla Jiwani as Poker Woman #2
- Ellora Patnaik as Casino Director
- Rajesh Tailang as Dhaba Owner

== Screening and reception ==
In 2007 the film was screened at the San Francisco International Asian American Film Festival, winning the Best Narrative Award. It was shown at the 2008 Whistler Film Festival, where Rupinder Nagra received an award for Best Actor and the film was named winner of the Audience Award.

Amal was nominated for six Genie Awards in 2009. The song "Rahi Nagufta" composed and sung in the film by Dr. Shiva, won a Genie for Best Original Song.
