= Craig Titley =

American screenwriter

Craig Titley is an American screenwriter. His work includes Cheaper by the Dozen, Scooby-Doo, and Percy Jackson & the Olympians: The Lightning Thief. He graduated from Mattoon High School, Eastern Illinois University, and University of Southern California with a master's degree. He got his Doctorate at Pacifica Graduate Institute.

== Filmography ==
=== Film ===
Year	Title	Writer	Producer	Notes
2001	Conspiracy Theory: Did We Land on the Moon?	Yes	Yes	Documentary; co-executive producer
2001	See Spot Run	Yes	No	
2002	Scooby-Doo	Yes	No	Story by
2003	Cheaper by the Dozen	Yes	No	Story by
2005	Cheaper by the Dozen 2	Yes	No	Characters by
2010	Percy Jackson & the Olympians: The Lightning Thief	Yes	No	

=== Television ===
Year	Title	Writer	Producer	Notes
2009-10	Star Wars: The Clone Wars	Yes	No	2 episodes
2011	The Cape	Yes	Yes	written 2 episodes; consulting producer
2014-20	Agents of S.H.I.E.L.D.	Yes	Yes	written 13 episodes; consulting- 2014-16, co-executive 2016-18 and executive producer 2019-20
