= Kimberly Laferriere =

Canadian actress

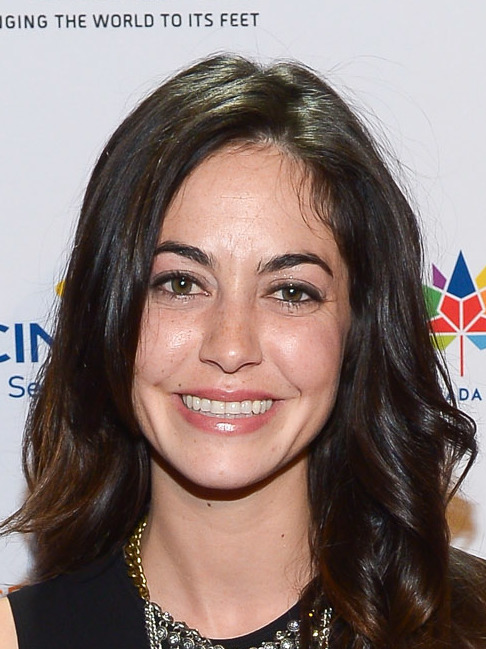
- Laferriere in February 2017
- Born: Kimberly-Anne Laferrière; November 3, 1988 (age 38); Montreal, Quebec, Canada
- Occupation: Actress
- Years active: 2000 – present

Kimberly-Anne Laferrière (born November 3, 1988) is a Canadian actress. A graduate of the Neighborhood Playhouse School of the Theatre in New York City and the Canadian Film Centre in Toronto, she has appeared on successful television series in both French and English in the United States and Canada. Her recent work includes the role of Natasha on the TVA drama series Fugueuse which was nominated for a Prix Gémeaux in 2018, as well as The CW crime drama series In The Dark, the CBC Television drama series 21 Thunder and the web series Féminin Féminin, co-created and directed by Chloé Robichaud.
