= Richie Mehta =

Canadian film director and writer

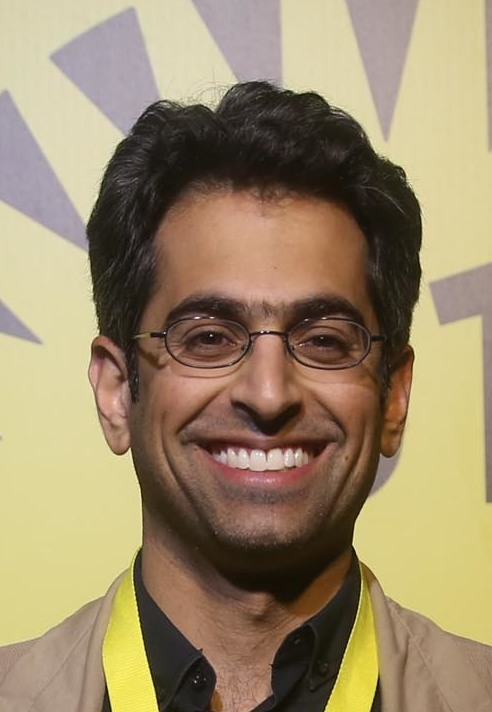
- Director Richie Mehta at the Miami International Film Festival
- Born: Mississauga, Ontario, Canada
- Education: University of Toronto/Sheridan College (HBA)
- Occupation: film director

Richie Mehta is a Canadian film director and writer. His first feature film, Amal, was released in 2008, and was nominated for Best Motion Picture and Best Director at the 29th Genie Awards. He created and directed season 1 of Netflix India's crime drama series Delhi Crime, which was based on the true and brutal 2012 Delhi gang rape case.

In 2013, Mehta released two films he wrote and directed - Siddharth (which premiered at the Venice Film Festival, before receiving over 25 International Awards); and I'll Follow You Down, a science fiction film starring Gillian Anderson and Rufus Sewell.

In October 2015, Mehta teamed up with Ridley Scott and Google, as the director of the documentary India in a Day, which premiered at the Toronto International Film Festival.

In March 2019, Mehta created, wrote, and directed all episodes of the drama series Delhi Crime, based on the 2012 Delhi gang rape case. The series was released on Netflix to rave reviews.

The series won the International Emmy Award for Best Drama Series (2020); and the Asian Academy Award for Best Drama Series (2019), and Best Direction (Fiction).

Mehta was born in Mississauga, Ontario and graduated with an Honours Bachelor of Arts in art history and cinema studies jointly from the University of Toronto and Sheridan College in 2001.

In 2026 he was announced as working on a television series adaptation of A Passage to India.

== Selected filmography ==
- Amal (2007)
- Siddharth (2013)
- I'll Follow You Down (2013)
- India in a Day (2016)
- Delhi Crime (2019)
- Poacher (2024)
- Phoolan (2026)
