= Yves Christian Fournier =

Film and television director

Yves-Christian Fournier is a Canadian film and television director and screenwriter, who won the Claude Jutra Award in 2008 for his debut film Everything Is Fine (Tout est parfait). Fournier also wrote and directed the short films Sunk, Les Emmerdeurs, Écoute-moi donc pas quand je te parle and Le Gibier, as well as episodes of the Télévision de Radio-Canada documentary series La Course destination monde.

His second feature film, Noir, was released in 2015.
