= Marco Pecota =

Marco Pecota is the co-publisher of Rue Morgue and owner of Veni Vidi Vici Motion Pictures. He was a Genie Award nominee at the 29th Genie Awards as a producer of the short film The Facts in the Case of Mister Hollow.
