= Borderline (2008 film) =

- Poster
- Directed by: Lyne Charlebois
- Written by: Lyne Charlebois; Marie-Sissi Labrèche
- Produced by: Roger Frappier; Luc Vandal
- Starring: Isabelle Blais; Jean-Hugues Anglade; Angèle Coutu
- Cinematography: Steve Asselin
- Edited by: Yvann Thibaudeau
- Music by: Benoît Jutras
- Production company: Max Films Productions
- Distributed by: TVA Films
- Release date: February 8, 2008
- Running time: 110 minutes
- Country: Canada
- Language: French

Borderline is a 2008 Canadian drama film directed by Lyne Charlebois and co-written with Marie-Sissi Labrèche, based on her novels Borderline and La Brèche.

== Synopsis ==
The film follows Kiki, a graduate student in Montreal living with borderline personality disorder. Through flashbacks, the viewer learns of her past: an unknown father and a mentally ill mother, who was later institutionalized. While she was raised by her grandmother, the effects of Kiki's family trauma show in her using physical intimacy to avoid emotional intimacy. With her grandmother being on the verge of death, Kiki tries to cope with how her actions have wrecked her relationships with friends, alongside the emptiness of her current affair with her thesis advisor. As she turns thirty, Kiki meets her most painful love: herself.

== Cast ==
- Isabelle Blais as Kiki (20 & 30 years old)
- Jean-Hugues Anglade as Tcheky
- Angèle Coutu as Mémé
- Sylvie Drapeau as Mère de Kiki / Kiki's Mother
- Laurence Carbonneau as Kiki (10 years old)
- Pierre-Luc Brillant as Mikael Robin
- Marie-Chantal Perron as Caroline
- Antoine Bertrand as Eric
- Hubert Proulx as Antoine
- Maxime Le Flaguais as Sébastien Vandal

== Production ==
"The striptease scene was the worst of the shoot for me, but I don't really remember it," said Isabelle Blais. "Because to dive, I had to go into an unconscious state. I didn't have to think."

== Awards ==
Genie Award – Adapted Screenplay; Prix Jutra – Director, Best Actress (Blais), Best Supporting Actress (Coutu), Editing
