= Dr. Shiva =

Dr. Shiva is the stage name of Ramier Siva-Nandan, an Indo-Canadian musician and actor based in Mississauga, Ontario.

== Early life ==
Born and raised in India, Siva-Nandan moved to Canada in 1995.

== Career ==
Dr. Shiva acted in the film Amal. He also composed music for the film, including the song "Rahi Nagufta", for which he won a Genie Award for Best Original Song in 2009.

He provided music and vocals for Stephen Lategan's short film Coxwell & Gerrard, which won a Special Jury Remy Award at Worldfest Houston.
