= I'll Follow You Down =

- Directed by: Richie Mehta
- Written by: Richie Mehta
- Produced by: Lee Kim
- Starring: Haley Joel Osment; Gillian Anderson; Rufus Sewell; Victor Garber
- Cinematography: Tico Poulakakis
- Edited by: Stuart A. McIntyre
- Music by: Andrew Lockington
- Distributed by: Entertainment One
- Release dates: July 28, 2013 (Fantasia International Film Festival); June 20, 2014
- Running time: 93 minutes
- Country: Canada
- Language: English

I'll Follow You Down is a 2013 Canadian techno-thriller film written and directed by Richie Mehta. Outside the United States and Canada, the film was released as Continuum.

== Plot ==
In 2000, Gabe, a professor from Toronto goes to Princeton, New Jersey, for a conference but does not return. He is eventually presumed dead, devastating his wife Marika and his young son Erol. Twelve years later, Erol talks with his grandfather Sal, who suggests that Gabe's disappearance might have been the result of a scientific experiment involving time travel. Erol is determined to find out the truth.

Erol is a mathematical genius and solves the equations necessary to recreate the time travel machine his father had built to go back in time to 1946. As he works with Sal on this machine and the math and physics of it, Erol's girlfriend, Grace, becomes pregnant and makes him doubt the necessity of this endeavor. However, when Grace has a miscarriage and Marika commits suicide (as a result of her grief and confusion over her husband's unexplained failure to return), Erol realizes that the current timeline is the direct result of his father having left: none of this would have happened if Gabe had come home, so this timeline is a dead-end, and has to be corrected. With renewed vigor, Erol finishes the time machine. He uses it to go back to 1946 and finds Gabe, who is looking for Albert Einstein (because he had finished some work that Einstein had started). Erol reveals his identity to his father and explains the chain of events that had led him to come find him. He tells Gabe to go back home and give his family the life they deserve, and to remember that he, Erol, is what he is because of his father's mistake. Knowing Gabe's mind, Erol realizes this will not be enough to persuade him to return home. So he shoots himself, dying instantly. As he had intended, this burns the message into Gabe's mind that he has to go back and prevent all of this from happening, which he does.

== Cast ==
- Gillian Anderson as Marika
- Haley Joel Osment as Erol
- Rufus Sewell as Gabe
- Victor Garber as Sal
- John Paul Ruttan as Young Erol
- Kiara Glasco as Young Gracie
- Susanna Fournier as Grace

== Reception ==
On the review aggregator website Rotten Tomatoes, 33% of 9 critics' reviews are positive, with an average rating of 5.1/10.
