= Music of Percy Jackson and the Olympians =

Soundtracks to the television series

The music for the American fantasy adventure television series Percy Jackson and the Olympians featured original themes written and composed by Bear McCreary and original score by Sparks & Shadows. The score emphasizes traditional and classic orchestration of the ancient periods while also utilizing modern and contemporary instrumentation. The series also featured pop songs to familiarize with the contemporary audiences.

Hollywood Records published two soundtracks for McCreary's score in conjunction with the season premiere. The first season's soundtrack was released in December 2023, while the second season's soundtrack released in December 2025. The score received positive critical response and McCreary won two Children's and Family Emmy Awards for his work.

== Composition ==
Bear McCreary wrote the original score for Percy Jackson and the Olympians, renewing his collaboration with creator Jonathan E. Steinberg and screenwriter Dan Shotz, having previously worked with them in the series Human Target, Black Sails and See. McCreary considered the show to be a "visionary" project considering the source material of Rick Riordan's novels and felt that the score he would created would be a "confident voice in the storytelling". McCreary closely associated with the members of his co-founded music company Sparks & Shadows to envision a "sweeping, lyrical and thematically driven" score to support Steinberg's vision. McCreary had been credited for writing the themes while Sparks & Shadows received credits for composing and developing the entire score.During their earliest creative meetings with Steinberg, Shotz, Riordan and a young Sparks & Shadows composer Brian Claeys, McCreary discussed for hours regarding the tone of the score, the musical languages they want to employ. McCreary said that he was influenced by the large scale orchestral scores for fantasy films such as Star Wars and Harry Potter (John Williams), Poltergeist (Jerry Goldsmith), Willow (James Horner), or Conan the Barbarian (Basil Poledouris) and wanted to achieve that kind of music, that was heavily reliant on strong character themes that begins with a classic, orchestral sound. During their early discussions, McCreary focused on writing a separate end credits suites, inspired by Williams and Goldsmith's scores and something that was rare in television. The series would feature a separate end credits suite by merging the main theme.

== Featured music ==
=== Season 1 ===
Besides the original score, the season also featured use of pre-existed popular musical numbers in order to connect with the contemporary audiences. The first episode, "I Accidentally Vaporize My Pre-Algebra Teacher" featured the contemporary pop number "Logical" (2023) by Olivia Rodrigo. The third episode "We Visit The Garden Gnome Emporium" featured the song "Arthur's Theme (Best That You Can Do)" (1981) by Christopher Cross. The fifth episode, "A God Buys Us Cheeseburgers" featured the song "What Is Love" (1993) by Haddaway. "We Take a Zebra to Vegas" featured two songs—the pop song "Levitating" by Dua Lipa featuring DaBaby, is played at the Lotus Hotel and Casino, and "I Ran (So Far Away)" (1982) by the new wave and synth pop band A Flock of Seagulls was also played. The seventh episode, "We Find Out the Truth, Sort Of" featured a cover of the McGuire Sisters' "Sugar Time" performed by the Fun Machine.

=== Season 2 ===
The first three episodes incorporated the contemporary musical numbers. In "I Play Dodgeball with Cannibals", three songs were featured—"Good Times Roll" (1979) by the Cars, "Fight the Power" (1989) by Public Enemy and "You Keep Me Hangin' On" (1996) by the Supremes. In the second episode, "Demon Pigeons Attack", the song "Emotions" (1991) by Mariah Carey is played when Percy and Annabeth drive away the Stymphalian birds as they are sensitive to high pitched sounds. "We Board the Princess Andromeda" featured two songs—"Better" by Kalo and "Cake by the Ocean" (2015) by DNCE.

=== Season 3 ===
In "My Rescue Operation Goes Very Wrong", six songs were featured—"Jingle Bells" (2019) by Ruby Wood, Stacey Dowsdeswell, Derek Moody, and Heather Lucy Mcclelland, "The Tracks of My Tears" (1965) by Smokey Robinson and the Miracles, "One More Time (Hotblood Remix)" (2017) by Daft Punk, "She's Always a Woman" (1977) by Billy Joel, "Until I Found You (Em Beihold Version)" (2022) by Stephen Sanchez and Em Beihold, and "Last First Kiss" (2026) by Hana Effron. In "An Old Dead Friend Comes To Visit", two songs were featured—"Eye of the Tiger" (1982) by Survivor and "Walking on Sunshine" (1985) by Katrina and the Waves.

== Albums ==
=== Season 1 ===
Percy Jackson and the Olympians

Soundtrack album by Bear McCreary and Sparks & Shadows
- Released: December 22, 2023
- Genre: Soundtrack
- Length: 1:03:24
- Label: Hollywood

Bear McCreary soundtrack chronology
The Last Voyage of the Demeter (2023)	Percy Jackson and the Olympians (2023)	Halo season 2 (2024)

Percy Jackson and the Olympians (Original Soundtrack) is the soundtrack consisting of the original themes written by McCreary and composed by Sparks & Shadows as per the soundtrack album credits. Hollywood Records published the 16-track soundtrack album on December 22, 2023, three days after the first episode's premiere.

==== Track listing ====
No.	Title	Writer(s)	Length
1.	"Percy Jackson and the Olympians"	Bear McCreary	5:11
2.	"Perseus"	McCreary; Sparks & Shadows	4:22
3.	"The Minotaur"	McCreary; Sparks & Shadows	4:53
4.	"Camp Half-Blood"	McCreary; Sparks & Shadows	6:44
5.	"Aunty Em"	McCreary; Sparks & Shadows	2:44
6.	"The Mother of Monsters"	McCreary; Sparks & Shadows	2:57
7.	"Chimera"	McCreary; Sparks & Shadows	2:52
8.	"The Tunnel of Love"	McCreary; Sparks & Shadows	3:02
9.	"A Zebra in Vegas"	McCreary; Sparks & Shadows	3:10
10.	"Spirit of the Sea"	McCreary; Sparks & Shadows	3:54
11.	"The Fields of Asphodel"	McCreary; Sparks & Shadows	2:21
12.	"Lord of the Dead"	McCreary; Sparks & Shadows	2:58
13.	"Poseidon"	McCreary; Sparks & Shadows	5:13
14.	"Olympus"	McCreary; Sparks & Shadows	3:52
15.	"The Lightning Thief"	McCreary; Sparks & Shadows	3:38
16.	"The Sea Does Not Like to Be Restrained"	McCreary; Sparks & Shadows	5:33
Total length:			1:03:24

=== Season 2 ===
Percy Jackson and the Olympians: Season 2

Soundtrack album by Bear McCreary and Sparks & Shadows
- Released: December 19, 2025
- Genre: Soundtrack
- Length: 1:11:41
- Label: Hollywood

Bear McCreary soundtrack chronology
Outlander: Blood of My Blood (2025)	Percy Jackson and the Olympians: Season 2 (2025)	God of War Sons of Sparta (2026)

Percy Jackson and the Olympians: Season 2 (Original Soundtrack) featured 20 tracks of the original score with main themes written by McCreary and the entire score composed by Sparks & Shadows. Hollywood Records published the album on December 19, 2025, two days after the second episode being premiered.

==== Track listing ====
No.	Title	Writer(s)	Length
1.	"Percy Jackson and the Olympians (Season 2 Theme)"	Bear McCreary	2:18
2.	"The Quest for Pan"	McCreary; Sparks & Shadows	3:10
3.	"The Gray Sisters and King Tantalus"	McCreary; Sparks & Shadows	3:25
4.	"Laistrygonians"	McCreary; Sparks & Shadows	2:21
5.	"Tyson"	McCreary; Sparks & Shadows	2:58
6.	"The Chariot Race"	McCreary; Sparks & Shadows	5:49
7.	"The Great Prophecy"	McCreary; Sparks & Shadows	2:34
8.	"Clarisse and the Ironclad"	McCreary; Sparks & Shadows	2:54
9.	"No Rest for the Dead"	McCreary; Sparks & Shadows	2:00
10.	"The Sea of Monsters"	McCreary; Sparks & Shadows	4:24
11.	"C.C.'s Island Resort and Spa"	McCreary; Sparks & Shadows	3:40
12.	"The Sirens (feat. Dayna Ambrosio)"	McCreary; Sparks & Shadows	3:43
13.	"Polyphemus and The Golden Fleece"	McCreary; Sparks & Shadows	5:40
14.	"Fatal Flaw"	McCreary; Sparks & Shadows	3:03
15.	"The Princess Andromeda"	McCreary; Sparks & Shadows	2:33
16.	"Voice of Kronos"	McCreary; Sparks & Shadows	2:57
17.	"The Battle for Half-Blood Hill"	McCreary; Sparks & Shadows	3:27
18.	"Brace Yourself"	McCreary; Sparks & Shadows	3:40
19.	"What Really Happened"	McCreary; Sparks & Shadows	5:14
20.	"Percy Jackson and the Olympians – Season 2 Extended Theme"	McCreary	5:42
Total length:			1:11:41

=== Season 3 ===
Percy Jackson and the Olympians: Season 3

Soundtrack album by Bear McCreary and Dayna Ambrosio
- Released: December 11, 2026
- Genre: Soundtrack
- Length: 1:06:12
- Label: Hollywood

Bear McCreary soundtrack chronology
The Lord of the Rings: The Rings of Power (Season Three) (2026)	Percy Jackson and the Olympians: Season 3

Percy Jackson and the Olympians: Season 3 (Original Soundtrack) featured 20 tracks of the original score with main themes written by McCreary and the entire score composed by McCreary and Dayna Ambrosio. Hollywood Records is set to publish the album on December 11, 2026, on the day of the season finale.

==== Track listing ====
No.	Title	Writer(s)	Length
1.	"Percy Jackson and the Olympians (Season 3 Theme)"	Bear McCreary	2:14
2.	"Artemis Goddess of the Hunt"	McCreary; Dayna Ambrosio	3:03
3.	"Westover Hall"	McCreary; Ambrosio	2:51
4.	"Bessie"	McCreary; Ambrosio	2:16
5.	"Atlas"	McCreary; Ambrosio	2:05
6.	"Five Shall Go West"	McCreary; Ambrosio	2:57
7.	"The Spartoi"	McCreary; Ambrosio	2:08
8.	"The Battle of Air and Space"	McCreary; Ambrosio	3:42
9.	"Aphrodite"	McCreary; Ambrosio	2:49
10.	"Talos"	McCreary; Ambrosio	4:22
11.	"The Di Angelos"	McCreary; Ambrosio	5:22
12.	"Dam Fight"	McCreary; Ambrosio	4:00
13.	"Guardian of the Golden Apples"	McCreary; Ambrosio	3:26
14.	"Hidden Passageways"	McCreary; Ambrosio	1:46
15.	"The Titan’s Curse"	McCreary; Ambrosio	4:39
16.	"Forever in the Stars"	McCreary; Ambrosio	4:10
17.	"The Vote"	McCreary; Ambrosio	4:51
18.	"What Olympus Is About"	McCreary; Ambrosio	3:50
19.	"The Promise"	McCreary; Ambrosio	3:26
20.	"Percy Jackson and the Olympians (Lost in the Land Without Rain)"	McCreary	2:15
Total length:			1:06:12

== Accolades ==
Year	Award	Category	Recipient(s) and nominee(s)	Result	Ref.
2025	Children's and Family Emmy Awards	Outstanding Music Direction and Composition for a Live Action Program	Bear McCreary (Note: Additional nominees: Omer Ben-Zvi, Brian Claeys, Alexandre Côté, Bailey Gordon, Jesse Hartov, and Kelsey Woods (composers).)	Won	
2023	Hollywood Music in Media Awards	Main Title Theme – TV Show/Limited Series	Bear McCreary	Nominated	
