= Percy Jackson & the Olympians: The Lightning Thief =

2010 film by Chris Columbus

- Theatrical release poster
- Directed by: Chris Columbus
- Screenplay by: Craig Titley
- Based on: The Lightning Thief by Rick Riordan
- Produced by: Karen Rosenfelt; Chris Columbus; Michael Barnathan; Mark Radcliffe
- Starring: Logan Lerman; Brandon T. Jackson; Alexandra Daddario; Sean Bean; Pierce Brosnan; Steve Coogan; Rosario Dawson; Catherine Keener; Kevin McKidd; Joe Pantoliano; Uma Thurman
- Cinematography: Stephen Goldblatt
- Edited by: Peter Honess
- Music by: Christophe Beck
- Production companies: Fox 2000 Pictures; Dune Entertainment; 1492 Pictures; Sunswept Entertainment
- Distributed by: 20th Century Fox
- Release dates: February 2, 2010 (Canada); February 12, 2010 (United States)
- Running time: 119 minutes
- Countries: United Kingdom; United States
- Language: English
- Budget: $95 million
- Box office: $226.4 million

Percy Jackson & the Olympians: The Lightning Thief (also known as Percy Jackson and the Lightning Thief) is a 2010 fantasy film directed by Chris Columbus and written by Craig Titley, based on the 2005 novel by Rick Riordan. It is the first installment of the Percy Jackson film series. Logan Lerman stars as the title character, alongside Brandon T. Jackson, Alexandra Daddario, Jake Abel, Sean Bean, Pierce Brosnan, Steve Coogan, Rosario Dawson, Catherine Keener, Kevin McKidd, Joe Pantoliano, and Uma Thurman.

In 2004, 20th Century Fox acquired the film rights to the book series. In 2007, Chris Columbus was hired to direct. Filming began in April 2009 in Vancouver. Some shots were filmed in Tennessee and Las Vegas, and some exterior scenes were shot in New York.

Percy Jackson & the Olympians: The Lightning Thief was released theatrically in the United States on February 12, 2010, by 20th Century Fox. It received mixed reviews from critics, with praise for the action sequences and the performances of Lerman and Jackson, but criticism for its script and unfaithfulness to the source material. The film grossed $226.4 million worldwide against a production budget of $95 million. It was released on June 29, 2010, on DVD and Blu-ray Disc. A video game based on the film was released for Nintendo DS on February 11, 2010. A sequel, Percy Jackson: Sea of Monsters, was released on August 7, 2013.

== Plot ==
Zeus accuses Poseidon's demigod son, Percy Jackson, of having stolen his master lightning bolt. Poseidon defends Percy, saying he is unaware of his heritage, but Zeus declares that war will be waged if the lightning bolt is not returned to Mount Olympus before midnight of the Summer Solstice.

Twelve year old Percy, who lives with his mother, Sally, and her abusive boyfriend Gabe, struggles with dyslexia and ADHD. On a school visit to the Metropolitan Museum of Art, Percy is attacked by Alecto, who sheds her disguise as his substitute teacher and demands the bolt. Percy's best friend Grover Underwood and his Latin teacher, Mr. Brunner, fend off Alecto. Mr. Brunner gives Percy a pen and instructs Grover to take him and Sally to Camp Half-Blood—a secret sanctuary for demigod children.

On the way there, the Minotaur attacks them and seemingly kills Sally. Percy discovers the pen is a magical sword, and uses it to fight the Minotaur, killing it before passing out. Waking up three days later, Percy learns he is Poseidon's son, Grover is a satyr and Percy's protector, and Mr. Brunner is Chiron, a centaur. His academic struggles were due to his latent demigod powers. He also possesses hydrokinesis and healing powers. While touring Camp Half-Blood, Percy meets Annabeth Chase, Athena's daughter, and the camp's leader Luke Castellan, Hermes's son.

Percy is visited by his uncle Hades's apparition, who reveals that the Minotaur abducted Sally to the Underworld to trade for the bolt. Defying Chiron's orders, Percy sets out for the Underworld with Grover and Annabeth. Luke gives Percy a map with the location of three green pearls belonging to Hades' wife, Persephone, which will allow them to escape the Underworld. Luke also gives him a pair of flying winged shoes and his favorite shield.

At a New Jersey garden center, with help from Grover and Annabeth, Percy decapitates Medusa and takes the first pearl. At the Parthenon in Nashville, Percy uses the shoes to retrieve the second pearl from the crown of the statue of Athena, and Grover uses Medusa's head to kill a Hydra guarding it. They track the final pearl to the Lotus Hotel and Casino in Las Vegas. They fall under the spell of the Lotus eaters but with Poseidon's guidance, Percy breaks the spell and escapes with Grover and Annabeth. The trio has only one day left to return the lightning bolt to Zeus.

They arrive in Hollywood where the entrance to the Underworld is. There, Hades finds the bolt hidden inside Luke's shield, revealing that Luke is the thief. Hades tries to kill them, but Persephone turns on him in retaliation for imprisoning her. She frees Sally and gives Percy the bolt. With only three pearls, Grover volunteers to stay in the Underworld.

The three teleport to the Empire State Building, which houses the entrance to Olympus. Before entering, Luke ambushes them. Luke reveals that he stole the bolt to demolish Olympus and establish the demigods as Olympus' new rulers. Percy and Luke battle across Manhattan, ending in Luke's defeat. Percy returns the bolt to Zeus and reconciles with his father. Percy reunites with Grover and Annabeth at Camp Half-Blood.

Later, Sally kicks Gabe out of their apartment, and Gabe, ignoring Percy's written warning not to open the fridge, breaks it open, and is turned into stone by Medusa's head.

== Cast ==
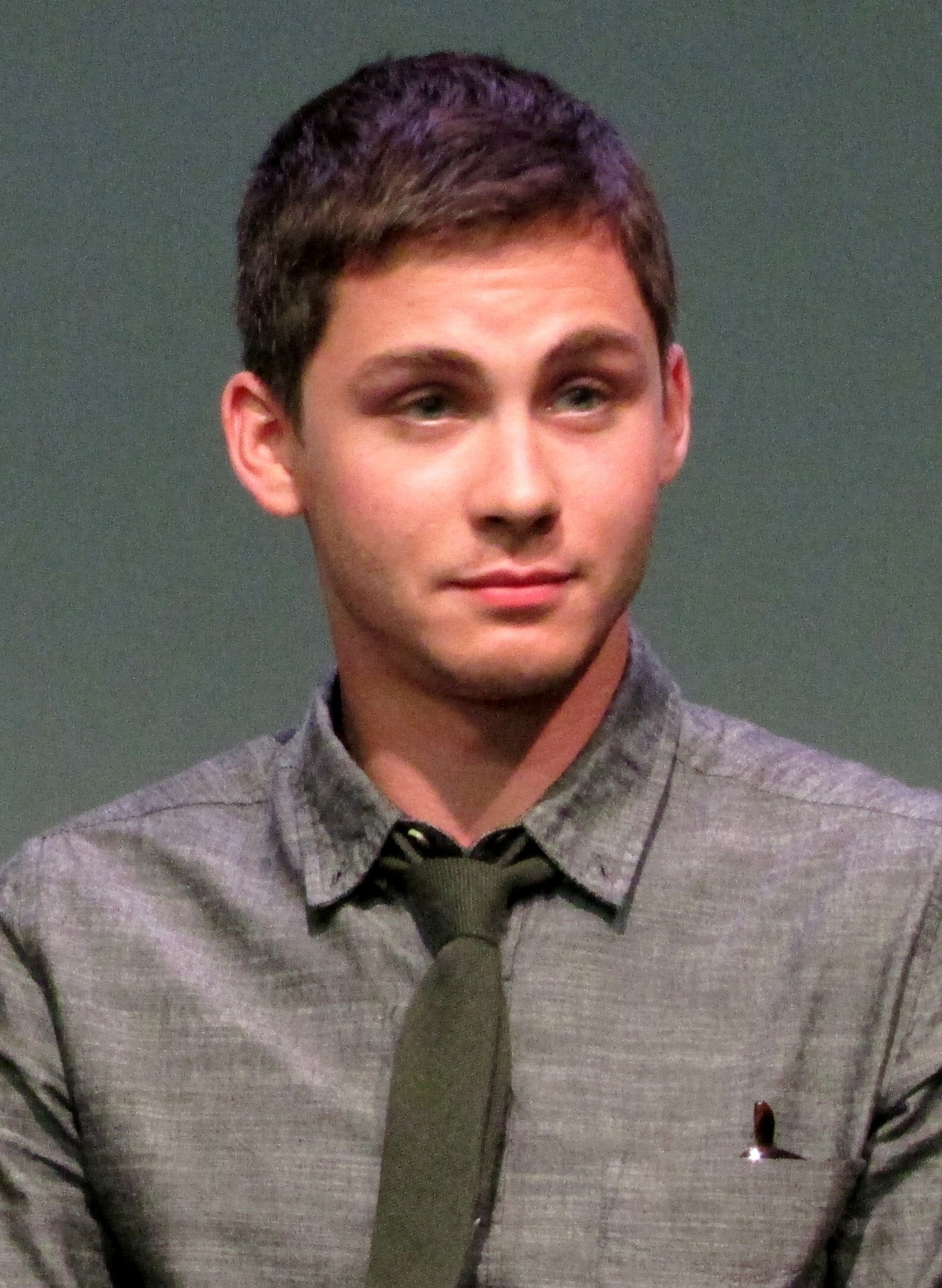
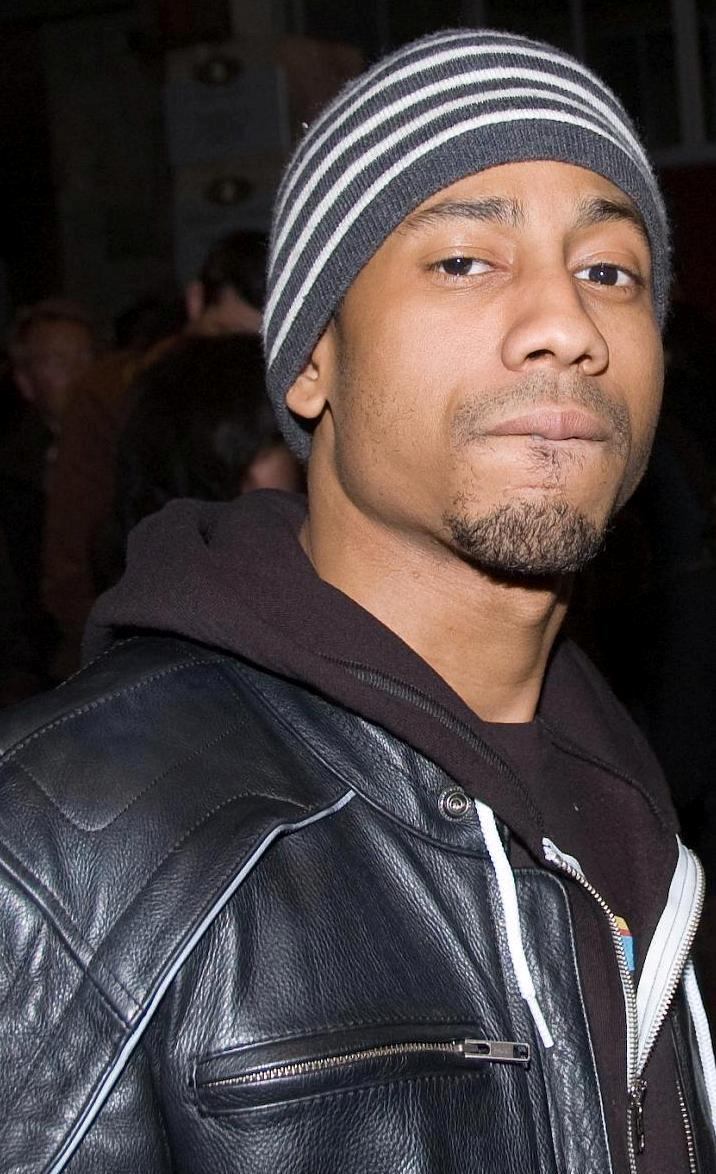
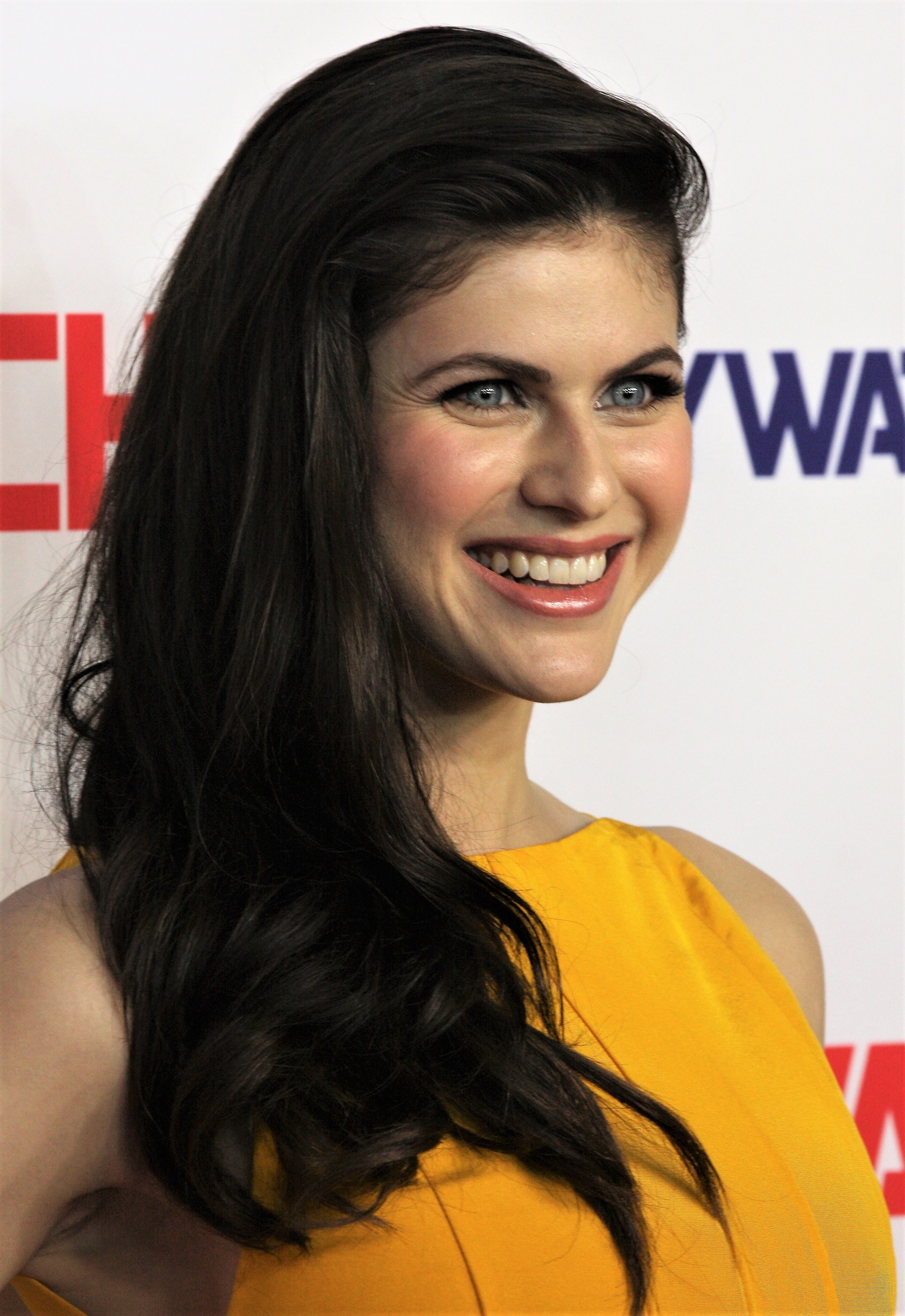
Logan Lerman plays the titular character, while Brandon T. Jackson and Alexandra Daddario plays Grover Underwood and Annabeth Chase, respectively.
- Logan Lerman as Percy Jackson, the demigod son of Poseidon
- Brandon T. Jackson as Grover Underwood, Percy's best friend and protector, a satyr
- Alexandra Daddario as Annabeth Chase, the demigod daughter of Athena
- Jake Abel as Luke Castellan, the demigod son of Hermes
- Sean Bean as Zeus, Percy's uncle, god of the sky, thunder, lightning, king of the twelve gods of Mount Olympus and brother of Poseidon and Hades
- Pierce Brosnan as Mr. Brunner/Chiron, a centaur who is a high school teacher and also trains heroes at Camp Half-Blood, the immortal son of Kronos and brother of Zeus, Poseidon, Hades, Demeter, and Hera
- Steve Coogan as Hades, Percy's uncle, god of the Underworld, the dead, and riches
- Rosario Dawson as Persephone, goddess of springtime, wife of Hades and admirer of Grover
- Melina Kanakaredes as Athena, Annabeth's mother, goddess of crafts, domestic arts, strategic warfare, peace and wisdom
- Catherine Keener as Sally Jackson, Poseidon's lover and Percy's mother
- Kevin McKidd as Poseidon, Percy's father, god of the seas, earthquakes, and horses
- Joe Pantoliano as Gabe Ugliano, Percy's abusive stepfather
- Uma Thurman as Medusa, a gorgon cursed by Athena
- Dylan Neal as Hermes, Luke's father, god of trade, thieves, travelers, sports, athletes, and messenger of the gods of Mount Olympus
- Erica Cerra as Hera, goddess of birth, family, marriage, women and queen of the twelve gods of Mount Olympus, sister and wife of Zeus
- Stefanie von Pfetten as Demeter, goddess of agriculture, fertility, and the harvest, sister of Zeus and mother of Persephone
- Dimitri Lekkos as Apollo, god of the sun, light, knowledge, healing, plague and darkness, the arts, music, poetry, prophecy, archery, and twin brother of Artemis
- Ona Grauer as Artemis, goddess of the hunt, virginity, the moon, and all animals, and twin sister of Apollo
- Serinda Swan as Aphrodite, goddess of love, beauty, wife of Hephaestus and lover of Ares
- Conrad Coates as Hephaestus, god of fire, forge, blacksmiths, craftsmen and husband of Aphrodite
- Ray Winstone as Ares, god of war, lover of Aphrodite (uncredited)
- Luke Camilleri as Dionysus, god of wine, celebrations, ecstasy, and theatre
- Maria Olsen as Mrs. Dodds/Alecto, a Fury, servant to Hades
- Julian Richings as Charon, ferryman of the River Styx, servant to Hades

== Production ==
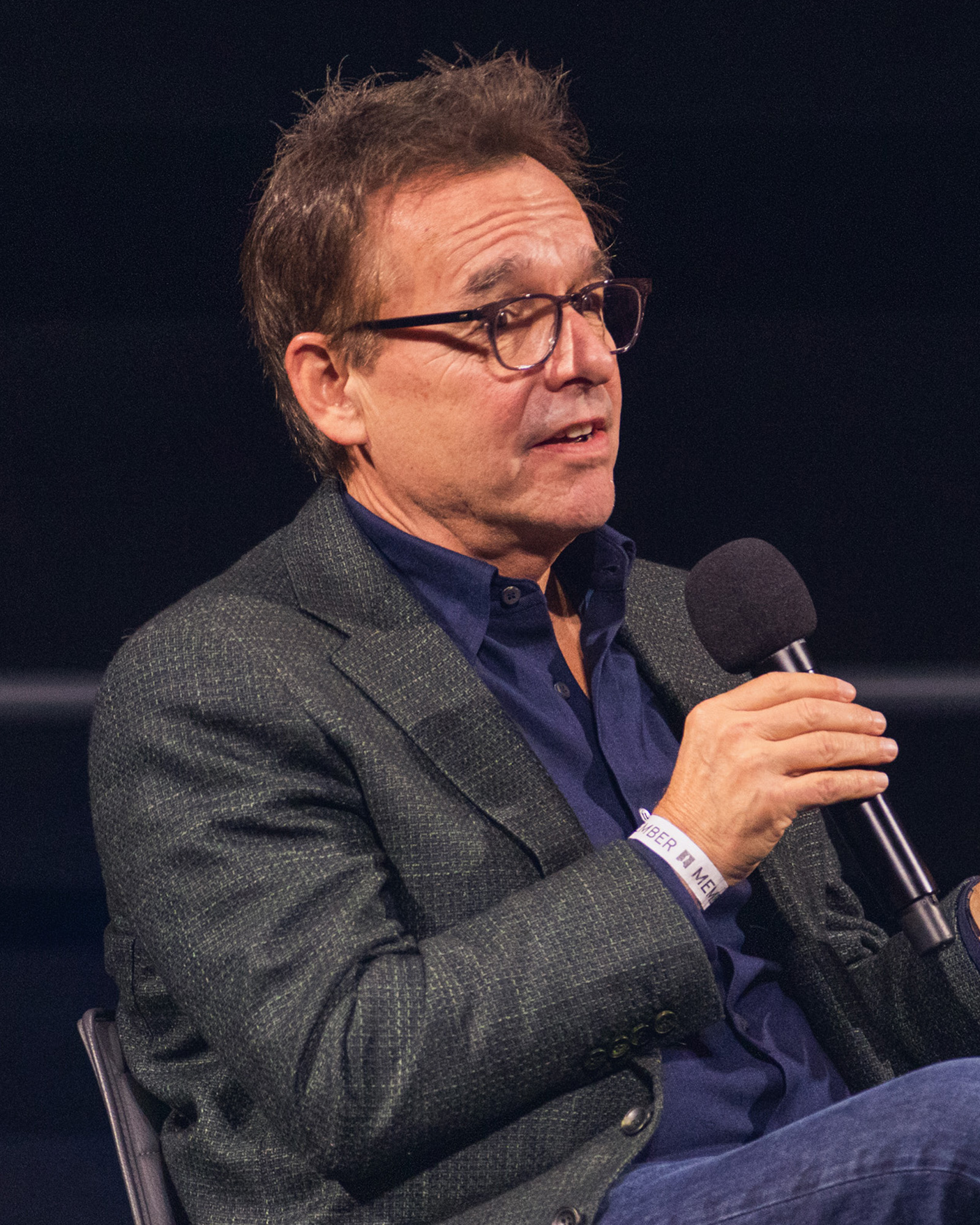
Chris Columbus is the film's director and producer.

In June 2004, 20th Century Fox acquired the film rights to the book. In April 2007, Chris Columbus was hired to direct. Filming began in April 2009 in Vancouver, and Mammoth Studios in Burnaby was selected to be the studio. Portions of the film were shot at the Parthenon in Nashville, Tennessee, that has a full-scale replica of the original Parthenon in Athens. The Lotus Casino sequence was filmed at The Westin Bayshore in Vancouver in June 2009, and additional scenes of Percy, Grover and Annabeth driving to and from the casino were shot on the Las Vegas Strip and in front of the Fremont Street Experience. Filming wrapped up on the morning of July 25, 2009, in Mission, British Columbia. Additional exterior scenes were filmed on location in Brooklyn, New York during the first week of August 2009. Digital intermediate work began in San Francisco in November 2009. Christophe Beck composed the score. Columbus has stated that the cast was chosen specifically with sequels in mind. "I think with Percy Jackson it was a matter of finding the right cast to fit into these roles, sort of the perfect cast for these roles, because hopefully, God willing, we will go on to do other Percy Jackson films and you want the cast to grow with their characters".

During production, Riordan was disappointed with the changes made to the story and warned the studio that it would likely alienate the readers of the book series that it was depending on to buy tickets. In two emails commenting at length on a draft of the script that he posted to his blog in 2018, he specifically warned the studio that trying to make the story more attractive to a teenage audience by aging the characters and including some profanity in the script might move a significant portion of the books' readers to leave the theater in disgust long before the movie ended. He also felt the introduction of Persephone's pearls as a plot device made no sense, having no basis in mythology and distracting Percy from his goal of recovering the stolen lightning bolt.

== Reception ==
=== Box office ===
The film opened on February 12, 2010, in 3,356 theaters; its opening weekend box-office results totaled $31.2 million in the U.S., finishing at #3 below The Wolfman, which opened at #2 with $31.5 million and below Valentine's Day, which opened at #1 with $56.3 million. The film had a strong opening weekend for its genre, posting the highest opening weekend for a fantasy film not from the Harry Potter, Chronicles of Narnia, or Lord of the Rings series. As of September 14, 2010, it grossed a total of $88.8 million in the U.S. and Canada with $137.7 million elsewhere in the world, bringing it to $226.5 million.

=== Critical response ===
On Rotten Tomatoes the film has an approval rating of 48% based on reviews from 150 critics, with an average score of 5.30/10. The site's consensus reads: "Though it may seem like just another Harry Potter knockoff, Percy Jackson benefits from a strong supporting cast, a speedy plot, and plenty of fun with Greek mythology." On Metacritic it has a score of 47 out of 100, based on 31 reviews, indicating "mixed or average reviews". Audiences polled by CinemaScore gave the film a grade B+ on a scale from A+ to F.

Kenneth Turan of the Los Angeles Times described the film as "standard Hollywood product... unadventurous and uninteresting". The reviewer for The Washington Post thought "the movie suffers by taking itself a little too seriously. It's not just that it's a lot less funny than the book. It's also a lot less fun". On BBC Radio 5, Mark Kermode criticized the similarity of the film to director Chris Columbus's Harry Potter films, likening it to a Harry Potter parody book and dubbing it Benjamin Sniddlegrass and the Cauldron of Penguins. This comment later sparked a satirical fan creation with precisely that title, narrated by Stephen Fry.

==== Rick Riordan's response ====
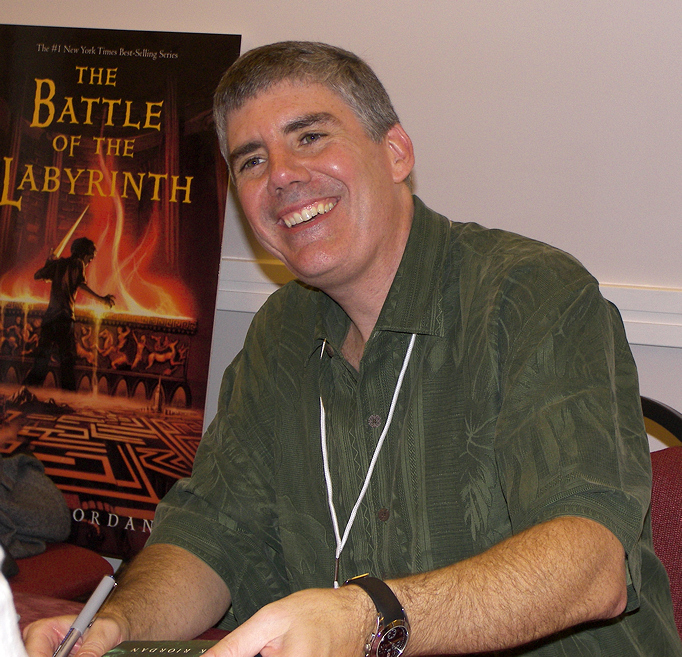
Author Rick Riordan expressed strong dislike for the film, criticizing its deviations and unfaithfulness to the source material.

The author, Rick Riordan, publicly criticized the final script. He revealed email recommendations for script changes with names redacted. Regarding future support for a reboot, Riordan said, "In the future, if some project actually does get underway, I may not be able to comment on it for contractual reasons, but you can tell how I'm feeling about it by what I do or don't say. Am I talking about it? Promoting it? Sharing cool things? I am probably happy. Am I completely ignoring it and never mentioning it on social media? Yeah . . . that's probably not a good sign. For instance, check out my website, rickriordan.com. Do you see any indication there that the Percy Jackson movies ever existed? No. No, you do not." He also shared in the same email "The script as a whole is terrible. I don't simply mean that it deviates from the book, though certainly it does that to point of being almost unrecognizable as the same story. Fans of the books will be angry and disappointed."

==== Chris Columbus' response ====
In a 2025 interview, Chris Columbus said that after the movie came out, he realized that he "was alienating a good part of the audience who loved these books." He admitted that he went in thinking "I like the books, they're fine, but I think I can make them better. Huge mistake. I felt bad about that because I changed certain elements of the books because I thought it would be more interesting to me as a filmmaker."

=== Accolades ===
Award	Category	Recipients	Result	References
2010 MTV Movie Awards	Breakthrough Performance	Logan Lerman	Nominated	
2010 MTV Movie Awards	Best Fight	Logan Lerman vs. Jake Abel	Nominated	
Teen Choice Awards 2010	Choice Movie Actress: Fantasy	Rosario Dawson	Nominated	
Teen Choice Awards 2010	Choice: Breakout Female	Alexandra Daddario	Nominated	
Teen Choice Awards 2010	Choice: Breakout Male	Logan Lerman	Nominated	
Teen Choice Awards 2010	Choice: Fight	Logan Lerman vs. Jake Abel	Nominated	
37th Saturn Awards	Best Performance by a Younger Actor	Logan Lerman	Nominated	
2010 Scream Awards	Best Cameo	Rosario Dawson	Nominated	

== Video game ==
A video game based on the film developed by Griptonite Games and published by Activision was released exclusively for Nintendo DS on February 11, 2010. GameZone's Michael Splechta gave it a 6/10, saying "Percy Jackson might not make a splash when it comes to movie tie-in games, but fans of turn-based combat might find some redeeming qualities in this otherwise bare-bones game." On Metacritic, the game has a score of 56 out of 100 based on 6 reviews, indicating "mixed or average reviews".

== Home media ==
The film was released on June 29, 2010, on DVD and Blu-ray. The movie itself charted at the top of the charts (DVD sales) with $13,985,047 in revenue in its first week. As of October 2011, the movie had sold 2,087,368 DVDs with $37.5 million in sales.

== Sequel ==
In October 2011, 20th Century Fox announced a sequel based on the second book, The Sea of Monsters. The film was released on August 7, 2013.
