= List of Canadian films of 2008 =

This is a list of Canadian films which were released in 2008:

Title	Director	Cast	Genre	Notes
Adam's Wall	Michael MacKenzie	Jesse Aaron Dwyre, Flavia Bechara, Paul Ahmarani, Maxim Roy	Romantic drama	
Adoration	Atom Egoyan	Rachel Blanchard, Scott Speedman, Kenneth Welsh, Arsinée Khanjian, Devon Bostick, Aaron Poole	Drama	
After the Ballot (Chers électeurs)	Manuel Foglia	Charlotte L'Écuyer, Daniel Turp	National Film Board Documentary	
All That She Wants (Elle veut le chaos)	Denis Côté	Ève Duranceau, Nicolas Canuel, Laurent Lucas	Drama	
The American Trap (Le piège américain)	Charles Binamé	Rémy Girard, Gérard Darmon, Colm Feore, Serge Houde	Crime drama	
Babine	Luc Picard	Vincent-Guillaume Otis, Luc Picard, Julien Poulin, Alexis Martin, Isabel Richer	Fantasy, drama	Prix Jutra – Art Direction, Sound, Music, Costumes, Makeup
The Baby Formula	Alison Reid	Angela Vint, Megan Fahlenbock	Mockumentary	
Le Banquet	Sébastien Rose	Alexis Martin, Raymond Bouchard, Benoît McGinnis	Drama	
Before Tomorrow (Le Jour avant le lendemain)	Marie-Hélène Cousineau & Madeline Ivalu	Madeline Ivalu, Paul-Dylan Ivalu	Inuit Drama	TIFF – Best Canadian Feature
Behind Me (Derrière moi)	Rafaël Ouellet		Drama	
Beyond the Walls (La Battue)	Guy Édoin		Short drama	
Blindness	Fernando Meirelles	Julianne Moore, Danny Glover, Alice Braga, Mark Ruffalo, Gael Garcia Bernal, Alice Braga, Don McKellar	Drama	Based on the novel by José Saramago; a Canada-Brazil-Japan co-production
Block B	Chris Chong Chan Fui		Experimental short	Malaysian co-production
Blonde and Blonder	Dean Hamilton	Pamela Anderson, Denise Richards	Comedy	
Borderline	Lyne Charlebois	Isabelle Blais, Jean-Hughes Anglade, Angèle Coutu	Drama	
A Broken Life	Neil Coombs	Tom Sizemore, Corey Sevier	Drama	
The Broken Line (La ligne brisée)	Louis Choquette	David Boutin, Guillaume Lemay-Thivierge	Drama	
Club Native	Tracey Deer		National Film Board Documentary	Winner of the Canada Award
Confessions of a Porn Addict	Duncan Christie	Spencer Rice, Mark Breslin, Lindsey Connell	Faux documentary	
Coopers' Camera	Warren P. Sonoda	Jason Jones, Samantha Bee, Peter Keleghan, Mike Beaver, Dave Foley	Comedy	
Cruising Bar 2	Michel Côté & Robert Ménard	Michel Côté, Véronique Le Flaguais	Comedy	Genie Award – Outstanding Achievement in Makeup
Daddy Goes Ptarmigan Hunting (Papa à la chasse aux lagopèdes)	Robert Morin	François Papineau	Drama	
The Deserter (Le Déserteur)	Simon Lavoie		Drama	
DINX	Trevor Anderson	Farren Timoteo	Short comedy	
Down Here	Charles Wilkinson	Arlene, Bingo, Gerald, Jane, Johnny, Lianne, Lisa, Lorne, Maggie, Paul	Documentary short	Winner Cleveland Best Documentary Short, VIFF Most Popular Canadian Short Film, EIFF Best Short Documentary, Venice Ondo Courta, Houston Special Jury Award
Down to the Dirt	Justin Simms	Joel Thomas Hynes, Robert Joy, Mary Lewis, Hugh Dillon	Drama	
Everything Is Fine (Tout est parfait)	Yves-Christian Fournier	Maxime Dumontier, Chloé Bourgeois, Normand D'Amour, Claude Legault	Drama	Claude Jutra Award; Prix Jutra – Supporting Actor (D’Amour)
Examined Life	Astra Taylor	Cornel West, Slavoj Žižek, Judith Butler	Documentary produced with the National Film Board	Explores contemporary philosophy
Fifty Dead Men Walking	Kari Skogland	Jim Sturgess, Ben Kingsley, Kevin Zegers, Rose McGowan	Political, crime drama based on the novel by Martin McGartland	Genie Award – Adapted Screenplay, Art Direction; Canada-U.K. co-production
FLicKeR	Nik Sheehan	Marianne Faithfull, Iggy Pop, Kenneth Anger	National Film Board Documentary	Based on the book Chapel of Extreme Experience by John G. Geiger
Forever Quebec (Infiniment Québec)	Jean-Claude Labrecque		Documentary	
Ghosts and Gravel Roads	Mike Rollo		Short documentary	
Gilles	Constant Mentzas	Hélène Loiselle, Réjean Lefrancois	Short drama	
Green Door	Semi Chellas	Don McKellar, Sabrina Grdevich, Tracy Wright, Matt Gordon, Joris Jarsky	Short comedy	
Growing Op	Michael Melski	Steven Yaffee, Wallace Langham, Rosanna Arquette, Katie Boland, Rachel Blanchard	Comedy	
Gutterballs	Ryan Nicholson	Alastair Gamble, Jeremy Beland, Mihola Terzic	Horror	
Hank and Mike	Matthiew Klinck	Paolo Mancini, Thomas Michael, Joe Mantegna, Chris Klein	Comedy	
Heart of a Dragon	Michael French	Victor Webster, Jim Byrnes	Drama	
Heaven on Earth	Deepa Mehta	Preity Zinta, Geetika Sharma, Yanna McIntosh	Drama	
Honey, I'm in Love (Le Grand départ)	Claude Meunier	Marc Messier, Guylaine Tremblay, Hélène Bourgeois Leclerc	Comedy-drama	
How She Move	Ian Iqbal Rashid	Rutina Wesley, Tre Armstrong, Dwain Murphy, Clé Bennett, Ardon Bess, Conrad Coates	Dance Drama	
It's Not Me, I Swear! (C'est pas moi, je le jure!)	Philippe Falardeau	Antoine L'Écuyer, Suzanne Clément, Gabriel Maillé	Comedy	
Junior	Isabelle Lavigne & Stéphane Thibault	Baie-Comeau Drakkar	Documentary produced with the National Film Board	Best Canadian Feature Documentary, Hot Docs
Martyrs	Pascal Laugier	Morjana Alaoui, Mylène Jampanoï	Horror	
The Memories of Angels (La Mémoire des anges)	Luc Bourdon		Collage documentary	
Mommy Is at the Hairdresser's (Maman est chez le coiffeur)	Léa Pool	Céline Bonnier, Marianne Fortier, Élie Dupuis	Drama	Made for TV
Mothers & Daughters	Carl Bessai	Tantoo Cardinal, Gabrielle Rose, Babz Chula, Camille Sullivan, Tinsel Korey	Drama	
My Father's Studio (L'atelier de mon père)	Jennifer Alleyn	Edmund Alleyn	Documentary	
My Name Is Victor Gazon (Mon nom est Victor Gazon)	Patrick Gazé		Short drama	
The Necktie	Jean-François Lévesque		National Film Board animated short	Jutra Award for best animation
The Necessities of Life	Benoît Pilon	Natar Ungalaaq, Eveline Gélinas, Paul-André Brasseur	Drama	
Next Floor	Denis Villeneuve		Short	Genie Award – Live-Action Short; Prix Jutra – Short; Cannes Film Festival – Canal+ Award
A No-Hit No-Run Summer (Un été sans point ni coup sûr)	Francis Leclerc	Patrice Robitaille, Pier-Luc Funk, Jacinthe Laguë, Roy Dupuis	Sports drama	
Nurse.Fighter.Boy	Charles Officer	Karen LeBlanc, Clark Johnson, Daniel J. Gordon	Drama	Genie Award – Song
One Week	Michael McGowan	Joshua Jackson, Liane Balaban, Gordon Downie, narrated by Campbell Scott	Drama	Genie Award - Actor (Jackson)
Otto; or Up with Dead People	Bruce LaBruce	Jey Crisfar, Marcel Schlutt	Horror	German-Canada co-production
Passage	John Walker	Rick Roberts	Documentary film	Partly based on the book Fatal Passage by Ken McGoogan
Passages	Marie-Josée Saint-Pierre		Animated short documentary	
Passchendaele	Paul Gross	Paul Gross, Caroline Dhavernas, Gil Bellows, Joe Dinicol, Meredith Bailey	Romance, World War I drama	Golden Reel Award
Pontypool	Bruce McDonald	Stephen McHattie, Lisa Houle	Horror, Thriller	Based on the Tony Burgess novel Pontypool Changes Everything, which is the name of the film sequel
Princess Margaret Blvd.	Kazik Radwanski		Short drama	
Real Time	Randall Cole	Randy Quaid, Jay Baruchel	Dramedy	
ReGOREgitated Sacrifice	Lucifer Valentine	A. Belle, The Black Angels of Hell, Honey	Horror	
RiP!: A Remix Manifesto	Brett Gaylor	Girl Talk, Lawrence Lessig, Cory Doctorow	Documentary produced with the National Film Board	Open source film about copyright law
A Sentimental Capitalism (Un capitalisme sentimental)	Olivier Asselin		Drama	
Stone of Destiny	Charles Martin Smith	Charlie Cox, Kate Mara, Robert Carlyle, Billy Boyd	Drama	Canada-U.K. co-production
Tiger Spirit	Min Sook Lee		Documentary	
To Each Her Own	Heather Tobin	Hannah Hogan, Dre Carrington, Shaughnessy Redden	Drama	
Tomorrow (Demain)	Maxime Giroux	Eugénie Beaudry, Guillaume Beauregard, Serge Houde	Drama	
Truffles (Truffe)	Kim Nguyen	Roy Dupuis, Céline Bonnier, Pierre Lebeau, Danielle Proulx	Science fiction comedy	
Under the Hood: A Voyage Into the World of Torture	Patricio Henríquez		Documentary	
Up the Yangtze	Yung Chang		National Film Board Documentary	Genie Award for best documentary
Waitresses Wanted (Serveuses demandées)	Guylaine Dionne	Clara Furey, Anne Dorval, Colm Feore	Drama	
West of Pluto (À l'ouest de Pluton)	Myriam Verreault, Henry Bernadet		Docufiction, comedy-drama	
Who Is KK Downey?	Darren Curtis, Pat Kiely	Darren Curtis, Pat Kiely, Matt Silver	Comedy	

== See also ==
- 2008 in Canada
- 2008 in Canadian television
