= 2008 Toronto International Film Festival =

Annual Canadian film festival

- Festival poster
- Opening film: Passchendaele
- Location: Toronto, Canada
- Hosted by: Toronto International Film Festival Group
- No. of films: 312 films
- Festival date: September 4, 2008–September 13, 2008
- Language: English
- Website: web.archive.org/web/20080918014646/http://tiff08.ca/default2.aspx
- 2009 2007

The 2008 Toronto International Film Festival (TIFF) was held in Toronto, Ontario, Canada. This 33rd annual festival was from September 4 to September 13, 2008. The opening night gala was the World War I romantic epic Passchendaele from Canadian director Paul Gross.

== About the 2008 Festival ==
The 2008 festival was heavy on Canadian fare as well as featuring prominent indie films and worldwide as well as North American debuts including: Adoration directed by Canada's own Atom Egoyan, Appaloosa the second film from Ed Harris (who directed Pollock), Blindness from screenwriter-director, Fernando Meirelles, Iraq war thriller The Hurt Locker directed by Kathryn Bigelow, and veteran filmmaker Barbet Schroeder's Inju, la bête dans l'ombre. Scheduled is The Loss of a Teardrop Diamond (directed by Jodie Markell), based on a "rediscovered" Tennessee Williams screenplay. TIFF screened 312 films from 64 countries. These include 249 features, most of which were North American and/or world premieres.

Neil Burger (director of The Illusionist) world premiered The Lucky Ones a character study of U.S. soldiers on an unplanned road trip, starring Tim Robbins.

Also featured was Me and Orson Welles helmed by American "slacker" Richard Linklater, the Spike Lee-directed World War II film, Miracle at St. Anna as well as the Jonathan Demme directed film Rachel Getting Married. Other festival highlights are screenwriter Charlie Kaufman's first film, Synecdoche, New York, a slice of experimental filmmaker James Benning's Americana RR was featured in the "Wavelengths" avant-garde showcase, the four-hour-long Steven Soderbergh epic Che (playing in two parts), as well as The Wrestler lensed by Darren Aronofsky. The Brits are also well represented with Happy-Go-Lucky directed by Mike Leigh and Slumdog Millionaire directed by Danny Boyle.

Despite showing fewer films than last year, among the 249 features, 116 are premieres and 61 are first features. Films from as many as 64 countries were screened, with more than 340,000 admissions expected.

"Canadian Open Vault", which always highlights a restored Canadian film, focused on Quebec filmmaker François Girard's 32 Short Films About Glenn Gould made in 1993.

Actors Brad Pitt, Edward Norton, Benicio del Toro, Ethan Hawke, Laura Linney and film directors Julian Schnabel, Kathryn Bigelow and Steven Soderbergh are among the celebs the festival has invited on its 500-plus guest list, thus completing its lineup.

The festival closed on September 13, 2008 with the North American premiere of Stone of Destiny written and directed by Charles Martin Smith, the true story of four Glasgow university students who try to restore the 300-pound Stone of Scone to its rightful Scottish home.

With the film Fifty Dead Men Walking, Rose McGowan expressed support for the cause of the Irish Republican Army (IRA), with the reports of her comments being released into the media on September 11, 2008. After starring in Fifty Dead Men Walking, she was quoted as saying "I imagine had I grown up in Belfast, I would 100% have been in the IRA. My heart just broke for the cause. Violence is not to be played out daily and provide an answer to problems, but I understand it." Her comments were attacked by the original author Martin McCartlend. McCartland had general objections against the film, but approved of an out of court settlement, believed to be in the region of £20,000 (US$35,000 in summer 2008).

== Awards ==
Award	Film	Director
People's Choice Award	Slumdog Millionaire	Danny Boyle
People's Choice Award First Runner Up	More Than a Game	Kristopher Belman
People's Choice Award Second Runner Up	The Stoning of Soraya M.	Cyrus Nowrasteh
Discovery Award	Hunger	Steve McQueen
Best Canadian Feature Film	Lost Song	Rodrigue Jean
Best Canadian Feature Film – Special Jury Citation	Adoration	Atom Egoyan
Best Canadian First Feature Film	Before Tomorrow (Le Jour avant le lendemain)	Madeline Ivalu & Marie-Hélène Cousineau
Best Canadian First Feature Film – Special Jury Citation	Borderline	Lyne Charlebois
Best Canadian Short Film	Block B	Chris Chong Chan Fui
Best Canadian Short Film – Special Jury Citation	Next Floor	Denis Villeneuve
FIPRESCI Discovery	Lymelife	Derick Martini
FIPRESCI Special Presentations	Disgrace	Steve Jacobs

== Programme ==
=== Gala Presentations ===
English title	Original title	Director(s)	Production country
Burn After Reading		Joel Coen, Ethan Coen	United States
Dean Spanley		Toa Fraser	United Kingdom
The Duchess		Saul Dibb	France, Italy, United Kingdom, United States
Fifty Dead Men Walking		Kari Skogland	Canada, United Kingdom, Ireland
The Girl from Monaco	La Fille de Monaco	Anne Fontaine	France
The Good, the Bad, the Weird	좋은 놈, 나쁜 놈, 이상한 놈	Kim Jee-woon	South Korea
The Loss of a Teardrop Diamond		Jodie Markell	United States
The Lucky Ones		Neil Burger	United States
Mesrine: Public Enemy No. One		Jean-François Richet	France
Nothing But the Truth		Rod Lurie	United States
One Week		Michael McGowan	Canada
The Other Man		Richard Eyre	United Kingdom, United States
Passchendaele		Paul Gross	Canada
Pride and Glory		Gavin O'Connor	Germany, United States
Rachel Getting Married		Jonathan Demme	United States
The Secret Life of Bees		Gina Prince-Bythewood	United States
Singh Is Kinng		Anees Bazmee	India
Stone of Destiny		Charles Martin Smith	Canada, United Kingdom
Who Do You Love?		Jerry Zaks	United States
A Year Ago in Winter	Im Winter ein Jahr	Caroline Link	Germany

=== Special Presentations ===
English title	Original title	Director(s)	Production country
35 Shots of Rum	35 Rhums	Claire Denis	France, Germany
Adoration		Atom Egoyan	Canada
Appaloosa		Ed Harris	United States
Ashes of Time Redux		Wong Kar-wai	Hong Kong
Blindness		Fernando Meirelles	Brazil, Canada, Japan
The Brothers Bloom		Rian Johnson	United States
The Burning Plain		Guillermo Arriaga	United States
Che		Steven Soderbergh	Spain, Germany, France, United States
A Christmas Tale	Un conte de Noël	Arnaud Desplechin	France
The Class	Entre les murs	Laurent Cantet	France
Disgrace		Steve Jacobs	Australia
Il Divo		Paolo Sorrentino	Italy, France
Easy Virtue		Stephan Elliott	United Kingdom
Empty Nest	El nido vacío	Daniel Burman	Argentina, France, Italy, Spain
Every Little Step		James Stern, Adam Del Deo	United States
Flash of Genius		Marc Abraham	United States
Genova		Michael Winterbottom	United Kingdom
Ghost Town		David Koepp	United States
Gomorrah		Matteo Garrone	Italy
Good		Vincente Amorim	United Kingdom, Germany, Hungary
Happy-Go-Lucky		Mike Leigh	United Kingdom
Heaven on Earth		Deepa Mehta	Canada, India
The Hurt Locker		Kathryn Bigelow	United States
I've Loved You So Long	Il y a longtemps que je t'aime	Philippe Claudel	France, Germany
Inju: The Beast in the Shadow	Inju, la bête dans l'ombre	Barbet Schroeder	France
Is Anybody There?		John Crowley	United Kingdom
It's Not Me, I Swear!	C'est pas moi, je le jure!	Philippe Falardeau	Canada
Kanchivaram		Priyadarshan	India
Last Stop 174	Última Parada 174	Bruno Barreto	Brazil
Management		Stephen Belber	United States
Me and Orson Welles		Richard Linklater	United States
Miracle at St. Anna		Spike Lee	United States
New York, I Love You		Fatih Akin, Yvan Attal, Randy Balsmeyer, Allen Hughes, Shunji Iwai, Scarlett Johansson, Shekhar Kapur, Joshua Marston, Mira Nair, Natalie Portman, Brett Ratner, Jiang Wen, Andrey Zvyagintsev	United States
Nick & Norah's Infinite Playlist		Peter Sollett	United States
Paris 36	Faubourg 36	Christophe Barratier	France
A Perfect Day	Un giorno perfetto	Ferzan Özpetek	Italy
Plastic City	Dangkou	Yu Lik-wai	Brazil, Hong Kong, China, Japan
One Day You Will Understand	Plus tard, tu comprendras	Amos Gitai	France, Germany
Religulous		Larry Charles	United States
RocknRolla		Guy Ritchie	United Kingdom, United States, France
The Sea Wall	Un Barrage contre le Pacifique	Rithy Panh	France, Cambodia, Belgium
Séraphine		Martin Provost	France, Belgium
Slumdog Millionaire		Danny Boyle	United Kingdom
Still Walking	Aruitemo aruitemo	Hirokazu Kore-eda	Japan
Synecdoche, New York		Charlie Kaufman	United States
Valentino: The Last Emperor		Matt Tyrnauer	United States
Waltz with Bashir	Vals im Bashir	Ari Folman	Israel
With a Little Help from Myself	Aide-toi et le ciel t'aidera	François Dupeyron	France
A Woman in Berlin	Anonyma – Eine Frau in Berlin	Max Färberböck	Germany, Poland
The Wrestler		Darren Aronofsky	United States
Youssou N'Dour: I Bring What I Love		Elizabeth Chai Vasarhelyi	United States
Zack and Miri Make a Porno		Kevin Smith	United States

=== Contemporary World Cinema ===
English title	Original title	Director(s)	Production country
33 Scenes from Life	33 sceny z życia	Małgorzata Szumowska	Poland
Acne	Acné	Federico Veiroj	Uruguay, Argentina, Mexico, Spain
Adela		Adolfo Alix Jr.	Philippines
Adhen	Dernier maquis	Rabah Ameur-Zaïmeche	France, Algeria
All Around Us	Gururi no koto	Ryōsuke Hashiguchi	Japan
The Blind Sunflowers	Los girasoles ciegos	José Luis Cuerda	Spain
Cloud 9	Wolke Neun	Andreas Dresen	Germany
The Country Teacher	Venkovský učitel	Bohdan Sláma	Czechia
Country Wedding	Sveitabrúðkaup	Valdís Óskarsdóttir	Iceland
Fear Me Not	Den du frygter	Kristian Levring	Denmark
A Film with Me in It		Ian Fitzgibbon	Ireland
Firaaq		Nandita Das	India
Five Dollars a Day		Nigel Cole	United States
Flame & Citron	Flammen & Citronen	Ole Christian Madsen	Denmark
The Ghost	Domovoi	Karen Oganesyan	Russia
Goodbye Solo		Ramin Bahrani	United States
El Greco		Yannis Smaragdis	Greece
Horn of Plenty	El cuerno de la abundancia	Juan Carlos Tabío	Cuba, Spain
In the Shadow of the Naga	Nak prok	Phawat Panangkasiri	Thailand
Jerichow		Christian Petzold	Germany
Katia's Sister	Het zusje van Katia	Mijke de Jong	Netherlands
Khamsa		Karim Dridi	France, Germany, Tunisia
Knitting	Niú lán zhī nǔ	Yin Lichuan	China
Laila's Birthday	Eid Milad Laila	Rashid Masharawi	Palestine, Tunisia, Netherlands
Linha de Passe		Walter Salles, Daniela Thomas	Brazil
Lion's Den	Leonera	Pablo Trapero	Argentina, South Korea, Brazil, Spain
Lost Song		Rodrigue Jean	Canada
Machan		Uberto Pasolini	Italy, Sri Lanka
Mark of an Angel	L'Empreinte de l'ange	Safy Nebbou	France
Mommy Is at the Hairdresser's	Maman est chez le coiffeur	Léa Pool	Canada
Middle of Nowhere		John Stockwell	United States
Mothers & Daughters		Carl Bessai	Canada
My Mother, My Bride and I	Die zweite Frau	Hans Steinbichler	Germany
The Narrows		François Velle	United States
Native Dancer	Baksy	Gulshat Omarova	Kazakhstan, Russia, France, Germany
A No-Hit No-Run Summer	Un été sans point ni coup sûr	Francis Leclerc	Canada
O' Horten		Bent Hamer	Norway, France, Germany, Denmark
Once Upon a Time in Rio	Era uma Vez...	Breno Silveira	Brazil
Pandora's Box	Pandora'nın Kutusu	Yeşim Ustaoğlu	Turkey
Patrik, Age 1.5	Patrik 1,5	Ella Lemhagen	Sweden
Pedro		Nicholas Oceano	United States
Radio Love		Leonardo de Armas	Spain
The Rest of the Night	Il Resto della notte	Francesco Munzi	Italy
Restless		Amos Kollek	Israel, France, Canada, Germany, Belgium
Return to Hansala	Retorno a Hansala	Chus Gutiérrez	Spain
Revanche		Götz Spielmann	Austria
Skin		Anthony Fabian	South Africa, United Kingdom
Summer Hours	L'Heure d'été	Olivier Assayas	France
Sugar		Anna Boden, Ryan Fleck	United States
Teza		Haile Gerima	Ethiopia
Three Wise Men	Kolme viisasta miestä	Mika Kaurismäki	Finland
Toronto Stories		David Weaver, Sudz Sutherland, Aaron Woodley, Sook-Yin Lee	Canada
Treeless Mountain	Namueopneun San	So Yong Kim	South Korea
Two-legged Horse	Asbe du-pa	Samira Makhmalbaf	Iran
Under the Tree	Di Bawah Pohon	Garin Nugroho	Indonesia
Wendy and Lucy		Kelly Reichardt	United States
White Night Wedding	Brúðguminn	Baltasar Kormákur	Iceland
The Window	La Ventana	Carlos Sorin	Argentina, Spain

=== Discovery ===
English title	Original title	Director(s)	Production country
$9.99		Tatia Rosenthal	Australia
Apron Strings		Sima Urale	New Zealand
Better Things		Duane Hopkins	United Kingdom
Cold Lunch	Lønsj	Eva Sørhaug	Norway
Daytime Drinking	Najsul	Young-seok Noh	South Korea
Delta		Kornél Mundruczó	Hungary
Gigantic		Matt Aselton	United States
Hooked		Adrian Sitaru	Romania
Hunger		Steve McQueen	Ireland, United Kingdom
Kabuli Kid		Barmak Akram	France, Afghanistan
Lovely, Still		Nik Fackler	United States
Lymelife		Derick Martini, Steve Martini	United States
Medicine for Melancholy		Barry Jenkins	United States
The Paranoids	Los paranoicos	Gabriel Medina	Argentina
Parc		Arnaud des Pallières	France
Rain		Maria Govan	Bahamas
Snow	Snijeg	Aida Begić	Bosnia and Herzegovina, Germany, France, Iran
The Stoning of Soraya M.	Sangsār-e Sorayā M.	Cyrus Nowrasteh	United States
Tale 52	Istoria 52	Alexis Alexiou	Greece
Three Blind Mice		Matthew Newton	Australia
Tony Manero		Pablo Larraín	Chile
Tulpan		Sergey Dvortsevoy	Kazakhstan, Germany
Vacation	Kyuka	Hajime Kadoi	Japan
What Doesn't Kill You		Brian Goodman	United States
Winds of September	九降風	Tom Lin Shu-yu	Taiwan
Zift	Dzift	Javor Gardev	Bulgaria

=== Canada First ===
English title	Original title	Director(s)	Production country
Before Tomorrow	Le jour avant le lendemain	Marie-Hélène Cousineau, Madeline Ivalu	Canada
Borderline		Lyne Charlebois	Canada
Control Alt Delete		Cameron Labine	Canada
Coopers' Camera		Warren P. Sonoda	Canada
Down to the Dirt		Justin Simms	Canada
Edison and Leo		Neil Burns	Canada
Nurse.Fighter.Boy		Charles Officer	Canada
Only		Ingrid Veninger, Simon Reynolds	Canada
Real Time		Randall Cole	Canada
When Life Was Good		Terry Miles	Canada

=== Real to Reel ===
English title	Original title	Director(s)	Production country
7915 KM		Nikolaus Geyrhalter	Austria
American Swing		Mathew Kaufman	United States
At the Edge of the World		Dan Stone	United States
The Biggest Chinese Restaurant in the World		Weijun Chen	United Kingdom, Denmark, Netherlands
Blind Loves	Slepe lásky	Juraj Lehotsky	Slovakia
Citizen Juling	Polamuang Juling	Kraisak Choonhavan, Manit Sriwanichpoom, Ing K	Thailand
The Dungeon Masters		Keven McAlester	United States
Examined Life		Astra Taylor	Canada
Food, Inc.		Robert Kenner	United States
From Mother to Daughter	Di madre in figlia	Andrea Zambelli	Italy
Harvard Beats Yale 29–29		Kevin Rafferty	United States
The Heart of Jenin	Das Herz von Jenin	Leon Geller, Marcus Vetter	Germany
It Might Get Loud		Davis Guggenheim	United States
Killing Kasztner		Gaylen Ross	United States
The Memories of Angels	La mémoire des anges	Luc Bourdon	Canada
More Than a Game		Kristopher Belman	United States
Paris, Not France		Adria Petty	United States
Peace Mission		Dorothee Wenner	Germany
The Real Shaolin		Alexander Sebastien Lee	United States, China
Sea Point Days		François Verster	South Africa
Shakespeare and Victor Hugo's Intimacies	Intimidades de Shakespeare y Víctor Hugo	Yulene Olaizola	Mexico
Shooting Robert King		Richard Parry	United Kingdom
Soul Power		Jeff Levy-Hinte	United States
Sounds Like Teen Spirit		Jamie Jay Johnson	United Kingdom
Under Rich Earth	Bajo Suelos Ricos	Malcolm Rogge	Canada
Unmistaken Child		Nati Baratz	Israel
Unwanted Witness	Sin Tregua	Juan José Lozano	Switzerland, France
Upstream Battle		Ben Kempas	Germany
Witch Hunt		Dana Nachman, Don Hardy	United States
Yes Madam, Sir		Megan Doneman	Australia, India

=== Masters ===
English title	Original title	Director(s)	Production country
Achilles and the Tortoise	Akiresu to Kame	Takeshi Kitano	Japan
Adam Resurrected	Adam Ben Kelev	Paul Schrader	Germany, Israel, United States
The Beaches of Agnès	Les Plages d'Agnès	Agnès Varda	France
Everlasting Moments	Maria Larssons eviga ögonblick	Jan Troell	Sweden
Four Nights with Anna	Cztery noce z Anną	Jerzy Skolimowski	Poland, France
Lorna's Silence	Le Silence de Lorna	Jean-Pierre Dardenne, Luc Dardenne	Belgium, Italy, Germany
Of Time and the City		Terence Davies	United Kingdom
This Night	Nuit de chien	Werner Schroeter	Portugal, Germany, France
Three Monkeys	Üç Maymun	Nuri Bilge Ceylan	Turkey
Tokyo Sonata		Kiyoshi Kurosawa	Japan

=== Mavericks ===
English title	Original title	Director(s)	Production country
The People Speak		Howard Zinn, Chris Moore, Anthony Arnove	United States
Picasso and Braque Go to the Movies		Arne Glimcher	United States
A Time to Stir		Paul Cronin	United Kingdom, United States

=== Canadian Open Vault ===
English title	Original title	Director(s)	Production country
Thirty Two Short Films About Glenn Gould		François Girard	Canada

=== Vanguard ===
English title	Original title	Director(s)	Production country
Afterwards	Et après	Gilles Bourdos	Canada, France
Behind Me	Derrière moi	Rafaël Ouellet	Canada
Gods	Dioses	Josué Méndez	Peru
I'm Gonna Explode	Voy a Explotar	Gerardo Naranjo	Mexico
Kisses		Lance Daly	Ireland
Ocean Flame	Yíbàn Haǐshuǐ, Yíbàn Huǒyàn	Liu Fendou	Hong Kong
Pa-ra-da		Marco Pontecorvo	Italy, France, Romania
Pontypool		Bruce McDonald	Canada
Sauna		Antti-Jussi Annila	Finland
Service	Serbis	Brillante Mendoza	Philippines
Tears for Sale	Čarlston za Ognjenku	Uroš Stojanović	Serbia
Universalove		Thomas Woschitz	Austria

=== Visions ===
English title	Original title	Director(s)	Production country
24 City	二十四城记	Jia Zhangke	China
Birdsong	El cant dels ocells	Albert Serra	Spain
I Want to See	Je veux voir	Joana Hadjithomas, Khalil Joreige	France, Lebanon
Liverpool		Lisandro Alonso	Argentina, France, Netherlands, Germany, Spain
Milk	Süt	Semih Kaplanoğlu	Turkey
Salamander	Salamandra	Pablo Agüero	France, Germany
The Sky Crawlers	Sukai Kurora	Mamoru Oshii	Japan
Uncertainty		Scott McGehee, David Siegel	United States
Unspoken	Non-dit	Fien Troch	Belgium
Vinyan		Fabrice du Welz	France, Australia, Belgium, United Kingdom

=== Midnight Madness ===
English title	Original title	Director(s)	Production country
Acolytes		Jon Hewitt	Australia
The Burrowers		J. T. Petty	United States
Chocolate		Prachya Pinkaew	Thailand
Deadgirl		Marcel Sarmiento, Gadi Harel	United States
Detroit Metal City	Detoroito Metaru Shiti	Toshio Lee	Japan
Eden Log		Franck Vestiel	France
JCVD		Mabrouk El Mechri	Belgium, France, Luxembourg
Martyrs		Pascal Laugier	France, Canada
Not Quite Hollywood		Mark Hartley	Australia, United States
Sexykiller	Sexykiller, morirás por ella	Miguel Martí	Spain

=== Short Cuts Canada ===
English title	Original title	Director(s)	Production country
106		Candice Day	Canada
The Amendment		Kevin Papatie	Canada
Baghdad Twist		Joe Balass	Canada
Bedroom		Jordan Canning	Canada
Belonging		Elizabeth Lazebnik	Canada
Beyond the Walls	La Battue	Guy Édoin	Canada
The Catsitter		Tim Hamilton	Canada
Cattle Call		Matthew Rankin, Mike Maryniuk	Canada
The Earring		Nicholas Pye, Sheila Pye	Canada
Forty Men for the Yukon		Tony Massil	Canada
Gilles		Constant Mentzas	Canada
Green Door		Semi Chellas	Canada
Hers at Last		Helen Lee	Canada
How Are You?		Susan Coyne, Martha Burns	Canada
Hungu		Nicolas Brault	Canada
Lobotomobile		Sara St. Onge	Canada
Machine with Wishbone		Randall Okita	Canada
My Name Is Victor Gazon	Mon nom est Victor Gazon	Patrick Gazé	Canada
Next Floor		Denis Villeneuve	Canada
Night Vision		Philip Barker	Canada
Noon	Midi	Dan Popa	Canada
Passage		Karl Lemieux	Canada
Passages		Marie-Josée Saint-Pierre	Canada
Pat's First Kiss		Pat Mills	Canada
Pierce, Crush, Escape: Notes on the Boreal		Susan Turcot	Canada
Princess Margaret Blvd.		Kazik Radwanski	Canada
Pudge		Annie Bradley	Canada
Rosa Rosa		Félix Dufour-Laperrière	Canada
Running (Heart, Body, Mind, Spirit)		Ann Marie Fleming	Canada
A Small Thing		Adam Garnet Jones	Canada
Spoiled		Sherry White	Canada
Sunday		Jamie M. Dagg	Canada
Synthesizer	Synthétiseur	Sarah Fortin	Canada
Uniform Material		Chris McCarroll	Canada
Us Chickens		Mark Van de Ven	Canada
What I've Lost		Duraid Munajim	Canada
Whitmore Park		Brian Stockton	Canada
The Workout		Sami Khan	Canada

=== Sprockets Family Zone ===
English title	Original title	Director(s)	Production country
Krabat		Marco Kreuzpaintner	Germany
Mia and the Migoo	Mia et le Migou	Jacques-Rémy Girerd	France, Italy
The Secret of Moonacre		Gábor Csupó	France, Australia, Hungary, United Kingdom, United States
Sunshine Barry & The Disco Worms	Disco ormene	Thomas Borch Nielsen	Denmark, Germany

=== Wavelengths ===
English title	Original title	Director(s)	Production country
Artemis's Knee	Le Genou d'Artemide	Jean-Marie Straub	Italy, France
L'Atelier		Hannes Schüpbach	Switzerland
Black and White Trypps Number Three		Ben Russell	United States
Block B		Chris Chong Chan Fui	Canada, Malaysia
Dig		Robert Todd	United States
Encyclopaedia Britannica		John Latham	United Kingdom
Flash in the Metropolitan		Rosalind Nashashibi, Lucy Skaer	United Kingdom
Garden/ing		Eriko Sonoda	Japan
Horizontal Boundaries		Pat O'Neill	United States
How to Conduct a Love Affair		David Gatten	United States
Lossless #2		Rebecca Baron, Douglas Goodwin	United States
Mosaik Mécanique		Norbert Pfaffenbichler	Austria
Optra Field III-VI		T. Marie	United States
The Parable of the Tulip Painter and the Fly		Charlotte Pryce	United States
Paricutin		Erika Loic	Canada
Public Domain		Jim Jennings	United States
Refraction Series		Chris Gehman	Canada
Rodakis		Olaf Nikolai	Germany
RR		James Benning	United States
Sarabande		Nathaniel Dorsky	United States
The Secret History of the Dividing Line		David Gatten	United States
Suspension		Vanessa O'Neill	United States
Tell Me On Tuesday	Sag es mir Dienstag	Astrid Ofner	Austria
Trypps #5 (Dubai)		Ben Russell	United States
Tziporah		Abraham Ravett	United States
When It Was Blue		Jennifer Reeves	United States, Iceland
Winter		Nathaniel Dorsky	United States

=== Future Projections ===
English title	Original title	Director(s)	Production country
The Butcher's Shop		Philip Haas	United States
Cathedral		Marco Brambilla	Canada
The Death of Tom		Glenn Ligon	United States
I'm Feeling Lucky		Samuel Chow	Canada
Teenager Hamlet 2006		Margaux Williamson	Canada
Utopia Suite		Clive Holden	Canada
When the Gods Came Down to Earth		Srinivas Krishna	Canada

=== Yonge-Dundas Square ===
Free public events at Yonge-Dundas Square (now Sankofa Square), including outdoor film screenings and promotional tie-in concerts.

- Terence Blanchard
- The Celluloid Closet
- Easy Riders, Raging Bulls: How the Sex, Drugs and Rock ’n’ Roll Generation Saved Hollywood
- EdgeCodes.com: The Art of Motion Picture Editing
- Great Lake Swimmers
- Emm Gryner
- Hearts of Darkness: A Filmmaker's Apocalypse
- Keb' Mo'
- Youssou N'Dour
- That's Entertainment!
- Visions of Light: The Art of Cinematography

== Canada's Top Ten ==
TIFF's annual Canada's Top Ten list, its national critics and festival programmers poll of the ten best feature and short films of the year, was released in December 2008.

=== Feature films ===
- Adoration — Atom Egoyan
- Before Tomorrow (Le jour avant le lendemain) — Marie-Hélène Cousineau, Madeline Ivalu
- Fifty Dead Men Walking — Kari Skogland
- Heaven on Earth — Deepa Mehta
- It's Not Me, I Swear! (C'est pas moi, je le jure) — Philippe Falardeau
- Lost Song — Rodrigue Jean
- Mommy Is at the Hairdresser's (Maman est chez le coiffeur) — Léa Pool
- The Memories of Angels (La Memoire des anges) — Luc Bourdon
- The Necessities of Life (Ce qu'il faut pour vivre) — Benoît Pilon
- Pontypool — Bruce McDonald

=== Short films ===
- Beyond the Walls (La Battue) — Guy Édoin
- Block B — Chris Chong Chan Fui
- Drux Flux — Theodore Ushev
- Ghosts and Gravel Roads — Mike Rollo
- Green Door — Semi Chellas
- My Name Is Victor Gazon (Mon nom est Victor Gazon) — Patrick Gazé
- Next Floor — Denis Villeneuve
- Nikamowin (Song) — Kevin Lee Burton
- Passages — Marie-Josée Saint-Pierre
- Princess Margaret Blvd. — Kazik Radwanski
