= The Dead Water =

2006 Canadian short film

- French: Les Eaux mortes
- Directed by: Guy Édoin
- Written by: Guy Édoin
- Produced by: Sylvain Corbeil; Pascal Bascaron
- Starring: Monique Miller; Gabriel Gascon
- Cinematography: Serge Desrosiers
- Edited by: Mathieu Denis
- Production company: Metafilms
- Distributed by: Locomotion Distributions
- Release date: July 23, 2006 (Fantasia)
- Running time: 17 minutes
- Country: Canada
- Language: French

The Dead Water (French: Les Eaux mortes) is a Canadian short drama film, directed by Guy Édoin and released in 2006. The second film in his "Les Affluents" trilogy of short films on rural themes, following The Bridge (Le pont) in 2004 and preceding Beyond the Walls (La Battue) in 2008, the film stars Monique Miller as a deceased woman whose ghost is haunting her widower (Gabriel Gascon).

The film won the Prix Jutra for Best Short Film at the 9th Jutra Awards in 2007.

All three films in the trilogy were subsequently released as bonus features on the DVD release of Édoin's feature film debut Wetlands (Marécages) in 2012.
