= List of awards and nominations received by Denis Villeneuve =

Denis Villeneuve awards and nominations
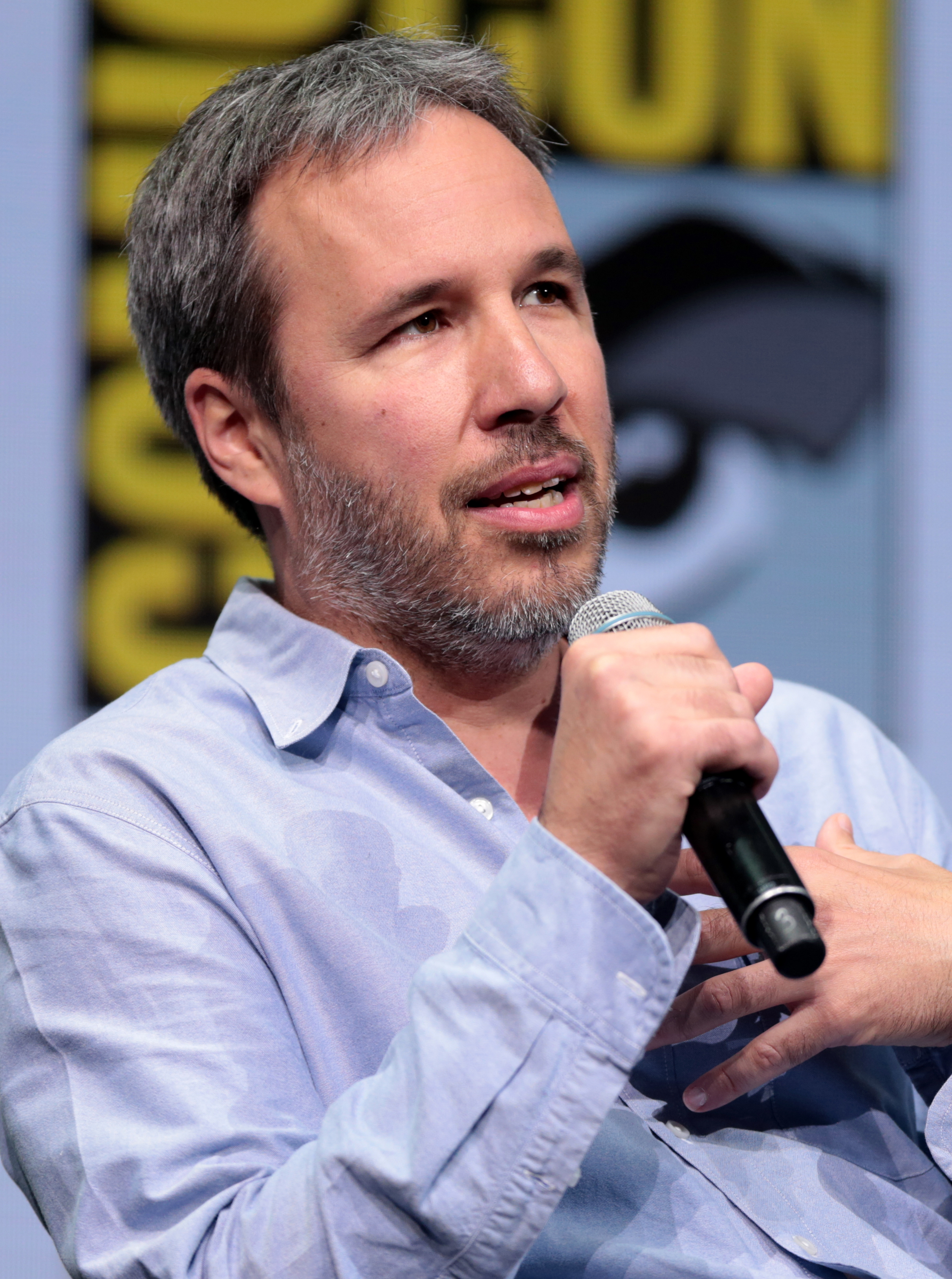
Awards and nominations
Award	Wins	Nominations
Golden Globe	0	2
Academy Awards	0	4
BAFTA Awards	0	5

This is a list of awards and nominations received by Denis Villeneuve.

Denis Villeneuve is a French-Canadian film director and writer known for directing critically acclaimed dramas ranging from both independent films and big budget films. He has received numerous awards nominations including for four Academy Awards, five BAFTA Awards, seven Critics' Choice Movie Awards and two Golden Globe Awards.

== Major associations ==
=== Academy Awards ===
Year	Category	Nominated work	Result	Ref.
2016	Best Director	Arrival	Nominated	
2021	Best Picture	Dune	Nominated	
2021	Best Adapted Screenplay	Dune	Nominated	
2024	Best Picture	Dune: Part Two	Nominated	

=== BAFTA Awards ===
Year	Category	Nominated work	Result	Ref.
British Academy Film Awards
2016	Best Direction	Arrival	Nominated	
2017	Best Direction	Blade Runner 2049	Nominated	
2021	Best Film	Dune	Nominated	
2021	Best Adapted Screenplay	Dune	Nominated	
2025	Best Direction	Dune: Part Two	Nominated	

=== Critics' Choice Awards ===
Year	Category	Nominated work	Result	Ref.
Critics' Choice Movie Awards
2016	Best Director	Arrival	Nominated	
2021	Best Picture	Dune	Nominated	
2021	Best Director	Dune	Nominated	
2021	Best Adapted Screenplay	Dune	Nominated	
2024	Best Picture	Dune: Part Two	Nominated	
2024	Best Director	Dune: Part Two	Nominated	
2024	Best Adapted Screenplay	Dune: Part Two	Nominated	

=== Golden Globe Awards ===
Year	Category	Nominated work	Result	Ref.
2021	Best Motion Picture – Drama	Dune	Nominated	
2021	Best Director	Dune	Nominated	

== Miscellaneous awards ==
Organizations	Year	Category	Work	Result	Ref.
AACTA International Awards	2017	Best Direction	Arrival	Nominated	
AACTA International Awards	2022	Best Direction	Dune	Won	
Abu Dhabi Film Festival	2014	Best Narrative Feature	Enemy	Nominated	
Atlantic Film Festival	2011	Best Canadian Feature Film	Incendies	Won	
Art Directors Guild Awards	2022	William Cameron Menzies Award		Won	
Berlin International Film Festival	2001	FIPRESCI Prize	Maelström	Won	
Canadian Screen Awards	2001	Best Direction	Maelström	Won	
Canadian Screen Awards	2001	Best Screenplay	Maelström	Won	
Canadian Screen Awards	2009	Best Live Action Short Drama	Next Floor	Won	
Canadian Screen Awards	2010	Best Direction	Polytechnique	Won	
Canadian Screen Awards	2011	Best Direction	Incendies	Won	
Canadian Screen Awards	2011	Best Adapted Screenplay	Incendies	Won	
Canadian Screen Awards	2014	Best Direction	Enemy	Won	
Cannes Film Festival	1998	Un Certain Regard	August 32nd on Earth	Nominated	
Cannes Film Festival	2008	Leitz Cine Discovery Prize	Next Floor	Nominated	
Cannes Film Festival	2008	Canal+ Award	Next Floor	Won	
Cannes Film Festival	2009	Cicae Art Cinema Award	Polytechnique	Nominated	
Cannes Film Festival	2015	Palme d'Or	Sicario	Nominated	
Directors Guild of America Awards	2017	Outstanding Directing – Feature Film	Arrival	Nominated	
Directors Guild of America Awards	2022	Outstanding Directing – Feature Film	Dune	Nominated	
Directors Guild of Canada	2014	Feature Film	Enemy	Won	
Empire Awards	2014	Best Thriller	Prisoners	Nominated	
Hugo Awards	2017	Best Dramatic Presentation	Arrival	Won	
Hugo Awards	2018	Best Dramatic Presentation	Blade Runner 2049	Nominated	
Hugo Awards	2022	Best Dramatic Presentation	Dune	Won	
IndieWire Critics Poll	2016	Best Director	Arrival	7th Place	
Jutra Awards	1999	Best Direction	August 32nd on Earth	Nominated	
Jutra Awards	1999	Best Screenplay	August 32nd on Earth	Nominated	
Jutra Awards	2001	Best Direction	Maelström	Won	
Jutra Awards	2001	Best Screenplay	Maelström	Won	
Jutra Awards	2009	Best Short Film	Next Floor	Won	
Jutra Awards	2010	Best Direction	Polytechnique	Won	
Jutra Awards	2011	Best Direction	Incendies	Won	
Jutra Awards	2011	Best Screenplay	Incendies	Won	
Jutra Awards	2012	Most Successful Film Outside Québec	Incendies	Won	
Jutra Awards	2015	Best Direction	Enemy	Nominated	
Nashville Film Festival	2009	Best Narrative Short	Next Floor	Won	
People's Choice Awards	2014	Favorite Dramatic Movie	Prisoners	Nominated	
Producers Guild of America Awards	2022	Outstanding Producer of Theatrical Motion Pictures	Dune	Nominated	
Satellite Awards	2016	Best Film	Sicario	Nominated	
Satellite Awards	2022	Best Motion Picture – Drama	Dune	Nominated	
Satellite Awards	2022	Best Director	Dune	Nominated	
Satellite Awards	2022	Best Adapted Screenplay	Dune	Nominated	
Saturn Awards	2017	Best Science Fiction Film	Arrival	Nominated	
Saturn Awards	2017	Best Director	Arrival	Nominated	
Saturn Awards	2018	Best Science Fiction Film	Blade Runner 2049	Won	
Saturn Awards	2018	Best Director	Blade Runner 2049	Nominated	
Saturn Awards	2025	Best Science Fiction Film	Dune: Part Two	Won	
Saturn Awards	2025	Best Director	Dune: Part Two	Won	
Saturn Awards	2025	Best Writing	Dune: Part Two	Nominated	
Teen Choice Awards	2017	Choice Movie: Sci-Fi	Arrival	Nominated	
Teen Choice Awards	2018	Choice Movie: Sci-Fi	Blade Runner 2049	Nominated	
Toronto International Film Festival	2000	Best Canadian Film	Maelström	Won	
Toronto International Film Festival	2008	Best Canadian Short Film	Next Floor	Won	
Toronto International Film Festival	2011	Best Canadian Feature Film	Incendies	Won	
Toronto International Film Festival	2013	People's Choice Awards	Prisoners	3rd Place	
Toronto International Film Festival	2021	TIFF Ebert Director Award	Dune	Won	
Vancouver International Film Festival	2011	Best Canadian Feature Film	Incendies	Won	
Venice Film Festival	2016	Future Film Festival Digital Award	Arrival	Won	
Venice Film Festival	2016	Young Cinema Award	Arrival	Won	
Venice Film Festival	2016	Golden Lion	Arrival	Nominated	
Writers Guild of America Awards	2022	Best Adapted Screenplay	Dune	Nominated	

== Critics associations ==
Organizations	Year	Category	Work	Result	Ref.
Alliance of Women Film Journalists	2016	Best Director	Arrival	Nominated	
Austin Film Critics Association	2016	Best Director	Arrival	Nominated	
Dallas–Fort Worth Film Critics Association	2015	Best Director	Sicario	5th Place	
Dallas–Fort Worth Film Critics Association	2016	Best Director	Arrival	5th Place	
Denver Film Critics Society	2017	Best Director	Arrival	Nominated	
Houston Film Critics Society	2017	Best Director	Arrival	Nominated	
National Board of Review	2013	Top Ten Films	Prisoners	Won	
National Board of Review	2015	Top Ten Films	Sicario	Won	
National Board of Review	2016	Top Ten Films	Arrival	Won	
National Board of Review	2021	Top Ten Films	Dune	Won	
Online Film Critics Society	2015	Best Director	Sicario	Nominated	
Online Film Critics Society	2017	Best Director	Arrival	Nominated	
San Francisco Film Critics Circle	2016	Best Director	Arrival	Nominated	
St. Louis Gateway Film Critics Association	2016	Best Director	Arrival	Runner-up (Note: Tied with Kenneth Lonergan for Manchester by the Sea)	
St. Louis Gateway Film Critics Association	2017	Best Director	Blade Runner 2049	Nominated	
Vancouver Film Critics Circle	2011	Best Director of a Canadian Film	Incendies	Won	
Vancouver Film Critics Circle	2015	Best Director of a Canadian Film	Enemy	Won	
Vancouver Film Critics Circle	2016	Best Director	Arrival	Nominated	
Washington D.C. Area Film Critics Association	2016	Best Director	Arrival	Nominated	
