= Out in That Deep Blue Sea =

- Directed by: Kazik Radwanski
- Written by: Kazik Radwanski
- Produced by: Daniel Montgomery
- Starring: Peter Bavis; Jeanne Souter; Carmen Craig; Marta Legrady; Joe Ring
- Cinematography: Daniel Voshart
- Edited by: Ajla Odobasic
- Production company: Medium Density Fiberboard Films
- Release date: September 10, 2009 (TIFF)
- Running time: 16 minutes
- Country: Canada
- Language: English

Out in That Deep Blue Sea is a 2009 Canadian drama short film, written and directed by Kazik Radwanski. The third film after Assault and Princess Margaret Blvd. in his trilogy of short films about people facing moments of personal crisis, the film centres on a middle-aged real estate agent who is becoming dissatisfied with the amount of time and energy he has invested into the corporate rat race.

The film was named to the Toronto International Film Festival's year-end Canada's Top Ten list for 2009, and received a Genie Award nomination for Best Live Action Short Drama at the 31st Genie Awards.
