= The Bridge (2004 film) =

2004 Canadian short film

- French: Le Pont
- Directed by: Guy Édoin
- Written by: Guy Édoin
- Produced by: Sylvain Corbeil; Pascal Bascaron
- Starring: Patrick Hivon; Catherine Bonneau
- Cinematography: Serge Desrosiers
- Edited by: Philippe Gagnon
- Music by: Pierre Benoit
- Production company: Metafilms
- Distributed by: Locomotion Distributions
- Release date: 2004
- Running time: 13 minutes
- Country: Canada
- Language: French

The Bridge (French: Le Pont) is a Canadian short drama film, directed by Guy Édoin and released in 2004. The first film in his "Les Affluents" trilogy of short films on rural themes, preceding The Dead Water (Les Eaux mortes) in 2006 and preceding Beyond the Walls (La Battue) in 2008, the film stars Patrick Hivon and Catherine Bonneau as a couple who are attempting to kill their disabled daughter under a bridge, only to have their plans disrupted when a farm girl (Sarah Gravel) crosses over the bridge walking her cow.

The film was a Prix Jutra nominee for Best Short Film at the 7th Jutra Awards in 2005.

All three films in the trilogy were subsequently released as bonus features on the DVD release of Édoin's feature film debut Wetlands (Marécages) in 2012.
