= The Real Shaolin =

- Directed by: Alexander Sebastien Lee
- Written by: Alexander Sebastien Lee; Nicholas Rucka
- Produced by: Yuri Lee; Mimi Lin
- Starring: Yuan Peng; Orion Lee; Zhu Hao Shan; Eric Guillou
- Cinematography: Alexander Sebastien Lee
- Edited by: Michael Shu
- Music by: Shigeru Umebayashi
- Release date: September 7, 2008 (Toronto)
- Running time: 89 minutes
- Countries: United States; China
- Languages: English; Mandarin; French

The Real Shaolin is a 2008 documentary film directed by Alexander Sebastien Lee. The Real Shaolin follows the story of two Chinese and two Westerners who journey to the Shaolin Temple in China, inspired by the legends portrayed in Kung Fu movies with Bruce Lee and Jet Li. In the course of excruciating martial arts training, their fantasies to become Kung Fu warriors collide with harsh reality, as the Shaolin Temple is the ultimate test for martial artists from all over the world.

The Real Shaolin had its World Premiere at the 2008 Toronto International Film Festival, and USA Premiere and winner of Special Jury Prize for Best Documentary at the 2009 Los Angeles Asian Pacific Film Festival. The Real Shaolin has played in festivals around the world including Hawaii International Film Festival, Doc NZ (New Zealand), Planet Doc Review (Poland), San Diego Asian Film Festival, and the DC Asian Pacific American Film Festival. In October 2009, The Real Shaolin premiered at New York City's IFC Center for the documentary screening series Stranger than Fiction.

The Real Shaolin was broadcast on television in France and Germany on Arte, in the Netherlands on Holland Doc 24, in Israel on Yes (Israel) Satellite TV, in Poland on Against Gravity, and on Air Canada flights.
