= Cutaway (2014 film) =

- Directed by: Kazik Radwanski
- Written by: Kazik Radwanski
- Produced by: Daniel Montgomery
- Cinematography: Nikolay Michaylov
- Production company: Medium Density Fiberboard Films
- Release date: August 12, 2014 (Locarno)
- Running time: 7 minutes
- Country: Canada

Cutaway is a 2014 Canadian drama short film, written and directed by Kazik Radwanski. Told entirely without spoken dialogue, the film depicts a day in a man's life entirely through a close focus on his hands, including his performance of physical labour and text conversations with his girlfriend.

The film was named to the Toronto International Film Festival's year-end Canada's Top Ten list for 2014.
