= 19 Months =

- Directed by: Randall Cole
- Written by: Randall Cole
- Produced by: James Mauro
- Starring: Benjamin Ratner; Angela Vint
- Cinematography: Harald Bachmann
- Edited by: Kathy Weinkauf
- Music by: Danny Friedman
- Production company: Cole/Mauro Productions Inc.
- Distributed by: ThinkFilm
- Release dates: 28 September 2002 (Vancouver); 21 May 2004 (Canada)
- Running time: 78 minutes
- Country: Canada
- Language: English

19 Months is a 2002 Canadian mockumentary film written and directed by Randall Cole, starring Benjamin Ratner and Angela Vint. It was Cole's directorial debut.

== Synopsis ==
Believing that all romantic partnerships turn sour, a couple decide to pre-emptively end their relationship with a perfect, amicable breakup – and agree to have a low-budget documentary film crew record it all. This includes seeing each other securely into new relationships with other people, so that neither will be left single.

== Cast ==
- Benjamin Ratner as Rob
- Angela Vint as Melanie
- Kari Matchett as Page
- Sergio Di Zio as Steve
- Carolyn Taylor as Lisa
- Marqus Bobesich as Glen
- Scott McLaren as The Interviewer
- Brooke D'Orsay as Sandy
- Tamara Levitt as Drunk Girl 1
- Chuck Shamata as Rob's Dad

== Production ==
The film was written and directed by Randall Cole, and is his first feature film. He began writing the script around 2001, inspired by articles which stated that love was the result of a chemical response that faded over time. It was about 80% scripted and 20% improvised.

The film was produced through the Feature Film Project of the Canadian Film Centre, which provided a $500,000 budget. The production received assistance from Telefilm Canada and the Ontario Media Development Corporation.

The film was shot over 15 days in Toronto and is set there, using iconic Toronto locations. Actors are often filmed in close-up, which helped avoid the time and expense of set design and location dressing.

== Release ==
The film opened in theatres in Canada on 21 May 2004.

== Reception ==
Film critic Ken Eisner called the film a "smart, highly entertaining" mockumentary with "funny and provocative results", and praised the performances of the cast. Wendy Banks of Now gave the film an "honourable mention" and called it a "mercilessly funny and astute satire of contemporary relationships." Vanessa Farquharson drew comparisons to Annie Hall with the "obsessive-compulsive male and frustrated, fey female lead".

Katherine Monk of the Vancouver Sun gave the film a rating of 3 stars out of 5, calling it "highly believable", and wrote that the actors "sell every line". Susan Walker of the Toronto Star called the film a "smart script driving some intense performances."

Erin Oke of Exclaim! wrote that the film "offers nothing new or interesting to the genre" and called the characters "almost impossible to care about".
