= McLaren's Negatives =

- Directed by: Marie-Josée Saint-Pierre
- Written by: Marie-Josée Saint-Pierre
- Produced by: Marie-Josée Saint-Pierre
- Starring: Patrick Coutu
- Cinematography: Brigitte Archambault; Marie-Josée Saint-Pierre
- Edited by: Kara Blake
- Music by: Dominique Cote; Tyler Mauney; Adam O'Callaghan
- Production company: MJSTP Films
- Distributed by: National Film Board of Canada; Videographe Inc.
- Release date: June 1, 2006 (Annecy Animation Film Festival)
- Running time: 10 minutes
- Country: Canada
- Language: English

McLaren's Negatives is a 2006 short animated documentary directed by French Canadian filmmaker Marie-Josée Saint-Pierre. The film is a study of the Canadian animator Norman McLaren, and his personal view of film making. The short film won several awards, including the 2007 Jutra Award for best animated short film.

== Cast ==
| Actor | Role |
|---|---|
| Patrick Coutu | Norman |

== Awards ==
- JUTRA for Best Animated Film 2007 (Québec)
- Sterling Short Honorable Mention, Silverdocs 2006 (USA)
- Best Debut Film, Animation, Message to Man International Film Festival 2006 (Russia)
- Best Short Contemporary Film, Sapporo International Shortfest 2006 (Japan)
- Bar in Gold, Festival Der Nationen 2006 (Austria)
- Best Short Documentary Film, Animation Block Party New York 2006 (USA)
- Best Animation Film, Dokufest 2006 (Kosovo)
- Best International Documentary, Santiago International Short Film Festival 2006 (Chile)
- Best Director Animation, Monstramundo 2006 (Brazil)
- Best Script Animation, Monstramundo 2006 (Brazil)
- Youth Jury Award for Most Inspirational Short Film, Real 2 Real International Film Festival for Youth 2007 (Canada)
- First Prize in the Documentary Section, 10 Mostra Internacional de Curtmetratges de Sagunt 2007 (Spain)
- Best Documentary, PA Film Institute Festival 2007 (USA)
- Platinum Remi, Best Animation, Worldfest Houston 2007 (USA)
- Special Jury Prize, Outstanding Direction Documentary, Indianapolis Film Festival 2007 (USA)
- Best Documentary, Arizona International Film Festival 2007 (USA)
- Special Jury Award for Best Animated Film, Ismailia International Film Festival 2007 (Egypt)
- Best Documentary, FILMETS Badalona Festival 2007 (Spain)
- Honorable Mention, Best Short International Film, Festival International de Curtas de Belo Horizonte 2006 (Brazil)
- Honorable Mention, International Animation Competition, Monterrey International Festival 2006 (Mexico)
- Special Mention Animation, Seddicorto International Festival 2006 (Italia)
- Special Mention Animation, Luciana Film Festival 2006 (Italia)

== See also ==
- Ryan
