= Robert Middlemiss =

Canadian engineer and politician

Member of the National Assembly of Quebec for Pontiac
- In office April 13, 1981 – April 14, 2003
- Preceded by: Jean-Guy Larivière
- Succeeded by: Charlotte L'Écuyer

Personal details
- Born: January 8, 1935 Aylmer, Quebec
- Died: May 28, 2010 (aged 75) Gatineau, Quebec
- Party: Quebec Liberal Party
- Spouse(s): Lorraine St-Louis (1958-2010)

Robert Middlemiss (January 8, 1935 – May 28, 2010) was an engineer and politician from Quebec, who served in the Robert Bourassa and Daniel Johnson Jr. governments.

== Biography ==
Middlemiss was born in Aylmer, Quebec to William Middlemiss, a civil servant, and Imelda Cardinal. He studied at the University of Ottawa and McGill University, obtaining a Bachelor of Applied Science from the latter institution in 1961. He worked as a geotechnical engineer from 1961 to 1981.

== Political career ==
From 1970 until 1979, Middlemiss was an elected alderman for Aylmer. In 1981, his friend Michel Gratton convinced him to be a Liberal candidate in Pontiac, a newly reformed riding that now included the territory of Aylmer.

Being born of an anglophone father and a French-speaking mother, he had the advantage of being equally at ease in both communities. On his first attempt, in 1981, he was elected easily; however, the Liberal Party under leader Claude Ryan formed the opposition. Middlemiss was re-elected four times and never faced a serious challenge in the heavily federalist riding, only once dipping below 50% in 1989 due to the English-speaking minority rights Equality Party challenging the Liberal Government over the invocation of the notwithstanding clause of the Canadian Charter of Rights and Freedoms to override a Supreme Court of Canada ruling overturning parts of the Charter of the French Language.

In 1985, the Liberals regained power with Robert Bourassa at the head of the party. However, Middlemiss did not enter the Cabinet until 1989. He was named Minister for Agriculture, Fisheries and Food. On October 5, 1990, he became Minister of Transport, and on January 11, 1994, when Bourassa was replaced by the short-lived government of Daniel Johnson Jr., he was appointed Minister of Public Safety.

== Final years ==
Middlemiss did not run for re-election in 2003. He died in Gatineau, Quebec from cancer on May 28, 2010.
