= 388 Arletta Avenue =

- Directed by: Randall Cole
- Written by: Randall Cole
- Produced by: Steve Hoban; Mark Smith
- Starring: Nick Stahl; Mia Kirshner; Devon Sawa
- Cinematography: Gavin Smith
- Edited by: Kathy Weinkauf
- Production company: Copperheart Entertainment
- Distributed by: Entertainment One
- Release date: 11 September 2011 (TIFF)
- Running time: 86 minutes
- Country: Canada
- Language: English

388 Arletta Avenue is a 2011 Canadian horror-thriller film written and directed by Randall Cole and starring Nick Stahl and Mia Kirshner as an unhappily married couple who are unknowingly stalked by an intruder. It premiered at the 2011 Toronto International Film Festival, had a limited release in Canada in June 2012, and was released on DVD in September 2012.

== Plot ==
An unidentified stalker records video of married couple James and Amy Deakin as they hide their spare key outside their home. When the couple leaves to go jogging, he uses the key to enter their home and set up hidden security cameras in each room. He also makes subtle changes, such as setting their alarm to go off earlier and leaving a mix CD in their car. Amy protests when the alarm wakes her up early, and the two argue over who recorded the mix CD. When James finds the audio tracks on his computer, Amy considers the mystery solved, but James insists that he never downloaded them. As they argue, James dismisses Amy's PhD research on Afghan culture as a waste of time, and she refuses to speak to him. The next morning, as James leaves for work, he writes her a brief apology. The stalker enters the house, reads the note, and records video of Amy's reaction to noise that she hears in the house.

When James returns home, he finds a note ostensibly written in Amy's handwriting in which she says that she has left to clear her head. James attempts to contact Amy many times, but she does not answer her calls. Worried, he calls her friends, including Amy's sister Katherine, with whom he has an antagonistic relationship. James refuses to explain the situation to Katherine, and she becomes suspicious that something has happened between Amy and James. James eventually turns to his friend Alex, who suggests that their childhood acquaintance Bill may be involved. James contacts Bill, an Afghanistan veteran who now works nights at an animal shelter, and he apologizes for tormenting Bill mercilessly during their school years. Although Bill accepts both the apology and a gift, a collectable baseball, he says little except that the apology does not negate the bullying.

Later, James comes to believe that his cat has been replaced when he receives taunting e-mails and the cat exhibits uncharacteristic behavior. A police officer files a report but does not take James' claims seriously. When James finds the remains of his decapitated cat and video surveillance evidence that an intruder entered his home, he contacts the police again, but the police remain skeptical, as the cat's remains have gone missing. Convinced that the police will not act, James investigates the matter himself. James receives a brief video that shows Amy bound and gagged before it deletes itself. Frustrated, James demands the unseen antagonist reveal himself; immediately afterward, the collectable baseball is thrown through one of his windows, which initiates a violent confrontation between James and Bill. Hidden video surveillance later depicts James as he digs a shallow grave.

James becomes erratic and paranoid, and, with Alex's help, he illegally purchases a handgun. Katherine becomes increasingly suspicious of James and threatens to call the police, which James laughs off. James attempts to make contact with his unseen stalker, who intentionally reveals himself as being in the house. After a brief chase, James offers a deal: for Amy's safe return, James will stop investigating and not further contact the police. At work the next day, James receives video footage of Amy asleep in their bed. James leaves for his house at the same time that Alex, Katherine, and a policeman arrive. As Katherine discovers Amy's body hidden in the basement, James attempts to confront the stalker, only to realize that he has been framed for her murder. While still holding the pistol, James attempts to explain the situation, and the police officer shoots him dead. In his home, the still-unidentified stalker labels his surveillance tape as "388 Arletta Avenue" and sets it beside several other tapes. He then starts the cycle again with a new family.

== Cast ==
- Nick Stahl as James
- Mia Kirshner as Amy
- Devon Sawa as Bill
- Aaron Abrams as Alex
- Charlotte Sullivan as Sherry
- Krista Bridges as Katherine
- Gerry Dee as Boss
- Kyle Labine as Co-Worker #1
- David Reale as Co-Worker #2

== Production ==
Vincenzo Natali and Steve Hoban, who had previously collaborated on Splice, served as executive producer and producer, respectively. Natali was drawn to the film due to the script. He said that his role in the film was minor – to offer assistance when needed. Production began in Toronto, Ontario, Canada, in December 2010. Writer-director Randall Cole used his own life experiences as inspiration for some of the film's events. Cole wanted to show the downsides of increasing openness and surveillance in our lives, and he was drawn to the idea of an antagonist that documents a manipulated character study.

== Release ==
388 Arletta Avenue premiered at the 2011 Toronto International Film Festival. It had a limited release in Canada on 15 June 2012 and was released on DVD on 25 September 2012.

== Reception ==
Rotten Tomatoes, a review aggregator, reports that 56% of nine surveyed critics gave the film a positive review; the average rating was 5.64/10. Liam Lacey of The Globe and Mail rated it 3/4 stars and called it a "political horror movie" that "provide[s] a timely commentary on supposedly safe homes and distant wars." Peter Howell of The Toronto Star rated it 3/4 stars and wrote, "388 Arletta Avenue is a superior chiller that speaks to modern fears." John Anderson of Variety wrote that the film is "a taut, often ingenious thriller" for as long as it stays focused on its gimmick, a couple stalked via constant surveillance. Martyn Conterio of Little White Lies wrote that the film's only shock comes from Vincenzo Natali's involvement. Conterio called the film "a very poor effort within the increasingly irrelevant found footage subgenre". Darryl Loomis of DVD Verdict wrote that the film rises above its gimmick, a combination of found footage and home invasion film, to deliver "a solid story with a whole lot of tension". Rohit Rao of DVD Talk rated it 2.5/5 stars and wrote, "388 Arletta Avenue is built around an interesting idea but its execution suffers from lapses in logic and an unsatisfying ending."

== See also ==
- List of films featuring home invasions
