= Jutra (film) =

- Directed by: Marie-Josée Saint-Pierre
- Written by: Marie-Josée Saint-Pierre
- Produced by: Marc Bertrand; René Chénier; Marie-Josée Saint-Pierre
- Starring: Claude Jutra
- Edited by: Oana Suteu
- Music by: Jim Solkin
- Production company: MJSTP Films
- Distributed by: National Film Board of Canada
- Release date: 2014
- Running time: 13 minutes
- Country: Canada
- Language: French

Jutra is a Canadian short documentary film, directed by Marie-Josée Saint-Pierre and released in 2014. Blending live action with animation, the film is a portrait of influential Quebec filmmaker Claude Jutra, structured as an interview in which Jutra is both the questioner and the interview guest.

The film premiered at the Saguenay International Short Film Festival in March 2014. It was subsequently screened at the 2014 Cannes Film Festival in the Director's Fortnight stream.

The film won the Canadian Screen Award for Best Short Documentary Film at the 3rd Canadian Screen Awards, and the Prix Jutra for Best Animated Short Film at the 17th Jutra Awards.
