= Tower (2012 Canadian film) =

- Film poster
- Directed by: Kazik Radwanski
- Written by: Kazik Radwanski
- Produced by: Daniel Montgomery
- Starring: Derek Bogart; Nicole Fairbairn; Deborah Sawyer
- Cinematography: Daniel Voshart
- Edited by: Ajla Odobasic
- Music by: Johnny Hockin; Gabe Knox
- Production company: Medium Density Fibreboard Films
- Release date: August 10, 2012 (Locarno)
- Running time: 78 minutes
- Country: Canada
- Language: English

Tower is a 2012 Canadian drama film, written and directed by Kazik Radwanski. Radwanski's feature directorial debut, the film follows a socially awkward Torontonian named Derek. The film had its world premiere at the 2012 Locarno Film Festival, followed by its North American premiere at the 2012 Toronto International Film Festival.

== Cast ==
- Derek Bogart as Derek, a socially awkward loner motivated by his personal obsessions.

== Critical response ==
The film was met with critical acclaim upon its release. The Wall Street Journal proclaimed it as "thoroughly compelling, juxtaposing idiosyncratic camerawork with raw insight into the sort of person everyone knows", while Eric Kohn of IndieWire described the protagonist as "an awkward loner made mesmerizing", and Scott Foundas for the Village Voice described it as "a Sisyphus for the Asperger’s era".

Now named Tower one of the "Top 25 Toronto Films" of all time.
