= Alexander Sebastien Lee =

American film director

Alexander Sebastien Lee is an American filmmaker born and raised in Los Angeles, California. Lee was exposed from an early age to the films of Akira Kurosawa, Zhang Yimou, and Claude Berri. In his teens, Lee studied theater in London at the Royal Academy of Dramatic Arts, and at age 18, he lived in Paris and studied French language, French civilization and art history at the Paris-Sorbonne University. Lee later returned to Los Angeles and studied film production at the USC School of Cinematic Arts

An avid martial artist, after graduation Lee journeyed to the Shaolin Temple in China to train in Kung Fu for several months. Lee's expectations of the legendary temple differed greatly from what he found. Lee's experience forged an idea to film a documentary that demystifies the modern day Shaolin Temple. Lee's feature debut, entitled The Real Shaolin, had its world premiere at the 2008 Toronto International Film Festival. The Real Shaolin won the Special Jury Prize for Best Documentary at the 2009 Los Angeles Asian Pacific Film Festival
