= David Gatten =

American film director

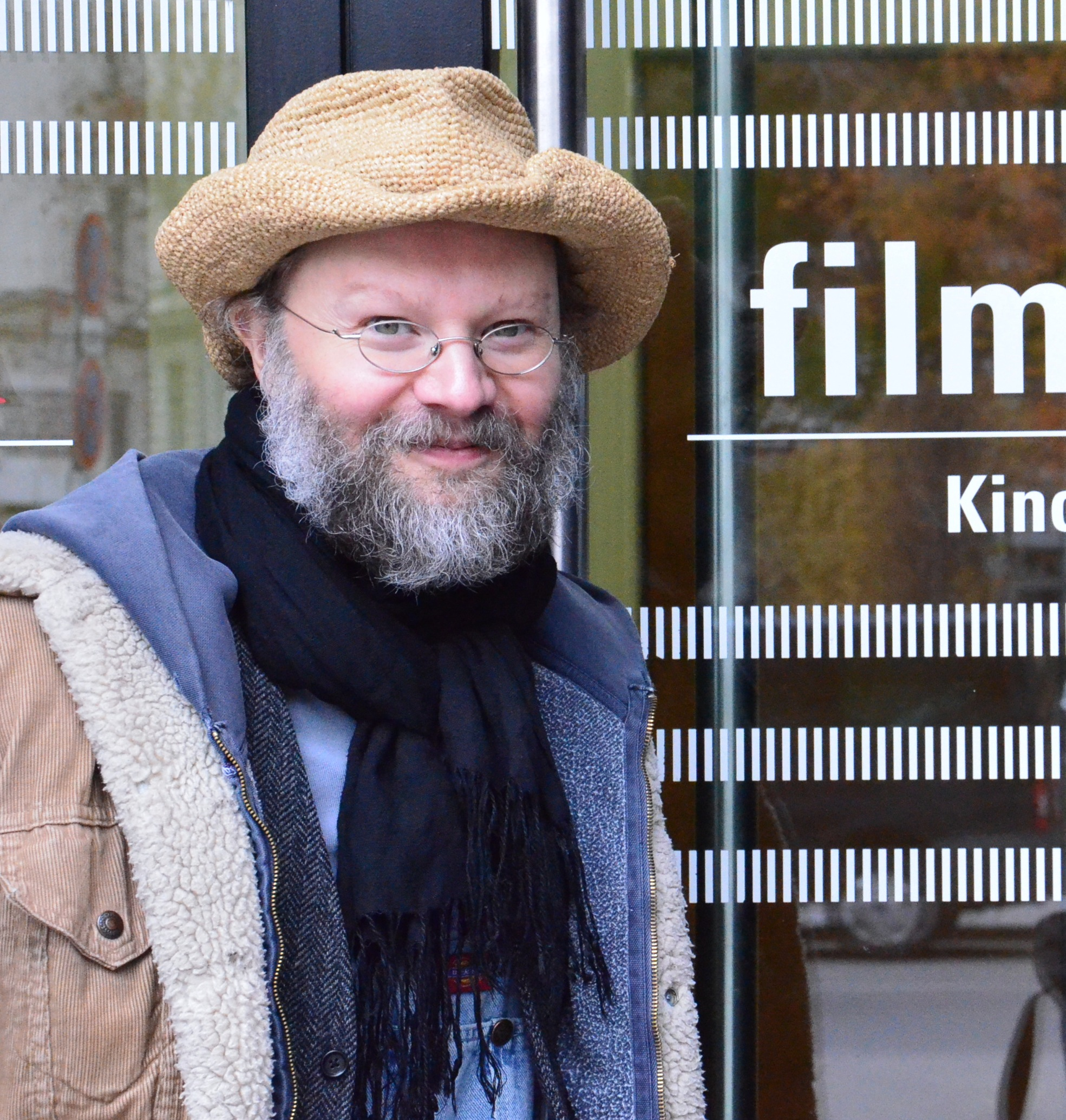
- David Gatten at the Austrian Film Museum, 2017
- Born: February 11, 1971 (age 55); Ann Arbor, Michigan
- Known for: Filmmaking and Teaching
- Spouse: Erin Espelie (m. 2010)
- Children: 1

David Edward Gatten (Born February 11, 1971 Ann Arbor, Michigan) is an American experimental filmmaker and moving image artist. Since 1996 Gatten's films have explored the intersection of the printed word and moving image, cataloging the variety of ways in which texts functions in cinema as both language and image, often blurring the boundary between these categories. His 16mm films often employee cameraless techniques, combined with close-up cinematography and optical printing processes. In addition to the ongoing 16mm films, Gatten is now making hybrid 16mm/digital works and has completed an entirely digital feature-length project called The Extravagant Shadows.

His latest work, 'The Spirit Lamp', is a tribute to David Lynch co-created with actress/singer Chrystabell. It's a performance that contains songs written by Lynch and Chrystabell, accompanied by original 16mm images by David Gatten. The performance begins with three minutes of David Lynch's voice, introducing Chrystabell in the form of a love story. It started as a performance in 2025's edition of the Cannes Film Festival, and now has expanded into a series of performances, starting at 'A Gathering of the Angels' in London.

In a 2025 International Critics & Directors poll he was ranked No.8 out of over 500 artists on the list of the 50 Best Experimental Filmmakers of the 21st Century, with three of his movies included on the 50 Best Experimental Films of the Century.

Among other projects, he is currently working on a series of films entitled Secret History of the Dividing Line, a True Account in Nine Parts, a project which Artforum magazine called "one of the most erudite and ambitious undertakings in recent cinema." He was awarded a Guggenheim Fellowship in 2005 to continue work on this series of films exploring the library of William Byrd II of Westover (1674–1744) and the lives of William Byrd and his daughter Evelyn Byrd (1707–1737).

In November 2011 Texts of Light: A Mid-Career Retrospective of Fourteen Films by David Gatten, curated by Chris Stults, opened at the Wexner Center for the Arts. The three program retrospective screened in 2012 at the National Gallery of Art in Washington, DC; Harvard Film Archive; San Francisco Museum of Modern Art and other venues in San Francesco; and at REDCAT, The LA Film Forum, and The Velaslavasay Panorama in Los Angeles.

One of his most celebrated works, The Extravagant Shadows, is a 175-minute work of high-definition digital cinema. It premiered at Lincoln Center in the 2012 edition of the New York Film Festival. The Extravagant Shadows was named one of the "Top 10 Undistributed Movies of 2012" by a Film Comment international film critics poll magazine.

His work has also been part of retrospectives at the 2015 edition of the PLASTIK Festival in Dublin, as well as at the National Museum of Modern and Contemporary Art in Seoul, South Korea, back in 2017.

== Biography ==
Gatten was born on February 11, 1971, in Ann Arbor, Michigan, to Robert and Florence Gatten. He lived in Michigan and Ohio until 1978, when the family moved to Greensboro, North Carolina. Gatten's interest in the moving image originated in the mid-1980s, while in junior high school, when he began writing video game software with the TRS-80 operating system.

He graduated from the University of North Carolina at Greensboro with a BA in Media Studies and Art History. Gatten received his MFA from the School of the Art Institute of Chicago in 1998, where he studied with Tatsu Aoki, Daniel Eisenberg and Shellie Fleming. He is married to the filmmaker and writer Erin Espelie. They live together in the historic mining camp of Salina, Colorado, in Four Mile Canyon, Boulder County, with their daughter, Darwin Salina Gatten-Espelie.

== Teaching ==
Starting in 1998 Gatten taught in the Filmmaking Department at the School of the Art Institute of Chicago. In 1999 he accepted a professorship at Ithaca College, where he was promoted to Associate Professor and granted tenure in 2004. From 2006-2009 Gatten was a visiting artist at the Cooper Union for the Advancement of Science & Art in New York City. In 2010 Gatten accepted a visiting professorship at Duke University where he taught until 2015.

Gatten joined the faculty of the Department of Cinema Studies & Moving Image Arts at the University of Colorado at Boulder as a tenured full professor in 2015. He officially retired from academic life in 2023 to spend more time in the studio on larger film projects. He will return to the classroom by special request in the Fall of 2025 to teach an updated version of his course 'David Lynch and the Cinema of Enchantment & Disturbance'.

== Early work ==
To produce What the Water Said, Nos.1-3, Gatten placed unexposed rolls of camera film in crab traps in the Atlantic Ocean off the South Carolina coast. The resulting sounds and images were produced by the physical and chemical interactions between the film's emulsion and the surrounding salt water, sand, rocks, crabs, fish, and underwater creatures.

Gatten's previous film, Hardwood Process, takes the shape of a diary and also explored the "secret writing" of nature, combined with hand-processing of the 16mm film stock, use of natural dyes, toners, chemical treatments, optical and contact printing. Gatten's rarely-screened first film, Silver Align, is a portrait of one of Gatten's mentors, the filmmaker Zack Stiglicz, filming on the shore of Lake Michigan.

== Secret History Of The Dividing Line cycle ==
Since 1996, Gatten has been at work on a nine-part film series that takes as inspiration the 4,000-volume library of William Byrd II, an American colonial writer, planter, and government official. The individual films explore one or more titles from the library while also elliptically describing episodes in the lives of Byrd and his daughter Evelyn. At least four parts were completed; the fifth part was in progress between 2005 and 2009. Curator and writer Henriette Huldisch described the cycle as follows: "Focusing on specific volumes from the library, letters, and personal papers, Gatten's series probes the relationship between printed words and images, philosophical ideas, historical records, and biography. Throughout, his thematic concerns are realized in an array of cinematic processes and techniques, constituting a parallel survey of the medium's history."

The second film in the cycle, The Great Art of Knowing, is generally regarded at Gatten's most important film and was listed among the "50 Best Films of the Decade" in a 2010 Film Comment critics poll.

The series has been credited as having a "unique approach" to biography, and the films have been compared to the works of artists Agnes Martin and Marcel Broodthaers; filmmakers Hollis Frampton, Nathaniel Dorsky, Robert Beavers and Stan Brakhage; poets Susan Howe and e.e. cummings; and philosophers Gilles Deleuze and Ludwig Wittgenstein.

Portions of the cycle have been included in the 2002 and 2006 Whitney Biennial exhibitions and in 2011 all four completed parts were included in "The Unfinished Film" exhibition at the Gladstone Gallery, alongside works by Joseph Cornell, Sergei Eisenstein, Jean-Luc Godard, Dziga Vertov, and Andy Warhol.

== Recent film series ==
In addition to the Secret History films, Gatten is working on two additional film series, one under the umbrella title Films for Invisible Ink, and including the films Case No. 71: Base-Plus-Fog and Case No. 142: Abbreviation for Dead Winter [diminished by 1,794], as well as "the wedding vows film" Case No. 323: Once upon a Time in the West.

Another series titled Continuous Quantities, that includes the films Journal and Remarks, filmed on the Galapagos Islands and Shrimp Boat Log. Based on an entry from Leonardo da Vinci's Notebooks, the Continuous Quantities films are composed of shots 29 frames (1.2 seconds) in length.

== Recent work and exhibition ==
In 2015 Gatten was invited to become part of the international practiced-based research project "RESET THE APPARATUS!" based in Vienna, Austria. The final work of that project was the film The Heart is the Residence of the Spirit, which premiered in 2019.

A hybrid 16mm/HD piece, By Pain and Rhyme and Arabesques of Foraging premiered at the British Film Institute in the London Film Festival and nominated for the Tiger award at the International Film Festival Rotterdam.

== Filmography ==
- Silver Align (1995)
- Hardwood Process (1996)
- What the Water Said, nos. 1–3 (1998)
- Moxon's Mechanick Exercises or the Doctrine of Handy-works applied to the Art of Printing (1999)
- The Enjoyment of Reading (2001)
- Secret History of the Dividing Line (2002)
- Fragrant Portals, Bright Particulars and the Edge of Space (2003)
- The Great Art of Knowing (2004)
- Film for Invisible Ink case no. 71: Base-Plus-Fog (2006)
- What the Water Said, nos. 4–6 (2007)
- How to Conduct A Love Affair (2007)
- Today! (excerpts) (with Jessie Stead) (2008)
- Today! (excerpts #28 and #19) (with Jessie Stead) (2008)
- Film for Invisible Ink case no. 142: Abbreviation for Dead Winter [Diminished by 1,794] (2008)
- Journal and Remarks (2009)
- Ordinary Time, Equivocal Inventory (2009)
- So Sure of Nowhere Buying Times to Come (2010)
- Shrimp Boat Log (2006/2010)
- Film for Invisible Ink case no. 323: Once upon a Time in the West (2010)
- The Matter Propounded, of its Possibility or Impossibility, Treated in four Parts (2011)
- By Pain and Rhyme and Arabesques of Foraging (2012)
- The Extravagant Shadows (2012)
- What Places of Heaven, What Planets Directed, How Long the Effects? or, The General Accidents of the World (2013)
- Crossing Brooklyn Ferry (2015)
- Narrow Rivers, Open Seas & Seventeen Sunsets (Silences for A Merchant Mariner) (2016)
- Devotions Upon Emergent Occasions (2016)
- China monumentis (A Roll for Peter) (2016)
- The Heart is the Residence of the Spirit (2019)
- This Day's Madness did prepare Tomorrow's Silence (with Ashley West) (2021)
- The Spirit Lamp (with Chrystabell) (2025)
