= Green Door (film) =

2008 Canadian short film

- Directed by: Semi Chellas
- Written by: Barbara Gowdy
- Produced by: Sonia Hosko; Stephanie Markowitz
- Starring: Don McKellar; Tracy Wright; Sabrina Grdevich
- Cinematography: David Franco
- Edited by: Sandy Pereira; David Wharnsby
- Music by: Ron Sures
- Production company: Foundry Films
- Release date: September 7, 2008 (TIFF)
- Running time: 13 minutes
- Country: Canada
- Language: English

Green Door is a Canadian short comedy film, directed by Semi Chellas and released in 2008. Written by Barbara Gowdy, the film centres on the interactions between various residents of an apartment building, alternating between romantic comedy, mistaken identity farce and black comedy.

The cast includes Don McKellar as Ron, Sabrina Grdevich as Brenda, Tracy Wright as Rhonda, Matt Gordon as Bob, Joris Jarsky as Rob, Matt Hopkins as Darrell, Amy Rutherford as Marilyn, and Matthew Edison and Matt Steinberg as paramedics.

The film premiered at the 2008 Toronto International Film Festival.

The film was named to TIFF's annual year-end Canada's Top Ten list for 2008.
