= Gabriel Maillé =

Canadian film and television actor

Gabriel Maillé (born 20 December 1995) is a Canadian film and television actor who started as a child actor.

Maillé appeared in feature films It's Not Me, I Swear! (C'est pas moi, je le jure!) and 1981 before appearing in a lead role in Wetlands (Marécages).

Maillé started early with roles in theater and films including in 2004 Dans une galaxie près de chez vous by Claude Desrosiers and small roles in La Promesse in 2003 and Temps durs and Pure Laine in 2004.

In 2009, he portrayed Jérôme, as Léon's big brother, in It's Not Me, I Swear! (C'est pas moi, je le jure!) by Philippe Falardeau. The same year, he appeared in the latest feature by Ricardo Trogi, 1981. His lead role in Wetlands (Marécages) is his biggest role on the screen as yet.

He was also in the television series Yamaska broadcast on the Quebec television station TVA as Frédérick Harrison for three consecutive seasons. He has also appeared on Le Club des doigts croisés in 2009-2010, a youth series produced by "La Presse Télé" and shown on Radio-Canada.

== Filmography ==
- 2008: It's Not Me, I Swear! (C'est pas moi, je le jure!) as Jérôme Doré
- 2009: 1981 as Jérôme
- 2009-2011: Yamaska as Frédérick Harrison (in 19 episodes)
- 2011: Wetlands (Marécages) as Simon
