= Block B (film) =

- Directed by: Chris Chong Chan Fui
- Written by: Toni Kassim
- Produced by: Chris Chong Chan Fui
- Starring: Shanthini Venugopal
- Cinematography: Yuk Hoy Cheong
- Edited by: Lee Chatametikool
- Production company: Tanjung Aru Pictures
- Release date: September 9, 2008 (TIFF)
- Running time: 20 minutes
- Country: Canada
- Language: Tamil

Block B is a Malaysian-Canadian experimental short film, directed by Chris Chong Chan Fui and released in 2008. A meditation on urban living, the film consists of a static shot of an apartment block in Kuala Lumpur, as the sounds and dialogue of the city pass by disconnected from the ability to see where any given sound is coming from.

The film premiered at the 2008 Toronto International Film Festival, where it won the award for Best Canadian Short Film. His film Pool had won the same award the previous year, making Chong the first director in the award's history to win the award in two consecutive years. It was later named to TIFF's annual year-end Canada's Top Ten list of the year's best Canadian short films.
