= Chris Chong Chan Fui =

Malaysian artist and filmmaker

Chris Chong
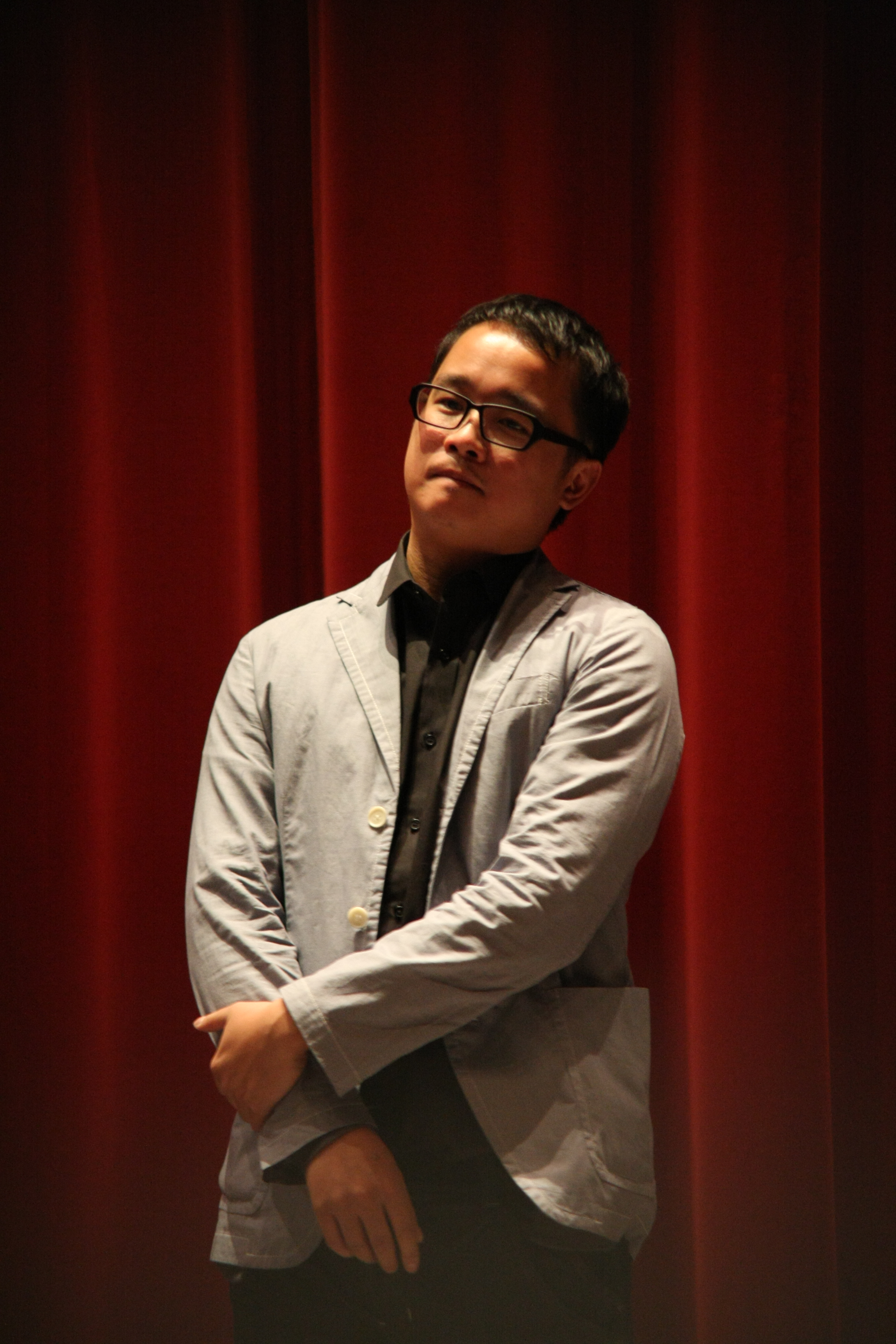
- Chong at TIFF 2009
- Education: University of Calgary

Chris Chong Chan Fui is a Malaysian artist and filmmaker, who has worked in both Malaysia and Canada. He is most noted for his short films Pool (Kolam), which won the Toronto International Film Festival Award for Best Canadian Short Film at the 2007 Toronto International Film Festival, and Block B, which won the same award at the 2008 Toronto International Film Festival.

Both films were also named to TIFF's annual year-end Canada's Top Ten list of the year's best Canadian short films in their respective years.

Originally from Borneo, Chong lived and worked in Canada for a number of years after attending the University of Calgary as an international student. Prior to Pool, he made the short films Crash Skid Love (1999), Minus (2000) and Tuesday Be My Friend (2006). Although both Pool and Block B were made while Chong was still based in Canada, he had returned to Malaysia by the time of his 2009 feature film debut Karaoke. The film premiered in the Directors' Fortnight stream at the 2009 Cannes Film Festival; and later won the Mavericks Award at the 2009 Calgary International Film Festival.

He has since concentrated primarily on art, including work in photography, painting and video installation.
