= Passages (2008 film) =

- Directed by: Marie-Josée Saint-Pierre
- Written by: Marie-Josée Saint-Pierre
- Produced by: Marie-Josée Saint-Pierre
- Edited by: Kara Blake; Marie-Josée Saint-Pierre
- Animation by: Brigitte Archambault
- Production company: MJSTP Films
- Distributed by: National Film Board of Canada
- Release date: September 10, 2008 (TIFF)
- Running time: 24 minutes
- Country: Canada
- Language: French

Passages is a Canadian short documentary film, directed by Marie-Josée Saint-Pierre and released in 2008. Using animation, the film retells the story of the difficult birth of her own daughter Fiona, and the medical complications that potentially threatened her own life.

The film premiered at the 2008 Toronto International Film Festival.

The film was named to TIFF's year-end Canada's Top Ten list for short films in 2008. It subsequently received a Genie Award nomination for Best Short Documentary at the 30th Genie Awards in 2010.
