= Charlotte L'Écuyer =

Canadian politician (1943–2021)

Charlotte L'Ecuyer

MNA for Pontiac
- In office 1 May 2003 – 2014
- Preceded by: Robert Middlemiss
- Succeeded by: André Fortin

Personal details
- Born: August 16, 1943 Smooth Rock Falls, Ontario
- Died: February 1, 2021 (aged 77)
- Party: Quebec Liberal Party
- Portfolio: Agriculture, Fisheries, Food

Charlotte L'Écuyer (16 August 1943 – 1 February 2021) was a politician in Quebec, Canada. She was a Member of the National Assembly of Quebec (MNA) for the riding of Pontiac in Western Quebec, and a member of the Quebec Liberal Party caucus, from 2003 to 2014.

== Biography ==
L'Écuyer went to the Université du Québec à Hull (now Université du Québec en Outaouais) and obtained a bachelor's degree in social work. She would later add a master's degree in social work at the Université de Sherbrooke.

L'Écuyer was a social worker and the former general manager of the Pontiac's CLSC clinic. She was also an administration member for several health and social services associations in the Pontiac region. She was also an administration member to the Centre local de développement de la MRC du Pontiac.

L'Écuyer won her first election in the 2003 election, replacing Robert Middlemiss, who held the seat for several years. After the departure of Chambly MNA Diane Legault, L'Écuyer was named the Parliamentary Secretary for Health Minister Philippe Couillard until 2007. During her first term, she was featured in the film Chers électeurs.

During the 2007 election campaign, while the Outaouais region was in the midst of a severe doctor shortage, she mentioned in an interview with local media reporters that not everyone in the region needs a family doctor.

Despite losing 18% of the popular vote from the last election, she won a second term ahead of Parti Québécois candidate Patrick Robert-Meunier and the Action democratique du Quebec's (ADQ) Victor Bilodeau. She died on February 1, 2021.
