= Angela Vint =

Canadian actress

Angela Vint is a Canadian actress. She is most noted for her television role as Ziggy McLeod in Traders, for which she was a Gemini Award nominee for Best Supporting Actress in a Drama Program or Series at the 15th Gemini Awards in 2000.

== Early life and education ==
A native of Oshawa, Ontario, she is a graduate of the theatre program at York University.

== Career ==
Vint starred in the films 19 Months (2004) and The Baby Formula (2008). She has also appeared in supporting or guest roles in the films The Hunt for the Unicorn Killer, The Safety of Objects, Prince Charming, The Vow and Lars and the Real Girl, and the television series Blue Murder, This Is Wonderland, Across the River to Motor City, Flashpoint, Murdoch Mysteries and The Handmaid's Tale.

== Filmography ==
=== Film ===
| Year | Title | Role | Notes |
|---|---|---|---|
| 1998 | Urban Legend | Bitchy Girl | |
| 2000 | Washed Up | Stacy #2 | |
| 2001 | The Safety of Objects | Tina | |
| 2002 | 19 Months | Melanie | |
| 2007 | Lars and the Real Girl | Sandy | |
| 2008 | The Baby Formula | Athena | |
| 2012 | The Vow | Nurse | |
| 2016 | Miss Sloane | Brenda Patterson | |
| 2017 | Shimmer Lake | Martha Sikes | |

=== Television ===
| Year | Title | Role | Notes |
|---|---|---|---|
| 1996–2000 | Traders | Ziggy McLeod | 64 episodes |
| 1997 | La Femme Nikita | Ginger | Episode: "Noise" |
| 1997 | Elvis Meets Nixon | Stewardess Pamela | Television film |
| 1997 | The Third Twin | Jogger #2 | Television film |
| 1999 | Dangerous Evidence | Bobby Weinberger | Television film |
| 1999 | The Hunt for the Unicorn Killer | Mary Maddux | Television film |
| 1999 | Psi Factor | Cheryl Hawkins | Episode: "Sacrifices" |
| 2000 | Deliberate Intent | Cindy | Television film |
| 2000 | Earth: Final Conflict | Nurse | Episode: "The Forge of Creation" |
| 2001 | Twice in a Lifetime | Fran | Episode: "Daddy's Girl" |
| 2001 | Prince Charming | Waitress | Television film |
| 2001, 2003 | Blue Murder | Det. Blackburn / Chantal Birk | 2 episodes |
| 2002 | Soul Food | Samantha Tucker | 3 episodes |
| 2002–2003 | Mercy Peak | Helen Blakemore | 10 episodes |
| 2003 | Playmakers | Coach's Daughter | Episode: "Talk Radio" |
| 2004–2006 | This Is Wonderland | Tamara Rogan / Erin Tillson | 21 episodes |
| 2005 | ReGenesis | RCMP Officer | Episode: "The Longest Night" |
| 2005 | Slatland | Margit Bergen | Television film |
| 2007 | Across the River to Motor City | Lauralee Barton | 2 episodes |
| 2009 | Da Kink in My Hair | Judith | Episode: "Playing Social" |
| 2010 | Bloodletting & Miraculous Cures | Mrs. Sanger | Episode: "The Missing Years" |
| 2010 | Flashpoint | Sgt. Jasmine Morello | Episode: "Jumping at Shadows" |
| 2010 | Haven | Tracy Garrick | Episode: "Resurfacing" |
| 2010, 2017 | Murdoch Mysteries | Mildred Ash / Miriam Winters | 2 episodes |
| 2011 | King | Laura Lowell | Episode: "Cameron Bell" |
| 2013 | Cracked | Jane | Episode: "Night Terrors" |
| 2013 | Reign | Judith | Episode: "Hearts and Minds" |
| 2017 | Saving Hope | Jennifer Champagne | Episode: "Fix You" |
| 2017 | Black Mirror | Anaesthetist | Episode: "Arkangel" |
| 2017–2019 | The Handmaid's Tale | Leah | 9 episodes |
