= Beyond the Walls (2008 film) =

2008 Canadian short film

- French: La Battue
- Directed by: Guy Édoin
- Written by: Guy Édoin
- Produced by: Sylvain Corbeil; Pascal Bascaron
- Starring: Amélie Prévost; Denise Dubois; Ghyslaine Brodeur-Édoin; Marie Pelletier; Marie-Josée Forget
- Cinematography: Serge Desrosiers
- Edited by: Mathieu Denis
- Music by: Pierre Desrochers
- Production company: Metafilms
- Distributed by: Locomotion Distributions
- Release date: 2008
- Running time: 20 minutes
- Country: Canada
- Language: French

Beyond the Walls (French: La Battue) is a Canadian short drama film, directed by Guy Édoin and released in 2008. The third and final film in his "Les Affluents" trilogy of short films on rural themes, following The Bridge (Le pont) in 2004 and The Dead Water (Les eaux mortes) in 2006, the film centres on a young woman's troubled relationship with her mother, who regularly forces her to go hunting against her will.

The film's cast includes Amélie Prévost, Denise Dubois, Ghyslaine Brodeur-Édoin, Marie Pelletier and Marie-Josée Forget.

The film was named to the Toronto International Film Festival's annual year-end Canada's Top Ten list for 2008. It was a Genie Award nominee for Best Live Action Short Drama at the 29th Genie Awards, and a Prix Jutra nominee for Best Short Film at the 11th Jutra Awards.

All three films in the trilogy were subsequently released as bonus features on the DVD release of Édoin's feature film debut Wetlands (Marécages) in 2012.
