= Robert Todd (filmmaker) =

Robert Todd (September 24, 1963– August 18, 2018) was an American filmmaker, known primarily for his short poetic experimental films. He was a Professor in the Film Department at Emerson College.

His films have screened at The Rotterdam International Film Festival, The New York Film Festival, The Ann Arbor Film Festival, Media City Festival, and others.

== Films ==
Todd worked in a variety of genres including drama, traditional documentary, creative nonfiction and used techniques such as lyrical abstraction, and structural experimentation.

Since 1999 he worked nearly exclusively in 16mm. In addition to his short films, he produced long format documentaries which included In Loving Memory: In Loving Memory: Testimonials of Death Row Inmates Regarding Life (2005), and Master Plan(2011). In 2013 he created works for performance with musicians.

Two of Todd's films, Fantasies and Matters of Life and Death, were preserved by the Academy Film Archive in 2019.

== Awards ==
Todd received grants and awards from the LEF Foundation, The Brother Thomas Award from The Boston Foundation, and the Massachusetts Cultural Council.

== Death ==
Todd's death was reported on August 18, 2018.
