= RR (film) =

RR film
- Opening title
- Directed by: James Benning
- Produced by: James Benning
- Cinematography: James Benning
- Edited by: James Benning
- Release date: November 2, 2007
- Running time: 111 min
- Countries: United States; Germany
- Language: English

RR (a.k.a. Railroad) is a 2007 American experimental documentary feature by James Benning.

== Production ==
Shot on 16 mm film, as most of Benning's films are, RR is another in Benning's series of American experimental landscape films; this one focusing on trains and their surroundings. In Railroad, Benning explores themes of American consumerism and overconsumption in what Benning calls a "collaboration" with the trains themselves.

== Summary ==
The film is an exercise in minimalist restraint for it is basically a series of static shots of trains. There is an empty frame, the train enters, then it passes and leaves. The obsessive gaze of Benning's fixed static frame causes the viewer to wait and watch, obsessing, like train fanatic Benning does, on the imagery of the locomotive and the exploration of the random colors of its cars, the machinery and the various American landscapes the trains are surrounded by.
