= After the Ballot =

- Directed by: Manuel Foglia
- Release date: 2008
- Country: Canada

After the Ballot (Original French title: Chers électeurs) is a documentary film by Manuel Foglia, produced by the National Film Board of Canada. The film was released in 2008. It follows the lives of two members of the National Assembly of Québec - Charlotte L'Écuyer, a Liberal back bencher, and Daniel Turp, a Parti Québécois (PQ) Shadow Minister. The film follows L'Écuyer and her troubles with her own government. She wants to preserve her riding's lumbering jobs, although her government, insofar as it is presented in the film, is committed to preserving forests. Turp, on the hand, does not seem to have the same constituency problems. Here, the film focuses on his reaction to various political actions undertaken by the PQ, and his considering running for PQ leadership.

Of these two MNAs only Charlotte L'Écuyer has held on to her seat in subsequent elections. Daniel Turp lost his seat to Québec solidaire member Amir Khadir.

The filming took place during the Liberal Party's first majority government (2003–2007), under Premier Jean Charest.

During the filming, Bernard Landry faced a leadership challenged, launched, in part, by Pauline Marois. Landry lost support of his party, and stepped down as leader. Marois would not win the following leadership election, the prize instead going to André Boisclair. Although, following a terrible showing in the 2007 provincial election, Boisclair gave up leadership of his party. Marois would then become leader of the PQ, and is still today.

Thomas Mulcair, former Leader of the Official Opposition in Canadian federal politics, also features in the film as Minister of Sustainable Development in Jean Charest's Liberal government.
