= The Baby Formula =

- Directed by: Alison Reid
- Written by: Richard Beattie
- Produced by: Stephen Adams; James Mou; Alison Reid
- Starring: Angela Vint; Megan Fahlenbock
- Cinematography: Brian Harper
- Edited by: Mark Arcieri
- Music by: Robert Carli; Tim Thorney
- Production company: Free Spirit Films
- Release date: August 25, 2008 (FFM)
- Country: Canada
- Language: English

The Baby Formula is a 2008 Canadian mockumentary film, directed by Alison Reid. The film stars Angela Vint and Megan Fahlenbock as Athena and Lilith, a lesbian couple each pregnant with the other's baby through an experimental stem cell procedure that created artificial sperm from their DNA.

The film's cast also includes Rosemary Dunsmore, Dmitry Chepovetsky, Matt Baram and Maggie Cassella.

Both Vint and Fahlenbock were actually pregnant in real life during the production of the film. Vint gave birth during filming, necessitating some adjustments to the production schedule.

The film premiered in August 2008 at the Montreal World Film Festival. It was screened at the Inside Out Film and Video Festival in Toronto in 2009, where it won the Audience Award for Best Feature Film.

== See also ==
- List of LGBT films directed by women
