= It's Not Me, I Swear! =

- Theatrical release poster
- French: C'est pas moi, je le jure!
- Directed by: Philippe Falardeau
- Written by: Philippe Falardeau
- Produced by: Luc Déry, Kim McCraw
- Starring: Antoine L'Écuyer; Suzanne Clément; Daniel Brière; Catherine Faucher; Gabriel Maillé
- Cinematography: André Turpin
- Music by: Patrick Watson
- Distributed by: Christal Films
- Release date: September 26, 2008
- Running time: 105 minutes
- Country: Canada
- Language: French

It's Not Me, I Swear! (French: C'est pas moi, je le jure!) is a Canadian Quebec French-language comedy movie released in Quebec on September 26, 2008. It is directed by Philippe Falardeau and is adapted from Bruno Hébert's novels C'est pas moi, je le jure! and Alice court avec René. The film's soundtrack contains original songs composed by Montreal musician Patrick Watson. It was screened at the Toronto International Film Festival, the Berlin International Film Festival, and the Kingston Canadian Film Festival.

== Synopsis ==
The story begins with a boy hanging himself in a tree, for fun. Léon is a 10-year-old kid, with a tendency to vandalize, lie, prank, steal or even attempt suicide. He is not necessarily suicidal, but to escape punishments for his other deeds, he uses the suicide trick to get out of blame. When his parents were fighting, he sets fire to the bed, simply to make them stop. The story circulates around the evolving love of Léon, and another girl who lives next door, whose name is Lea. She is regularly beaten by her uncle, and dreams of a normal childhood, specifically showing a desire for Barbie dolls. Their love proves to be difficult however, as at first Leon cannot admit that he likes her, but when he confesses his love, Lea throws him off by replying that she too loves herself.

Léon's mother moves away when she and her husband have had a big argument, and leaves the next day for Greece. Léon and his brother struggle to accept this, and try several different ways to get in touch with her, such as running away to Greece, ringing her, or trying to find her home address. Leon follows Lea's plan to go to Greece but really Lea wants to look for her father. Lea runs off to look for her father but her father moved over a year ago, according to the woman living in the house where he once lived. Leon and Lea return but Leon's father is furious and Leon jumps off a high ledge to attempt suicide but fails.

One day, a woman who resembles Léons mother arrives from Greece, and delivers both messages and gifts from her. She is most probably a daughter. She also secretly gives Léon's brother the telephone number for her mother, and he telephones her many times in the dead of night; leaving expensive bills for Léon (the chronic liar) to take blame for. The story ends with Léon going to a local bowling alley where he often goes to spend time, but this time he places his head where the bowling ball hits the pins, and awaits the impact of the ball. Though he wakes up, and realizes that life may not be for him, but he is made for life.

== Cast ==
- Antoine L'Écuyer as Léon Doré
- Suzanne Clément as Madeleine Doré
- Daniel Brière as Philippe Doré
- Gabriel Maillé as Jérôme Doré
- Catherine Faucher as Léa
- Jules Philip as Mr. Marinier
- Micheline Bernard as Mrs. Brisebois
- Denis Gravereaux as Mr. Pouchonnaud
- Jean Maheux as Bishop Charlebois
- Évelyne Rompré as Mrs. Chavagnac
