= Real Time (film) =

- Theatrical release poster
- Directed by: Randall Cole
- Written by: Randall Cole
- Produced by: Paula Devonshire; Ari Lantos; Robert Lantos; Tyler Levine; Brian Mosoff; Julia Rosenberg; Pete Soltesz
- Starring: Randy Quaid; Jay Baruchel
- Cinematography: Rudolf Blahacek
- Edited by: Michael Pacek; Gareth C. Scales
- Music by: Jim Guthrie
- Production companies: APB Pictures; Devonshire Productions; January Films; Serendipity Point Films
- Distributed by: Maximum Film Distribution (Canada); Image Entertainment (United States)
- Release date: January 18, 2008
- Running time: 75 minutes
- Country: Canada
- Language: English

Real Time is a 2008 comedy-drama film directed by Randall Cole, which premiered on 18 January 2008 at the Slamdance Film Festival. True to its title, the film's story unfolds in real time.

== Plot ==
In Hamilton, Ontario, compulsive gambler Andy (Jay Baruchel) owes money to the wrong people; he blames his misfortune on "bad luck" and being "cursed". After failing to catch a cab to get to a horse racetrack, Andy is approached by a car driven by Reuban (Randy Quaid), an Australian contract killer; he orders Andy to enter the vehicle. Andy reluctantly complies and notices that the car's back seat holds a crate, inside which is Andy's cat, Cleo. When Andy attempts to leave with Cleo, Reuban locks the car doors. Andy protests, but Reuban repeatedly beats him over the head with his handgun until Andy stops talking. Reuban informs Andy that he owes his debtees C$68,000, and they are angry that Andy has been bragging about not paying up; they want him dead. Reuban gives Andy one hour to "make peace".

After insisting that he be allowed to exit the vehicle to urinate, Andy attempts to escape, but slips on a patch of ice and is wrangled back into the car by Reuban. Andy then asks Reuban to take them to the corner of a prostitute (Lucy Filippone) whom he claims looks like Rosie Perez. Upon arriving, the two find that she looks nothing like Andy remembered, so they instead go to visit Andy's grandmother (Jayne Eastwood). On the way, they stop at Jollop's Chicken, a fast food restaurant that Andy worked at in high school. While ordering food for his grandma, Andy banters with the English language-challenged cashier (Ella Chan) and berates his former boss, the store manager (Jeff Pustil).

Upon arriving at his grandma's house, Andy breaks down and apologizes to his bewildered, but compassionate grandma for breaking her heart with bad behavior. Andy uses the pretense of visiting with one of her cats to retreat upstairs, where he jumps out of a window in another escape attempt. Injuring his leg in the fall, Andy limps away from the house. Reuban catches up with Andy and shoots him in the leg. They return to the car as Andy's grandma watches from her front window.

On the road again, Reuban gives Andy an unmarked pill for his pain. Minutes remain until the deadline, so Reuban takes Andy to a lightly-forested clearing overlooking Hamilton. Andy begs for his life; Reuban is unmoved. After forcing Andy to turn away and drop to his knees, Reuban aims his gun at the back of Andy's head. Reuban tells Andy that his bad luck isn't luck at all, but the result of being stupid. He goes on to define bad luck as learning that a perceived ulcer is actually a tumor, then pulls the trigger.

Andy opens his eyes to find that Reuban has committed suicide. Examining the body, Andy finds an envelope marked with his name. He retreats to the driver's seat of Reuban's car and opens the envelope. Inside is a cheque also in his name for $68,000, on the back of which is written "You're a lucky son of a bitch, Andy!". Andy stares into the distance.

== Cast ==
- Jay Baruchel as Andy Hayes
- Randy Quaid as Reuban
- Jayne Eastwood as Grandma
- Lucy Filippone as Prostitute
- Jeff Pustil as Donny
- Ellan Chan as Kwan
- Jeff Teravainen as Radio DJ

== Soundtrack listing ==
- "Since Birth" - Triznian
- "One of Us Is Dead" - The Earlies
- "The Cigarette" - Jake Wilkinson
- "What Time Is It" - The Jive Five
- "Goodbye Farewell" - Abraham's Children
- "One Fine Morning" - Lighthouse
- "Sweet City Woman" - The Stampeders
- "Fly at Night" - Chilliwack (band)
- "Two for the Show" - Trooper
- "Gymnopédies #1" - Composed by Erik Satie and performed by Mary Kenodi
- "Without You" - Harry Nilsson
- "Scared" - The Tragically Hip

== Festivals ==
- Slamdance Film Festival
- Shanghai International Film Festival
- Toronto International Film Festival
- Atlantic Film Festival
- Mill Valley Film Festival
- Turin Film Festival
- Kingston Canadian Film Festival
- Mississauga Independent Film Festival

== Accolades ==
Award	Category	Recipient(s)	Result	Ref(s)
29th Genie Awards	Best Original Screenplay	Randall Cole	Nominated	
Vancouver Film Critics Circle Awards 2008	Best Supporting Actress in a Canadian Film	Jayne Eastwood	Nominated	
Vancouver Film Critics Circle Awards 2008	Best Supporting Actor in a Canadian Film	Randy Quaid	Won	

== Involvement in Quaid Conspiracy ==
Randy Quaid, flanked by wife Evi, formally accepted his Vancouver Film Critics Circle Award on February 23, 2011, over two years after the win was announced in January 2009. Of receiving the award, Quaid was quoted as saying "Having worked in Canada continuously over the years from The Apprenticeship of Duddy Kravitz to Brokeback Mountain to Real Time, it was a natural choice for us to come here for some R&R and to finally accept an award I had been given for Real Time."

The Quaids had been living in Canada since October 2010, presumably having fled the U.S. to avoid various recent legal issues. In their defense, the Quaids claimed that they were being targeted by the "Hollywood Star Whackers", a group of assassins that supposedly killed celebrities such as David Carradine and Heath Ledger.
