= My Name Is Victor Gazon =

2008 Canadian short film

- French: Mon nom est Victor Gazon
- Directed by: Patrick Gazé
- Written by: Patrick Gazé
- Produced by: Antonello Cozzolino; Marie-Josée Larocque; Annie Normandin
- Starring: Claudel Poirier; Jassen Charron
- Cinematography: Nicolas Bolduc
- Edited by: Patrick Gazé
- Production company: Facteur 7
- Distributed by: Disk4t Distribution
- Release date: 2008
- Running time: 11 minutes
- Country: Canada
- Language: French

My Name Is Victor Gazon (French: Mon nom est Victor Gazon) is a Canadian short comedy-drama film, directed by Patrick Gazé and released in 2008. The film stars Claudel Poirier as the titular Victor Gazon, a young boy enumerating the pros and cons of living for a suicide prevention project at school, soon after his own uncle has committed suicide.

The film was named to the Toronto International Film Festival's annual year-end Canada's Top Ten list for 2008. It was a Genie Award nominee for Best Live Action Short Drama at the 29th Genie Awards, and a Prix Jutra nominee for Best Short Film at the 11th Jutra Awards.
