= Randall Cole =

Canadian film director and screenwriter

- Education: Canadian Film Centre
- Occupations: Film director; screenwriter

Randall Cole is a Canadian film director and screenwriter. He is most noted for his 2008 film Real Time, for which he was a Genie Award nominee for Best Original Screenplay at the 29th Genie Awards in 2009.

Originally from London, Ontario, he is a graduate of the Canadian Film Centre. He also wrote and directed the feature films 19 Months (2002) and 388 Arletta Avenue (2011), and was a writer for the horror television series Darknet.
