= Princess Margaret Blvd. =

- Directed by: Kazik Radwanski
- Written by: Kazik Radwanski
- Produced by: Daniel Montgomery
- Starring: Gina Sylvester; Tim Braddock
- Cinematography: Daniel Voshart
- Edited by: Ajla Odobasic
- Production company: Medium Density Fiberboard Films
- Release date: September 4, 2008 (TIFF)
- Running time: 14 minutes
- Country: Canada
- Language: English

Princess Margaret Blvd. is a 2008 Canadian drama short film, directed by Kazik Radwanski. Made as a class project by Radwanski and producer Daniel Montgomery for their final year of film studies at Ryerson University, the film stars Gina Sylvester as Isabelle Rodarte, a woman coming to terms with her diagnosis with Alzheimer's disease.

The film was named to the Toronto International Film Festival's year-end Canada's Top Ten list for 2008, and received a Genie Award nomination for Best Live Action Short Drama at the 30th Genie Awards.
