= Guy Édoin =

Canadian film director and screenwriter

Guy Édoin is a Canadian film director and screenwriter, whose debut full-length film Wetlands (Marécages) was released in 2011.

Originally from Saint-Armand, Quebec, Édoin studied at the Université du Québec à Montréal and the Université de Montréal.

Prior to Wetlands he wrote and directed the "Les Affluents" short film trilogy of The Bridge (Le Pont) in 2004, The Dead Water (Les Eaux mortes) in 2006 and Beyond the Walls (La Battue) in 2008. All three films received Prix Jutra nominations for Best Short Film, with The Dead Water winning at the 9th Jutra Awards, and Beyond the Walls received a Genie Award nomination for Best Live Action Short Drama at the 29th Genie Awards.

His second feature film, Ville-Marie, was released in 2015.

Édoin, who is gay, frequently addresses LGBT themes in his work.

He began shooting the film Frontiers (Frontières) in fall 2021.

== Filmography ==
- The Bridge (Le Pont) - 2004
- The Dead Water (Les Eaux mortes) - 2006
- Beyond the Walls (La Battue) - 2008
- Wetlands (Marécages) - 2011
- Corno - 2013
- Ville-Marie - 2015
- Malek - 2019
- Frontiers (Frontières) - 2023
