= Ghosts and Gravel Roads =

2008 Canadian short film

- Directed by: Mike Rollo
- Cinematography: Terryll Loffler
- Edited by: Mike Rollo
- Distributed by: Canadian Filmmakers Distribution Centre
- Release date: March 30, 2008
- Running time: 16 minutes
- Country: Canada

Ghosts and Gravel Roads is a Canadian short documentary film, directed by Mike Rollo and released in 2008. The film depicts various abandoned farm buildings in rural Saskatchewan, with a hand pinning up archival photographs suggestive of the people who might once have lived or worked there.

Rollo is a film production professor at the University of Regina, and makes experimental documentary films exploring "alternative approaches to documentary cinema – methods which thematize vanishing cultures and transitional spaces."

The film was named to the Toronto International Film Festival's annual year-end Canada's Top Ten list for 2008, and was the winner of the Silver Mikeldi at the 2008 Zinebi - Bilbao International Documentary and Short Film Festival.
