= Kazik Radwanski =

Canadian filmmaker (born 1985)

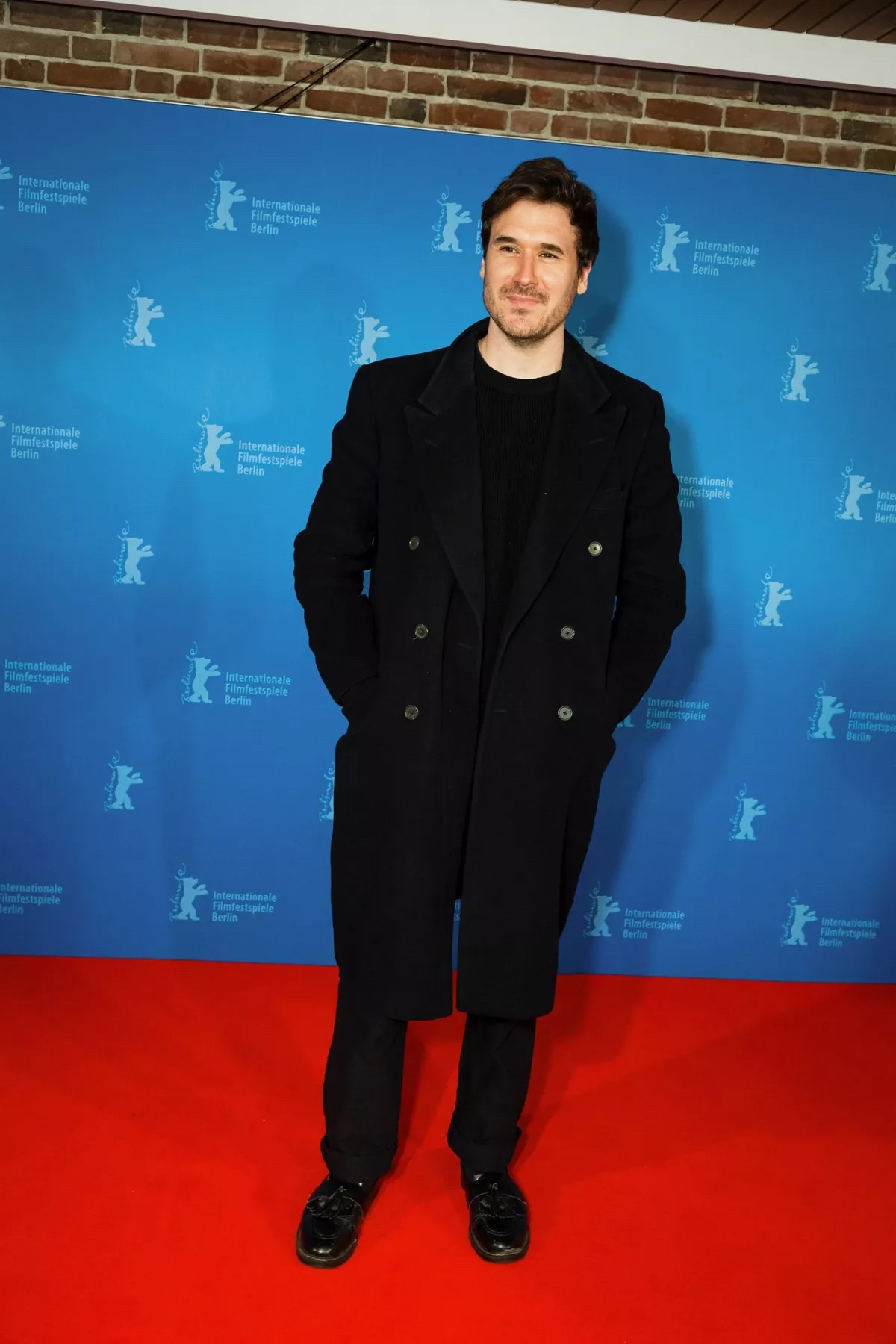
- Radwanski at the 74th Berlin International Film Festival
- Born: 1985 (age 40–41); Canada
- Occupations: Director, writer, producer
- Years active: 2007–present

Kazik Radwanski is a Canadian film director and screenwriter. His early short films have been cited as part of the New Canadian Cinema movement. He made his feature film directorial debut in 2012 with Tower. His second feature film, How Heavy This Hammer (2015), screened at film festivals around the world and received critical acclaim.

Radwanski's third feature film, Anne at 13,000 Ft. (2019), starring Deragh Campbell, won the Toronto Film Critics Association's $100,000 Rogers Best Canadian Film Award in 2021. His fourth feature, Matt and Mara, was released in 2024.

In 2009, Radwanski founded Medium Density Fibreboard Films (MDFF) with his producing partner Dan Montgomery. The company produces and distributes Canadian films, and also runs a monthly "MDFF Selects" screening series of independent international cinema, currently at TIFF Lightbox. The Globe and Mail called MDFF "one of the most influential forces in independent Canadian cinema."

== Career ==
=== 2000s ===
Before transitioning into feature films with his directorial debut Tower (2012), Radwanski wrote and directed several award-winning short films, including Assault (2007), Princess Margaret Blvd. (2008), Out in That Deep Blue Sea (2009), and Green Crayons (2010), all of which screened at film festivals around the world, most notably in Edinburgh, Melbourne, and Berlin.

=== 2010s ===
Radwanski's first feature film, Tower, had its world premiere at the 2012 Locarno Film Festival, followed by its North American premiere at the 2012 Toronto International Film Festival. It had a long festival run screening at many festivals, including the Viennale, the New Directors/New Films Festival hosted by Film Society of Lincoln Center, and the Museum of Modern Art.

Tower was met with critical acclaim upon its release. The Wall Street Journal proclaimed it as "thoroughly compelling, juxtaposing idiosyncratic camerawork with raw insight into the sort of person everyone knows" Eric Kohn of IndieWire described the protagonist as "an awkward loner made mesmerizing", and Scott Foundas for the Village Voice described it as "a Sisyphus for the Asperger’s era". Now named Tower one of the "Top 25 Toronto Films" of all time.

Following the release of Tower, Radwanski released the short film Cutaway in 2014. Told entirely without spoken dialogue, the film depicts a day in a man's life entirely through a close focus on his hands, including his performance of physical labour and text conversations with his girlfriend. The film was named to the Toronto International Film Festival's year-end Canada's Top Ten list for 2014.

Radwanski's second film, How Heavy This Hammer, made its world premiere at the 2015 Toronto International Film Festival, followed by its international premiere at the 66th Berlin International Film Festival. It subsequently screened on the festival circuit for over two years.

During its festival run it received generally favourable reviews from critics. Adam Cook in a dispatch to Brooklyn Magazine wrote "Radwanski’s sensitive and empathetic approach effectively brings the viewer into this mundanity and helping us understand the silent pressures and tensions of this unremarkable man and his existential woes". Angelo Muredda for Cinema Scope said "In just two features and several shorts, co-conceived with producing partner Dan Montgomery, Radwanski has proven himself a gentler, Southern Ontarian answer to Dardennes-style social realism, finding dignity and pathos in the repetitive rhythms and small pleasures of working-class lives". Mubi Notebook editor Daniel Kasman observed "Such a small story, such an average person to spend time with—this is something no television show would attempt, no mid-tier festival film dare gamble their eligibility for an audience award on. Yet here it is: quiet, a bit pensive, a bit mysterious, and never less than thoughtful. The kind of film you love to discover at a festival". However, The Hollywood Reporter deemed it "an aggressively dreary look at a man who shouldn't have had a family".

During its theatrical run in Canada, the film was met with critical acclaim; it was ultimately nominated for Best Canadian Film at the Toronto Film Critics Association Awards 2016, though it did not win. The National Post named it "a must-see this week when it opens theatrically in Vancouver and Toronto", The Toronto Star praised its "unique combination of empathy and scorn", NOW Magazine said "Radwanski packs a lot of angst into his slim running time", Exclaim! stated it was "one of the very best Canadian films of the year", and The Globe and Mail called it "raw and engrossing".

When the film had a theatrical run in New York in 2016, it was met with mixed reviews: The New York Times wrote that "whatever investigation it’s attempting, the movie is leaden in its pacing — the first 15 minutes feel like an hour — and its constricted shooting style, practically all hand-held almost close-ups, is transparent in its contrivance of realism". Meanwhile, The Village Voice proclaimed that it was, "Striking, clear-eyed, and very, very funny, it's been justly celebrated as one of the best Canadian films in years".

Radwanski's most recent short film, Scaffold, premiered at the 70th Locarno Film Festival, had its North American premiere in the Wavelengths section of the 2017 Toronto International Film Festival, and its US premiere at the 55th New York Film Festival. The film was nominated for an award at the London Film Festival.

=== 2020s ===
His next feature film, Anne at 13,000 Ft., premiered at the 2019 Toronto International Film Festival, and received an honourable mention from the Platform Prize jury. It was nominated for four Canadian Screen Awards in 2020, including Best Motion Picture. In December 2019, the film was named to TIFF's annual year-end Canada's Top Ten list.

The film screened at the 70th Berlin International Film Festival in 2020. In 2021, the film won the Toronto Film Critics Association's $100,000 Rogers Best Canadian Film Award. It was also nominated for four Canadian Screen Awards, including Best Motion Picture, and five Vancouver Film Critics Circle Awards.

His fourth feature film, Matt and Mara, was filmed in the summer of 2022 and premiered at the 74th Berlin International Film Festival.

== Filmography ==
Year	Film	Type	Director	Writer	Producer	Notes
2007	Assault	Short film	Yes	Yes	Yes	
2008	Princess Margaret Blvd.	Short film	Yes	Yes	Yes	
2009	Out in That Deep Blue Sea	Short film	Yes	Yes	Yes	
2010	Green Crayons	Short film	Yes	Yes	Yes	
2012	Tower	Feature film	Yes	Yes	Yes	Feature directorial debut
2014	Cutaway	Short film	Yes	Yes	Yes	
2015	How Heavy This Hammer	Feature film	Yes	Yes	Yes	
2017	Scaffold	Short film	Yes	Yes	Yes	
2019	Anne at 13,000 Ft.	Feature film	Yes	Yes	Yes	
2024	Matt and Mara	Feature film	Yes	Yes	Yes	
