= Next Floor =

2008 film by Denis Villeneuve

- Film poster
- Directed by: Denis Villeneuve
- Screenplay by: Jacques Davidts
- Story by: Caroline Binet; Phoebe Greenberg
- Produced by: Phoebe Greenberg; Karen Murphy
- Starring: Jean Marchand; Matthieu Handfield; Sébastian René; Emmanuel Schwartz
- Cinematography: Nicolas Bolduc
- Edited by: Sophie Leblond
- Music by: Warren Slim Williams
- Release date: May 15, 2008 (Cannes)
- Running time: 11 minutes
- Country: Canada
- Language: English

Next Floor is a 2008 Canadian absurdist dark comedy short film directed by Denis Villeneuve. The film, largely wordless, depicts a group of eleven people endlessly gorging themselves on raw meats at a banquet.

== Synopsis ==
During an opulent and luxurious banquet, attended by servers and valets, eleven pampered guests participate in what appears to be ritualistic gastronomic carnage.

== Characters and cast ==
- Maître D • Jean Marchand
- Servers • Mathieu Handfield, Sébastien René, Emmanuel Schwartz
- Diners • Simone Chevalot, Ken Fernandez, Ariel Ifergan, Sergiy Marchenko, Deepak Massand, Gaétan Nadeau, Charles Papasoff, Daniel Rousse, Helga Schmitz, Dennis St-John, Valérie Wiseman

== Production background ==
The film was conceived by producer Phoebe Greenberg and directed by Denis Villeneuve during a break from production of his feature film Polytechnique.

== Release and reception ==
The film premiered at the 2008 Cannes Film Festival, as part of the Semaine de la critique program.

=== Critical response ===
For Indiewire, journalist Zach Hollwedel theorized that the banquet attendees were in hell, and being forced to atone for their gluttonous lifestyles when they were alive, or that the film was a metaphorical comment on the voracious and destructive nature of human consumerism.

=== Accolades ===
At Cannes, the film received the Canal+ prize for the best short film in its program.

The film received a special jury citation for the Toronto International Film Festival Award for Best Canadian Short Film at the 2008 Toronto International Film Festival, and won the Genie Award for Best Live Action Short Drama at the 29th Genie Awards and the Prix Jutra for Best Short Film at the 11th Jutra Awards.
