= Patrick Gazé =

Canadian film director and screenwriter

Patrick Gazé is a Canadian film director and screenwriter from Quebec. He is most noted for his 2008 short film My Name Is Victor Gazon (Mon nom est Victor Gazon), which was a Genie Award nominee for Best Live Action Short Drama at the 29th Genie Awards, and a Prix Jutra nominee for Best Short Film at the 11th Jutra Awards.

Stranger in a Cab (Ceci n'est pas un polar), his debut feature film, was released in 2014.
