= Marie-Josée Saint-Pierre =

Canadian animated film directors

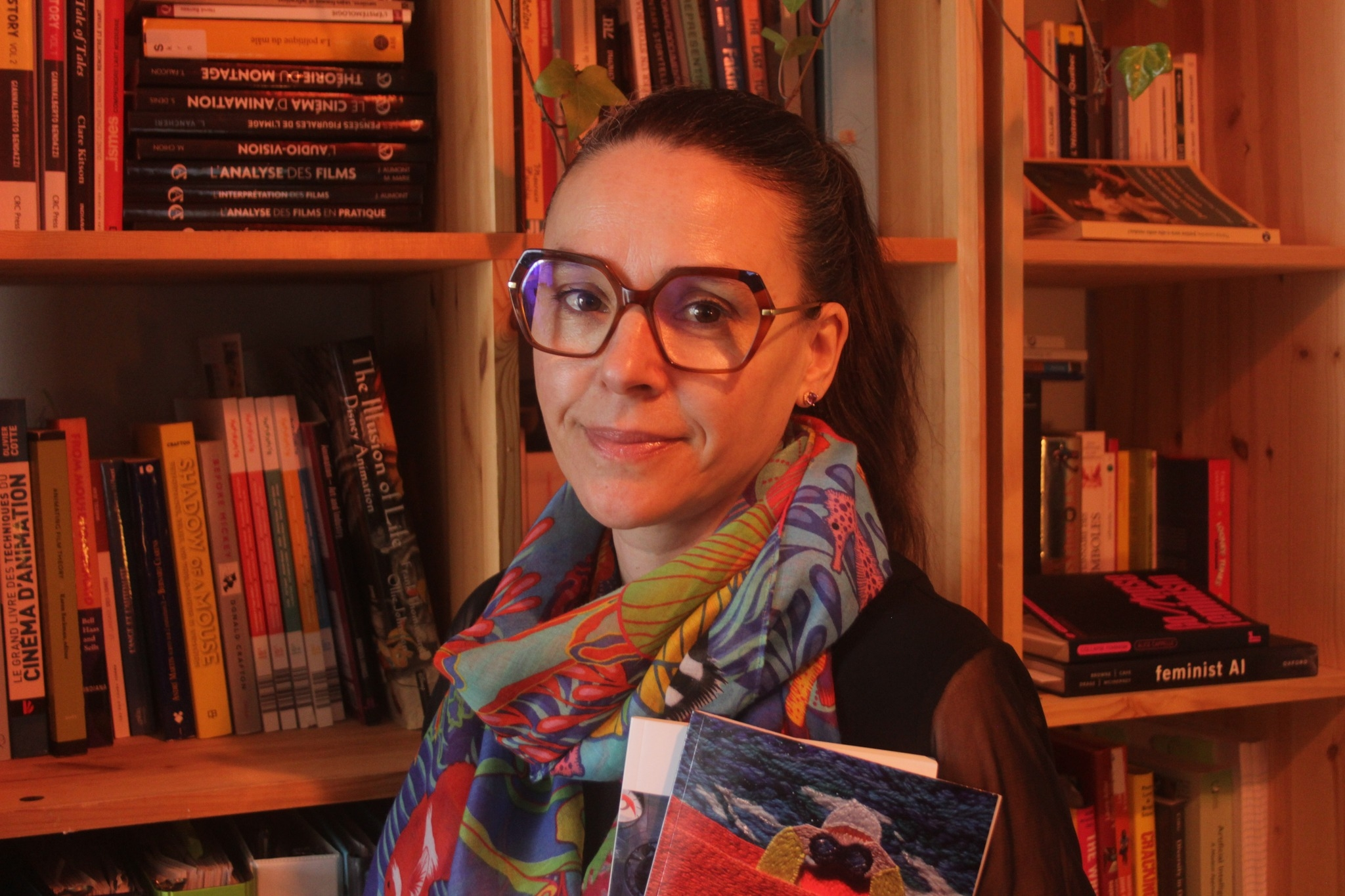
- Born: 1978 (age 47–48); Murdochville, Quebec, Canada
- Education: Concordia University, Université du Québec à Montréal
- Occupations: Film director, film producer

Marie-Josée Saint-Pierre, born in Murdochville in 1978, is a Quebec director and producer of animated films. She is an associate professor at Université Laval, a theorist, and an author on women's animation cinema.

== Cinematographic Career ==
In 2004, she founded the independent production company MJSTP Films, dedicated to the creation and production of her own films. She specializes in animated documentaries. She notably uses the technique of rotoscoping and also incorporates archival footage into her creations.

Two themes stand out in her cinematic work: motherhood, which she explored in Post-Partum, Passages, Femelles, and Your Mother is a Thief!; and artistic creation, with McLaren's Negatives, The Sapporo Project, Jutra, Snowflakes, Oscar, and The Lauzon Theory.

As a producer, she is also credited with The Blue Marble by Co Hoedeman and The Delian Mode by Kara Blake. Her films have been showcased worldwide in competitive events, including the Directors' Fortnight at Cannes and the Toronto International Film Festival.

She also served as artistic director and animator on Patricio Henríquez's feature documentary Uyghurs: Prisoners of the Absurd.

== Academic career ==
Marie-Josée Saint-Pierre studied in Montreal at Concordia University, where she earned a bachelor's degree in animation cinema and a master's degree in film production.

She then obtained a doctorate in art studies and practices from the Université du Québec à Montréal, with a doctoral concentration in feminist studies from the Institute of Feminist Research and Studies (IRéF). Her graduate studies were funded by the Vanier CGS Scholarship. She is an associate professor at Université Laval, her academic research focuses on women and animation cinema, animated documentaries and research-creation using artificial intelligence tools in animation.

== Filmography ==
=== Screenwriter, director and producer ===
- 2004: Post-Partum
- 2006: McLaren's Negatives
- 2008: Passages
- 2010: The Sapporo Project
- 2012: Female
- 2014: Flocons
- 2014: Jutra
- 2016: Oscar
- 2018: Your Mother is a Thief!

=== Screenwriter and director ===
- 2022: Lauzon's Theory

=== Producer ===
- 2009: The Delian Mode by Kara Blake
- 2014: The Blue Marble by Co Hoedeman

== Publications ==
Marie-Josée Saint-Pierre is also an author on women and animated cinema: she has published books and scientific articles on the subject.

=== Books ===
- Saint-Pierre, Marie-Josée (2024). Women and Film Animation: A Feminist Corpus at the National Film Board of Canada 1939-1989. CRC Press. ISBN 978-1-0326-8536-6.
- Saint-Pierre, Marie-Josée (2022). Femmes et cinéma d'animaiton: Un corpus féministe à l'Office national du film du Canada 1939-1989. Les Presses de l'Université de Montréal. ISBN 978-2-7606-4577-6.

=== Scientific publications ===
- Saint-Pierre, M.-J. et Lebel, E. (2023). Celebrating and Sharing a Heritage of Black People : Martine Chartrand, Animation Filmmaker. Recherches Féministes. vol. 35, no.1. doi:10.7202/1099910ar
- Saint-Pierre, M.-J. (2020). Quebec animation cinema and women's agentivity: an exploration of sexuality and desire through the works of three animators produced at the National Film Board of Canada. Animation Studies, The Peer-reviewed Open Access Online Journal for Animation History and Theory, Volume15. partie de ISSN 1930-1928
- Saint-Pierre, M.-J. (2019). Cinéma d’animation québécois et agentivité féminine: une exploration de la sexualité et du désir à travers trois oeuvres d’animatrices produites à l’Office national du film du Canada. Nouvelles Vues, Volume 20 (1-18). doi:10.7202/1069291ar

=== Book Chapter ===
- Saint-Pierre, M.-J. (2022). La Ménagère (The Housewife, Bennett, 1975) et la notion de sexage. Dans Julie Ravary-Pilon et Ersy Contogouris (Dir.). Pour des histoires audiovisuelles des femmes au Québec : diversité, divergence et confluence. Les Presses de l’Université de Montréal. part of ISBN 978-2-7606-4577-6

=== Other publications ===
- Saint-Pierre, M.-J. (2023) Compte-rendu: Johanne Jutras, Pornographies. Recherches Féministes. doi:10.7202/1108782ar
- Saint-Pierre, M.-J. (2023). Women and animated film: an introduction. International Animated Film Association Magazine. vol. 34, no.1. OCLC: 300299292
- Saint-Pierre, M.J. et Brun, J. (2023). Estelle Lebel (1945–2022), chercheuse, professeure, réalisatrice et militante féministe. Recherches Féministes. vol. 35, no.1. doi:10.7202/1099891ar
- Saint-Pierre, M.-J. (2021) Compte-rendu: Julie Ravary-Pilon, Femmes, nation et nature dans le cinéma québécois. Recherches Féministes, vol. 34, no.1. (248-253). doi:10.7202/1076634ar
- Saint-Pierre, M.-J. (2020). Francine Desbiens récompensée du prix René Jodoin aux 18e Sommets du Cinéma d’Animation de Montréal. Synoptique, An Online Journal of Film and Moving Images Studies, Volume 9.1 (162-167). partie de ISSN 1715-7641
- Saint-Pierre, M.-J. (22 mai 2014). I am caught up in the whirlwind of Cannes. HuffPost: the blog.
- Saint-Pierre, M.-J. (20 mai 2014). My first time at Cannes: the trip of my life! HuffPost: the blog.

== Completed Research Projects ==
As part of her academic research, she led the creation of two animation series, developed in collaboration with students under her supervision.

2021: Series of twenty-two documentary animated short films produced for the web documentary Les infirmières de la folie.

2024: Series of four experimental animated short films ( Passer au travers, Espoir, Montages russes et Impuissance) produced for the project Visuallys For a Visual Language of Mental Health: Exploring the Power of the Image to Change Social Representations.

== Awards ==
=== Lauzon's Theory (2022) ===
- Official selection Not Short on talent at Cannes 2022
- Nomination for the Quebec College Cinema Award (PCCQ), 2022 (Canada)
- Official selection Regard - Saguenay International Short Film Festival 2023 (Canada)

=== Your Mother is a Thief! (2018) ===
- Most innovative film Award, Reel 2 Real International Film Festival for Youth, 2019 (Canada)

=== Oscar (2016) ===
- Animation, Yorkton Film Festival, 2017 (Canada)
- Audience Choice Award for Program A, New York City Short Film Festival 2016 (USA)
- Nomination at the Rendez-vous du cinéma québécois (Canada)
- Nomination for best animated short film at the 2016 Quebec Cinema Gala (Canada)
- Official selection Regard - Saguenay International Short Film Festival 2017 (Canada)

=== Jutra (2014) ===
- Gémeaux Award, Best animated television show 2015 (Canada)
- Jutra Award, Best short animated film 2015 (Canada).
- Canadian Screen Awards, Best short documentary 2015 (Canada)
- Méliès "Light of Québec", Festival du Film Court de Mont-Tremblant 2014 (Canada)
- Mention best animated film from Canada, Sommets du cinéma d’animation 2014 (Canada)
- Official selection at the Cannes Directors' Fortnight 2014 (Canada)
- Official selection in international short film competition at the Montreal International Documentary Meetings 2014 (Canada)

=== Femelles (2012) ===
Best Short Documentary Film, St. Louis International Film Festival 2012 (USA)

=== Passages (2008) ===
- Best Documentary Film, Sapporo International Shortfest 2009 (Japan)
- Best Animation Film, Brooklyn International Film Festival 2009 (USA)
- Public Award for Best Foreign Short Film Public, Créteil's Woman Film Festival 2009 (France)
- Special Jury Award, Personal Expression and Advocacy, Austin Festival 2008 (USA)
- Honorable Mention, Best Canadian Short Film, Atlantic Film Festival 2008 (Canada)
- Special Mention, Golden Key Award, Kassel Dokumentarfilm und Videofest 2008 (Germany)
- Nomination for Best Short Documentary Film, Genie Award 2010 (Canada)
- Selection for the Canada's Top Ten, Best Short Films, by the Toronto International Film Festival, 2009 (Canada)

=== McLaren's Negatives (2006) ===
- Jutra Award for Best Animated Film 2007 (Québec)
- Honorable Mention best short film, Silverdocs 2006 (USA)
- Best Debut Film, Animation, Message to Man International Film Festival, St Petersbourg 2006 (Russia)
- Best Short Contemporary Film, Sapporo International Shortfest 2006 (Japan)
- Bear in Gold, Festival Der Nationen 2006 (Austria)
- Best Short Documentary Film, Animation Block Party New York 2006 (USA)
- Best Animation Film, Dokufest 2006 (Kosovo)
- Best International Documentary, Santiago International Short Film Festival 2006 (Chile)
- Best Director Animation, Monstramundo 2006 (Brazil)
- Best Script Animation, Monstramundo 2006 (Brazil)
- Youth Jury Award for Most Inspirational Short Film, Reel 2 Real International Film Festival for Youth 2007 (Canada)
- First Prize in the Documentary Section, 10 Mostra Internacional de Curtmetratges de Sagunt 2007 (Spain)
- Best Documentary, PA Film Institute Festival 2007 (USA)
- Platinum Remi, Best Animation, Worldfest Houston 2007 (USA)
- Special Jury Prize, Directing, Indianapolis Film Festival 2007 (USA)
- Best Documentary, Arizona International Film Festival 2007 (USA)
- Special Jury Award for Best Animated Film, Ismailia International Film Festival 2007 (Egypt)
- Best Documentary, Filmest Badalona Festival 2007 (Spain)
- Honorable Mention, Best Short International Film, Festival International de Curtas de Belo Horizonte 2006 (Brazil)
- Honorable Mention, International Animation Competition, Monterrey International Festival 2006 (Mexico)
- Special Mention Animation, Seddicorto International Festival 2006 (Italia)
- Special Mention Animation, Luciana Film Festival 2006 (Italia)

=== Post-Partum (2004) ===
- Special Jury Prize for Most Innovative Approach, Guangzhou International Documentary Festival 2005 (China)
- Gold Special Jury Award, Worldfest Houston 2005 (USA)
- GAIA Award, Moondance International Film Festival 2005 (USA)
- Shoestring Award, Rochester International Film Festival 2005 (USA)
- Artistic Development Award, Imperial Tobacco Canada Arts Council 2004
- J.A. De Sève Graduate Award 2004, Mel Hoppenheim School of Cinema (Canada)
