= Wetlands (2011 film) =

- Theatrical release poster
- French: Marécages
- Directed by: Guy Édoin
- Written by: Guy Édoin
- Produced by: Félize Frappier; Luc Vandal
- Starring: Pascale Bussières; Gabriel Maillé; Luc Picard; François Papineau
- Cinematography: Serge Desrosiers
- Edited by: Mathieu Bouchard-Malo
- Music by: Nathalie Boileau; Pierre Desrochers
- Distributed by: Métropole Films Distribution
- Release dates: September 11, 2011 (Toronto Film Festival); October 14, 2011 (Canada)
- Running time: 111 minutes
- Country: Canada
- Language: French

Wetlands (French: Marécages) is a 2011 Canadian film from Quebec written and directed by Guy Édoin and starring Pascale Bussières, Gabriel Maillé, Luc Picard and François Papineau. It had its Canadian premier at the Toronto International Film Festival and its Quebec premier at the Festival de Cinéma de la Ville de Québec (FCVQ). Theatrical release was on October 14, 2011.

== Plot ==
During a drought, conflict disrupts the life of the Santerre family on a dairy farm in Quebec's Eastern Townships. By confronting themselves, they learn to forgive.

== Cast ==
- Pascale Bussières as Marie
- Gabriel Maillé as Simon
- Luc Picard as Jean
- François Papineau as Pierre
- Angèle Coutu as Therese
- Denise Dubois as Rejeanne
- Julien Lemire as a young farmer
- Michel Perron as a well-digger (father)
- Guillaume Cyr as a well-digger (son)
- Valérie Blain as danser

== Awards and nominations ==
- 2011: Nominated for "Best First Film" at the Mostra Venice Film Festival
- 2011: Nominated for "KINO Audience Award – International Film Critics' Week" at the Mostra Venice Film Festival
- 2012: Nominated for the Prix collégial du cinéma québécois
