= 2010 Toronto International Film Festival =

Annual Canadian film festival

- Festival poster
- Opening film: Score: A Hockey Musical
- Closing film: Last Night
- Location: Toronto, Canada
- Awards: The King's Speech (People's Choice Award)
- Hosted by: Toronto International Film Festival Group
- No. of films: 258 features, 81 shorts
- Festival date: September 9, 2010–September 19, 2010
- Language: English
- Website: https://www.tiff.net/
- 2011 2009

The 35th annual Toronto International Film Festival, (TIFF) was held in Toronto, Ontario, Canada between September 9 and September 19, 2010. The opening night gala presented Score: A Hockey Musical, a Canadian comedy-drama musical film. Last Night closed the festival on September 19.

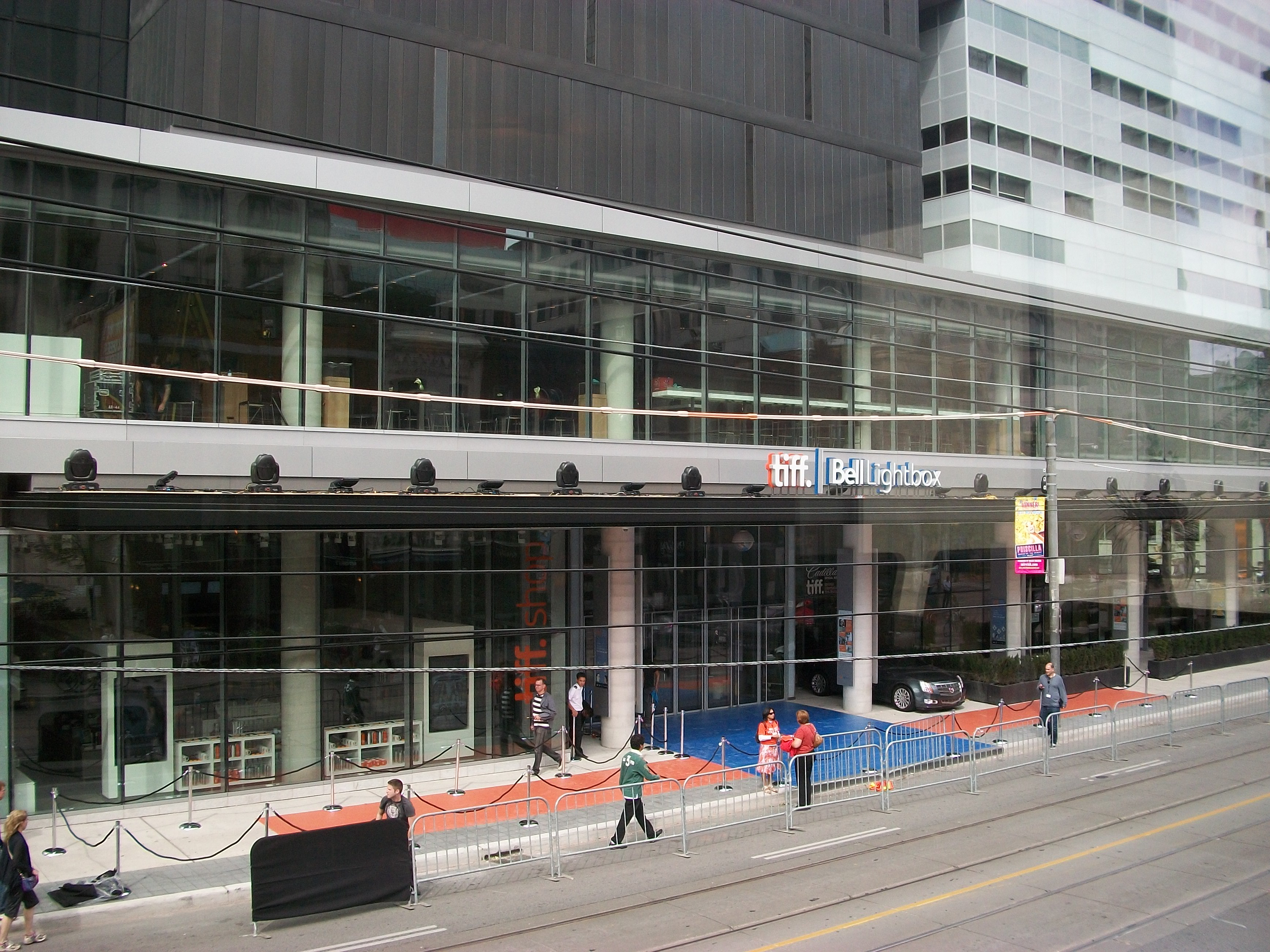
The TIFF Bell Lightbox had its formal opening on September 12, 2010, during the festival. This shot was taken the day before the opening.

2010 TIFF included 258 feature films, down from 264 in 2009. However, the number of short films at the 2010 festival increased to 81 (compared to 70 in 2009), making the total number of films 339, five more than in 2009.

Of the feature films, TIFF claims that 112 are world premieres, 24 are international premieres (i.e. the first screening outside the film's home country), and 98 are North American premieres. (In fact, some of the so-called premieres screened at the Telluride Film Festival before TIFF.)

== Awards ==
Award	Film	Director
People's Choice Award	The King's Speech	Tom Hooper
People's Choice Award Runner Up	The First Grader	Justin Chadwick
People's Choice Midnight Madness	Stake Land	Jim Mickle
People's Choice Midnight Madness Runner Up	Fubar 2	Michael Dowse
People's Choice Documentary	Force of Nature: The David Suzuki Movie	Sturla Gunnarsson
People's Choice Documentary Runner Up	Nostalgia for the Light	Patricio Guzmán
Best Canadian Short Film	Little Flowers (Les Fleurs de l'âge)	Vincent Biron
Best Canadian First Feature Film	High Cost of Living	Deborah Chow
City of Toronto Award for Best Canadian Feature Film	Incendies	Denis Villeneuve
FIPRESCI Prize for the Discovery	Beautiful Boy	Shawn Ku
FIPRESCI for Special Presentations	L'Amour fou	Pierre Thoretton

== Programme ==
=== Gala Presentations ===
English title	Original title	Director(s)	Production country
The Bang Bang Club		Steven Silver	Canada, South Africa
Barney's Version		Richard J. Lewis	Canada, Italy
A Beginner's Guide to Endings		Jonathan Sobol	Canada
Black Swan		Darren Aronofsky	United States
Casino Jack		George Hickenlooper	Canada
The Conspirator		Robert Redford	United States
The Debt		John Madden	United States
The Housemaid		Im Sang-soo	South Korea
Janie Jones		David M. Rosenthal	United States
The King's Speech		Tom Hooper	United Kingdom, Australia
Last Night		Massy Tadjedin	United States, France
Little White Lies	Les Petits Mouchoirs	Guillaume Canet	France
Peep World		Barry Blaustein	United States
Potiche		François Ozon	France
The Promise: The Making of Darkness on the Edge of Town		Thom Zimny	United States
Sarah's Key	Elle s'appelait Sarah	Gilles Paquet Brenner	France
Score: A Hockey Musical		Michael McGowan	Canada
The Town		Ben Affleck	United States
The Way		Emilio Estevez	United States
West is West		Andy De Emmony	United Kingdom

=== Special Presentations ===
English title	Original title	Director(s)	Production country
127 Hours		Danny Boyle	United States
AMIGO		John Sayles	United States
L'Amour fou		Pierre Thoretton	France
Another Year		Mike Leigh	United Kingdom
Beginners		Mike Mills	United States
The Big Picture	L'Homme qui voulait vivre sa vie	Éric Lartigau	France
Biutiful		Alejandro González Iñárritu	Mexico, Spain
Blue Valentine		Derek Cianfrance	United States
Bombay Diaries	Dhobi Ghat	Kiran Rao	India
Brighton Rock		Rowan Joffé	United Kingdom
Buried		Rodrigo Cortés	Spain
Conviction		Tony Goldwyn	United States
Cirkus Columbia		Danis Tanović	Bosnia and Herzegovina
Deep in the Woods	Promenons-nous dans les bois	Benoît Jacquot	France
Easy A		Will Gluck	United States
Everything Must Go		Dan Rush	United States
Force of Nature: The David Suzuki Movie		Sturla Gunnarsson	Canada
Good Neighbours		Jacob Tierney	Canada
Gorbaciof		Stefano Incerti	Italy
Heartbeats	Les Amours imaginaires	Xavier Dolan	Canada
Henry's Crime		Malcolm Venville	United States
Hereafter		Clint Eastwood	United States
The House by the Medlar Tree	Malavoglia	Pasquale Scimeca	Italy
I'm Still Here		Casey Affleck	United States
I Saw the Devil	악마를 보았다	Kim Jee-woon	South Korea
The Illusionist	L'Illusioniste	Sylvain Chomet	France, United Kingdom
In a Better World	Hævnen	Anders Thomas Jensen	Denmark
Incendies		Denis Villeneuve	Canada
It's Kind of a Funny Story		Anna Boden, Ryan Fleck	United States
Jack Goes Boating		Philip Seymour Hoffman	United States
Julia's Eyes	Los ojos de Julia	Guillem Morales	Spain
The Last Circus	Balada triste de trompeta	Álex de la Iglesia	Spain, France
Legend of the Fist: The Return of Chen Zhen		Andrew Lau	Hong Kong
Let Me In		Matt Reeves	United Kingdom, United States
Lope		Andrucha Waddington	Spain, Brazil
Love Crime	Crime d'amour	Alain Corneau	France
Made in Dagenham		Nigel Cole	United Kingdom
Miral		Julian Schnabel	France, India, Israel, Italy, Palestine, United States
Mothers	Majki	Milcho Manchevski	Macedonia, France, Bulgaria
Never Let Me Go		Mark Romanek	United Kingdom
Norwegian Wood	Noruwei no Mori	Tran Anh Hung	Japan
Outside the Law	Hors-la-loi	Rachid Bouchareb	France, Algeria, Tunisia, Belgium
Passione		John Turturro	Italy
Passion Play		Mitch Glazer	United States
The Poll Diaries	Poll	Chris Kraus	Germany
Rabbit Hole		John Cameron Mitchell	United States
Repeaters		Carl Bessai	Canada
Rio Sex Comedy		Jonathan Nossiter	France, Brazil
A Screaming Man	Un homme qui crie	Mahamat-Saleh Haroun	France, Belgium, Chad
Special Treatment	Sans queue ni tête	Jeanne Labrune	France, Luxembourg, Belgium
Stone		John Curran	United States
Submarine		Richard Ayoade	United Kingdom
Tamara Drewe		Stephen Frears	United Kingdom
That Girl in Yellow Boots		Anurag Kashyap	India
Trigger		Bruce McDonald	Canada
The Trip		Michael Winterbottom	United Kingdom
Trust		David Schwimmer	United States
What's Wrong With Virginia		Dustin Lance Black	United States
The Whistleblower		Larysa Kondracki	Canada, Germany
You Will Meet a Tall Dark Stranger		Woody Allen	United Kingdom, United States, Spain

=== Masters ===
English title	Original title	Director(s)	Production country
13 Assassins	Jūsannin no Shikaku	Takashi Miike	Japan
Erotic Man		Jørgen Leth	Denmark
Essential Killing		Jerzy Skolimowski	Poland
Film Socialisme		Jean-Luc Godard	France
I Wish I Knew	海上传奇	Jia Zhang-ke	China
Mysteries of Lisbon	Mistérios de Lisboa	Raúl Ruiz	Portugal, France
Nostalgia for the Light	Nostalgia de la luz	Patricio Guzmán	France, Germany, Chile
Poetry	Si	Lee Chang-dong	South Korea, France
Roses à crédit		Amos Gitai	France
Route Irish		Ken Loach	United Kingdom, France, Belgium
The Sleeping Beauty	La belle endormie	Catherine Breillat	France
The Strange Case of Angelica	O Estranho Caso de Angélica	Manoel de Oliveira	Portugal
Uncle Boonmee Who Can Recall His Past Lives	Lung Bunmi Raluek Chat	Apichatpong Weerasethakul	Thailand

=== Midnight Madness ===
English title	Original title	Director(s)	Production country
Bunraku		Guy Moshe	United States
The Butcher, the Chef and the Swordsman	Dāo Jiàn Xiào	Wuershan	China, Hong Kong, United States
Fire of Conscience	火龍	Dante Lam	Hong Kong, China
Fubar II		Michael Dowse	Canada
Insidious		James Wan	Canada, United States, United Kingdom
Red Nights	Les Nuits rouges du Bourreau de Jade	Julien Carbon, Laurent Courtiaud	France, Hong Kong
Stake Land		Jim Mickle	United States
Super		James Gunn	United States
Vanishing on 7th Street		Brad Anderson	United States
The Ward		John Carpenter	United States

=== Canada First! ===
English title	Original title	Director(s)	Production country
Amazon Falls		Katrin Bowen	Canada
Daydream Nation		Mike Goldbach	Canada
High Cost of Living		Deborah Chow	Canada
Oliver Sherman		Ryan Redford	Canada
Suspicions	Jaloux	Patrick Demers	Canada
You Are Here		Daniel Cockburn	Canada

=== Canadian Open Vault ===
English title	Original title	Director(s)	Production country
A Married Couple		Allan King	Canada

=== City to City ===
English title	Original title	Director(s)	Production country
10 to 11	11'e 10 kala	Pelin Esmer	Turkey, France, Germany
40		Emre Sahin	Turkey
Block-C		Zeki Demirkubuz	Turkey
Dark Cloud		Theron Patterson	Turkey
Distant	Uzak	Nuri Bilge Ceylan	Turkey
Hair		Tayfun Pirselimoğlu	Turkey
The Majority		Seren Yüce	Turkey
My Only Sunshine		Reha Erdem	Turkey, Greece, Bulgaria
September 12		Özlem Sulak	Turkey, Germany
Somersault in a Coffin	Tabutta Rövaşata	Dervis Zaim	Turkey

=== Contemporary World Cinema ===
English title	Original title	Director(s)	Production country
22nd of May	Tweeëntwintig mei	Koen Mortier	Belgium
Africa United		Debs Gardner-Paterson	United Kingdom
Aftershock		Feng Xiaogang	China
All About Love	De xian chao fan	Ann Hui	Hong Kong
Anything You Want	Todo lo que tú quieras	Achero Mañas	Spain
Bad Faith	Ond tro	Kristian Petri	Sweden
Behind Blue Skies	Himlen är oskyldigt blå	Hannes Holm	Sweden
Black Ocean	Noir océan	Marion Hänsel	Belgium, France, Germany
Blessed Events	Glückliche Fügung	Isabelle Stever	Germany
Break Up Club	分手說愛你	Barbara Wong	Hong Kong
Carancho		Pablo Trapero	Argentina, Chile, Spain, France, South Korea
Chico & Rita	Chico y Rita	Fernando Trueba, Javier Mariscal, Tono Errando	Spain, United Kingdom, Canada, France, Hungary, Philippines
Crying Out	À l'origine d'un cri	Robin Aubert	Canada
Detective Dee and the Mystery of the Phantom Flame	狄仁傑之通天帝國	Tsui Hark	China, Hong Kong
The Edge	Kray	Alexei Uchitel	Russia
Even the Rain	También la lluvia	Icíar Bollaín	Spain, Mexico, France
The First Grader		Justin Chadwick	United Kingdom, United States, Kenya
The Fourth Portrait	第四張畫	Chung Mong-Hong	Taiwan
Home for Christmas	Hjem til jul	Bent Hamer	Norway
How I Ended This Summer	Kak ya provyol etim letom	Alexei Popogrebsky	Russia
The Human Resources Manager	hliḥuto shel Ha'Memuneh al Mash'abey Enosh	Eran Riklis	Israel
The Hunter	Shekarchi	Rafi Pitts	Iran
I Am Slave		Gabriel Range	United Kingdom
Jucy		Louise Alston	Australia
Lapland Odyssey	Napapiirin sankarit	Dome Karukoski	Finland
Late Autumn	Manchu	Kim Tae-yong	South Korea
Leap Year	Año bisiesto	Michael Rowe	Mexico
Life, Above All		Oliver Schmitz	South Africa
The Light Thief	Svet-Ake	Aktan Arym Kubat	Kyrgyzstan
Mamma Gógó		Fridrik Thor Fridriksson	Iceland
Matariki		Michael Bennett	New Zealand
The Matchmaker	פעם הייתי	Avi Nesher	Israel
Meek's Cutoff		Kelly Reichardt	United States
Modra		Ingrid Veninger	Canada
My Joy	Счастье моё	Sergei Loznitsa	Germany, Netherlands, Ukraine
Neds		Peter Mullan	United Kingdom, France, Italy
A Night for Dying Tigers		Terry Miles	Canada
Of Gods and Men	Des hommes et des dieux	Xavier Beauvois	France
Oki's Movie	Ok-hi-eui Yeonghwa	Hong Sangsoo	South Korea
Outbound	Periferic	Bogdan George Apetri	Romania
Route 132		Louis Bélanger	Canada
Sensation		Tom Hall	Ireland
Silent Souls	Овся́нки	Aleksei Fedorchenko	Russia
Small Town Murder Songs		Ed Gass-Donnelly	Canada
The Solitude of Prime Numbers	La solitudine dei numeri primi	Saverio Constanzo	Italy
State of Violence		Khalo Matabane	South Africa, France
Tender Son: The Frankenstein Project	Szelíd teremtés: A Frankenstein-terv	Kornél Mundruczó	Hungary
Tracker		Ian Sharp	United Kingdom, New Zealand
Three	Drei	Tom Tykwer	Germany
White Irish Drinkers		John Gray	United States
Womb		Benedek Fliegauf	Germany, Hungary, France

=== Vanguard ===
English title	Original title	Director(s)	Production country
At Ellen's Age	In Alter von Ellen	Pia Marais	Germany
The Christening	Chrzest	Marcin Wrona	Poland
Cold Fish	Tsumetai Nettaigyo	Sion Sono	Japan
Confessions	Kokuhaku	Tetsuya Nakashima	Japan
Easy Money	Snabba cash	Daniel Espinosa	Sweden
A Horrible Way to Die		Adam Wingard	United States
Kaboom		Gregg Araki	United States, France
L.A. Zombie		Bruce LaBruce	Germany, United States
Microphone	ميكروفون	Ahmad Abdalla	Egypt
Monsters		Gareth Edwards	United Kingdom
Our Day Will Come	Notre jour viendra	Romain Gavras	France

=== Discovery ===
English title	Original title	Director(s)	Production country
As If I Am Not There	Kao da me nema	Juanita Wilson	Ireland, Macedonia, Sweden
Attenberg		Athina Rachel Tsangari	Greece
Autumn	Harud	Aamir Bashir	India
Beautiful Boy		Shawn Ku	United States
Blame		Michael Henry	Australia
The Call	Il richiamo	Stefano Pasetto	Italy, Argentina
Ceremony		Max Winkler	United States
Dirty Girl		Abe Sylvia	United States
Girlfriend		Justin Lerner	United States
Griff the Invisible		Leon Ford	Australia
Half of Oscar	La mitad de Oscar	Manuel Martin Cuenca	Spain, Cuba
Inside America		Barbara Eder	Austria
Look, Stranger		Arielle Javitch	United States
Mandoo		Ebrahim Saeedi	Iraq
Marimbas from Hell	Marimbas del Infierno	Julio Hernández Cordón	Guatemala, France, Mexico
Norberto's Deadline	Norberto apenas tarde	Daniel Hendler	Uruguay, Argentina
October	Octubre	Diego Vega, Daniel Vega	Peru
The Piano in a Factory	Gang de qin	Zhang Meng	China
Pinoy Sunday	Táiběi Xīngqítiān	Wei-Ting Ho	Taiwan
The Place in Between	Notre Étrangère	Sarah Bouyain	Burkina Faso
Rare Exports: A Christmas Tale		Jalmari Helander	Finland
Sandcastle		Boo Junfeng	Singapore
Soul of Sand	Pairon Talle	Sidharth Srinivasan	India
Viva Riva!		Djo Tunda Wa Munga	Democratic Republic of the Congo
Wasted on the Young		Ben C. Lucas	Australia
What I Most Want	Lo que más quiero	Delfina Castagnino	Argentina
Zephyr	Zefir	Belma Bas	Turkey

=== Future Projections ===
English title	Original title	Director(s)	Production country
24 Hour Psycho Back and Forth and To and Fro		Douglas Gordon	United Kingdom
Angst Essen/Eat Fear		Ming Wong	Germany
HEAVENHELL		Chris Chong Chan Fui, Yasuhiro Morinaga	Malaysia
In Love for the Mood		Ming Wong	Singapore
Jeanne		Martin Arnold	Austria
Journey to the Moon		William Kentridge	South Africa
Klatsassin		Stan Douglas	Canada
Man With a Movie Camera: The Global Remake		Perry Bard	United States
Nyman with a Movie Camera		Michael Nyman	United Kingdom
Otolith III		The Otolith Group	United Kingdom
Slidelength		Michael Snow	Canada
Soft Rains#6: Suburban Horror (part 1)		Jennifer McCoy, Kevin McCoy	United States
Workers Leaving the Factory in Eleven Decades		Harun Farocki	Germany

=== Real to Reel ===
English title	Original title	Director(s)	Production country
ANPO: Art X War		Linda Hoaglund	United States
Armadillo		Janus Metz	Denmark
Boxing Gym		Frederick Wiseman	United States
Cave of Forgotten Dreams		Werner Herzog	United States
Client 9: The Rise and Fall of Eliot Spitzer		Alex Gibney	United States
Cool It		Ondi Timoner	United States
The Game of Death	Le Jeu de la mort	Christophe Nick, Thomas Bornot	France, Switzerland
Genpin		Naomi Kawase	Japan
Guest		Jose Luis Guerin	Spain
How to Start Your Own Country		Jody Shapiro	Canada
Inside Job		Charles Ferguson	United States
Machete Maidens Unleashed!		Mark Hartley	Australia
The Man of a Thousand Songs		William D. MacGillivray	Canada
Mother of Rock: Lillian Roxon		Paul Clarke	Australia
Pink Saris		Kim Longinotto	United Kingdom
The Pipe	An Piopa	Risteard Ó Domhnaill	Ireland
Precious Life		Shlomi Eldar	Israel
The Sound of Mumbai: A Musical		Sarah McCarthy	United Kingdom
Tabloid		Errol Morris	United States
Tears of Gaza		Vibeke Løkkeberg	Norway
When My Child is Born		Guo Jing, Ke Dingding	China
Windfall		Laura Israel	United States
!Women Art Revolution: A Secret History		Lynn Hershman Leeson	United States

=== Sprockets Family Zone ===
English title	Original title	Director(s)	Production country
Karla and Jonas		Charlotte Sachs Bostrup	Denmark
Little Sister		Richard Bowen	China, United States
Make Believe		J. Clay Tweel	United States
A Turtle's Tale: Sammy's Adventures		Ben Stassen	Belgium

=== Visions ===
English title	Original title	Director(s)	Production country
The Autobiography of Nicolae Ceaușescu	Autobiografia lui Nicolae Ceaușescu	Andrei Ujică	Romania
Brownian Movement		Nanouk Leopold	Netherlands, Germany, Belgium
Curling		Denis Côté	Canada
The Ditch		Wang Bing	France, Belgium
The Four Times	Le quattro volte	Michelangelo Frammartino	Italy, Germany, Switzerland
K.364 A Journey by Train		Douglas Gordon	United Kingdom, Germany, France
Moscow 11:19:31		Michael Nyman	United Kingdom
Mourning for Anna	Trois temps après la mort d'Anna	Catherine Martin	Canada
Over Your Cities Grass Will Grow		Sophie Fiennes	France
Promises Written in Water		Vincent Gallo	United States
Summer of Goliath	Verano de Goliat	Nicolás Pereda	Canada, Mexico, Netherlands
A Useful Life	La vida útil	Federico Veiroj	Uruguay

=== Wavelengths ===
English title	Original title	Director(s)	Production country
753 Macpherson Avenue		Kevin Jerome Everson	United States
Anne Truitt Working		Jem Cohen	United States
Atlantiques		Mati Diop	Senegal, France
Aubade		Nathaniel Dorsky	United States
Bits and Pieces		EYE Film Institute Netherlands	Netherlands
Blow-Ups: Portrait, Tea Time, Red Curtain		Helga Fanderl	Germany
Blue Mantle		Rebecca Meyers	United States
Burning Bush		Vincent Grenier	Canada, United States
Cinematographie		Philipp Fleischmann	Austria
Color Films 1 & 2		Madison Brookshire	United States
Coming Attractions		Peter Tscherkassky	Austria
Compline		Nathaniel Dorsky	United States
The Day Was a Scorcher		Ken Jacobs	United States
Delphine de Oliveira		Friedl vom Gröller	Austria
Get Out of the Car		Thom Andersen	United States
Hell Roaring Creek		Lucien Castaing-Taylor	United States
Home Movie		John Price	Canada
Kodachrome Days		Jonas Mekas	United States
Landscape, Semi-Surround		Eriko Sonoda	Japan
Leona Alone		Oliver Husain	Canada
One		Eve Heller	Austria
Ouverture		Christopher Becks	Canada, France
Pastourelle		Nathaniel Dorsky	United States
Photo Finish Figures	Il finish delle figure	Paolo Gioli	Italy
Ruhr		James Benning	Germany, United States
Slaveship		T. Marie	United States
The Soul of Things		Dominic Angerame	United States
Tokyo-Ebisu		Tomonari Nishikawa	Japan
Victoria, George, Edward & Thatcher		Callum Cooper	United Kingdom
Water Lilies		T. Marie	United States

=== Short Cuts ===
English title	Original title	Director(s)	Production country
Above the Knee		Greg Atkins	Canada
The Adder's Bite		Firas Momani	Canada
Animal Control		Kire Paputts	Canada
The Camera and Christopher Merk		Brandon Cronenberg	Canada
Champagne		Hans Olson	Canada
The Closer You Get to Canada		John Bolton	Canada
Eggcellent		Martin Sokol	Canada
File Under Miscellaneous		Jeff Barnaby	Canada
A Fine Young Man		Kevan Funk	Canada
Green Crayons		Kazik Radwanski	Canada
The High Level Bridge		Trevor Anderson	Canada
Home: Life Advice		Aaron Phelan	Canada
How to Rid Your Lover of a Negative Emotion Caused by You		Nadia Litz	Canada
Interregnum		Nick Fox-Gieg	Canada
The Legend of Beaver Dam		Jerome Sable	Canada
Lipsett Diaries		Theodore Ushev	Canada
Little Flowers	Les Fleurs de l'âge	Vincent Biron	Canada
Living History		Isaac Cravit	Canada
Love. Marriage. Miscarriage.		Darragh McDonald	Canada
Marius Borodine		Emanuel Hoss-Desmarais	Canada
Manèges		Sophie Goyette	Canada
La Métropolitaine		Dan Popa	Canada
Mokhtar		Halima Ouardiri	Canada
Negativipeg		Matthew Rankin	Canada
The Old Ways		Michael Vass	Canada
On the Way to the Sea		Tao Gu	Canada
The Open Window		Cam Woykin	Canada
Poudre		Ky Nam Le Duc	Canada
Le Projet Sapporo		Marie-Josée Saint-Pierre	Canada
Sad Bear		Liz Cairns, Joe LoBianco	Canada
Les Softies		Emmanuel Shirinian, Russell Bennett	Canada
Sophie Lavoie		Anne Émond	Canada
The Trenches	La Tranchée	Claude Cloutier	Canada
Tsunami, Horses and Civilization		Carla Susanto	Canada
Turkey		Sara St. Onge	Canada
Vapor		Kaveh Nabatian	Canada
Wapawekka		Danis Goulet	Canada
Warchild		Caroline Monnet	Canada
Woman Waiting		Antoine Bourges	Canada
yesno		Brian D. Johnson	Canada

== Canada's Top Ten ==
TIFF's annual Canada's Top Ten list, its national critics and festival programmers poll of the ten best feature and short films of the year, was released on December 15, 2010.

=== Feature films ===
- Barney's Version — Richard J. Lewis
- Curling — Denis Côté
- Heartbeats (Les Amours imaginaires) — Xavier Dolan
- The High Cost of Living — Deborah Chow
- Incendies — Denis Villeneuve
- Last Train Home — Lixin Fan
- Modra — Ingrid Veninger
- Mourning for Anna (Trois temps après la mort d'Anna) — Catherine Martin
- Splice — Vincenzo Natali
- Trigger — Bruce McDonald

=== Short films ===
- Above the Knee — Greg Atkins
- I Was a Child of Holocaust Survivors — Ann Marie Fleming
- The Legend of Beaver Dam — Jerome Sable
- Lipsett Diaries — Theodore Ushev
- Little Flowers (Les Fleurs de l'âge) — Vincent Biron
- The Little White Cloud That Cried — Guy Maddin
- Marius Borodine — Emanuel Hoss-Desmarais
- Mokhtar — Halima Ouardiri
- On the Way to the Sea — Tao Gu
- Vapor — Kaveh Nabatian
