= Last Night (2010 film) =

2010 film by Massy Tadjedin

- Theatrical release poster
- Directed by: Massy Tadjedin
- Written by: Massy Tadjedin
- Produced by: Sidonie Dumas; Massy Tadjedin; Nick Wechsler
- Starring: Keira Knightley; Sam Worthington; Eva Mendes; Guillaume Canet
- Cinematography: Peter Deming
- Edited by: Susan E. Morse
- Music by: Clint Mansell
- Production company: Gaumont
- Distributed by: Gaumont (France); Tribeca Film (United States); Miramax (select territories)
- Release dates: September 18, 2010 (TIFF); February 16, 2011 (France); May 6, 2011 (United States)
- Running time: 92 minutes
- Countries: France; United States
- Language: English
- Box office: $7.7 million

Last Night is a 2010 romantic drama film that was written and directed by Massy Tadjedin, her directorial debut. The film follows married couple Joanna (Keira Knightley) and Michael Reed (Sam Worthington), who are tempted by different forms of infidelity when they spend a night apart following a fight. Joanna is emotionally drawn to her ex-boyfriend Alex Mann (Guillaume Canet) while Michael is physically attracted to his co-worker Laura Nunez (Eva Mendes). The cast includes Griffin Dunne, Daniel Eric Gold, Anson Mount, Stephanie Romanov, Scott Adsit, Justine Cotsonas, and Chriselle Almeida. Last Night was produced by Entertainment One in association with Gaumont, and deals with questions about emotional and physical infidelity.

The film was developed as a romance and suspense story before Tadjedin recognized its moral significance. After persuading Knightley to break a year-long acting hiatus to participate in the film, Tadjedin cast the other roles with consideration for the actors' chemistry. Mendes originally turned down the role of Laura but agreed to appear in the film after a conversation with Tadjedin. The soundtrack was composed by Clint Mansell, who received a World Soundtrack Award for Soundtrack Composer of the Year for his work.

Miramax Films initially bought Last Night for a March 19, 2010 release, but it was delayed by the company's sale to Filmyard Holdings. The film was shown at the 2010 Toronto International Film Festival and the 2010 Rome Film Festival. It premiered theatrically in France on February 16, 2011, and had a limited release in the United States on May 6, 2011. It was released through video on demand. Critics were divided over the film's plot and its commentary on infidelity; the performances from Knightley, Canet, and Mendes received praise while Worthington and the scenes between Michael and Laura were the subject of criticism. Last Night grossed $7.7 million, primarily from foreign markets.

== Plot ==
Writer Joanna and Michael Reed, a commercial real estate agent, are a married couple who live in an apartment in New York City. During a party with Michael's colleagues, she notices him spending time with Laura Nunez, an attractive co-worker and wonders why he has not previously mentioned her. Joanna suspects Michael is having an affair, so confronts him about it when they return home. They argue but reconcile later that night.

The following day, Michael leaves on a business trip to Philadelphia with his associates Laura and Andy; Joanna stays behind to work on a novel. She meets her ex-boyfriend Alex Mann; they go to a bar later that day, and have dinner with two of his friends, Sandra and Truman. They discuss their past relationship and Joanna's marriage to Michael; she has never told Michael about Alex.

Joanna and Alex return to Andy's apartment, where they talk about their previous romance, having got back together after Michael briefly broke off his relationship with Joanna. She goes out to walk Andy's dog; he accidentally locks them outside. They go to a party with Sandra, Truman, and the dog.

Joanna and Alex grow closer over the course of the night, and they eventually kiss. After the party, they return to his hotel room. Joanna refuses to have sex with him and they instead spend the night embracing each other in bed. The next day, they kiss before he leaves New York, broken-hearted.

Scenes depicting Joanna's night with Alex are interspersed with scenes showing Michael and Laura. After having dinner with a client, she invites him out for drinks at the hotel bar. Michael tells her he has never cheated on his wife. They go to the hotel pool, where they strip to their underwear and swim together.

Michael and Laura return to her room and have sex. The following morning, he finds a note from Joanna in which she apologizes for their fight and says she trusts him. Feeling guilty, Michael leaves Philadelphia early. Laura and Andy give their presentation to their clients without him.

Upon returning to their apartment, Michael finds Joanna crying. They make plans for the day in an attempt to resume their normal lives. They embrace and he says that he loves her. Joanna is puzzled by Michael's sudden show of affection and early return from work. Michael notices that she left out a pair of expensive shoes from the night before and that she is wearing her sexiest underwear. The film ends as Joanna prepares to speak.

== Cast ==
The cast includes:

- Keira Knightley as Joanna Reed
- Sam Worthington as Michael Reed
- Eva Mendes as Laura Nunez
- Guillaume Canet as Alex Mann
- Daniel Eric Gold as Andy
- Anson Mount as Neal
- Griffin Dunne as Truman
- Stephanie Romanov as Sandra
- Scott Adsit as Stuart
- Justine Cotsonas as Maggie
- Rae Ritke as Barbara
- Chriselle Almeida as Chris

== Production ==
=== Development ===
I think the gray is the part of life I am most drawn to — I think that grey area is where most of us live. I wanted to portray these characters sympathetically and honestly and just sort of show how even people with the best of intentions can find themselves in these predicaments. —Tadjedin on the film's treatment of infidelity

Massy Tadjedin wrote and filmed Last Night, which was her directorial debut after writing the screenplays for the films Leo (2002) and The Jacket (2005). She completed the script roughly four and a half years prior to its release; she developed the scenes out of sequence and wrote them with Microsoft Word. Tadjedin said she struggled with writing characters that "would come across as real people, that their struggle was believable".

After a negative response from a Warner Bros. studio executive on the script's formatting, she realized Final Draft was the preferred software for screenwriters. In early drafts, the story was set between Los Angeles and New Mexico; the setting was later changed to New York City, which Tadjedin described as a "place where the diverse characters could come together". She clarified that the location change did not affect the plot, because she wanted to portray the characters' relationships in a more universal context rather than tied to a specific city. Requesting seven million dollars for production, she had difficulty with financing the film, and rejected a potential source for not understanding her "artistic vision". The Los Angeles Times partially attributed the difficulty in selling Last Night to a film studio to it being an adult drama, which it described as "endangered in Hollywood".

Tadjedin pictured Last Night as a romance or a thriller at first, but realized its commentary on infidelity while assembling the cast and crew. Monogamy was identified by some media outlets as a related topic explored in the movie. Tadjedin likened Last Night to a slice of life story, a genre that she enjoyed in her childhood, while Griffin Dunne identified it more as a "moral thriller" due to its focus on "a universal passage in a long-term relationship". Critics compared the storyline and characters to those of a Woody Allen film, such as The Globe and Mail calling it "a New York morality play" set in Allen's "emotional and physical terrain". The Ottawa Sun described the tone as being "vaguely European-feeling" and "cosmopolitan".

=== Casting ===
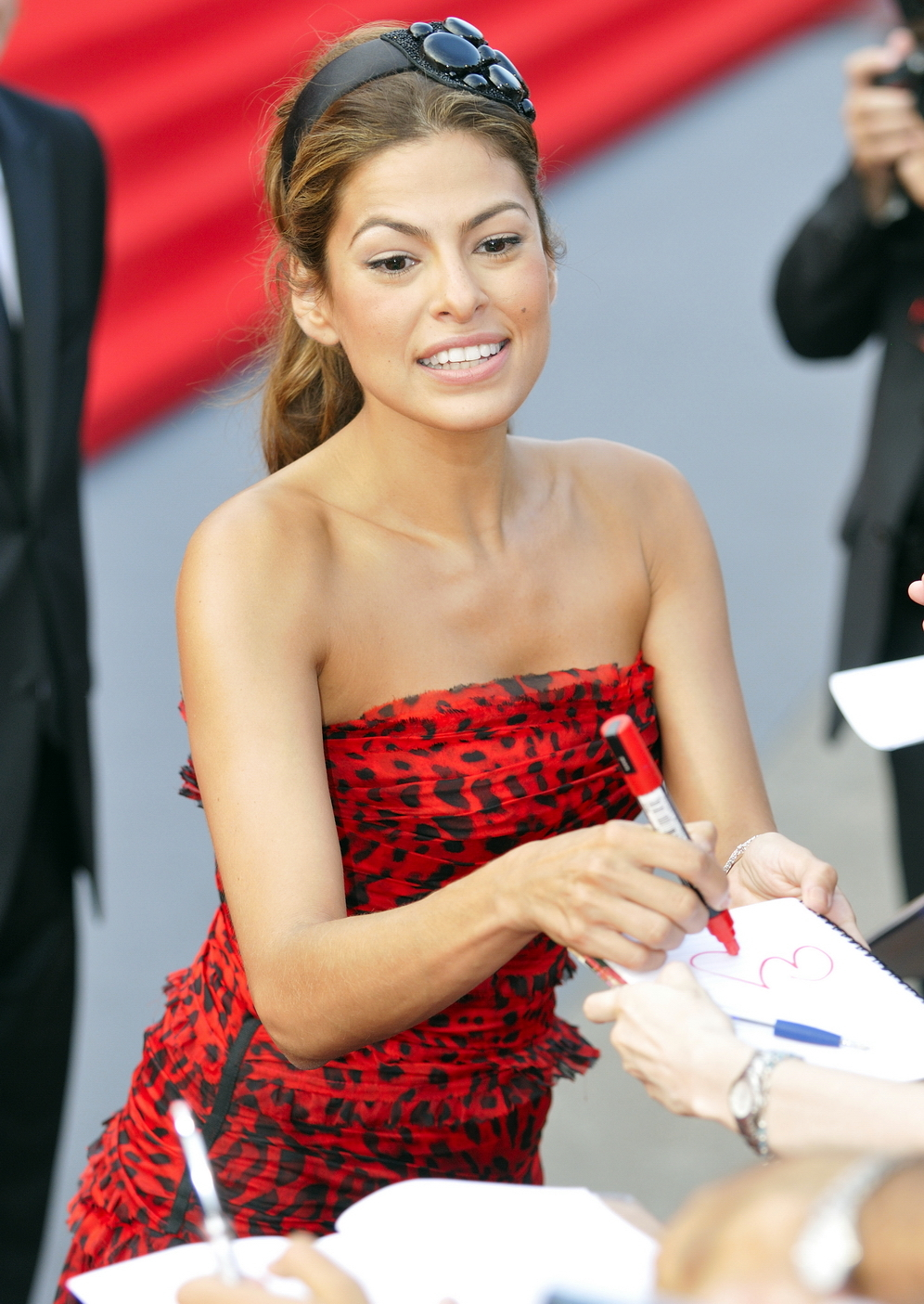
Despite reservations, Mendes agreed to play Laura after a discussion with Tadjedin.

According to Tadjedin, the casting was "very chemistry dependent" to ensure each relationship felt authentic. She said the addition of Keira Knightley had "anchored the casting process". Knightley and Tadjedin had become friends following their collaboration on The Jacket. When asked if she had written Joanna for Knightley, Tadjedin said she imagined the character instead as a cross between Natalie Wood and Julie Christie. Last Night was Knightley's first project after a mental breakdown at the age of 22 and hiatus early in 2009; Knightley said her return to acting had helped improve her mental health. Tadjedin persuaded Knightley to be a part of Last Night while visiting her in Saint-Germain-des-Prés.

Knightley said that she was drawn to the film's commentary on physical versus emotional infidelity. When asked about her approach to Joanna, she said that she relied on her imagination and empathy for the character, clarifying she was not a method actress. During a 2018 interview with Peter Travers, Knightley cited Last Night as one of four films that meant the most to her; she enjoyed it for the collaboration with the cast and crew and its more naturalistic style of acting.

Tadjedin approached the male leads based on their chemistry with Knightley. After watching Sam Worthington in the 2004 film Somersault, Tadjedin sent him the script for Last Night, and met with him on-set for the 2009 film Avatar. She hired the actor due to his "great sympathy for the character of Michael" and her impression that he would have a "a great married chemistry" with Knightley. Tadjedin approached Guillaume Canet about his role during a screening of his 2006 film Tell No One. Some lines were cut between Knightley and Canet to focus on "their tension from looks". Tadjedin said that she wanted to represent the characters' anxiety through movement rather than dialogue.

Eva Mendes was cast as Laura based on the warmth she brought to the character. Reluctant to join the project, Mendes worried that Laura would "lack originality" and be "too seductive". She agreed to the part after meeting with Tadjedin, and said: "It was great to connect with a female director and talk about this woman and not objectify her as the other woman but give her a real true life and make her honest…. Thank God I did." Tadjedin emphasized that Laura was not written as a "homewrecker" or a "temptress".

=== Filming and post-production ===
During production, Last Night was known as Tell Me. The location for Michael and Joanna's Tribeca apartment was found after a three-week search. Producers required a space with an elevator and enough room to accommodate a filming crew. Tadjedin wanted the apartment's furniture to represent the characters' personalities and the state of their relationship because the film does not depict their histories. She intended to portray Michael and Joanna as "a successful working couple" rather than "a very rarefied couple in New York", though she settled for the larger set due to time constraints. About the film's overall look, she wanted to represent everyday life in downtown New York. Filming ended in the summer of 2009.

The actors used their natural accents for the characters, a decision Worthington had attributed to New York's identification as a melting pot. He asked Tadjedin to remove a line referencing Michael and Joanna taking a flight home, saying, "Don't fuckin' have me explain why I'm from Australia". Tadjedin explained that the international cast was not intentional, but said that "it felt really organic". While the cast represented multiple nationalities, the crew was entirely American. During production, the cast and crew discussed their views on infidelity and shared their personal experiences with each other.

The film was developed by Entertainment One in association with Gaumont; its final cut runs for 92 minutes. Gaumont financed Last Night, helped to release it in France, and handled sales. Gaumont CEO Christophe Riandee said the company acquired the movie to prove its "determination to go forward with high-end English-speaking productions". Tadjedin produced the film with Nick Wechsler and Sidonie Dumas. Wechsler had previously attempted to put Tadjedin's other scripts into production. Christophe Riandee and Buddy Enright were the executive producers, and Satsuki Mitchell was a co-producer. Susan E. Morse edited the film and the production design was handled by Tim Grimes. Peter Deming worked as the movie's director of photography, and Ann Roth created the costumes.

== Soundtrack ==
Clint Mansell composed the soundtrack for Last Night, and Peter Broderick wrote lyrics and provided vocals for certain parts. Following a request from Tadjedin, Broderick re-recorded his song "Not At Home" with Mansell for the film's final scene. Milan Records and Warner Classics released the soundtrack on an audio CD and as a digital download on September 6, 2011. Mansell was nominated for a World Soundtrack Award for Soundtrack Composer of the Year.

== Release and box office ==
During the third week of its production, Miramax Films purchased Last Night for distribution. Originally set for a March 19, 2010 release, it was postponed following the company's closure. The Walt Disney Company, the parent company of Miramax Films at the time, was initially "unwilling to do anything with the film for fear of stepping on the toes of Miramax's eventual buyer", but later allowed it to be shown at the 2010 Toronto International Film Festival, where it premiered as the closing film. Collider considered it to be "one of the more under-reported films". According to CinemaBlend.com, the film received a positive response from the festival's audience.

The film's distribution rights were acquired by Tribeca Film. Last Night was shown as the opener for the 2010 Rome Film Festival; the cast was unable to walk the red carpet for the movie due to protests by the Centoautori movement. The protest was held in response to Prime Minister Silvio Berlusconi's decision to stop tax exemptions for film productions and reduce funds for cultural events. As part of the festival, the film was one of sixteen nominated for the Golden Marc'Aurelio Award.

A preview of the movie was released online in March 2011. Last Night first premiered theatrically in France on February 16, 2011, and was made available on video on demand on April 20, 2011. The film had a limited release in ten US theaters on May 6, 2011, where it received an R rating from the Motion Picture Association of America due to language and sexuality. Prior to its theatrical premiere in 2011, Tadjedin and Deming received nominations for their directorial and cinematography work at the 2010 Camerimage awards.

Grossing $29,505 on its opening weekend, Last Night went on to earn $7,743,923 worldwide; $98,986 in the US and $7,644,937 from foreign markets. The film was removed from US theaters on June 2, 2011; it was later released in other countries between 2011 and 2017 through different distributors. It grossed the most ($2,386,504) in France and the least ($3,026) in New Zealand, following its premiere there on October 12, 2017. Last Night was released on home video and streaming services on August 1, 2011; it was made available on iTunes and Netflix. The film was later packaged as part of the Echo Bridge Home Entertainment release Epic Romances with Anna Karenina (1948), As You Like It (1936), The Magic Sword (1962), and The Strange Love of Martha Ivers (1946).

== Critical reception ==
Critics praised Tadjedin for not supporting or antagonizing Joanna or Michael. DVD Talk commended Tadjedin for not reducing the characters to "the monsters and angels normally created for cinematic takes on infidelity". In an Entertainment Weekly review, Owen Gleiberman liked that the film examined infidelity beyond only sex. While giving the film a positive review, Hot Press wrote that the effectiveness of its message was entirely "dependent on the viewer's own experiences". Other reviewers criticized the lead characters as boring, including some questioning why the plot was worth caring about. Digital Spy criticized it as a "mostly hollow experience" with a "distinct lack of flesh on the plot's bare bones". Last Night's plot and characters were described as lacking the "appetite for lunatic adventure" of Woody Allen's works, or the emotional stakes of the 2009 film I Am Love. Despite their negative reviews of the overall film, The Japan Times and Politico praised its ending for its ambiguity; Politico described the final scene as an "unconventional and exciting moment" comparable to the jump cuts in the 1992 film Husbands and Wives.

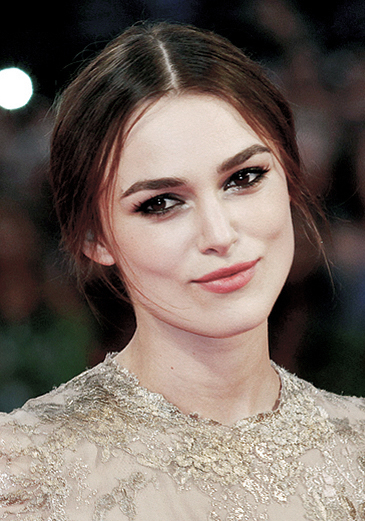
Knightley's performance received positive reviews from critics.

Critics highlighted Knightley, Canet, and Mendes for their performances. Filmmaker said Knightley provided "a layered portrayal of a woman at a crossroads she doesn’t know she’s at", and The A.V. Club likened it to a "Michelle Williams-style moodiness". Interview cited her delivery of the line "What I wouldn’t give to have tired of you" as an example of her "quietly devastating performance". Despite finding Joanna unsympathetic, The Japan Times praised Knightley's ability to convey pain on screen. Filmmaker singled out Canet and Mendes for creating "original beats in their roles as possible paramours"; The Hollywood Reporter preferred their characters over Joanna and Michael. Mendes was praised as "particularly appealing" by Variety, and for "resisting the urge to overdo (and overvamp) her role the way a lesser actress would" by DVD Talk. Some critics attributed Mendes' character and performance as her way of avoiding typecasting related to her appearance. On the other hand, Politico criticized Canet for appearing more "creepy and presumptuous rather than romantic and sad".

Worthington received criticism for his performance. DVD Talk cited his "dull and lifeless" acting as the film's main problem, and Slant Magazine noted his "idea of underplaying is to go blank". Politico criticized both Worthington and Knightley for being too "tepid" and not realizing their roles' potential. Michael's storyline with Laura was poorly received, particularly in comparison to the scenes between Joanna and Alex. IndieWire did not believe Tadjedin established enough why Michael and Laura have sex beyond a shared physical attraction. Criticizing Worthington and Mendes as lacking chemistry, The Globe and Mail wrote that the pool scene was "ridiculously prim" and Laura was too "tired and remote" with Michael. Other critics said the film was too unbalanced, preferring Joanna over Michael. Den of Geek! wanted the story to be "a little more even-handed towards Michael's character", and The Boston Globe wished Tadjedin was more "generous with the rest of the cast as she is with Knightley".
