= Stoker (soundtrack) =

Stoker (Original Motion Picture Soundtrack)

Film score by Clint Mansell
- Released: 26 February 2013
- Recorded: 2012–2013
- Genre: Film score
- Length: 53:45
- Label: Milan
- Producer: Clint Mansell

Clint Mansell chronology
Last NIght (2011)	Stoker (2013)	Filth (2014)

Singles from Stoker (Original Motion Picture Soundtrack)
- 1. "Becomes the Color" Released: 30 October 2012

Stoker (Original Motion Picture Soundtrack) is the soundtrack to the 2013 psychological thriller film Stoker directed by Park Chan-wook. Featuring musical score composed by Clint Mansell, the soundtrack featured five songs and 12 cues from Mansell's score; one cue was composed by Philip Glass. The album was released by Milan Records on 26 February 2013.

== Background ==
In early 2012, Philip Glass was assigned to score music for the film but was replaced by Clint Mansell in the June of that year. Mansell became a part of the project when Chan-wook attended one of his live concerts at Largo in Los Angeles, contacted him for a private meeting and asked him to see the film which he was currently editing. Mansell watched the final edit of the film and "was blown away by the elegance of the sound to it". After five weeks, he began recording the film's score at AIR Studios in London. He used piano and strings as the primary instruments for the film's ambient soundscape, contrary to his synth scores he had composed for his previous ventures. Emily Wells performed the song "Becomes the Color" which was released as a single on 30 October 2012. Two of Glass's piano compositions, which he curated before his exit, were featured in the film's end credits. The album was released through Milan Records on 26 February 2013, three days before the film. It was unveiled in digital editions along with a vinyl edition limited to 1000 units.

== Critical reception ==
Jeremy Kay of The Guardian described Mansell's score as "eerily dynamic", while Matt Goldberg of Collider called it as "luscious and foreboding". Andy Mesecher of Music Connection wrote "The piano exudes sadness, the strings build perfect suspense while the percussion creates a sense of insanity reflected perfectly by scenes in the film."

== Track listing ==
Stoker (Original Motion Picture Soundtrack) track listing
No.	Title	Artist(s)	Length
1.	"I'm Not Formed by Things That Are of Myself Alone" (dialogue)		1:08
2.	"Becomes the Color"	Emily Wells	4:43
3.	"Happy Birthday (A Death in the Family)"		1:24
4.	"Uncle Charlie"		3:39
5.	"A Whistling Tune from a Lonely Man" (dialogue)		0:39
6.	"The Hunter & the Game"		3:51
7.	"Blossoming"		2:24
8.	"Summer Wine"	Nancy Sinatra; Lee Hazlewood	3:38
9.	"A Family Affair"		2:57
10.	"Becoming..."		5:30
11.	"Duet"	Philip Glass	2:46
12.	"Crawford Institute (Family Secrets)"		4:55
13.	"Stride La Vampa (Verdi)"	Victoria Cortez	2:45
14.	"The Hunter Plays the Game"		3:20
15.	"In Full Bloom"		2:33
16.	"The Hunter Becomes the Game"		2:39
17.	"We Are Not Responsible for Who We Come to Be (Free)"		2:47
18.	"If I Ever Had a Heart" (bonus track)	Clint Mansell; Emily Wells	2:07
Total length:			53:45

== Personnel ==
Credits adapted from CD liner notes.

- Choir – Metro Voices
- Concertmaster – Jenny O'Grady
- Orchestrated and conducted by – Matt Dunkley
- Contractor – Isobel Griffiths
- Assistant contractor – Jo Buckley
- Assistant engineer – Adam Miller, Chris Barrett, Laurence Anslow, Lori Castro
- Liner notes – Park Chan-Wook
- Mastering – Ray Staff
- Orchestra leader – Everton Nelson
- Piano – Dave Hartley
- Recording and mixing – Geoff Foster
- Music editor – Ted Caplan
- Music preparations – Jill Streater
- Soprano vocals – Eloise Irving
- Musical assistance – Nigel Wiesehan
