= Ashleigh Harrington =

Canadian actress (born 1989)

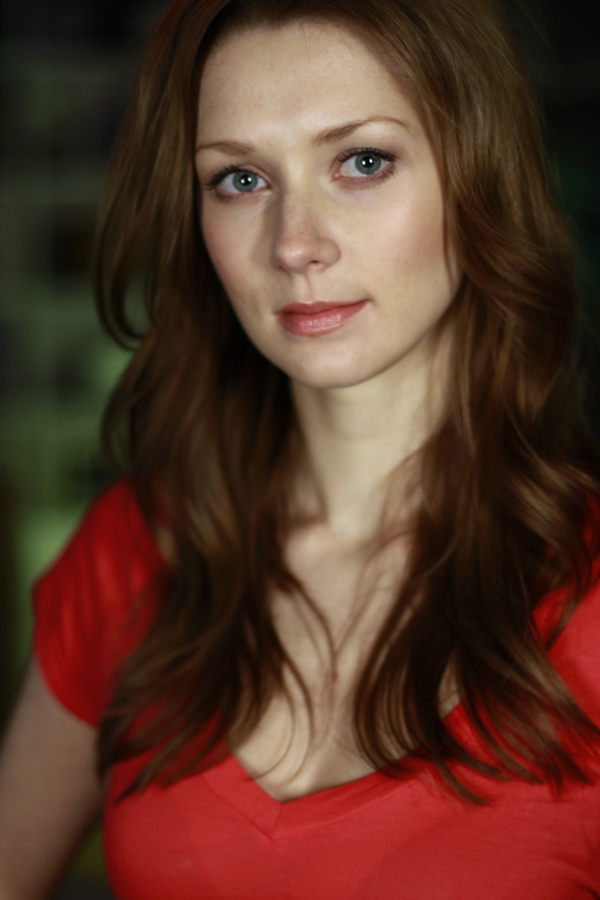
- Ashleigh Harrington in May 2011
- Born: c. 1989 (age 36–37)
- Occupation: Actress
- Years active: 2005–present

Ashleigh Harrington (born c. 1989) is a Canadian actress. She is the star of The Girls on Film and can also be seen in the second season of the BBC America series, Copper, the Netflix TV series Hemlock Grove, Black Friday and Let the Game Begin. She is also a creator and producer of The Girls on Film with the actor Jeff Hammond. In 2011, she won the award for Best Acting in a Trek Viral Video from TrekMovie.com for her portrayal of James T. Kirk in The Girls on Film, as well as Bleedfest Film Festival's Producers Award in May 2011 for The Girls on Film series.

== Filmography ==
Film credits
Year	Film	Role	Notes
2005	Sleepover Nightmare	Yvonne	
2007	Bobbing for Apples	Charity	Also writer and co-producer
2008	Running on Empty	Actress	Also producer.
2009	Black Friday	Ashley	
2010	Let the Game Begin	Anna	
2012	The Lana Del Rey Holiday Album	Lana Del Rey	Also writer and producer

Television credits
Year	Show	Role	Notes
2008	Facebook of Revelations: Jesus 2.0	Temptation Girl	1 episode
2011	The Girls on Film	Various	5 episodes. Also series creator, producer and editor.
2013	Hemlock Grove	Lips	3 episodes
2013	Copper	Eileen	3 episodes
2014	The Good Sister	Cassie	Television film
