= Inside U.S.A. =

Inside U.S.A. or Inside USA may refer to:

- Inside U.S.A. (book), a 1947 book by John Gunther
- Inside U.S.A. (musical), a 1948–1949 Broadway musical revue loosely based on the book
- Inside U.S.A. with Chevrolet, a 1949–1950 American television program
- Inside USA, a 2008 Al-Jazeera documentary series by filmmaker Avi Lewis
- Inside USA, a version of the British reality show Inside

== See also ==
- Inside America, Australian film
- Main Street, U.S.A., Disney attraction
- See the USA in Your Chevrolet
