= Marius Borodine =

- Film poster
- Directed by: Emanuel Hoss-Desmarais
- Written by: Emanuel Hoss-Desmarais; Marc Tulin
- Produced by: Emanuel Hoss-Desmarais; Vincent Hoss-Desmarais
- Starring: Wilson Henley; Vincent Hoss-Desmarais
- Cinematography: Jean-François Lord
- Edited by: Claude-Antoine Guibord
- Production company: Holia Film
- Distributed by: Travelling Distribution
- Release date: July 14, 2010 (JFL)
- Running time: 16 minutes
- Country: Canada
- Language: French

Marius Borodine is a Canadian comedy-drama short film, directed by Emanuel Hoss-Desmarais and released in 2010. Using a mockumentary format, the film features various people discussing the life and legacy of Marius Borodine, a misunderstood scientific genius who invented a machine that could turn any waste product into potable water, but was eventually killed by falling into the machine himself.

The film stars Wilson Henley as Marius Borodine in childhood, and Vincent Hoss-Desmarais as Marius Borodine in adulthood.

The film premiered at the Just for Laughs Film Festival in July 2010. It was subsequently screened at the Fantasia Film Festival, where it won the Coup de cœur Jury Prize, and at the 2010 Toronto International Film Festival.

It was named to the Toronto International Film Festival's year-end Canada's Top Ten list for 2010, and received a Genie Award nomination for Best Live Action Short Drama at the 31st Genie Awards.
