= L'Amour fou (2010 film) =

2010 French film by Pierre Thoretton

- French: Yves Saint Laurent - Pierre Bergé, l'amour fou
- Directed by: Pierre Thoretton
- Screenplay by: Pierre Thoretton; Ève Guillou
- Produced by: Hugues Charbonneau; Kristina Larsen
- Starring: Pierre Bergé; Yves Saint-Laurent
- Cinematography: Léo Hinstin
- Edited by: Dominique Auvray
- Music by: Côme Aguiar; Laurent Lévesque
- Production companies: Les Films du lendemain Les Films de Pierre; France 3 Cinéma
- Release date: 11 September 2010 (TIFF)
- Running time: 98 minutes
- Country: France
- Language: French

L'Amour fou (French: Yves Saint Laurent - Pierre Bergé, l'amour fou) is a French documentary film, directed by Pierre Thoretton and released in 2010. The film profiles the longtime partnership of fashion designer Yves Saint-Laurent and businessman Pierre Bergé, through the lens of the 2009 auction of Saint-Laurent's art collection following his death.

The film was edited from over 2,000 hours of archival film footage of Saint-Laurent and Bergé, and 300 hours of newly shot footage of the auction and Bergé's preparations for it in their home.

The film premiered at the 2010 Toronto International Film Festival.

== Awards ==
At TIFF, the film won the FIPRESCI Prize for the Special Presentations program.

It received a César Award nomination for Best Documentary Film at the 36th César Awards in 2011.
