= Above the Knee =

2010 Canadian film

- Directed by: Greg Atkins
- Written by: Greg Atkins
- Produced by: Greg Atkins
- Starring: Stephen Bogaert
- Cinematography: Jason Tan
- Edited by: Roderick Deogrades; Dominique Naipaul
- Music by: Dustin Peters
- Release date: September 2010 (TIFF)
- Running time: 14 minutes
- Country: Canada
- Language: English

Above the Knee is a Canadian short comedy film, directed by Greg Atkins and released in 2010. The film stars Stephen Bogaert as Jack, an office worker who decides to reject the conformity of corporate dress codes by wearing a skirt to work instead of pants, in turn setting off change within his circles of friends and coworkers.

The film's cast also includes Allen Altman, Victoria Adilman, Loic David, Jeff Hammond and Naomi Snieckus.

The film premiered at the 2010 Toronto International Film Festival. It was subsequently named to TIFF's year-end Canada's Top Ten list for 2010.
