= Vincent Biron =

Canadian film director

Vincent Biron (born 1984 in Pierreville, Quebec) is a Canadian film director. He is most noted for his 2016 feature film debut Prank, and his short film Little Flowers (Les Fleurs de l'âge), which won the Toronto International Film Festival Award for Best Canadian Short Film at the 2010 Toronto International Film Festival.

His second feature film, Barbarians of the Bay (Les Barbares de La Malbaie), was released in 2019. He has also made the short films Audition, Annie et Claude, Soldats, Au bout du rang, Les chose horribles and Une idée de grandeur, and has been a cinematographer for films such as X500, Stone Makers, 9 (9, le film), Mutants, Of Ink and Blood (D'Encre et de sang), With Love (L'Amour), I'll End Up in Jail (Je finirai en prison), Nut Jobs (Les Pas d'allure), Bungalow, Violence and Nobody's Violence.
