= The Star Rover =

1915 science fiction novel by Jack London

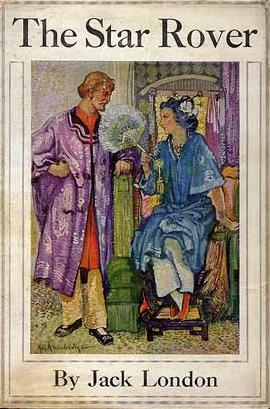
- First edition
- Author: Jack London
- Language: English
- Publisher: Macmillan
- Publication date: 1915
- Publication place: United States
- Pages: 329

The Star Rover is a novel by American writer Jack London published in 1915 (published in the United Kingdom as The Jacket). It is science fiction, and involves both mysticism and reincarnation.

== Plot summary ==
A framing story is told in the first person by Darrell Standing, a university professor serving life imprisonment in San Quentin State Prison for murder. Prison officials try to break his spirit by means of a torture device called "the jacket," a canvas jacket which can be tightly laced so as to compress the whole body, inducing angina. Standing discovers how to withstand the torture by entering a kind of trance state, in which he walks among the stars and experiences portions of past lives.

I trod interstellar space, exalted by the knowledge that I was bound on vast adventure, where, at the end, I would find all the cosmic formulae and have made clear to me the ultimate secret of the universe. In my hand I carried a long glass wand. It was borne in upon me that with the tip of this wand I must touch each star in passing. And I knew, in all absoluteness, that did I but miss one star I should be precipitated into some unplummeted abyss of unthinkable and eternal punishment and guilt.

== Background ==
The accounts of these past lives form the body of the work. They are a series of powerfully written, but disconnected and unresolved, vignettes set in different ages and cultures. According to Kevin Starr, London planned a historical novel about the American West and used some of this material in The Star Rover.

The jacket was actually used at San Quentin at the time; Jack London's descriptions of it were based on interviews with a former convict named Ed Morrell, which London used as a name for a character in the novel. For his role in the Sontag and Evans gang which robbed the Southern Pacific Railroad in the 1890s, Morrell spent fourteen years in California prisons (1894–1908), five of them in solitary confinement. London championed his pardon. After his release, Morrell was a frequent guest at London's Beauty Ranch.

== Adaptations ==
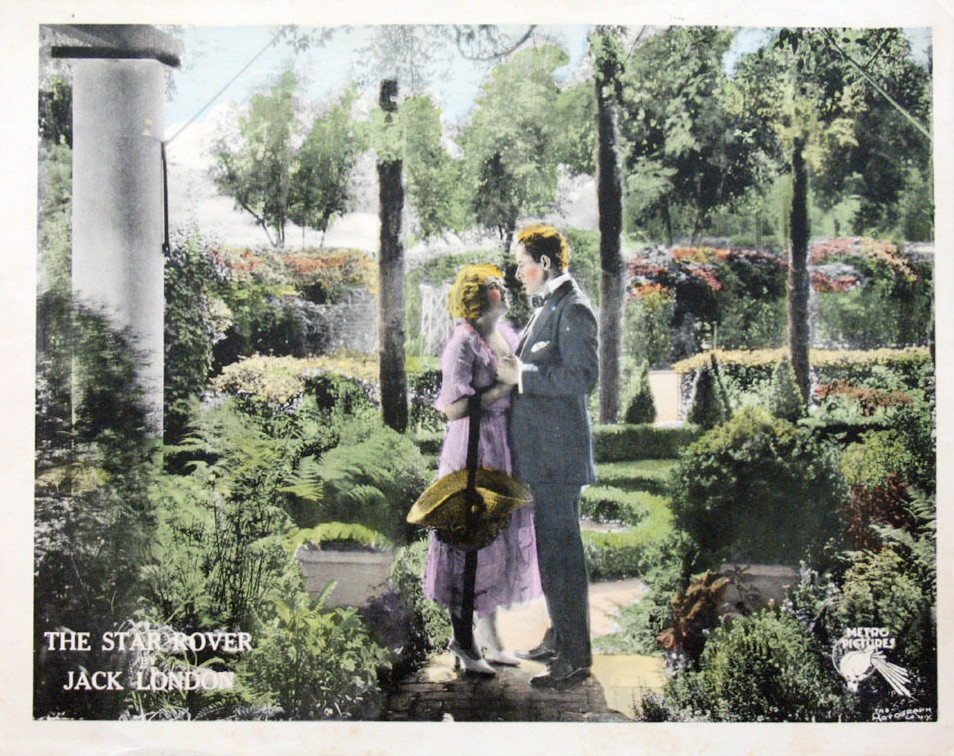
Lobby card for the 1920 film

A silent film based on The Star Rover was released in 1920, starring Courtenay Foote, a well-known stage and screen actor of the time, as Dr. Hugh Standing.

The 2005 movie The Jacket has a story credited to Marc Rocco and Tom Bleecker. Jack London is not mentioned. However, the director has said that the film is "loosely based on a true story that became a Jack London story."

== Legacy ==
H. P. Lovecraft owned a copy of The Star Rover, and Edward Guimont has proposed that it was an influence on his and E. Hoffmann Price's 1933 story "Through the Gates of the Silver Key".

The Star Rover served as inspiration for Robert E. Howard's character James Allison.
