= Little Flowers =

- French: Les fleurs de l'âge
- Directed by: Vincent Biron
- Written by: Vincent Biron
- Produced by: Carolyne Goyette
- Cinematography: Anh Minh Truong
- Edited by: Sophie Farkas Bolla
- Release date: September 14, 2010 (TIFF)
- Running time: 18 minutes
- Country: Canada
- Language: French

Little Flowers (French: Les fleurs de l'âge) is a Canadian short film, directed by Vincent Biron and released in 2010. The film centres on four children who are experiencing significant rites of passage for the first time, in the late summer as their return to the new school year looms.

The film premiered at the 2010 Toronto International Film Festival, where it won the Toronto International Film Festival Award for Best Canadian Short Film. It was subsequently named to TIFF's annual year-end Canada's Top Ten list of the year's best films.
