= Let the Game Begin =

2010 American romantic comedy film

- Directed by: Amit Gupta
- Written by: Amit Gupta
- Produced by: Bruno Rosato; Brandon Hogan; Robert Bajorek; Jesse Newhouse; Joseph DiMaio; Neeraj Bansal
- Starring: Thomas Ian Nicholas; Adam Rodriguez; Lisa Ray; Lochlyn Munro; James Avery; Stephen Baldwin; Michael Madsen; Ken Davitian; Natasha Henstridge; Diora Baird; Caroline Néron; Jesse Jane; Adele Jones; Zan Perrion
- Edited by: Bryan Roberts; Tunnel Post
- Music by: Ralph Rieckermann; Austin Wintory
- Production companies: Twisted Light Productions; Blue Marlin Productions
- Release date: May 5, 2010
- Running time: 93 minutes
- Country: United States
- Language: English

Let the Game Begin is a 2010 American romantic comedy film directed by Amit Gupta and starring Thomas Ian Nicholas, Adam Rodriguez, Lisa Ray, Lochlyn Munro, James Avery, Stephen Baldwin, and Michael Madsen. The film follows two cousins who partner with a Wall Street broker to start a business.

The film was produced by Twisted Light Productions and released in Australia on May 5, 2010.

== Cast ==
- Adam Rodriguez as Rowan
  - Sid Curtis as Young Rowan
- Stephen Baldwin as David Carroll
- Lisa Ray as Eva
- Michael Madsen as Dr. Turner
- Diora Baird as Kate
- Thomas Ian Nicholas as Tripp
- Jesse Jane as Temptation
- Jennifer Rhodes as Hope
- Lochlyn Munro as Gary Johnson
- Ken Davitian as Eric Banks
- Natasha Henstridge as Angela
- James Avery as Hanley
- Zan Perrion as himself
- Caroline Neron as Samantha
- James Matador as Matador, PUA
- Jasmine Dustin as Nadine, Wing Woman
- Lisa Jay as Scarlet, Wing Woman
- Cristina Rosato as Francine, Social Proof
- Ashleigh Harrington as Anna, Dancer
- Adele Jones as Fiona

== Development ==
The film was cast in Los Angeles and Quebec in 2008. The script was written by the director and producer Amit Gupta, and after a year of writing the script, the film started production in early 2008. Filming was done in 2008 and picked up again in February 2010 to finish last scenes needed by the distribution company. Filming was done in Los Angeles, Las Vegas, Montreal, and Philadelphia. International release was in April 2010. U.S. and Canada release is expected in 2011.
