= The Jacket =

2005 film by John Maybury

- Theatrical release poster
- Directed by: John Maybury
- Screenplay by: Massy Tadjedin
- Story by: Tom Bleecker; Marc Rocco
- Produced by: George Clooney; Peter Guber; Steven Soderbergh; Marc Rocco
- Starring: Adrien Brody; Keira Knightley; Kris Kristofferson; Jennifer Jason Leigh; Kelly Lynch; Brad Renfro; Daniel Craig
- Cinematography: Peter Deming
- Edited by: Emma E. Hickox
- Music by: Brian Eno
- Production companies: Mandalay Pictures; 2929 Entertainment; Section Eight
- Distributed by: Warner Independent Pictures (United States); Summit Entertainment (International)
- Release dates: January 23, 2005 (Sundance); March 4, 2005 (United States)
- Running time: 103 minutes
- Country: United States
- Language: English
- Budget: $28.5 million
- Box office: $21.1 million

The Jacket is a 2005 American science-fiction psychological thriller film directed by John Maybury and starring Adrien Brody, Keira Knightley, Kris Kristofferson, and Jennifer Jason Leigh. It is partly based on the 1915 Jack London novel The Star Rover, published in the United Kingdom as The Jacket. Massy Tadjedin wrote the screenplay based on a story by Tom Bleecker and Marc Rocco. The original music score is composed by Brian Eno and the cinematography is by Peter Deming.

The Jacket premiered at the 2005 Sundance Film Festival, and was released in theaters in the United States by Warner Independent Pictures on March 4, 2005. It grossed $21.1 million on a budget of $28.5 million and received mixed reviews from critics.

== Plot ==
After miraculously recovering from an apparently fatal bullet wound to the head inflicted by a child soldier, Gulf War veteran Jack Starks returns to Vermont in 1992, suffering from periods of amnesia. While walking, he sees a young girl, Jackie, and her alcoholic mother in despair beside their broken-down truck. Starks and Jackie quickly form a bond; she asks him to give her his dog tags, which he does. He gets the truck started and continues on his way. Shortly after, a man driving along the same highway gives Jack a ride and they get pulled over by a policeman.

Soon after, Starks is found lying on the deserted roadside near the dead policeman, with a slug from the policeman's gun in his body and the murder weapon nearby. He testifies that someone else was at the scene, but is not believed because of his amnesia, is found not guilty by reason of insanity and incarcerated in a mental institution.

Starks is placed in the unsympathetic care of Dr. Thomas Becker, a psychiatrist, and his more humane colleague Dr. Beth Lorenson. In December 1992, Starks is forced to undergo an unauthorized treatment designed by Becker: he is injected with experimental drugs, bound in a straitjacket and placed inside a morgue drawer as a form of sensory deprivation. While in this condition, he is able to travel 15 years into the future and stay there for a short time. He meets an older version of Jackie at a roadside diner where she works. She does not recognize him, but takes pity on him and offers him shelter for the night. While in her apartment, Starks comes across his own dog tags and confronts her. Jackie, frightened, tells him that he can't be Jack Starks, as he died on New Year's Day in 1993, and asks him to leave. Subsequently, Starks is transported back to the future on several occasions in the course of his treatment and, after earning Jackie's trust, they try to figure out how to make use of the time-traveling so as to remove Jack from the hospital and save his life.

A sub-plot involves Dr. Lorensen informally treating a friend's son played, significantly, by the same actor as the child soldier. Risking her career, Lorensen eventually cures the child with a single, unsanctioned application of ECT.

Early on January 1, 1993, knowing that his time is running out, Starks is briefly taken out of the hospital by Lorenson, whom he has finally convinced of his time travel experiences and knowledge of future events. She drives Starks to the childhood home of Jackie and her mother, where he gives the mother a letter he has written, which outlines Jackie's bleak future and warns the mother that she is fated to orphan Jackie when she dies after falling asleep with a lit cigarette in her hand. When he returns to the hospital, Starks experiences a flashback to the head wound he suffered in Iraq, simultaneously slipping on the ice and hitting his head. Bleeding profusely, he convinces two of the more sympathetic doctors to put him into the jacket one last time.

Starks returns to 2007, where he finds that his letter to Jackie's mother has made all the difference. Jackie now has a better life than in the previous version of 2007. She is no longer a waitress, is dressed in a nurse's uniform, and has a noticeably more cheerful outlook. They reprise their first 2007 meeting: she sees Starks standing in the snow and initially drives past him, but backs up when she notices his head wound. She stops and offers to take him to the hospital where she works. While they are in the car, Jackie receives a call from her mother, still alive and well. They drive on, the screen fades to white and we hear Jackie's voice ask, "How much time do we have?", which she has asked him before. As the credits roll, the answer to the question is given by the words of the song "We Have All the Time in the World" sung by Iggy Pop.

== Cast ==
- Adrien Brody as Jack Starks
- Keira Knightley as Jackie Price
  - Laura Marano as Young Jackie Price
- Kris Kristofferson as Dr. Thomas Becker
- Jennifer Jason Leigh as Dr. Beth Lorenson
- Kelly Lynch as Jean Price
- Brad Renfro as The Stranger
- Daniel Craig as Rudy Mackenzie
- Steven Mackintosh as Dr. Hopkins
- Brendan Coyle as Damon
- Mackenzie Phillips as Nurse Hardling
- Jason Lewis as Officer Harrison
- Richard Dillane as Captain Medley
- Jonah Lotan and Angel Coulby as Interns
- Paul Birchard as Doctor
- Nigel Whitmey as Lieutenant
- Ian Porter as Major
- Anthony Edridge as Dr. Morgan
- Kerry Shale as Prosecutor
- Angus MacInnes as Judge
- Richard Durden as Dr. Hale
- Tristan Gemmill as Officer Nash
- Colin Stinton as Jury Foreman
- Tara Summers as Nurse Nina
- Angelo Andreou as Babak and Iraqi Boy
- Teresa Gallagher as Nurse Sally
- Anne Kidd as State Representative
- Charneh Demir as Jamite
- Frances Brady-Stewart as Woman With Dog
- Lolly Susi as Nurse
- Garrick Hagon as Defense Lawyer
- Fish as Jimmy Fleisher

== Production ==
In September 1998, one of the projects on Mandalay Pictures' development slate included The Jacket to be directed by Marc Rocco. In June 2000, George Clooney and Steven Soderbergh came on board to produce The Jacket through Section Eight Productions. The initial draft of The Jacket followed a Vietnam veteran who following his return to the United States is framed for murder and sent to a prison farm where he learns from another inmate the ability to mentally travel into the future which becomes a tool find the one who framed him. In May 2002, it was reported that Massy Tadjedin had provided rewrites for the film. In September of that year, it was reported Antoine Fuqua was in negotiations to direct with Paramount Pictures distributing. By April 2003, John Maybury was in talks to direct with Mark Wahlberg to potentially play the lead. By August of that year, Wahlberg and Paramount had left the project with Adrien Brody assuming the lead role for the film which would be one of the first releases of Warner Independent Pictures. By this point in the production the script had abandoned the plot thread of the main character's false conviction for murder and clearing his name and was switched from taking place at a prison farm to a psychiatric hospital.

== Background ==
The Jacket shares its title, and the idea of a person experiencing extra-corporeal time-travel while in an intolerably tight straitjacket, with a 1915 novel by Jack London. The novel was published in the United Kingdom as The Jacket and in the United States of America as The Star Rover. Director Maybury has said that the film is "loosely based on a true story that became a Jack London story". The true story is that of Ed Morrell, who told London about San Quentin prison's inhumane use of tight straitjackets.

== Reception ==
=== Box office ===
The Jacket opened on March 4, 2005, and grossed $2,723,682 (~$4.19 million in 2024) on opening weekend, with a peak release of 1,331 theaters in the United States. The film went on to gross $6,303,762 domestically, for a total of $21,126,225 worldwide.

=== Critical response ===
On the review aggregator website Rotten Tomatoes, 44% of 162 critics' reviews are positive, with an average rating of 5.4/10. The website's consensus reads: "The Jacket is a case of creepy style over substance." On Metacritic, it had a score of 44% based on reviews from 35 critics, indicating "mixed or average reviews".

Roger Ebert of the Chicago Sun-Times gave it two out of four stars and wrote: "You can sense an impulse toward a better film, and Adrien Brody and Keira Knightley certainly take it seriously, but the time-travel whiplash effect sets in, and it becomes, as so many time travel movies do, an exercise in early entrances, late exits, futile regrets."

== See also ==
- La Jetée, a 1962 French science fiction featurette in which sensory deprivation and strong memories lead to time travel
