= Beautiful Boy (2010 film) =

- Directed by: Shawn Ku
- Written by: Michael Armbruster; Shawn Ku
- Produced by: Lee Clay; Eric Gozlan
- Starring: Michael Sheen; Maria Bello; Alan Tudyk; Moon Bloodgood; Kyle Gallner
- Cinematography: Michael Fimognari
- Edited by: Chad Galster
- Music by: Trevor Morris
- Distributed by: Anchor Bay Entertainment
- Release dates: September 2010 (San Sebastián); June 3, 2011 (United States)
- Running time: 100 minutes
- Country: United States
- Language: English
- Box office: $140,123

Beautiful Boy is a 2010 American drama film directed by Shawn Ku and written by Ku and Michael Armbruster. The film stars Michael Sheen and Maria Bello as Bill and Kate Carroll, a married couple whose lives unravel after their 18-year-old son Sam (played by Kyle Gallner) dies in a school shooting and is identified as the perpetrator. The supporting cast includes Alan Tudyk, Moon Bloodgood, Austin Nichols, Meat Loaf and Myra Turley.

Beautiful Boy was released in the United States on June 3, 2011, by Anchor Bay Entertainment. The film grossed $140,123 in its limited theatrical run. Critical reception was mixed to positive: reviewers widely praised Sheen and Bello’s performances, while some criticized the film’s storytelling and approach to its subject matter. At the 2010 Toronto International Film Festival, it won the Prize of the International Critics (FIPRESCI) for the Discovery program.

== Plot ==
The film opens with home-video footage of Bill and Kate at the beach with their young son, Sam. In the present day, a young man reads a short story to a small group about a boy and girl whose lives will be irrevocably changed, but his audience barely listens. Bill and Kate are introduced as a married couple who are rigid, career-focused, and emotionally distant. Bill works as a businessman, while Kate makes a living proofreading books. Their relationship is largely held together by Sam, now 18, who is struggling to adjust to college.

One morning, news reports describe a shooting spree at Sam’s school. Police soon arrive at Bill and Kate’s home and confirm that Sam is dead—and that he was the gunman. Kate refuses to accept the accusation and compulsively cleans and restores Sam’s bedroom after it has been searched. As reporters and onlookers converge on the house, Bill and Kate flee to stay with Kate’s brother, Eric, and his wife, Trish. There, Eric and Trish’s son Dylan sees a video message from Sam connected to the massacre, deepening the family’s shock. Bill decides to make a public statement expressing sorrow for what happened and pleading for privacy as they try to continue living. A small, private funeral is held with only family present.

Tensions build in Eric and Trish’s home. Trish grows frustrated with Kate’s controlling habits and her attempts to “mother” Dylan, while Eric urges patience, noting that Sam was Kate’s only child. Bill and Kate leave and check into a motel, where a quiet night together briefly suggests intimacy and reconciliation. The fragile calm is disrupted when Bill returns to their house and finds a teenage boy rifling through Sam’s belongings. A scuffle breaks out, Bill cuts his hand, and the intruder insults him before fleeing. Bill takes their laptop back to the motel, where he and Kate discover a message from Sam: a short video in which he apologizes and asks his parents not to hate him.

Bill and Kate’s grief turns outward into blame. Bill argues that Kate’s relentless criticism may have contributed to Sam’s anger, while Kate accuses Bill of being absent and prioritizing work over family. Their fight culminates in Bill shouting that he wishes Sam had never been born, prompting Kate to leave and return to the house alone. Bill meets his boss, Harry, who reluctantly agrees to let him resume work the following week. Meanwhile, Kate encounters a younger co-worker, Cooper, and brings him back to the house after they eat together. She soon realizes Cooper has been secretly researching Sam and going through his writing for an article meant to “humanize” him; disturbed and hurt, she orders him to leave.

Bill returns to work but finds his colleagues staring and avoiding him. After he confronts them, Harry suggests Bill take more time off and see a therapist; Bill reacts angrily and quits. Later, Bill visits Sam’s grave and finds it vandalized with the word killer. He breaks down while trying to scrub it clean with his injured hand. A call from the motel manager leads Kate to Bill, who is withdrawn and despondent. She brings him home and comforts him as they confront their shared devastation. The film closes with Sam’s voice returning to the short story, underscoring that, whatever Bill and Kate do next, their lives will never be the same.

== Cast ==
- Michael Sheen as Bill Carroll
- Maria Bello as Kate Carroll
- Alan Tudyk as Eric
- Moon Bloodgood as Trish
- Kyle Gallner as Sam Carroll
  - Logan South as young Sam Carroll
- Meat Loaf as the motel manager
- Bruce French as Harry
- Austin Nichols as Cooper
- Gregory Alpert as Baby Shower Carl, Web Reporter Voice
- Deidrie Henry as Bonnie
- Kelli Kirkland as TV News Reporter (as Kelli Kirkland Powers)
- David Lipper as Radio Reporter Voice, Television Ranter
- Nigel Gibbs as Detective
- Brooke Lyons as TV Reporter Voice
- Michael Call as TV Reporter Voice
- Cody Wai-Ho Lee as Dylan
- Jessie Usher as Basketball Teen
- Darren O'Hare as Church Pastor
- Myra Turley as Grieving Mother Patty

== Production ==
Filmmaker Shawn Ku first conceived of the film as being about a married couple in a strained relationship, but decided to add in the school shooting element and focus on the parents of the perpetrator as that particular scenario had not been depicted on screen before. Of his preparations for the script, Ku said, "So often the parents in a situation like this just completely disappear from the discussion. They’re forced into hiding. So it’s hard to do research about what it’s like to go through such a horrific tragedy. You don’t even have a home to hide in. So [co-writer Michael Armbruster and I] just wanted to shed some light, our light on these two people who’ve been both ignored within and blamed for these terrible tragedies."

== Critical reception ==
The performances of Bello and Sheen were roundly praised, but critics found fault with the storytelling. Stephen Holden of The New York Times wrote the film is "so high-mindedly determined to avoid sensationalism that it sidesteps critical dramatic content and sabotages its own ambitions". Ann Hornaday of The Washington Post commented, "As accomplished as Bello and Sheen are in underplaying their characters’ extreme emotions, Beautiful Boy begins to feel less like a taut character study and more like a maudlin melodrama. Its weaknesses are only heightened by inevitable comparisons with recent, much better movies that touched on the similar themes, especially last year’s Blue Valentine and Rabbit Hole."

Critic Roger Ebert awarded the film 3 out of 4 stars. He wrote, "A film like this can end honestly in only one way, and Ku is true to it. Life will go on, one baffling day after another. There can be no release, only a gradual deadening. So it must be with most parents of children who commit horrible deeds. People do things for which there are no reasons, and if they don't kill themselves, they must live…in the debris of their madness."

On the review aggregator website Rotten Tomatoes, 71% of 66 critics' reviews are positive, with an average rating of 6.1/10. The website's consensus reads: "Saved by a pair of outstanding performances, Beautiful Boy is a testament to parental love and understating in the face of ultimate sorrow." Metacritic, which uses a weighted average, assigned the film a score of 62 out of 100, based on 25 critics, indicating "generally favorable" reviews.

=== Accolades ===
At the 2010 Toronto International Film Festival, the film won the Prize of the International Critics (FIPRESCI) for the Discovery program.

== Soundtrack ==
In 2016, Beautiful Boy (Original Motion Picture Score) by Trevor Morris was released.
