= On the Way to the Sea =

2010 Canadian film

- Film poster
- Directed by: Tao Gu
- Produced by: Aonan Yang
- Starring: Yungen Li; Chuanshu Gu
- Music by: Delphine Measroch
- Production company: GreenGround Productions
- Release date: September 2010 (TIFF)
- Running time: 19 minutes
- Country: Canada
- Language: Chinese

On the Way to the Sea is a Canadian short documentary film, directed by Tao Gu and released in 2010. The film centres on the director's trip to his childhood home in Wenchuan County, China, following the 2008 Sichuan earthquake.

The film was made as Gu's thesis project for the film studies program at the Mel Hoppenheim School of Cinema.

The film premiered at the 2010 Toronto International Film Festival. It was subsequently named to TIFF's year-end Canada's Top Ten list for 2010.
