= The High Cost of Living =

- Theatrical release poster
- Directed by: Deborah Chow
- Written by: Deborah Chow
- Produced by: Kim Berlin; Susan Schneir
- Starring: Zach Braff; Isabelle Blais; Patrick Labbé
- Cinematography: Claudine Sauvé
- Edited by: Jonathan Alberts; Benjamin Duffield
- Music by: Normand Corbeil
- Production company: Suki Films
- Distributed by: Tribeca Film
- Release dates: 15 September 2010 (Toronto); 22 April 2011
- Running time: 92 minutes
- Country: Canada
- Languages: English; French

The High Cost of Living is a 2010 Canadian drama film starring Zach Braff, Isabelle Blais and Patrick Labbé. Written and directed by Deborah Chow and set in Montreal, the film centers on a young, pregnant woman who is befriended by a drug dealer, as both struggle to cope with loss, guilt, and the consequences of their choices.

The film made its debut at the 2010 Toronto International Film Festival, and was released theatrically in April 2011. It won TIFF's award for Best Canadian First Feature Film.

== Plot ==
Nathalie watches her life unravel after her near-term fetus is killed due to a hit and run accident, leaving her to wait the remaining weeks until her child will be stillborn. She finds an unlikely protector in Henry, a down and out guardian angel who has followed her thread. But Henry is not quite an angel, and she struggles to come to terms with the loss. Nathalie begins to rely on Henry, and even begins to love him. It becomes clear to Nathalie that he is a drug dealer, and she accepts this but tells him he should change his ways. Later, as Nathalie and the police are trying to find the man that hit her, it is revealed to be Henry. He then goes to her telling he will turn himself in because that is all he can give her since she cannot forgive him. To prove that he will he calls the detective and leaves his number. Earlier in the movie she asked him if he would accompany her when she gives birth to her stillborn, in the end he still goes. After the OR doors shut on him, the police return his call.

== Cast ==
- Zach Braff as Henry Welles
- Isabelle Blais as Nathalie
- Patrick Labbé as Michael

== Reception ==
On Rotten Tomatoes, the film has an approval rating of 53%, based on reviews from 15 critics, with an average rating of 5.5/10. On Metacritic, the film has a weighted average score of 49 out of 100, based on 6 critics, indicating "mixed or average reviews".

The New York Times wrote: This film bears all the hallmarks of a conventional indie drama: "a downbeat scenario, flawed protagonists, and a strongly regional inflection." Chow is credited on hitting every mark and narrative turning point. The result is a strange dramatic complexity, with a work of superficial depth.
