= The Legend of Beaver Dam =

2010 Canadian film

- Film poster
- Directed by: Jerome Sable
- Written by: Jerome Sable; Eli Batalion
- Produced by: Eli Batalion; Jerome Sable; Michael R. Blaha
- Starring: L. J. Benet; Seán Cullen; Rick Miller
- Cinematography: Matt Egan
- Edited by: Nicholas Musurca
- Music by: Eli Batalion; Jerome Sable
- Distributed by: Ouat Media
- Release date: September 9, 2010 (TIFF)
- Running time: 12 minutes
- Country: Canada
- Language: English

The Legend of Beaver Dam is a Canadian musical comedy horror short film, directed by Jerome Sable and released in 2010. The film stars L. J. Benet as Danny Zigwitz, a nerdy young boy at summer camp who is called on to save his friends when the camp counsellor's (Seán Cullen) campfire song about a monster named Stumpy Sam awakens the eponymous bloodthirsty beast (Rick Miller).

The film premiered at the 2010 Toronto International Film Festival, and was named to TIFF's year-end Canada's Top Ten list for 2010. It was subsequently screened at the 2011 Sundance Film Festival, where it received an honorable mention in the short films category.
