= The Girls on Film =

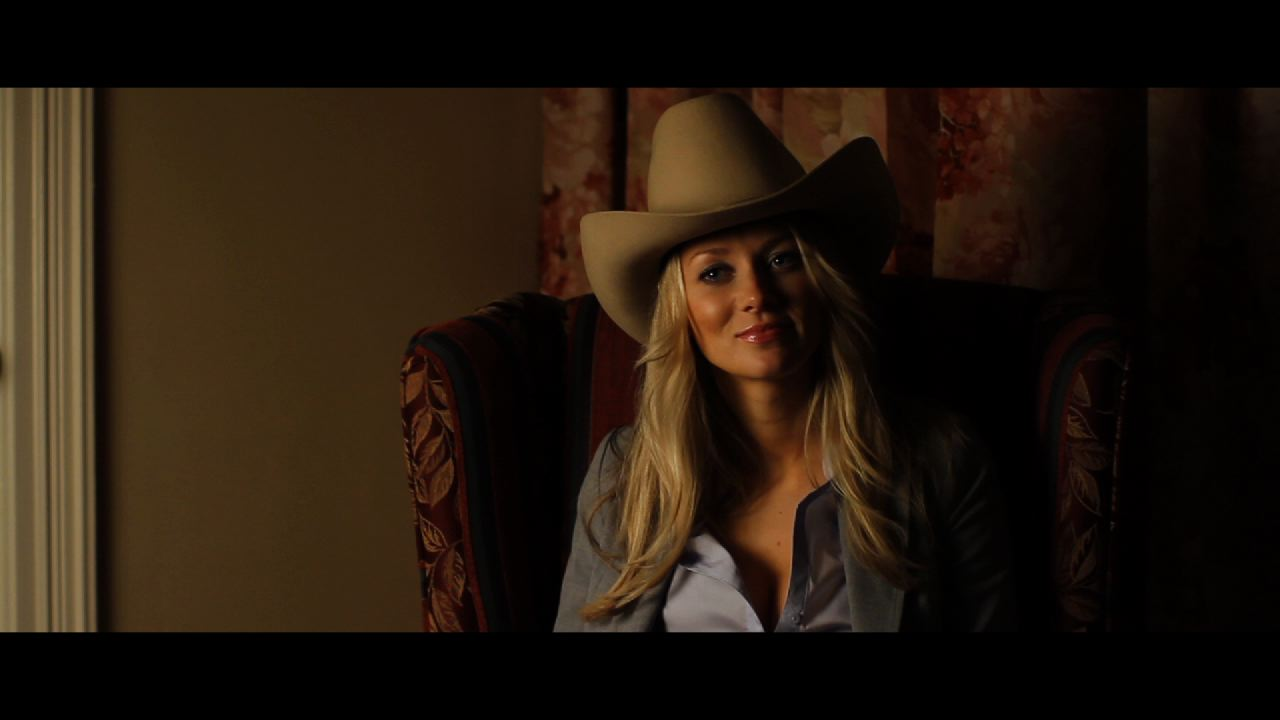
- Ashleigh Harrington on the set of The Girls on Film
- Genre: Drama; Thriller; Action
- Created by: Ashleigh Harrington; Jeff Hammond; Cat McCormick
- Directed by: Jeff Hammond
- Starring: Ashleigh Harrington
- Country of origin: Canada
- Original language: English
- No. of seasons: 1
- No. of episodes: 6

Production
- Executive producers: Jeff Hammond; Ashleigh Harrington
- Production location: Toronto
- Cinematography: Jeff Hammond
- Editor: Ashleigh Harrington
- Running time: 3–7 minutes
- Production company: Hammond Cheeze Films

Original release
- Network: YouTube
- Release: 20 December 2010

The Girls on Film is a web series created by Jeff Hammond, Ashleigh Harrington and Cat McCormick, directed by Hammond, and starring Harrington and a variety of guest stars. It premiered on YouTube on 20 December 2010. Each episode is around three to seven minutes long. The project recreates movie scenes originally played by men, with women taking the starring roles. The Girls on Film is listed as one of the top websites for Film Geeks in Leslie Simon's book, Geek Girls Unite: Why Fangirls, Bookworms, Indie Chicks, and Other Misfits Will Inherit the Earth.
