= Edward Morrell =

American writer, activist and convicted criminal

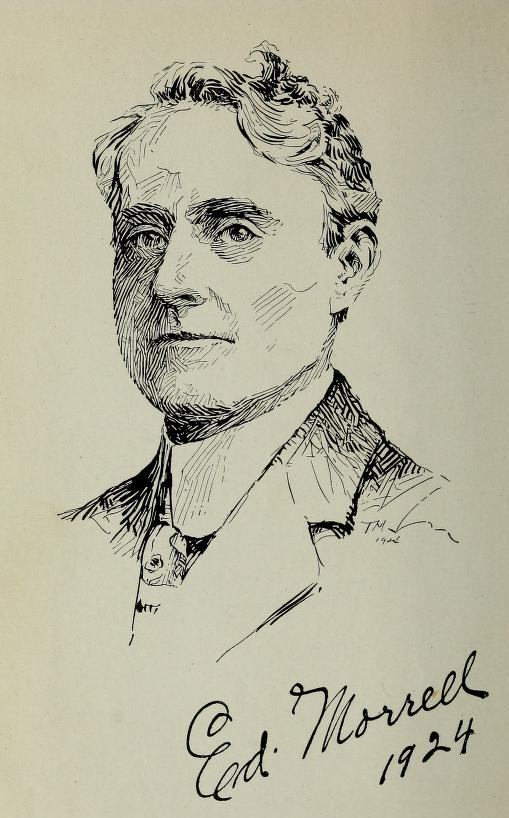
Ed Morrell

Edward H. Morrell (October 21, 1868 – November 10, 1946) was an American convict, activist, and writer.

== Biography ==
Morrell was an American prisoner who became known for withstanding cruelty and torture. He was an accomplice to the Evans and Sontag gang that robbed the Southern Pacific Railroad in California's San Joaquin Valley in the 1890s. According to his memoir, "The 25th Man", the robberies were after revenge for the large railroad corporation's mistreatment of local ranchers in the San Joaquin Valley. Morrell was sentenced to life imprisonment in Folsom State Prison in 1894. He was eventually transferred to San Quentin (1899 at the latest) and pardoned in 1908. Five of his years were spent in solitary confinement; he was known as the Dungeon Man of San Quentin. Author Jack London championed his pardon and Morrell became a frequent guest at London's Beauty Ranch in Glen Ellen, California. London used Morrell as a character in his 1915 novel The Star Rover.

Morrell had been subjected to severe physical abuse in prison. After his release, he lectured widely on his experiences and advocated prison reform. He lectured with former San Quentin prisoner and author Donald Lowrie. Morrell's lectures included addresses to the California and Pennsylvania legislatures. He advocated the abolition of corporal punishment. In 1914, he wrote a one-act play, The Incorrigible, based on his experiences (and one of his nicknames). In 1924, he published his memoirs, The 25th Man: The Strange Story of Ed. Morrell, the Hero of Jack London's Star Rover.

Morrell was born in Thomaston, Pennsylvania on October 22, 1868. He came to California in 1891. "In his later years, he was a colorful habitue of Gower Gulch and a frequenter of Hollywood and Vine, the crony and pet of Hollywood film people." He died, age 78, in Los Angeles on November 10, 1946.

== Selected publications ==
- The Twenty-Fifth Man (1925)

== See also ==
- Battle of Stone Corral
