= Chriselle Almeida =

Indian actress

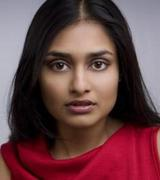
- Born: Mumbai, India
- Occupation: Actress
- Website: www.chrisellealmeida.com

Chriselle Almeida is an Indian actress.

== Education ==
Almeida received a Bachelor of Fine Arts in Acting from the University of Connecticut-Storrs and received a full scholarship towards her Master of Fine Arts in Acting from University of California, Los Angeles however she never completed her degree and left after only 1 year.

== Career ==
Almeida's film career includes her starring role as Kiran, a Bollywood star who has an affair with a female journalist in When Kiran Met Karen, which caused some controversy in India. She also starred as India in the 2004 film The Franklin Abraham, directed by Jonah Freeman, and played Bindu Kapoor in the 2016 film Miss India America, directed by Ravi Kapoor. She has also been nominated for Best Lead Actress at the Idyllwild Film Festival for a short film.

In television, she appeared as Lakshmi, a prospective bride for Raj Koothrappali in The Big Bang Theory episode "The Transporter Malfunction". Other credits include Arrested Development, Cavemen, Grey's Anatomy, Melissa & Joey, Showtime's Shameless, and Gossip Girl, as well as Sex and the City 2, Body of Proof, and Loosely Exactly Nicole.

On stage, Almeida has performed with Rasa Theater, a professional South Asian company in New York City, including in the Eugene O'Neill play Abortion and the Sarovar Banka play The End of the Apurnas.
