= Jeff Hammond (actor) =

Canadian actor and director (born 1980)

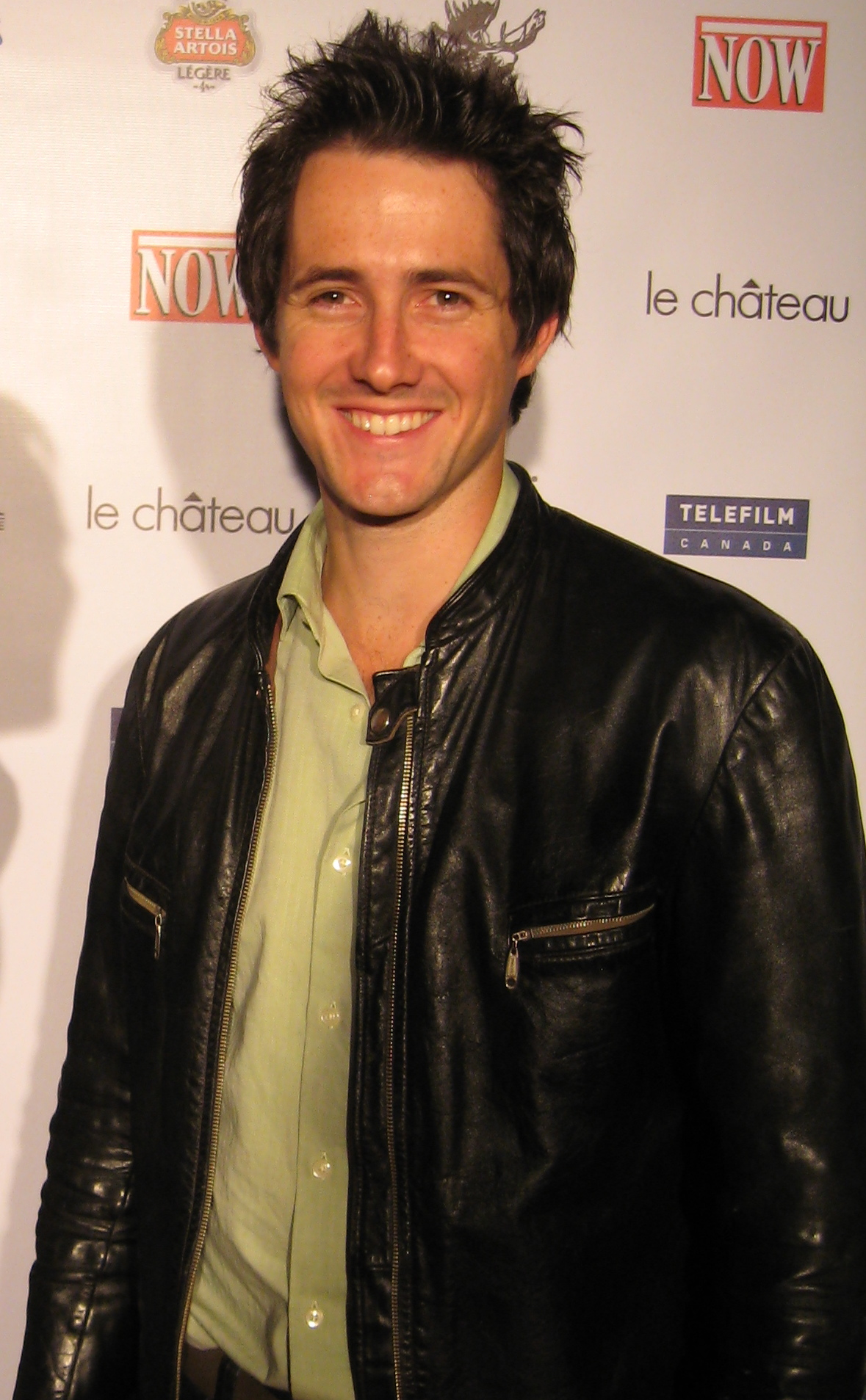
- Born: Jeffrey Robert Hammond; Leamington, Ontario, Canada
- Occupations: Actor, Director
- Years active: 2007–present

Jeffrey Robert Hammond (born March 12, 1980) is a Canadian actor and director. He acted in Breakout Kings (2011) and Black Friday (2009). He also acted in and directed segments for the project The Girls on Film (2010).

== Filmography ==
Film credits
Year	Film	Role	Notes
2010	Above the Knee	Man with Barrette	
2009	Black Friday	Jeff	
2008	Running on Empty	actor	

Television credits
Year	Show	Role	Notes
2011	Breakout Kings	Male Nurse	1 episode
2010	The Girls on Film	Claire Keesey	1 episode

Film and television director
Year	Film	Notes
2010	The Girls on Film	TV series. Also producer and actor
2009	Black Friday	Short film. Also writer, cinematographer, editor and producer
2008	Running on Empty	Short film. Also writer, cinematographer, editor and actor
2007	Bobbing for Apples	Short film. Also writer, cinematographer, editor and producer
