= Last Night (soundtrack) =

Soundtrack album by Clint Mansell
- Released: September 6, 2011
- Recorded: 2009–2010
- Genre: Feature film soundtrack
- Length: 26:09
- Label: Milan Records; Warner Classics
- Producer: Clint Mansell

Clint Mansell chronology
Black Swan (2010)	Last Night (2011)	Stoker (2013)

Last Night (Original Motion Picture Soundtrack) is the soundtrack to the 2011 film Last Night featuring music composed and produced by Clint Mansell. The album was not made available before its initial United States release, and instead it was published on September 6, 2011 by Milan Records and Warner Classics through audio CD and digital download. Critics praised to the soundtrack, and Mansell was nominated for a World Soundtrack Award for Soundtrack Composer of the Year. The nomination was also for his music for the 2010 films Black Swan and Faster.

== Background ==
Mansell used piano for most of the film, which he felt that it had a "sort of hypnotic" sound on the tracks. The score featured vocals provided by Peter Broderick, who also wrote lyrics for few songs and also re-recorded his song "Not At Home" with Mansell at the climatic scene, after Tadjedin's request. Writing for Uncut, David Quantick described the music as "a step outside [of Mansell's] usual mixture of intense orchestral post-rock and intense moodiness"; according to Thomson the soundtrack is composed primarily of "melancholy piano pieces".

== Reception ==
Cynthia Ellis of HuffPost wrote Mansell created "a haunting score" that "lingers long after the film is over". Quantick from Uncut praised the soundtrack as "a slight collection, but excellent for all that", although Rodrigo Perez of IndieWire criticized it as "mostly played out in the forgettable background". Brice Ezell, writing for PopMatters described it as "Don’t let the album’s relatively short length fool you: this is incredible, powerful music that runs through a whole range of emotions over the course of its runtime. Mansell wastes no time in this score’s seven track length, making a powerfully emotive case for his status as the best film composer alive." Stephen Cole of The Globe and Mail commented that Mansell "offers up an austere piano concerto".

== Track listing ==
Track list
No.	Title	Composer	Length
1.	"First Movement"	Clint Mansell	7:04
2.	"Pillow Talking"	Clint Mansell	3:31
3.	"Streets of New York"	Clint Mansell	2:49
4.	"Emotional Connections"	Clint Mansell	2:53
5.	"Dangerous Territory"	Clint Mansell	1:55
6.	"Physical Liaison"	Clint Mansell	2:51
7.	"Final Movement"	Clint Mansell	5:06
Total length:			26:09

== Credits ==
Credits adapted from CD liner notes.

- Peter Broderick – lyricist, vocals
- Jean-Christophe Chamboredon – soundtrack executive producer
- Geoff Foster – engineer, mixing, producer
- Vanessa Freebairn-Smith – cello
- Stefan Karrer – soundtrack executive producer
- Randy Kerber – piano
- Shawn Lyon – graphic design
- Clint Mansell – bass, composer, guitar, primary Artist, producer
- Roya Melamed – legal advisor
- Ray Staff – mastering
- Massy Tadjedin – liner notes
- Nigel Wiesehan – assistant producer
