= Shawn Ku =

American film director

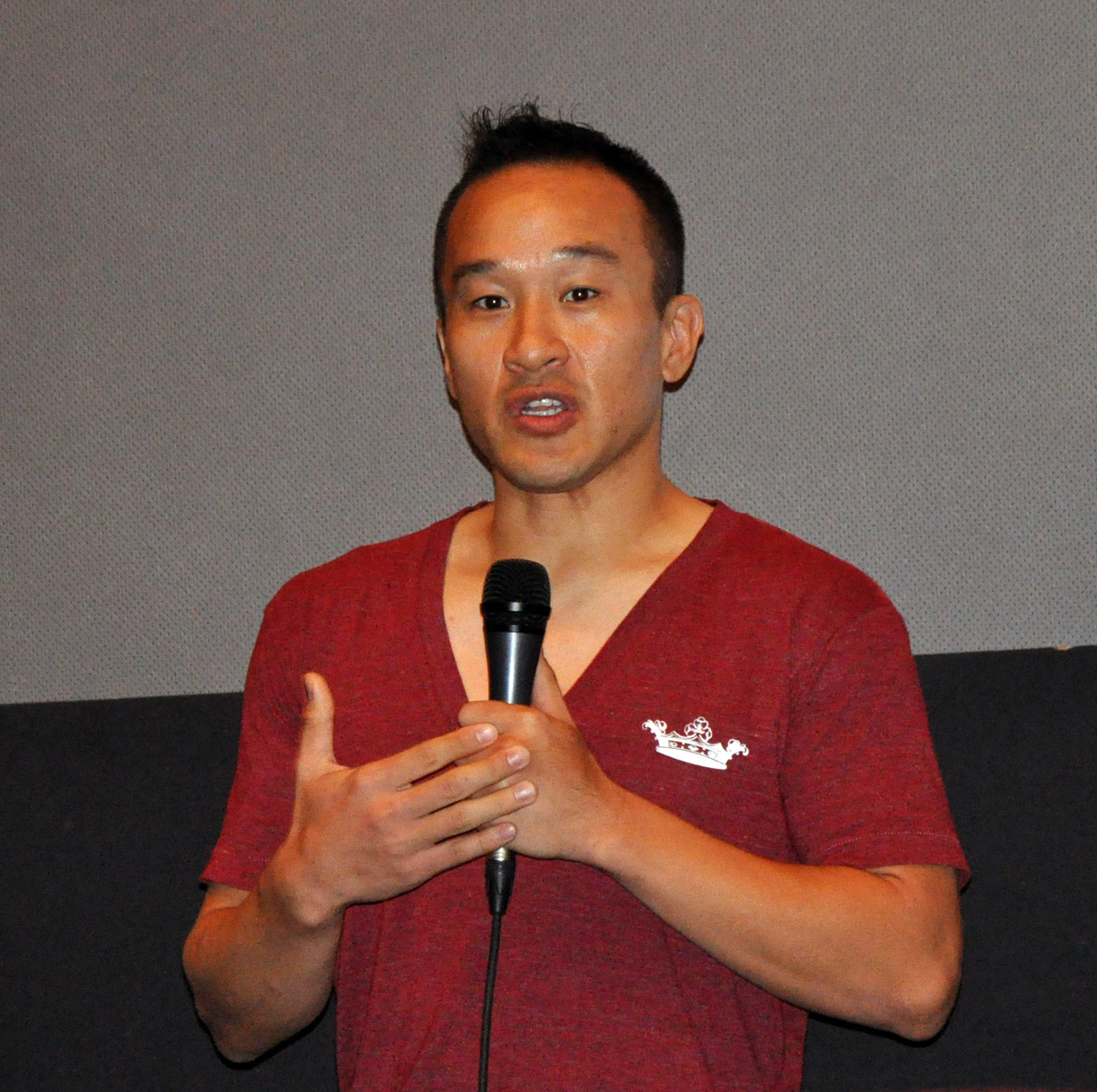
- Ku at the screening of Beautiful Boy at the 2010 Toronto International Film Festival
- Born: New York City, U.S.
- Years active: 2001-present

Shawn Ku is a U.S. choreographer and motion picture director. He has also danced on Broadway, and acted in an independent feature-length film. Inspired by his family's personal connection to the Virginia Tech shooting and unexpected death of a visiting friend, Shawn Ku developed his 2010 film Beautiful Boy from those experiences.

== Personal life ==
Ku went to Harvard University as a chemistry pre-medical major and was accepted to Columbia medical school, before beginning his entertainment career.

== Credits ==
- Samsara (2001) - actor
- Making Tracks (2002) - choreographer
- Pretty Dead Girl (2004) - writer, director
- The American Mall (2008) - choreographer, director
- Beautiful Boy (2010) - writer, director
- A Score to Settle (2019) - director
