= Dan Rush =

American union founder and director

- Born: Daniel James Rush; August 22, 1960 (age 66); Oakland, California
- Occupations: Founder and National Director, United Food and Commercial Workers, Medical Cannabis and Hemp Division
- Known for: Cannabis activism, criminal conviction for bribery

Dan Rush is an American former union organizer and former statewide political and special operations director of the United Food and Commercial Workers for cannabis and hemp workers. He was known for being a leader in the United States Labor movement in politics and for cannabis and hemp industry workers, and a civil and motorcycle rights activist. Rush began his career in the union in the 1980s as a senior official responsible for carrying out statewide ballot industry politics and eventually founded the concept of organizing medical cannabis and hemp workers in the United States and Canada. He was later investigated by the Federal Bureau of Investigation for enriching himself at the expense of his union in 2015, and for cheating his clients by betraying them for bribes from other cannabis industry stakeholders. He took a plea bargain in 2017, pled guilty to three charges, and served a multiyear sentence in federal prison.

== Career ==
He was born in Oakland, California. He was a union organizer. Rush was hired to work on various projects for the UFCW Local 5. In 2012, he was national director of the Medical Cannabis and Hemp Division of the United Food and Commercial Workers union. He was hired by the UFCW International Union in 2014 to head up their cannabis division as Organizing Coordinator. In 2017 he testified that he never graduated from high school.

== Federal prosecution ==
Multiple cannabis dispensary entrepreneurs went to the United States Federal Bureau of Investigation, or responded to FBI corruption inquiries, after feeling cheated or betrayed by Rush. This produced a Federal investigation called Operation Limelight. Rush was investigated on corruption charges for using his influence to favor Oakland cannabis businesses in return for paying off a $420,000 loan on Rush's personal house with a shopping bag full of cash. The "sordid details of his indictment" in August 2015 led the national union to immediately fire him.

Rush was originally scheduled to go to trial in 2017. However, on June 20, 2017, Rush pled guilty to two charges of betraying his union for a bribe from an employer, and a third charge of structuring a $500,000 cash deposit to avoid banks reporting it. He was sentenced to 37 months in prison. San Francisco Chronicle reporter Jason Fagone interviewed Rush in prison in 2018. On March 24, 2020, Rush was transferred from federal prison to a halfway house in San Francisco.
