= The Place in Between =

- Film poster
- Directed by: Sarah Bouyain
- Screenplay by: Sarah Bouyain, Gaëlle Macé
- Produced by: Athénaïse, Abissia Productions
- Starring: Dorylia Calmel, Assita Ouédraogo, Nathalie Richard, Blandine Yaméogo, Nadine Kambou Yéri
- Cinematography: Nicolas Gaurin
- Edited by: Valérie Loiseleux, Pascale Chavance
- Music by: Sylvain Chauveau
- Release date: 3 September 2010
- Running time: 82 minutes
- Countries: Burkina Faso; France

The Place in Between (French: Notre Étrangère) is a 2010 Burkinabé drama film about a biracial Frenchwoman learning about her mother.

== Synopsis ==
After the death of her father, Amy, a young biracial woman, leaves Paris to go to Bobo-Dioulasso in Burkina Faso to find her mother from whom she grew up without. But Amy arrives to find that only her aunt Acita (Yaméogo) lives in her childhood home. She also learns from her aunt that her mother had done something that had greatly shamed the family.

Amy goes from one part of the family to another; although comforting, it is also stifling. Moreover, she encounters a city in which she no longer has a point of reference. Amy feels adrift in this foreign city that she doesn't hardly remember.

Meanwhile in Paris, Mariam, a 45-year-old Burkinabe, is an office cleaner that lives in Paris trying to find her daughter. She had just recently met Ester, the manager of the company where she cleans. While Ester learns the Dyula language from Mariam for unknown reasons, the two lonely women gradually grow to appreciate each other.

== Cast ==
Amy - Dorylia Calmel

Mariam - Assita Ouedraogo

Acita (Amy's aunt) - Blandine Yaméogo

Ester - Nathalie Richard

Kadiatou - Nadine Kambou Yéri

Elliot - Jérôme Sénélas

Awa - Djénéba Koné

Marie - Dominique Reymond

== Release dates ==
The following is a list of the release dates for The Place in Between around the world:

Belgium - September 3, 2010

Canada - September 10, 2010; April 13, 2011

Greece - December 8, 2010

France - February 2, 2011; November 19, 2011

United States - April 22, 11

== Awards ==
- Amiens 2010
- Fespaco 2011
