= Sarah Bouyain =

French-Burkinabé writer and film director

Sarah Bouyain (born 1968) is a French-Burkinabé writer and film director. Her first full-length film, The Place in Between, was released in 2010.

== Biography ==
Bouyain was born in Reims, Marne, France. Her mother, who was French, and her father, who was half Burkinabé and half French, met in France while he was studying there.

Having originally studied mathematics, Bouyain later shifted her attention to cinematography, studying at the Louis Lumière School of Cinematography. She went on to work as a camerawomen for several films, and eventually directed several of her own. In 2000, she created the documentary film Les enfants du Blanc.

She wrote her book Metisse façon in 2003 after researching her African heritage in Burkina Faso. She learned of the history of Upper Volta (as Burkina Faso was known in colonial times) and of children who were born to African women and French soldiers only to be forced to leave their mothers to live in orphanages. The characters in Metisse façon are based on these children.

Bouyain has also written articles, mainly on the theme of mixed-race and exile, for Africultures, Presence Africaine and CODESRIA.

Her first feature-length film is Notre Étrangère ("The Place In Between"; 2010), which The Hollywood Reporter called " A nicely observed docudrama about a biracial young French woman who goes back to her roots." The plot of the movie is based on a mixed race woman named Amy who moves back to Burkina Faso. The movie was co-written by Gaelle Mace and it premiered at the 2010 Toronto International Film Festival. Boyain claimed that the film took seven years to make in total. She said she did not watch many African films prior to making it.

Bouyain was one of the speakers at the African Women in Film Forum held in Accra, Ghana between 23 and 25 September 2013.

== Works ==
=== Films ===
- Niararaye (1997)
- Les enfants du Blanc (documentary; 2000)
- The Place in Between (2010)

=== Books ===
- Métisse façon (short stories; 2003)
