= Emanuel Hoss-Desmarais =

Canadian film director and screenwriter

- Occupations: filmmaker, screenwriter and actor
- Known for: Whitewash

Emanuel Hoss-Desmarais is a Canadian film director and screenwriter, who won the Claude Jutra Award in 2014 for his film Whitewash. He also won the award for Best New Narrative Director at the 2013 Tribeca Film Festival, and was a shortlisted nominee, with cowriter Marc Tulin, for Best Original Screenplay at the 2nd Canadian Screen Awards.

Previously an actor, whose credits include supporting roles in The Reagans, The Day After Tomorrow and Mars and April, Hoss-Desmarais has also worked in advertising as a commercial director, and directed the short films Table 13 and Marius Borodine.
