= Perry Bard =

Canadian artist (1944–2025)

Perry Bard (1944 – January 2025) was a Canadian interdisciplinary artist. She worked with film, site-specific public art installation projects around the world, and on the Internet.

Many of her projects were collaborations with the public and selected communities. In 2011, her work, Man with a Movie Camera: The Global Remake was chosen for inclusion in Google's selected top creative uses of the Internet. In 2010 the project was named one of the Top 25 Videos for the Guggenheim Museum's YouTube Play Biennial of Creative Video. For the public participation project, Bard invited interpretations of Dziga Vertov's classic 1929 film Man with a Movie Camera, through uploads to a web site where software designed for the project archives sequences and streams a new film daily on the site. "The viewer sees two concurrent sets of images on a single screen: Vertov's original film and the remake of it that has been constructed on the Internet." The film has been shown at the Moscow International Film Festival, the Toronto International Film Festival, and the International Documentary Film Festival Amsterdam, at the Transmediale Berlin and won awards at Ars Electronica, Liedts-Meesen, and Transitio_MX. The remade film "exists on the Web, at media festivals, and in the gallery and museum but also travels and is launched on outdoor public commons screens." Evelin Stermitz quotes Bard in an interview in Rhizome: "The primary idea was to use global input via the Internet to generate multiple versions of one film to be screened in public space and on the web."

== Background ==
Bard was born in Quebec City, Canada in 1944. She died in New York City in January 2025.

== Career ==
Bard created Status: Stolen, a public work focused on artifacts missing from Iraq's Baghdad Museum in 2005. A mobile truckside billboard depicting the missing artifacts traversed New York City for thirty days in June 2005. "Bard's itinerant billboard served as an aide-memoire, reminding us that military victory and cultural conquest go hand in hand." A number of magazine advertisements featuring the artifacts followed in issues of Art Journal in 2006.

She also often wrote for Afterimage: The Journal of Media Arts and Cultural Criticism, and has curated a number of exhibitions in the United States and abroad.

Bard earned a B.A. at McGill University, and an M.F.A. degree at the San Francisco Art Institute. She pursued doctoral studies at the University of Wisconsin where she completed all but a dissertation in French Theatre studies. She moved to New York City in 1983. Bard has taught graduate and undergraduate art for many years in New York at the School of Visual Arts and the Pratt institute.

== Early work ==
- The Times, an installation at Petrosino Park, New York City. Steel and mirror "roof," and the first paragraph of Charles Dickens' Tale of Two Cities painted backwards on the sidewalk referencing homelessness. Commissioned by the Lower Manhattan Cultural Council, 1992.
- Back Seat Foot Arm Lead, an installation at P.S. 1. Twelve desk arms mounted on steel poles with typical desk chair cast in lead; slide projection of students' feet crossing and uncrossing at the foot of the chair, 1991.
- Shelters and Other Spaces, an installation at the SculptureCenter in New York. Concrete blocks, rocks, slide projector with 81 pictures of temporary shelters on the streets of New York City projected onto glass "pillow" and cardboard shelter bought from Scott, who was living on the street.

== Collaborative work ==
- The Terminal Salon, a site-specific public video projection at the Staten Island Ferry Terminal, in collaboration with residents of a housing project on Staten Island, commissioned by Sailors' Snug Harbor and produced in collaboration with the New York City Housing Authority and the Department of Transportation, 2000.
- Walk This Way, a rear-screen video projection in a public square in Middlesbrough, United Kingdom, in collaboration with at-risk teens invited by the University of Teesside, 2001.
- Boomerang: No Delay, a Skype collaboration with Alejandro Jaramillio Hoyos, Bogotá, on remake of Nancy Holt's and Richard Serra's video Boomerang, 2011.

== Later projects ==
- Hotel. A performance and a video installation commissioned for the First International Biennial of Art Cartagena, Colombia. Gestures of waiters choreographed and performed in collaboration with dancers from El Colegio del Cuerpo for the city whose largest employer is the hotel industry, 2014.
- Out My Window Down the Alley Around the Corner and Up the Block. Houses, hotels and technoculture mix in this video where inside, outside, public and private dissolve into one gentrifying landscape. Single channel video screened in Documentary Fortnight at the Museum of Modern Art, New York (2015); two channel installation with 3D objects exhibited at Joyce Yahouda Gallery, Montreal, 2014.
- Traffic, a documentary short film about the knock-off trade on Canal Street, New York City, as part of Documentary Fortnight, Vipe International Media Festival, Basel, 2005.
- The Meaning of Bialy, a video installation commissioned by Hybrid Dwellings, Arsenal Gallery, Białystok, Poland. Bialys are returned to Bialystok, their point of origin in this artwork which uses food to reveal cultural practices, prejudices and histories, 2001.

== Awards ==
- Google's 106 Best Uses of the Web, 2011
- Guggenheim YouTube Play Biennial, Top 25, 2010
- Liedts Meesen Technological Award, Honorary Mention, 2010
- Transitio_MX, Honorable Mention, 2010
- Video 2000, The Contemporary Museum, Baltimore, Maryland, 2000
- Yaddo Fellow, 1988

== Grants ==
- Canada Council for the Arts, 2008, 1994, 1991, 1990, 1989, 1986, 1985, 1981
- New York Foundation for the Arts, Individual Artist Grant, 2009
- Puffin Foundation Grant, 2005
- Pollock-Krasner Foundation Grant, 1990
- National Endowment for the Arts, 1983

== Selected curated exhibitions ==
- OWS New York Video Vortex 8, Museum of Contemporary Art, Zagreb, Croatia, 2012
- Life on the Screen, Joyce Yahouda Gallery, Montreal, Canada, 2011
- Multitude Singular, co-curated with Berta Sichel, Reina Sofia Museum, Madrid, Spain, 2009
- Fierce Logic (En Perfecto Desorden), Reina Sofia Museum, Madrid, Spain, 2007
- Post-Yugoslavia Video Program, Art in General, New York, 2005
