= Massy Tadjedin =

Iranian-American screenwriter and director

- مسی تاجدین
- Born: 1978 (age 47–48); Tehran, Imperial State of Iran
- Occupations: Screenwriter & Director
- Spouse: Babak Fardin

Massy Tadjedin (Persian: مسی تاج‌الدین; born 1978) is an Iranian-American screenwriter and director.

== Biography ==
Tadjedin was born in Tehran and grew up in Orange County, California, and studied English literature at Harvard University.

Her movie credits include Leo (original screenplay, 2002) and The Jacket (adapted screenplay 2005).

Tadjedin's directorial debut is Last Night, which stars Keira Knightley and Eva Mendes, and was released in the United States on May 6, 2011.

In 2012, Tadjedin was commissioned by Miu Miu to make a short film as part of their series Women’s Tales. "It's Getting Late" premiered at the 69th Venice International Film Festival.

Tadjedin is married to Babak Fardin, an Iranian American ophthalmologist, whom she met at Harvard. Tadjedin lives in Los Angeles.

== DVD ==
- The Jacket (Warner Home Video, release date: 6/21/2005, UPC: 85393368524)
- Leo (First Look Pictures, release date: 5/18/2004, UPC: 687797103994)
