= Inside America =

2010 film

- Directed by: Barbara Eder
- Written by: Barbara Eder
- Produced by: Constanze Schumann
- Starring: Patty Barrera
- Cinematography: Christian Haake
- Release date: 18 March 2010
- Running time: 107 minutes
- Country: Austria
- Language: English

Inside America is a 2010 English-language Austrian drama film written and directed by Barbara Eder. The film is Eder's debut and it won the Special Jury Prize at the Max Ophüls Film Festival.

== Cast ==
- Patty Barrera as Patty
- Raul I. Juarez as Manni
- Carlos Benavides as Carlos
- Edward K. Bravo as Lalo
- Luis De Los Santos as Ricky
- Zuleyma Jaime as Zuly
- Roberto A. Perez as Fuego
- Aimee Lizette Saldivar as Aimee
- Carolyn Sanchez as Carol
