= List of Canadian actors =

Flag of Canada

This is an alphabetical list of notable Canadian actors. Some may have dual nationalities, being born elsewhere.

== A ==
- Graham Abbey
- Alistair Abell
- Alejandro Abellan
- Raymond Ablack
- Taylor Abrahamse
- Jared Abrahamson
- Aaron Abrams
- Rudwan Khalil Abubaker
- Dalmar Abuzeid
- Susan Aceron
- Mark Acheson
- Sharon Acker
- Jean Adair
- Beverly Adams
- Claire Adams
- Evan Adams
- Marty Adams
- Patrick J. Adams
- R. J. Adams
- Lovell Adams-Gray
- Michael Adamthwaite
- Rebecca Addelman
- Dayo Ade
- Melyssa Ade
- Oluniké Adeliyi
- Neil Affleck
- Arlen Aguayo-Stewart
- Carmen Aguirre
- Paul Ahmarani
- Andrew Airlie
- Daniela Akerblom
- Jeremy Akerman
- Malin Åkerman
- Marc Akerstream
- Philip Akin
- Denis Akiyama
- Karina Aktouf
- Fajer Al-Kaisi
- Jordan Alexander
- Kathryn Alexandre
- Toya Alexis
- Aisha Alfa
- Hrant Alianak
- Harris Allan
- Martha Allan
- Maud Allan
- Brittany Allen
- Ricca Allen
- Sarah Allen
- Tanya Allen
- Thom Allison
- Sheldon Allman
- James Allodi
- John Allore
- David Alpay
- Melissa Altro
- Clyde Alves
- Robbie Amell
- Stephen Amell
- Lara Amersey
- Jessica Amlee
- Ali Ammar
- Prince Amponsah
- Dana Andersen
- Ever Anderson
- Greg Anderson
- Hannah Emily Anderson
- Melissa Sue Anderson
- Melody Anderson
- Pamela Anderson
- Shamier Anderson
- Tori Anderson
- Starr Andreeff
- Thea Andrews
- Gene Andrusco
- Christopher Angatookalook
- Anne Anglin
- Margaret Anglin
- Kristi Angus
- Paul Anka
- Catherine Annau
- Zachary Ansley
- Trey Anthony
- Benz Antoine
- Vinessa Antoine
- Salvatore Antonio
- Danny Antonucci
- Cas Anvar
- Magda Apanowicz
- Natalie Appleton
- Nicole Appleton
- Aurélia Arandi-Longpré
- Manuel Aranguiz
- Nicole Arbour
- Steve Arbuckle
- Denys Arcand
- Gabriel Arcand
- Nathaniel Arcand
- Nico Archambault
- Amanda Arcuri
- Charles Arling
- Aviva Armour-Ostroff
- Brad Armstrong
- Dean Armstrong
- Tré Armstrong
- François Arnaud
- Will Arnett
- Stefan Arngrim
- Charlotte Arnold
- Craig Arnold
- Daniel Arnold
- Lawrence Aronovitch
- Sylvio Arriola
- Nina Arsenault
- Benjamin Arthur
- Julia Arthur
- Anthony Asbury
- Lauren Ash
- Angela Asher
- Aaron Ashmore
- Shawn Ashmore
- Cynthia Ashperger
- Ted Atherton
- Harvey Atkin
- Damien Atkins
- David Atkinson
- Robin Aubert
- Charlotte Aubin
- Viviane Audet
- Melissa Auf der Maur
- Gerald Auger
- Matt Austin
- Teri Austin
- Roger Avary
- Marie Avgeropoulos
- Lise-Yolande Awashish
- Makram Ayache
- Dan Aykroyd
- Peter Aykroyd
- Kristian Ayre
- Benjamin Ayres
- Caroline Azar
- Yank Azman
[top]

== B ==
- Laurie Babin
- Joanna Bacalso
- Sebastian Bach
- Steve Bacic
- Clark Backo
- Ali Rizvi Badshah
- Bilal Baig
- Julian Bailey
- Paule Baillargeon
- Bonar Bain
- Conrad Bain
- Jennifer Bain
- Bob Bainborough
- Scott Bairstow
- Neeru Bajwa
- Joby Baker
- Malia Baker
- Simon R. Baker
- Brigitte Bako
- Liane Balaban
- Rogelio Balagtas
- Sumathy Balaram
- Karen Dianne Baldwin
- Lise Baldwin
- Robert Baldwin
- Liza Balkan
- Ashleigh Ball
- Linda Ballantyne
- Ella Ballentine
- Chasty Ballesteros
- Heather Bambrick
- James Bamford
- Carl Banas
- Cameron Bancroft
- Andrea Bang
- Diana Bang
- Boyd Banks
- Perry Banks
- Sydney Banks
- Margaret Bannerman
- Shanice Banton
- Sofia Banzhaf
- Anaïs Barbeau-Lavalette
- Gillian Barber
- John Barbour
- Amanda Barker
- Jessica Barker
- Emilie-Claire Barlow
- Demore Barnes
- Kathleen Barr
- Sarah Barrable-Tishauer
- Brent Barraclough
- Katherine Barrell
- Michel Barrette
- Yvon Barrette
- Alex Barris
- Mabel Barrison
- Claudja Barry
- Lawrence Barry
- Lilly Bartlam
- Jay Baruchel
- Gary Basaraba
- Earl W. Bascom
- Ben Bass
- Keana Lyn Bastidas
- Nick Bateman
- David Bateson
- Elise Bauman
- Eric Bauza
- Jennifer Baxter
- Frances Bay
- Adam Beach
- Tara Beagan
- Gerry Bean
- Stephanie Beard
- Alexandra Beaton
- Rod Beattie
- Nancy Beatty
- Robert Beatty
- Tanaya Beatty
- Maev Beaty
- Edik Beddoes
- Ben Beauchemin
- Michelle Beaudoin
- Christine Beaulieu
- Léokim Beaumier-Lépine
- Bobby Becken
- Henry Beckman
- Steven Bednarski
- Samantha Bee
- Jennifer Beech
- Christian Bégin
- Bernard Behrens
- Dan Beirne
- Brendan Beiser
- Walter Belasco
- Lisa Ann Beley
- Juliette Béliveau
- Véronique Béliveau
- Nour Belkhiria
- Doron Bell
- Jade C. Bell
- Jill Belland
- Marie-Hélène Bellavance
- Rykko Bellemare
- Kwena Bellemare-Boivin
- Ryan Belleville
- Ray Bellew
- Paul Bellini
- Scott Bellis
- Cynthia Belliveau
- Gil Bellows
- Félix-Antoine Bénard
- Marc Bendavid
- Clé Bennett
- Matthew Bennett
- Sonja Bennett
- Sophie Bennett
- Stephanie Bennett
- Zachary Bennett
- Tyrone Benskin
- Julia Benson
- Shaun Benson
- Lyriq Bent
- Zahra Bentham
- Michael Benyaer
- Françoise Berd
- Annick Bergeron
- Jean-Pierre Bergeron
- Sheldon Bergstrom
- Norm Berketa
- Camille Bernard
- Denis Bernard
- Micheline Bernard
- Michael Bernardo
- Kevin Bernhardt
- David Berni
- Lisa Berry
- Tamara Bernier Evans
- Karen Bernstein
- Dorothée Berryman
- Attila Bertalan
- Karen Bertelsen
- Laura Bertram
- William Bertram
- Antoine Bertrand
- Jocelyn Bérubé
- Ardon Bess
- Frida Betrani
- Salome Bey
- Nadine Bhabha
- Raoul Bhaneja
- Juliette Bharucha
- Sonya Biddle
- Cyril Biddulph
- Émilie Bierre
- Guy Big
- Lani Billard
- Emmanuel Bilodeau
- Jean-Luc Bilodeau
- Vincent Bilodeau
- Luke Bilyk
- Sahar Biniaz
- Morris Birdyellowhead
- Len Birman
- Shaughnessy Bishop-Stall
- Kirsten Bishopric
- Thor Bishopric
- Sandrine Bisson
- Yannick Bisson
- Joel Bissonnette
- Catherine Black
- Jully Black
- Ryan Rajendra Black
- Tricia Black
- Julian Black Antelope
- Ian Blackwood
- Bre Blair
- Lionel Blair
- Isabelle Blais
- Peter Blais
- Mervyn Blake
- William Rufus Blake
- Claude Blanchard
- Rachel Blanchard
- Neal Bledsoe
- Alan Bleviss
- Jason Blicker
- Genevieve Blinn
- Cherish Violet Blood
- Ben Blue
- Jack Blum
- Trevor Blumas
- Lothaire Bluteau
- Domini Blythe
- Bruce Boa
- Daniela Bobadilla
- Columpa Bobb
- Hart Bochner
- Lloyd Bochner
- Robert Bockstael
- Rick Bognar
- Michael Boisvert
- Joanne Boland
- Katie Boland
- Rick Boland
- Louise Bombardier
- James Bondy
- Rosalie Bonenfant
- Yolanda Bonnell
- Céline Bonnier
- Linwood Boomer
- Nikohl Boosheri
- Kristin Booth
- Lindy Booth
- Sarah Booth
- Christa Borden
- Walter Borden
- Peter Boretski
- Anne-Élisabeth Bossé
- Réal Bossé
- Devon Bostick
- Sara Botsford
- Ashley Botting
- Jean-Guy Bouchard
- Raymond Bouchard
- Alpha Boucher
- Daniel Boucher
- Jean-Carl Boucher
- Nicole Bouma
- Marie-Claude Bourbonnais
- Hélène Bourgeois Leclerc
- J. R. Bourne
- David Boutin
- Annie Bovaird
- Geoffrey Bowes
- Cory Bowles
- Jeffrey Bowyer-Chapman
- Garen Boyajian
- Lynda Boyd
- John Boylan
- Bernard Braden
- Justin Bradley
- Paul Bradley
- Glenda Braganza
- Tom Braidwood
- Paula Brancati
- Jock Brandis
- André Brassard
- Marie Brassard
- Pierre Brassard
- Paul-André Brasseur
- Normand Brathwaite
- Steve Braun
- Paul Braunstein
- Eugene Brave Rock
- Jay Brazeau
- Peter Breck
- John Bregar
- Stéphane Breton
- Beverley Breuer
- Krista Bridges
- Benoît Brière
- Annie M. Briggs
- Cameron Bright
- Pierre-Luc Brillant
- Yvette Brind'Amour
- Christopher Britton
- Ryder Britton
- Dave Broadfoot
- Cecil Broadhurst
- Daniel Brochu
- Evelyne Brochu
- Sage Brocklebank
- Leanna Brodie
- Stefan Brogren
- Valri Bromfield
- Daniel Brooks
- Danny Brooks
- Elisabeth Brooks
- Norman Brooks
- Shelton Brooks
- Geneviève Brouillette
- Isabelle Brouillette
- Robert Brouillette
- J. Adam Brown
- Aisha Brown
- Charity Brown
- Darrin Brown
- Divine Brown
- Don Brown
- Jefferson Brown
- Miquel Brown
- Natalie Brown
- Rae Brown
- Aurora Browne
- Christine Brubaker
- Dylan Bruce
- William J. Bruce III
- Amanda Brugel
- Robin Brûlé
- Éric Bruneau
- Laura Bruneau
- Lucas Bryant
- Billy Bryk
- Greg Bryk
- Michael Bublé
- A. J. Buckley
- Barbara Budd
- Genevieve Buechner
- Joe Buffalo
- Valerie Buhagiar
- Geneviève Bujold
- Evan Buliung
- James Bulliard
- Kylie Bunbury
- Michael Burgess
- Phil Burke
- Samson Burke
- Fulton Burley
- Tom Burlinson
- Alaina Burnett
- Martha Burns
- Raymond Burr
- Jackie Burroughs
- Janet Burston
- Cindy Busby
- Tom Busby
- Howard Busgang
- Arabella Bushnell
- Pascale Bussières
- Adam Butcher
- Mandy Butcher
- Dean Butler
- Tom Butler
- Brent Butt
- George Buza
- Steve Byers
- Jim Byrnes
[top]

== C ==
- Eric Cabral
- Lally Cadeau
- Anne-Marie Cadieux
- Jason Cadieux
- Sophie Cadieux
- Inga Cadranel
- Leah Cairns
- David Calderisi
- Natasha Calis
- Kay Callard
- Jaime Callica
- Alexander Calvert
- Jesse Camacho
- Mark Camacho
- Rod Cameron
- Benedict Campbell
- Chuck Campbell
- Douglas Campbell
- Conchita Campbell
- Deragh Campbell
- Neve Campbell
- Nicholas Campbell
- Paul Campbell
- Rohan Campbell
- Jennifer Candy
- John Candy
- Sara Canning
- Wanda Cannon
- Patricia Cano
- Yvan Canuel
- Cliff Cardinal
- Imajyn Cardinal
- Lorne Cardinal
- Pierre-Yves Cardinal
- Tantoo Cardinal
- Jesse Carere
- Len Cariou
- Ben Carlson
- Len Carlson
- Leslie Carlson
- Paul Carpenter
- Jim Carrey
- Luciana Carro
- Jack Carson
- Alex Carter
- Sarah Carter
- Peggy Cartwright
- Brent Carver
- Dillon Casey
- John Cassini
- Tory Cassis
- France Castel
- Ariane Castellanos
- Aimée Castle
- Maggie Castle
- Marilyn Castonguay
- Roch Castonguay
- Anna Cathcart
- Kim Cattrall
- Scott Cavalheiro
- Lynne Cavanagh
- Tom Cavanagh
- Caroline Cave
- Nicola Cavendish
- Michael Cera
- Erica Cerra
- Catherine Chabot
- Garry Chalk
- Sarah Chalke
- Munro Chambers
- Dan Chameroy
- Andrée Champagne
- Louis Champagne
- Suzanne Champagne
- Aimee Chan
- Shannon Chan-Kent
- Candy Chang
- Keshia Chanté
- Julia Chantrey
- Alexander Chapman
- Yvonne Chapman
- Ajahnis Charley
- Christine Chatelain
- Anna Chatterton
- Justin Chatwin
- Osric Chau
- Saara Chaudry
- Maury Chaykin
- Hannah Cheesman
- Terry Chen
- Évelyne de la Chenelière
- Joyce Cheng
- Olivia Cheng
- Dmitry Chepovetsky
- Jonas Chernick
- Cayle Chernin
- Richard Chevolleau
- Charly Chiarelli
- Gina Chiarelli
- Émi Chicoine
- Frank Chiesurin
- Juan Chioran
- Louis Chirillo
- Mary-Colin Chisholm
- Monia Chokri
- Charlene Choi
- Ins Choi
- Tommy Chong
- Rae Dawn Chong
- Robbi Chong
- Lara Jean Chorostecki
- Billy Chow
- Janet Chow
- Lori Chow
- Valerie Chow
- Vivian Chow
- Emmanuelle Chriqui
- Hayden Christensen
- Dinah Christie
- Warren Christie
- Eric Christmas
- Babz Chula
- Christy Chung
- Linda Chung
- Berton Churchill
- Annie Clark
- Chelsea Clark
- Daniel Clark
- Jordan Clark
- Robert Clark
- Susan Clark
- Braeden Clarke
- Richard Clarkin
- Helene Clarkson
- Véronique Claveau
- Zoe Cleland
- Suzanne Clément
- Sasha Clements
- Glory Annen Clibbery
- Karen Cliche
- Joshua Close
- Robert Clothier
- Fabien Cloutier
- Suzanne Cloutier
- William Cloutier
- Conrad Coates
- Kim Coates
- Joe Cobden
- Jim Codrington
- Lisa Codrington
- Joy Coghill
- Michael D. Cohen
- Enrico Colantoni
- Fabienne Colas
- Keith Cole
- Layne Coleman
- Renée Coleman
- John Colicos
- Lynn Colliar
- Frédérique Collin
- Pierre Collin
- Carla Collins
- Dorothy Collins
- Joely Collins
- K.C. Collins
- Lauren Collins
- Patricia Collins
- Richard Collins
- Esteban Comilang
- Tim Conlon
- Chad Connell
- Nazneen Contractor
- A. J. Cook
- Ryan Cooley
- Beverley Cooper
- Jenny Cooper
- Darla Contois
- Robin-Joël Cool
- Jon Cor
- Milya Corbeil Gauvreau
- Henry Corden
- Nick Cordero
- Amanda Cordner
- Claire Corlett
- Ian James Corlett
- Gordon Cormier
- Jacinta Cormier
- Marie-Andrée Corneille
- Lisa Michelle Cornelius
- Belinda Cornish
- Nelson Coronado
- Nicola Correia-Damude
- Penelope Corrin
- Larissa Corriveau
- Paulo Costanzo
- Irlande Côté
- Julianne Côté
- Michel Côté
- Ben Cotton
- Clare Coulter
- Alyson Court
- Emily Coutts
- Angèle Coutu
- Jean Coutu
- Christina Cox
- Deborah Cox
- Richard Ian Cox
- Susan Coyne
- Georgia Craig
- Kelly Craig
- Michael Cram
- Joey Cramer
- Phyllis Crane
- Matt Craven
- Gavin Crawford
- Mark Crawford
- Rachael Crawford
- Michelle Creber
- Jack Creley
- Wendy Crewson
- Amanda Crew
- Mark Critch
- Roark Critchlow
- Jonathan Crombie
- Neil Crone
- Rachel Cronin
- Hume Cronyn
- Roger Cross
- Josephine Crowell
- Katie Crown
- Alex Crowther
- Marie-Josée Croze
- David Cubitt
- Daniel Cudmore
- Leah Renee Cudmore
- Peter Cullen
- Sean Cullen
- Anna Cummer
- Seán Cummings
- Martin Cummins
- Peter Cureton
- Gordon Currie
- Pierre Curzi
- Elisha Cuthbert
- Guillaume Cyr
- Isabelle Cyr
- Myriam Cyr
- René Richard Cyr
- Henry Czerny
[top]

== D ==
- Peter DaCunha
- Gail Dahms
- Cynthia Dale
- Jennifer Dale
- Nathan Dales
- Sean Dalton
- Normand D'Amour
- Lawrence Dane
- Normand Daneau
- Tony Daniels
- Roman Danylo
- Diane D'Aquila
- Dominic Darceuil
- Agam Darshi
- Raven Dauda
- Jill Daum
- Charlie David
- Ellen David
- Lolita Davidovich
- Lucinda Davis
- Mackenzie Davis
- Millie Davis
- Tanyalee Davis
- William B. Davis
- Tracy Dawson
- Carol-Anne Day
- Mark Day
- Nicole de Boer
- Yvonne De Carlo
- Laura de Carteret
- Maxime de Cotret
- Richard de Klerk
- Catherine De Léan
- Julian De Zotti
- Lucy DeCoutere
- Bénédicte Décary
- Gerry Dee
- James DeFelice
- Louis Del Grande
- Maria del Mar
- Jason Deline
- Marya Delver
- Kris Demeanor
- Stéphane Demers
- Katherine DeMille
- Neil Denis
- Romane Denis
- Nicole de Boer
- Laysla De Oliveira
- Miranda de Pencier
- Kelly Depeault
- John DeSantis
- Daniel DeSanto
- Josée Deschênes
- Mackenzie Desgranges
- Michèle Deslauriers
- Mélissa Désormeaux-Poulin
- Trevor Devall
- Paula Devicq
- William deVry
- Colleen Dewhurst
- Philip DeWilde
- Caroline Dhavernas
- Sébastien Dhavernas
- Vekeana Dhillon
- Domenic Di Rosa
- Sergio Di Zio
- Alex Diakun
- Chris Diamantopoulos
- Selma Diamond
- Liam Diaz
- Byrd Dickens
- Steffi DiDomenicantonio
- Brett Dier
- Lauren Diewold
- Holly Dignard
- Hugh Dillon
- Eleonora Dimakos
- Adam DiMarco
- Melissa DiMarco
- Mylène Dinh-Robic
- Joe Dinicol
- Bruce Dinsmore
- Ma-Anne Dionisio
- Catherine Disher
- Anne Ditchburn
- Sean Dixon
- Chloé Djandji
- Dianne Doan
- Nina Dobrev
- Fefe Dobson
- Heather Doerksen
- Daniel Doheny
- Lexa Doig
- Xavier Dolan
- Cindy Dolenc
- Damon D'Oliveira
- Nancy Dolman
- Lesleh Donaldson
- Peter Donaldson
- Richard Donat
- Marc Donato
- James Doohan
- Mike Dopud
- Lévi Doré
- Cory Doran
- Brooke D'Orsay
- Fifi D'Orsay
- Anne Dorval
- Aaron Douglas
- Jeff Douglas
- Joanna Douglas
- Katie Douglas
- Shirley Douglas
- Nathalie Doummar
- Alisen Down
- Nigel Downer
- Brian Downey
- Riele Downs
- Aaryn Doyle
- Shawn Doyle
- John Drainie
- Martin Drainville
- Patricia Drake
- Sylvie Drapeau
- Marie Dressler
- Spencer Drever
- Patrick Drolet
- Brian Drummond
- Kate Drummond
- Laura Drummond
- Julie du Page
- Ellen Dubin
- Leon Dubinsky
- Martin Dubreuil
- Francis Ducharme
- Deborah Duchêne
- Cara Duff-MacCormick
- Burkely Duffield
- Victoria Duffield
- Robin Duke
- Douglass Dumbrille
- Dawson Dunbar
- Arlene Duncan
- Barrie Dunn
- Carolyn Dunn
- Paul Dunn
- Robin Dunne
- Callum Dunphy
- Rosemary Dunsmore
- John Dunsworth
- Molly Dunsworth
- Sarah E. Dunsworth
- Roy Dupuis
- Erica Durance
- Kevin Durand
- Deanna Durbin
- Félix-Antoine Duval
- Peter Dvorsky
- Karyn Dwyer
[top]

== E ==
- Chris Earle
- Edward Earle
- Sam Earle
- Katherine East
- Jayne Eastwood
- Maude Eburne
- Matthew Edison
- Sarah Edmondson
- Harry Edwards
- Atom Egoyan
- Ali Eisner
- David Eisner
- Michael Eklund
- Candace Elaine
- Melissa Elias
- Neil Elias
- Lawrence Elion
- Brennan Elliott
- David James Elliott
- Laurie Elliott
- Lillian Elliott
- Ephraim Ellis
- Tracey Ellis
- Mazin Elsadig
- Ralph Endersby
- Hannah Endicott-Douglas
- Vivien Endicott-Douglas
- Anke Engelke
- Aryana Engineer
- Jake Epstein
- Josh Epstein
- Kaj-Erik Eriksen
- Rose-Maïté Erkoreka
- Myles Erlick
- Ennis Esmer
- Izad Etemadi
- Mary Jo Eustace
- Daniella Evangelista
- Lini Evans
- Aisha Evelyna
- Dylan Everett
- Erik Everhard
- Jacob Ewaniuk
- Sophia Ewaniuk
- Fred Ewanuick
- Irdens Exantus
[top]

== F ==
- Mickey Faerch
- Megan Fahlenbock
- Meegwun Fairbrother
- Kristin Fairlie
- Elisabetta Fantone
- Stacey Farber
- James Farentino
- Stella Farentino
- Jillian Fargey
- Darrell Faria
- Marianne Farley
- Gary Farmer
- Shannon Farnon
- Alexia Fast
- Françoise Faucher
- Sophie Faucher
- Angela Featherstone
- Matreya Fedor
- Tania Fédor
- Brendan Fehr
- Darcy Fehr
- Colm Feore
- Colin Ferguson
- Max Ferguson
- Jodelle Ferland
- Rodrigo Fernandez-Stoll
- Charlene Fernetz
- Louis Ferreira
- Claudia Ferri
- Samantha Ferris
- David Ferry
- Sedina Fiati
- Danielle Fichaud
- Nathan Fielder
- Joy Fielding
- Denise Filiatrault
- Vasilios Filippakis
- Fab Filippo
- Nathan Fillion
- Katie Findlay
- Timothy Findley
- Ken Finkleman
- Carrie Finlay
- Jennifer Finnigan
- Christine Firkins
- Brandon Firla
- Rhiannon Fish
- Noel Fisher
- Catherine Fitch
- Erin Fitzgerald
- Diane Flacks
- Erin Fleming
- Brendan Fletcher
- Page Fletcher
- Sharry Flett
- Hélène Florent
- Waawaate Fobister
- Dave Foley
- Maddy Foley
- Megan Follows
- Ted Follows
- Angela Fong
- Chantal Fontaine
- Sharon Fontaine-Ishpatao
- Glenn Ford
- Luke Ford
- Melyssa Ford
- Louise Forestier
- Jenn Forgie
- Rosemary Forsyth
- Marianne Fortier
- Virginie Fortin
- Dianne Foster
- Lisa Foster
- Carly Foulkes
- Colin Fox
- David Fox
- Gavin Fox
- Michael J. Fox
- Andrew Francis
- Jordan Francis
- Stewart Francis
- Don Francks
- Rainbow Sun Francks
- Jill Frappier
- Brendan Fraser
- Duncan Fraser
- Danny Freedman
- Jahmil French
- Matt Frewer
- Jonathan Frid
- Darren Frost
- Brian Froud
- Fiona Fu
- Allegra Fulton
- Nolan Gerard Funk
- Pier-Luc Funk
- Nelly Furtado
- Angela Fusco
[top]

== G ==
- Richard Gabourie
- Sarah Gadon
- Lorena Gale
- Vincent Gale
- Brendan Gall
- Patrick Gallagher
- Étienne Galloy
- Angela Galuppo
- Robin Gammell
- Nisha Ganatra
- Monique Ganderton
- Lily Gao
- Soo Garay
- Hope Garber
- Victor Garber
- Saskia Garel
- Krystal Garib
- Juliette Gariépy
- Shailene Garnett
- Pauline Garon
- Gabriel Gascon
- Kathleen Gati
- Elise Gatien
- Maxim Gaudette
- Peter Kelly Gaudreault
- Chris Gauthier
- Holly Gauthier-Frankel
- Fran Gebhard
- Jeff Geddis
- Cara Gee
- Éveline Gélinas
- Gratien Gélinas
- Mitsou Gélinas
- Jasmin Geljo
- Yani Gellman
- Chief Dan George
- Kat Germain
- Nicole Germain
- Bruno Gerussi
- Mark Ghanimé
- Christine Ghawi
- Leah Gibson
- Martha Gibson
- Sally Gifford
- Marie Gignac
- John Gilbert
- Onalea Gilbertson
- Keir Gilchrist
- Lara Gilchrist
- Thea Gill
- Charlie Gillespie
- Daniel Gillies
- Jennifer Gillis
- Gail Gilmore
- Patrick Gilmore
- Marion Gilsenan
- Jessalyn Gilsig
- Nadia Giosia
- Rémy Girard
- Fernande Giroux
- Michelle Giroux
- Joanna Gleason
- Edward Glen
- Stephen Kramer Glickman
- Susan Glover
- Grace Glowicki
- Colton Gobbo
- Maurice Godin
- Sarah Goldberg
- Jake Goldsbie
- Ana Golja
- Karine Gonthier-Hyndman
- Humberly González
- Patrice Goodman
- Linda Goranson
- Barbara Gordon
- Joel Gordon
- Matt Gordon
- Eli Goree
- Tamara Gorski
- Ryan Gosling
- Benoît Gouin
- Mickaël Gouin
- Glen Gould
- Jen Gould
- Nicolette Goulet
- Rémi Goulet
- Robert Goulet
- Luba Goy
- Alexandre Goyette
- Patrick Goyette
- Dakota Goyo
- Aubrey Graham
- Currie Graham
- Sam Grana
- Jon Granik
- Anais Granofsky
- Sam De Grasse
- Rachel Graton
- Ona Grauer
- Brittany Gray
- Bruce Gray
- Carsen Gray
- Mackenzie Gray
- Jason Gray-Stanford
- Neil Grayston
- Marco Grazzini
- Sabrina Grdevich
- Dallas Green
- George Green
- Janet-Laine Green
- Rick Green
- Tom Green
- Graham Greene
- Lorne Greene
- Dawn Greenhalgh
- Bruce Greenwood
- Kathy Greenwood
- Lyndie Greenwood
- Douglas Grégoire
- Yamie Grégoire
- Macha Grenon
- Sarah Grey
- Michael Greyeyes
- Katie Griffin
- Lynne Griffin
- Nonnie Griffin
- Linda Griffiths
- Shenae Grimes
- Amy Groening
- Marc-André Grondin
- Hannah Gross
- Paul Gross
- David Paul Grove
- Deborah Grover
- Jesse Noah Gruman
- Nicky Guadagni
- Marie-Ginette Guay
- Isabelle Guérard
- Maude Guérin
- Élise Guilbault
- Luce Guilbeault
- Paul Gury
[top]

== H ==
- Benita Ha
- Brandon Hackett
- Dayle Haddon
- Kristen Hager
- Garrick Hagon
- Abby Hagyard
- Medina Hahn
- Corey Haim
- Haji
- HAUI
- Jennifer Hale
- Jonathan Hale
- Geri Hall
- Monty Hall
- Natalie Hall
- Meredith Hama-Brown
- Barbara Hamilton
- Patricia Hamilton
- Quancetia Hamilton
- Lauren Hammersley
- Emily Hampshire
- Danielle Hampton
- Kevin Hanchard
- Elizabeth Hanna
- Hamza Haq
- Eve Harlow
- Shalom Harlow
- Jessica Harmon
- Richard Harmon
- Patricia Harras
- Johanne Harrelle
- Adam J. Harrington
- Ashleigh Harrington
- Barbara Eve Harris
- Jonny Harris
- Laura Harris
- Don Harron
- Joan Hart
- Phil Hartman
- Ellie Harvie
- Susan Haskell
- Ali Hassan
- Jade Hassouné
- Thomas Hauff
- Allan Hawco
- Terri Hawkes
- Alana Hawley Purvis
- Kay Hawtrey
- Carter Hayden
- Lili Haydn
- Jordan Hayes
- David Hayter
- Terra Hazelton
- William Healy
- Dianne Heatherington
- Dakota Ray Hebert
- Meghan Heffern
- Jayne Heitmeyer
- Tricia Helfer
- Ocean Hellman
- Anne Helm
- Peter Helm
- John Hemphill
- Dell Henderson
- Meredith Henderson
- Saffron Henderson
- Dan Hennessey
- Elley-Ray Hennessy
- Jacqueline Hennessy
- Jill Hennessy
- Kate Hennig
- Ely Henry
- Martha Henry
- Natasha Henstridge
- Marieve Herington
- Jimmy Herman
- Roland Hewgill
- Kerr Hewitt
- Sitara Hewitt
- David Hewlett
- Kate Hewlett
- Christopher Heyerdahl
- Tamara Hickey
- Torri Higginson
- Matt Hill
- Art Hindle
- Darryl Hinds
- Karen Hines
- Emily Hirst
- Patrick Hivon
- Ho Ka Kei (Jeff Ho)
- Chelsea Hobbs
- Edmund Hockridge
- Bryce Hodgson
- Gabriel Hogan
- Michael Hogan
- Susan Hogan
- Arthur Holden
- Gina Holden
- Laurie Holden
- Mark Holden
- Kris Holden-Ried
- Addison Holley
- Ben Hollingsworth
- Lauren Holly
- Adrian Holmes
- Emily Holmes
- Greyston Holt
- Sandrine Holt
- Saba Homayoon
- Elva Mai Hoover
- Barclay Hope
- Leslie Hope
- Tamara Hope
- William Hope
- Paul Hopkins
- Victoria Hopper
- Kaniehtiio Horn
- Christine Horne
- Chelah Horsdal
- Emanuel Hoss-Desmarais
- Jeremy Hotz
- Kenny Hotz
- Charles-Aubey Houde
- Germain Houde
- Louis-José Houde
- Serge Houde
- Denis Houle
- Alex House
- Dakota House
- Eric House
- Cole Howard
- Duane Howard
- Kathleen Howard
- Lisa Howard
- Ricardo Hoyos
- Tracey Hoyt
- Patrick Huard
- Rhys Huber
- Sébastien Huberdeau
- Alaina Huffman
- Kim Huffman
- Randy Hughson
- Kimberly Huie
- Ross Hull
- Luke Humphrey
- Mark Humphrey
- Emma Hunter
- Juliette Huot
- Walter Huston
- William Hutt
- Pascale Hutton
- Pam Hyatt
- Frances Hyland
- James Hyndman
- Tyler Hynes
[top]

== I ==
- L. Dean Ifill
- Steve Ihnat
- John Ioannou
- John Ireland
- Michael Ironside
- Britt Irvin
- Jennifer Irwin
- May Irwin
- Gérald Isaac
- Katharine Isabelle
- Nissae Isen
- Tajja Isen
- Ayisha Issa
- Johnny Issaluk
- Robert Ito
- Madeline Ivalu
- Paul-Dylan Ivalu
- Henriette Ivanans
[top]

== J ==
- Manny Jacinto
- Joshua Jackson
- Michael Jackson
- Tom Jackson
- Lou Jacobi
- Kawennáhere Devery Jacobs
- Christopher Jacot
- Ellyn Jade
- Chapelle Jaffe
- Nicole Jaffe
- Lisa Jakub
- Sabrina Jalees
- Ashton James
- Stephan James
- Alexane Jamieson
- Keira Jang
- Shadi Janho
- Joris Jarsky
- Sterling Jarvis
- Janyse Jaud
- Anik Jean
- Fayolle Jean
- Fayolle Jean Jr.
- Schelby Jean-Baptiste
- Garihanna Jean-Louis
- Andrew Jenkins
- Rebecca Jenkins
- Roy Jenson
- Connor Jessup
- Moe Jeudy-Lamour
- Marlene Jewell
- Robert Jezek
- Suresh Joachim
- Stephen Joffe
- Avan Jogia
- Balinder Johal
- Alexz Johnson
- C. David Johnson
- Clark Johnson
- Eric Johnson
- Lamar Johnson
- Marine Johnson
- Matt Johnson
- Taborah Johnson
- Jordan Johnson-Hinds
- Jamie Johnston
- Shaun Johnston
- Tyler Johnston
- Roni Jonah
- Andy Jones
- Cathy Jones
- G. B. Jones
- Rick Jones
- Ronalda Jones
- Tattiawna Jones
- Laura Jordan
- Josette Jorge
- Victor Jory
- Amanda Joy
- Hélène Joy
- Robert Joy
- Demetrius Joyette
- Akiel Julien
- Tina Jung
[top]

== K ==
- Emmanuel Kabongo
- Richard Kahan
- Brenda Kamino
- Aliya Kanani
- Michael Kane
- Stan Kane
- John Kapelos
- Theresia Kappianaq
- Vinnie Karetak
- Ramin Karimloo
- Athena Karkanis
- Erin Karpluk
- Sabine Karsenti
- Sofia Karstens
- Alex Karzis
- Daniel Kash
- Linda Kash
- Daphna Kastner
- Peter Kastner
- Stana Katic
- Judah Katz
- Parveen Kaur
- Ingrid Kavelaars
- David Kaye
- Marlon Kazadi
- Greg Kean
- Kerrie Keane
- Trenna Keating
- Ruby Keeler
- Eric Keenleyside
- Tina Keeper
- Jared Keeso
- Peter Kelamis
- Peter Keleghan
- Joel Keller
- Joanne Kelly
- Justin Kelly
- Morgan Kelly
- Terence Kelly
- Kate Kelton
- Cameron Kennedy
- Jessica Parker Kennedy
- Barbara Kent
- Susan Kent
- Roxanne Kernohan
- Steven Kerzner
- Martin Kevan
- Armeena Khan
- Julie Khaner
- Arsinée Khanjian
- Janet Kidder
- Margot Kidder
- Gail Kim
- Deborah Kimmett
- Dani Kind
- Charmion King
- Helen King
- Vanessa King
- Dylan Kingwell
- Shane Kippel
- Luke Kirby
- Mia Kirshner
- Taylor Kitsch
- Diego Klattenhoff
- Joey Klein
- Pom Klementieff
- Jett Klyne
- Tom Kneebone
- Keith Knight
- Matthew Knight
- Ann Knox
- Erik Knudsen
- Mpho Koaho
- Sarah Kolasky
- Shannon Kook
- Asivak Koostachin
- Tinsel Korey
- Adam Korson
- Corrine Koslo
- Elias Koteas
- Hattie Kragten
- Isaac Kragten
- Greg Kramer
- Anthony Kramreither
- Kristin Kreuk
- Natalie Krill
- Daniel Krolik
- Kelly Kruger
- Akshay Kumar
- Grace Lynn Kung
- Carol Kunnuk
- Andrew Kushnir
- Mimi Kuzyk
- Paloma Kwiatkowski
- Miranda Kwok
- Sonija Kwok
- Sean Michael Kyer
- Harlan Blayne Kytwayhat
[top]

== L ==
- Rosa Labordé
- John Labow
- Léane Labrèche-Dor
- Sarah-Jeanne Labrosse
- Raphaël Lacaille
- Andrée Lachapelle
- Lisa LaCroix
- Simon Lacroix
- Sarah Lafleur
- Whitney Lafleur
- David Lafontaine
- Jacinthe Laguë
- Christie Laing
- Jon Lajoie
- Amy Lalonde
- Maurice LaMarche
- Anna Lambe
- Guillaume Lambert
- Lisa Lambert
- Heath Lamberts
- Tina Lameman
- Willie Lamothe
- Micheline Lanctôt
- Alexandre Landry
- Jonathan Langdon
- Lisa Langlois
- Margaret Langrick
- Murray Langston
- Robert Lantos
- Denis Lapalme
- Steve Laplante
- Jean Lapointe
- Stéphanie Lapointe
- Pauline Lapointe
- Steph La Rochelle
- Philippe-Audrey Larrue-Saint-Jacques
- Jeremy Larter
- Kathleen Laskey
- Sarah Lassez
- Alexandrine Latendresse
- Michelle Latimer
- Carina Lau
- Carole Laure
- Marguerite Laurence
- Charlotte Laurier
- Lucie Laurier
- Christian Laurin
- Jani Lauzon
- Diane Lavallée
- Jesse LaVercombe
- Avril Lavigne
- Barbara Law
- Dave Lawrence
- Florence Lawrence
- Ruth Lawrence
- Carole Lazare
- Michael Lazarovitch
- Gabrielle Lazure
- Emily Lê
- Charlotte Le Bon
- Julie Le Breton
- Maxime Le Flaguais
- Véronique Le Flaguais
- Marie-Christine Lê-Huu
- Nicholas Lea
- Ron Lea
- Jennifer Leak
- Walter Learning
- Chris Leavins
- Aksel Leblanc
- Diana Leblanc
- Karen LeBlanc
- Laurence Leboeuf
- Brittany LeBorgne
- Marc-André Leclair
- Vincent Leclerc
- Antoine L'Écuyer
- Guy L'Écuyer
- Agathe Ledoux
- Jean-Simon Leduc
- Cory Lee
- Cosette Lee
- Louise Lee
- Paul Sun-Hyung Lee
- Ruta Lee
- Sook-Yin Lee
- Rachelle Lefevre
- Ashley Leggat
- Kristin Lehman
- Carla Lehmann
- Isaiah Lehtinen
- Melanie Leishman
- Megan Leitch
- Tyron Leitso
- Guillaume Lemay-Thivierge
- Kris Lemche
- Jasmine Lemée
- Julie Lemieux
- Anthony Lemke
- Vanessa Lengies
- Sylvia Lennick
- Sylvie Léonard
- Marie-Evelyne Lessard
- Anne Létourneau
- François Létourneau
- Elyse Levesque
- Jenny Levine
- Caissie Levy
- Dan Levy
- Eugene Levy
- Sarah Levy
- Shawn Levy
- Andrea Lewis
- Ben Lewis
- David Lewis
- Holly Lewis
- Phillip Lewitski
- Monique Leyrac
- Robin L'Houmeau
- Leanne Li
- Andrea Libman
- Landon Liboiron
- Rebecca Liddiard
- Ali Liebert
- Cody Lightning
- Crystle Lightning
- Georgina Lightning
- Marilyn Lightstone
- Beatrice Lillie
- Evangeline Lilly
- Macha Limonchik
- Sarah Lind
- Cec Linder
- Hardee T. Lineham
- Jaclyn Linetsky
- Art Linkletter
- Natalie Lisinska
- Mark Little
- Pauline Little
- Rich Little
- Nadia Litz
- Bernice Liu
- Simu Liu
- Suzanne Lloyd
- Mike Lobel
- Stephen Lobo
- Hannah Lochner
- Chris Locke
- Gene Lockhart
- Anne Marie Loder
- Fiona Loewi
- Donal Logue
- Éléonore Loiselle
- Hélène Loiselle
- Celine Lomez
- Marito Lopez
- Luisana Lopilato
- Sophie Lorain
- Quinn Lord
- Kayla Lorette
- Kevin Loring
- Alison Louder
- David Lovgren
- Crystal Lowe
- Jessica Lowndes
- Yvette Lu
- Jessica Lucas
- Michela Luci
- Ieva Lucs
- Alexander Ludwig
- Linlyn Lue
- Marla Lukofsky
- Jeff Lumby
- Steve Lund
- Tabitha Lupien
- Emmanuelle Lussier-Martinez
- Erica Luttrell
- Rachel Luttrell
- Heidi Lynch
- Kate Lynch
- Debbie Lynch-White
- Wendy Lyon
[top]

== M ==
- Adam MacDonald
- Allie MacDonald
- Ann-Marie MacDonald
- Austin MacDonald
- Mike MacDonald
- Norm Macdonald
- Shauna MacDonald
- Lee MacDougall
- Christie MacFadyen
- Luke Macfarlane
- Martha MacIsaac
- Mylène Mackay
- J. C. MacKenzie
- Billy MacLellan
- Bhreagh MacNeil
- Laine MacNeil
- Meredith MacNeill
- Peter MacNeill
- Melanie Morse MacQuarrie
- Husein Madhavji
- Adriana Maggs
- Michèle Magny
- Hassan Mahbouba
- Gilles Maheu
- Michael Mahonen
- Robert Maillet
- Anita Majumdar
- Shaun Majumder
- Chris Makepeace
- Jonathan Malen
- Keram Malicki-Sanchez
- Jane Mallett
- Fanny Mallette
- Greg Malone
- Barbara Mamabolo
- Howie Mandel
- Michael Mando
- Rizwan Manji
- Andrea Mann
- David Manners
- Sarah Manninen
- Bronwen Mantel
- Cheri Maracle
- Patricia Marceau
- Barbara March
- Mara Marini
- Gabrielle Marion-Rivard
- Brian Markinson
- Louise Marleau
- Marie-Noelle Marquis
- Alan Marriott
- Kristie Marsden
- Amber Marshall
- Dean Marshall
- Ruth Marshall
- Alexis Martin
- Andrea Martin
- Anne-Marie Martin
- Chris William Martin
- Flora Martínez
- Jorge Martinez Colorado
- Daniel Maslany
- Tatiana Maslany
- Raymond Massey
- Walter Massey
- Paul Massie
- Jean-Pierre Masson
- Mena Massoud
- Pat Mastroianni
- Diego Matamoros
- Kari Matchett
- Anik Matern
- Suleka Mathew
- Erin Mathews
- Hrothgar Mathews
- Cameron Mathison
- Katie Mattatall
- Martin Matte
- Sharron Matthews
- Trevor Matthews
- Amy Matysio
- Gail Maurice
- Blake Mawson
- Lois Maxwell
- Paul Maxwell
- Roberta Maxwell
- Joseph May
- Alberta Mayne
- Tawiah M'carthy
- Rachel McAdams
- Sera-Lys McArthur
- Bryn McAuley
- Maxwell McCabe-Lokos
- Tom McCamus
- Sean McCann
- Jay McCarrol
- Emilia McCarthy
- Nobu McCarthy
- Sheila McCarthy
- Steven McCarthy
- Kandyse McClure
- Clare McConnell
- Scott McCord
- Eric McCormack
- Kelly McCormack
- Bruce McCulloch
- Dean McDermott
- Kevin McDonald
- Miriam McDonald
- Ryan McDonald
- Heather McEwen
- Meredith McGeachie
- Paul McGillion
- Benoît McGinnis
- James McGowan
- Debra McGrath
- Derek McGrath
- Doug McGrath
- Jane McGregor
- Stacey McGunnigle
- Terry McGurrin
- Stephen McHattie
- Yanna McIntosh
- Melissa McIntyre
- Johanne McKay
- Don McKellar
- Patrick McKenna
- Seana McKenna
- Patricia McKenzie
- Britt McKillip
- Carly McKillip
- Sammy McKim
- Mark McKinney
- Casey McKinnon
- Megan McKinnon
- Brandon Jay McLaren
- Hollis McLaren
- Aloka McLean
- Mike McLeod
- Shelagh McLeod
- Allyn Ann McLerie
- Michael McManus
- Richard McMillan
- Michael McMurtry
- Mercedes McNab
- Marguerite McNeil
- Scott McNeil
- Kevin McNulty
- Mike McPhaden
- Andy McQueen
- Sarah McVie
- Caitlynne Medrek
- Mark Meer
- Isabelle Mejias
- André Melançon
- Wendel Meldrum
- Andrea Menard
- Julie Ménard
- Lysandre Ménard
- Gerry Mendicino
- Araya Mengesha
- Laura Mennell
- Micah Mensah-Jatoe
- Heather Menzies
- Evan Mercer
- Rick Mercer
- Monique Mercure
- Melanie Merkosky
- Marc Messier
- Mireille Métellus
- Belinda Metz
- Brendan Meyer
- Sydney Meyer
- Michelle Meyrink
- Darcy Michael
- Dominique Michel
- Lorne Michaels
- Manon Miclette
- Sasha Migliarese
- Leyla Milani
- Albert Millaire
- Andrew Miller
- Gabrielle Miller
- Jennifer Miller
- Monique Miller
- Peter Miller
- Rick Miller
- Sherry Miller
- Deanna Milligan
- Dustin Milligan
- Alan Mills
- Pat Mills
- Stephanie Anne Mills
- Claudette Mink
- Beau Mirchoff
- Stacie Mistysyn
- Atticus Mitchell
- Kenneth Mitchell
- Nathan Mitchell
- Shay Mitchell
- Colin Mochrie
- Melissa Molinaro
- Michelle Molineux
- Steven Cree Molison
- Merwin Mondesir
- Richard Monette
- Cory Monteith
- Belinda Montgomery
- Pascale Montpetit
- Sara Montpetit
- Andrew Moodie
- Tanya Moodie
- Jasmine Mooney
- Peter Mooney
- Ashleigh Aston Moore
- Corteon Moore
- Frank Moore
- Stephanie Moore
- Tedde Moore
- Tracey Moore
- Alice Moran
- Rick Moranis
- Sylvie Moreau
- Denise Morelle
- Alice Morel-Michaud
- Michelle Morgan
- Vanessa Morgan
- Wesley Morgan
- Stephanie Morgenstern
- Alanis Morissette
- Louis Morissette
- Andrea Morris
- Ishan Morris
- Libby Morris
- Kirby Morrow
- Max Morrow
- Rakhee Morzaria
- Scott Mosier
- Carrie-Anne Moss
- Jesse Moss
- Tegan Moss
- Joseph Motiki
- Kate Moyer
- Thamela Mpumlwana
- Al Mukadam
- Nicole Muñoz
- Lochlyn Munro
- Neil Munro
- Samantha Munro
- Gage Munroe
- Kathleen Munroe
- Lachlan Murdoch
- Bjanka Murgel
- Annie Murphy
- Dwain Murphy
- Michael Murphy
- Mathew Murray
- Sunday Muse
- Mike Myers
- Lubomir Mykytiuk
- Michelle Mylett
[top]

== N ==
- Alexandre Nachi
- Rupinder Nagra
- Tony Nappo
- Tony Nardi
- Robert Naylor
- Dylan Neal
- Carrie-Lynn Neales
- Louis Negin
- Natasha Negovanlis
- Reagan Dale Neis
- Isabelle Nélisse
- Sophie Nélisse
- Kate Nelligan
- Drew Nelson
- Travis Nelson
- Violet Nelson
- Pirouz Nemati
- Caroline Néron
- Émilien Néron
- John Neville
- Brooke Nevin
- Jacques Newashish
- Richard Newman
- Pauline Newstone
- Alisha Newton
- Omari Newton
- Mayko Nguyen
- Nguyen Thanh Tri
- Melanie Nicholls-King
- Leslie Nielsen
- Jesse Nilsson
- Andre Noble
- Eleanor Noble
- Michelle Nolden
- Patricia Nolin
- Julie Nolke
- Widemir Normil
- Marilyn Norry
- Rebecca Northan
- Alexander Nunez
- Paul Nutarariaq
- Diane Nyland
[top]

== O ==
- Brandon Oakes
- Annick Obonsawin
- Aliyah O'Brien
- Brenna O'Brien
- Mark O'Brien
- Kataem O'Connor
- Clairette Oddera
- Deborah Odell
- Joshua Odjick
- Noémie O'Farrell
- Steven Ogg
- Sandra Oh
- Catherine O'Hara
- Sonja O'Hara
- Enuka Okuma
- Thomas Antony Olajide
- Peter Oldring
- Britne Oldford
- Craig Olejnik
- Huguette Oligny
- Nicole Oliver
- America Olivo
- Taylor Olson
- Ty Olsson
- Melissa O'Neil
- Sean O'Neill
- Michael Ontkean
- Ndidi Onukwulu
- Anne Openshaw
- Joan Orenstein
- Corinne Orr
- Marina Orsini
- David Orth
- Meghan Ory
- Paul O'Sullivan
- Vincent-Guillaume Otis
- Oshim Ottawa
- Joel Oulette
- Peter Outerbridge
- Rabah Aït Ouyahia
- Chris Owens
- Patricia Owens
- Alex Ozerov
[top]

== P ==
- David Paetkau
- Elliot Page
- Mahée Paiement
- Christine Pak
- David Palffy
- Nancy Palk
- Candy Palmater
- Zoie Palmer
- Brooke Palsson
- Leah Panimera
- Giles Panton
- Melanie Papalia
- François Papineau
- Stéphane Paquette
- Anna Paquin
- Jivesh Parasram
- Henri Pardo
- Ron Pardo
- Frédérique Paré
- Jessica Paré
- Kevin Parent
- Caroline Park
- Grace Park
- Megan Park
- Cecilia Parker
- Leni Parker
- Molly Parker
- Noah Parker
- Gerard Parkes
- Graham Parkhurst
- Barbara Parkins
- Anie Pascale
- Reagan Pasternak
- Ellora Patnaik
- Dorothy Patrick
- Merritt Patterson
- Shirley Patterson
- Aislinn Paul
- Aleks Paunovic
- Alex Paxton-Beesley
- Dan Payne
- Nelofer Pazira
- Lucy Peacock
- Zoë Peak
- Valerie Pearson
- Krystin Pellerin
- Théodore Pellerin
- Andrée Pelletier
- Bronson Pelletier
- Denise Pelletier
- Wilma Pelly
- Madeleine Péloquin
- Chanelle Peloso
- Sladen Peltier
- Tahmoh Penikett
- Brendan Penny
- Rosalie Pépin
- Barry Pepper
- Missy Peregrym
- Emily Perkins
- Miklos Perlus
- Charles Antoine Perreault
- Rose-Marie Perreault
- Justin Peroff
- Matthew Perry
- Xavier Petermann
- Russell Peters
- David Petersen
- Luvia Petersen
- Eric Peterson
- Shelley Peterson
- Ben Petrie
- Doris Petrie
- Dan Petronijevic
- Joanna Pettet
- Stefanie von Pfetten
- Anastasia Phillips
- Autumn Phillips
- David J. Phillips
- Kathleen Phillips
- Patricia Phillips
- Andrew Phung
- Béatrice Picard
- Henri Picard
- Luc Picard
- Jack Pickford
- Lottie Pickford
- Mary Pickford
- Walter Pidgeon
- Frédéric Pierre
- Joseph Pierre
- Shailyn Pierre-Dixon
- Andrew Pifko
- Cara Pifko
- Sebastian Pigott
- Alison Pill
- Jacqueline Pillon
- Antoine Pilon
- Antoine Olivier Pilon
- Daniel Pilon
- Donald Pilon
- Claire Pimparé
- Joe Pingue
- Arnold Pinnock
- Gordon Pinsent
- Leah Pinsent
- Roddy Piper
- Tommie-Amber Pirie
- Jennifer Pisana
- Louise Pitre
- Erin Pitt
- Annabella Piugattuk
- Christopher Plummer
- Jennifer Podemski
- Sarah Podemski
- Tamara Podemski
- Kim Poirier
- Sarah Polley
- Alexander Pollock
- Sharon Pollock
- Léa Pool
- Aaron Poole
- Carly Pope
- Paul Popowich
- Louise Portal
- MacKenzie Porter
- Ellie Posadas
- Christian Potenza
- Chris Potter
- Brigitte Poupart
- Nicole Power
- Paul David Power
- Sarah Power
- Victoria Pratt
- Gregory Prest
- Cynthia Preston
- Marie Prevost
- Connor Price
- Jason Priestley
- Ramona Pringle
- Jenn Proske
- Cristine Prosperi
- Brooklynn Proulx
- Danielle Proulx
- Émile Proulx-Cloutier
- Kirsten Prout
- Karl Pruner
- John Pyper-Ferguson
[top]

== Q ==
- David Qamaniq
- Zorga Qaunaq
- John Qualen
- Iain Quarrier
- Chantal Quesnel
- Dominique Quesnel
- Alexandra Quinn
- William Quinn
[top]

== R ==
- Pamela Rabe
- Paul Rabliauskas
- Rosemary Radcliffe
- Barbara Radecki
- Natalie Radford
- Douglas Rain
- Justin Rain
- Nabil Rajo
- Christopher Ralph
- John Ralston
- Maitreyi Ramakrishnan
- Henry Ramer
- Gord Rand
- Claire Rankin
- Jeremy Ratchford
- Meaghan Rath
- Benjamin Ratner
- Lisa Ray
- Brittany Raymond
- Jennie Raymond
- Aaron Read
- Barbara Read
- David Reale
- John Reardon
- Duke Redbird
- Dan Redican
- Sarah-Jane Redmond
- Keanu Reeves
- Sophia Reid-Gantzert
- Laura Regan
- Tanja Reichert
- Adam Reid
- Fiona Reid
- Kate Reid
- Noah Reid
- Georgina Reilly
- Gary Reineke
- Winston Rekert
- Mark Rendall
- Callum Keith Rennie
- Colleen Rennison
- Ginette Reno
- Liisa Repo-Martell
- Jodie Resther
- Gloria Reuben
- Michael Reventar
- Jillian Reynolds
- Ryan Reynolds
- Caroline Rhea
- Francis-William Rhéaume
- Donnelly Rhodes
- Sébastien Ricard
- Italia Ricci
- Nahéma Ricci
- Alex Rice
- Billie Mae Richards
- Jasmine Richards
- Jackie Richardson
- Guy Richer
- Isabel Richer
- Julian Richings
- David Richmond-Peck
- Emily Bett Rickards
- Cara Ricketts
- Kyle Rideout
- Juan Riedinger
- Michael Riley
- Shane Rimmer
- Juno Rinaldi
- Maya Ritter
- Martin Roach
- Patrick Roach
- Ryan Robbins
- Michael Roberds
- Denise Robert
- Rick Roberts
- Shawn Roberts
- Françoise Robertson
- George R. Robertson
- Jennifer Robertson
- Kathleen Robertson
- Nancy Robertson
- Louise Robey
- Joakim Robillard
- Toby Robins
- Chris Robinson
- Karen Robinson
- Pierrette Robitaille
- Wayne Robson
- Debbie Rochon
- Seth Rogen
- Michael Rogers
- Kacey Rohl
- Sasha Roiz
- Susan Roman
- Évelyne Rompré
- Bobby Roode
- Cristina Rosato
- Tony Rosato
- Chloe Rose
- Gabrielle Rose
- Evany Rosen
- Michelle Rossignol
- Carlo Rota
- Andrea Roth
- Teryl Rothery
- Andrew Rotilio
- Anna Mae Routledge
- Jean-Louis Roux
- Kelly Rowan
- Ronnie Rowe
- Melissa Roxburgh
- Anusree Roy
- Maxim Roy
- Lilou Roy-Lanouette
- Allan Royal
- Tim Rozon
- Mary Beth Rubens
- Jan Rubeš
- Susan Douglas Rubeš
- Les Rubie
- Ron Rubin
- Saul Rubinek
- Michael Rudder
- Francine Ruel
- Adamo Ruggiero
- Kurt Max Runte
- Craig Russell
- Taylor Russell
- Kudakwashe Rutendo
- Ann Rutherford
- Rusty Ryan
- Tracy Ryan
- Lisa Ryder
[top]

== S ==
- Andrew Sabiston
- Marcel Sabourin
- Vik Sahay
- Ed Sahely
- Jason St. Amour
- Tabitha St. Germain
- Michelle St. John
- Hugo St-Cyr
- Chloé Sainte-Marie
- Catherine St-Laurent
- Nancy Anne Sakovich
- Rosa Salazar
- Jess Salgueiro
- Sonya Salomaa
- Ève Salvail
- Eliza Sam
- Cindy Sampson
- Jacob Sampson
- Tony Sampson
- Victoria Sanchez
- Ecstasia Sanders
- Chris Sandiford
- Garwin Sanford
- Paolo Santalucia
- Zak Santiago
- Riza Santos
- Varun Saranga
- Inanna Sarkis
- Michael Sarrazin
- Will Sasso
- A.J. Saudin
- Tania Saulnier
- Jeremie Saunders
- Booth Savage
- Tyrone Savage
- Leela Savasta
- Paul Savoie
- Devon Sawa
- Joe Sawyer
- Michele Scarabelli
- Alan Scarfe
- Jonathan Scarfe
- Joe Scarpellino
- August Schellenberg
- Christina Schild
- Talia Schlanger
- Kyle Schmid
- Christina Schmidt
- Geneviève Schmidt
- Monika Schnarre
- Aliocha Schneider
- Émile Schneider
- Niels Schneider
- Tom Scholte
- Lisa Schrage
- Kim Schraner
- Pablo Schreiber
- Emmanuel Schwartz
- Albert Schultz
- Eric Schweig
- Caterina Scorsone
- Camilla Scott
- Melanie Scrofano
- Alison Sealy-Smith
- Michael Seater
- Noot Seear
- Drew Seeley
- Sagine Sémajuste
- Elena Semikina
- Nick Serino
- Corey Sevier
- Tommy Sexton
- Jeff Seymour
- Zaib Shaikh
- Kerry Shale
- Chuck Shamata
- Melinda Shankar
- Michael Shanks
- Polly Shannon
- Rekha Sharma
- William Shatner
- Andrew Shaver
- Helen Shaver
- Athole Shearer
- Norma Shearer
- Anthony Sherwood
- Gale Sherwood
- Madeleine Sherwood
- Erin Shields
- Anthony Shim
- Joanna Shimkus
- Sofia Shinas
- Aidan Shipley
- Nell Shipman
- Catherine Shirriff
- Martin Short
- Gilbert Sicotte
- Kris Siddiqi
- Sandy Sidhu
- Anna Silk
- Carmen Silvera
- Jay Silverheels
- Robert A. Silverman
- Chelan Simmons
- Shadia Simmons
- Hannah Simone
- Denis Simpson
- Karen Simpson
- Maxine Simpson
- Marc Singer
- Shawn Singleton
- Lilly Singh
- Pamela Mala Sinha
- Shaun Sipos
- Nancy Sivak
- Rachel Skarsten
- Tiera Skovbye
- Amy Sloan
- Alexis Smith
- Dainty Smith
- Douglas Smith
- Dylan Smith
- Gregory Smith
- Jaclyn A. Smith
- Kavan Smith
- Lauren Lee Smith
- Makyla Smith
- Mike Smith
- Robert Smith
- Steve Smith
- Trevor Smith
- Wendell Smith
- Sonja Smits
- Cobie Smulders
- Sarah Smyth
- Naomi Snieckus
- Victoria Snow
- Paul Soles
- Mani Soleymanlou
- Ksenia Solo
- Christine Solomon
- Brett Somers
- Steph Song
- Manoj Sood
- Linda Sorenson
- Linda Sorgini
- Catherine Souffront
- Ned Sparks
- Monique Spaziani
- Scott Speedman
- Jennifer Spence
- Paul Spence
- Peter Spence
- Sebastian Spence
- Tara Spencer-Nairn
- Tracy Spiridakos
- Greg Spottiswood
- Ruth Springford
- Brent Stait
- Jewel Staite
- Nicole Stamp
- Maruska Stankova
- John Stark
- Bernard Starlight
- Muriel Starr
- Peter Stebbings
- Cassie Steele
- Jessica Steen
- Rob Stefaniuk
- David Steinberg
- Janaya Stephens
- Amanda Stepto
- Robyn Stevan
- Diane Stevenett
- Cynthia Stevenson
- Alexandra Stewart
- Catherine Mary Stewart
- Julie Stewart
- Rob Stewart
- Tyler Stewart
- Tabitha St. Germain
- Ryan Stiles
- Nicole Stoffman
- Clare Stone
- Stuart Stone
- Waneta Storms
- Chantal Strand
- Sarah Strange
- Dorothy Stratten
- Tara Strong
- Katie Stuart
- Camille Sullivan
- Charlotte Sullivan
- Sean Sullivan
- Cree Summer
- Roseanne Supernault
- Rajiv Surendra
- David Sutcliffe
- Donald Sutherland
- Kiefer Sutherland
- Rossif Sutherland
- Janine Sutto
- Krista Sutton
- Serinda Swan
- Michelle Sweeney
- Jovanni Sy
- Jason Szwimer
[top]

== T ==
- Tymika Tafari
- Eva Tanguay
- Chase Tang
- Amanda Tapping
- Toby Tarnow
- Henry Tarvainen
- Dino Tavarone
- Carolyn Taylor
- Dylan Taylor
- Mark Taylor
- Sharon Taylor
- Tamara Taylor
- Emma Taylor-Isherwood
- Sally Taylor-Isherwood
- Jill Teed
- April Telek
- Tasya Teles
- Emily Tennant
- Jeff Teravainen
- Venus Terzo
- Madison Tevlin
- Guy Thauvette
- Deborah Theaker
- Marie-Jo Thério
- Michael Therriault
- Anthony Therrien
- Olivette Thibault
- Alan Thicke
- Dave Thomas
- Kwasi Thomas
- Greg Thomey
- Hugh Thompson
- Jody Thompson
- Marni Thompson
- Reece Thompson
- Sara Thompson
- Scott Thompson
- Shelley Thompson
- Kristen Thomson
- R.H. Thomson
- Alicia Thorgrimsson
- Alison Thornton
- Pat Thornton
- Linda Thorson
- Michelle Thrush
- Dov Tiefenbach
- Jacob Tierney
- Marie Tifo
- Sara Tilley
- Jennifer Tilly
- Meg Tilly
- Cali Timmins
- Kendra Timmins
- Farren Timoteo
- Robert Tinkler
- Brittany Tiplady
- Lee Tockar
- Kate Todd
- Jordan Todosey
- Vincent Tong
- Gordon Tootoosis
- Sara Topham
- Max Topplin
- Sarah Torgov
- Ingrid Torrance
- Jackie Torrens
- Jonathan Torrens
- Elias Toufexis
- Theresa Tova
- Ian Tracey
- Keegan Connor Tracy
- Mouna Traoré
- Sophie Traub
- Richard Travers
- Victor Andrés Trelles Turgeon
- Amaryllis Tremblay
- Emma Tremblay
- Fannie Tremblay
- Gabrielle Tremblay
- Ghyslain Tremblay
- Guylaine Tremblay
- Jacob Tremblay
- Johanne-Marie Tremblay
- John Paul Tremblay
- Karelle Tremblay
- Kay Tremblay
- Larry Tremblay
- Louriza Tronco
- Kate Trotter
- Catherine Trudeau
- Margaret Trudeau
- Yanic Truesdale
- Lucy Tulugarjuk
- James Tupper
- Carla Turcotte
- Andrina Turenne
- Bill Turnbull
- Frank C. Turner
- Kristopher Turner
- Kett Turton
- Shannon Tweed
- Terry Tweed
- Tracy Tweed
- Jud Tylor
- Barbara Tyson
[top]

== U ==
- Natar Ungalaaq
- Deborah Kara Unger
- Mia Uyeda
[top]

== V ==
- Arnaud Vachon
- Sonia Vachon
- Maria Vacratsis
- Maïla Valentir
- Billy Van
- Karine Vanasse
- Alan van Sprang
- Emily VanCamp
- Darla Vandenbossche
- Laura Vandervoort
- Vanity
- Jo Vannicola
- Nia Vardalos
- Sugith Varughese
- Tasha de Vasconcelos
- Emmanuelle Vaugier
- Nadine Van der Velde
- Aliza Vellani
- Ingrid Veninger
- John Vernon
- Kate Vernon
- Jean-Nicolas Verreault
- Kevin Vidal
- Asia Vieira
- Sonia Vigneault
- Lionel Villeneuve
- Sam Vincent
- Angela Vint
- Katya Virshilas
- Perrie Voss
- Julia Voth
- Vlasta Vrána
[top]

== W ==
- Michael Wade
- Rufus Wainwright
- Susan Walden
- May Waldron
- Andrew Walker
- Bill Walker
- Craig Walker
- Ratch Wallace
- Amanda Walsh
- Arthur Walsh
- Gwynyth Walsh
- Mary Walsh
- Adrian Walters
- Alisa Walton
- Douglas Walton
- Samantha Wan
- Jessalyn Wanlim
- Dave Ward
- Lyman Ward
- Ryan Ward
- Zack Ward
- Graham Wardle
- Estella Warren
- Dora Wasserman
- Morgan Waters
- Martin Watier
- Alberta Watson
- Bahia Watson
- Benjamin Charles Watson
- Jim Watson
- Lucile Watson
- Jonathan Watton
- Matt Watts
- Richard Waugh
- Al Waxman
- Aaron Webber
- Timothy Webber
- Hugh Webster
- Sandy Webster
- Torri Webster
- Victor Webster
- Lisa Wegner
- Samantha Weinstein
- Danny Wells
- Matt Wells
- Robb Wells
- Jonathan Welsh
- Kenneth Welsh
- Andrea Werhun
- Cathy Weseluck
- Chandra West
- Murray Westgate
- Diana Weston
- Steve Weston
- Jack Wetherall
- Jennifer Whalen
- John White
- Marjorie White
- Percy Hynes White
- Ron White
- Sherry White
- Trevor White
- Jacob Whiteduck-Lavoie
- Jonathan Whitesell
- Nigel Whitmey
- Connor Widdows
- Cainan Wiebe
- Chris Wiggins
- Mary Charlotte Wilcox
- John Wildman
- Peter Wildman
- Colm Wilkinson
- Gina Wilkinson
- Christine Willes
- Chad Willett
- David William
- Barbara Williams
- Don S. Williams
- Evan Williams
- Genelle Williams
- Hudson Williams
- Harland Williams
- Leighton Alexander Williams
- Marshall Williams
- Max Williams
- Nigel Shawn Williams
- Rebecca Williams
- Siobhan Williams
- Tonya Lee Williams
- Wes Williams
- Bree Williamson
- Kirsten Williamson
- Austin Willis
- Leueen Willoughby
- Mike Wilmot
- Linda Wilscam
- Blythe Wilson
- Dale Wilson
- Jonathan Wilson
- K. Trevor Wilson
- Marie Wilson
- Niamh Wilson
- Rachel Wilson
- Jeff Wincott
- Michael Wincott
- Katheryn Winnick
- Kathryn Winslow
- Maurice Dean Wint
- Robert Wisden
- Joseph Wiseman
- Stefan Wodoslawsky
- Jayli Wolf
- Mariloup Wolfe
- Finn Wolfhard
- Dominika Wolski
- Ellen Wong
- Jadyn Wong
- Grahame Wood
- Jacqueline MacInnes Wood
- Donald Woods
- Mark Kenneth Woods
- Fred Woodward
- Eric Woolfe
- Édouard Woolley
- Gordon Michael Woolvett
- Jaimz Woolvett
- Marc Worden
- Calum Worthy
- Supinder Wraich
- Fay Wray
- Catherine Wreford
- Alexsandra Wright
- Janet Wright
- Nicolas Wright
- Susan Wright
- Tracy Wright
- Cynthia Wu-Maheux
[top]

== Y ==
- Lisa Yamanaka
- Marline Yan
- Scott Yaphe
- Michael Yarmush
- Kim Yaroshevskaya
- Benny Yau
- Richard Yearwood
- David Yee
- Sally Yeh
- Noémie Yelle
- Norman Yeung
- Françoise Yip
- Jerome Yoo
- Jean Yoon
- Tyler York
- Mayumi Yoshida
- Aden Young
- Alan Young
- D'bi Young
- Jonathon Young
- Noreen Young
- Stephen Young
- Trudy Young
- Andrew Younghusband
- Hannan Younis
- Raugi Yu
- Catalina Yue
[top]

== Z ==
- Mary Lu Zahalan
- Alex Zahara
- Dominic Zamprogna
- Gema Zamprogna
- Lenore Zann
- Chiara Zanni
- Sylvia Zaradic
- Natty Zavitz
- Pete Zedlacher
- Emmanuelle Zeesman
- Kevin Zegers
- Michael Zelniker
- Kathryn Zenna
- Patricia Zentilli
- Joseph Ziegler
- Matt Zimmerman
- Tanner Zipchen
- Julie Zwillich
- Noam Zylberman
[top]

== See also ==
- List of Canadians
- Lists of actors
