= Jim Calarco =

Canadian drama instructor and actor

Jim Calarco is an actor and a media and drama instructor.

== Early life ==
Calarco's hometown is North Bay, Ontario.

== Career ==
=== Teaching and stage ===
He taught media and drama classes from 1969 to 2000. His career began when he was working as the Artistic Director of Caruso's Dinner Theatre in North Bay in 1981 and 1982. Claire and Jim Calarco formed Pine Creek Theatre Productions in 1983, producing independent freelance theatre. Calarco was a drama consultant with the Near North School Board of Education prior to retirement in 2000.

After retiring from teaching, Calarco focused his career exclusively on film and television.

=== Film and television ===
Calarco became a board member of Loon Film Productions and of Nipissing University's Nipissing Stage in 2007. He served as a member of the Theatrical Advisory Committee for Canadore College between 2008 and 2009. Calarco worked through various casting agencies to seek new talent within northern Ontario by promoting original, innovative film development as a spokesperson for the Show Us Your Shorts film competition. In 2008, he formed Real to Reel BG Agency with Kate Adams.

Calarco is a member of ACTRA and the Actors' Equity Association. His most recent works include A Dark Truth, The Riverbank (also known as Tracing Iris) and One Wish. One Wish won the Mexico City International Film Festival's Golden Palm Award and the Canada International Film Festival's Award of Excellence.

In 2010, Calarco established North Star Talent Agency with producer Brigitte Kingsley to better represent actors from northern Ontario. Within the same year he started Real to Reel BG Agency with Kate Adams. In 2011, Calarco started Castnorth, a film and television casting and audition agency.

Many of Calarco's latest movies have been available on Super Channel, including Dark Rising 1 and 2, A Dark Truth, High Chicago, The Riverbank and The Entitled.

North Bay Nugget was released in September 2013: "Calarco can now add the Northern Flicks Award — top honours in CTV Television Network Best in Shorts competition — to his list of awards from a film that put the spotlight on dementia and Alzheimer's."

== Awards ==
Calarco won the Quonta Best Actor award in 1973 and in 2008 was inducted into the Northern Ontario Entertainers Hall of Fame. Many of Calarco’s recent shorts have been nominated for awards, some as finalists, and his movies won many festival awards.

- 1973 How The Other Half Lives – Best Actor Quonta Festival - Frank
- 2007 That Was Easy – Best Screenplay from Music and Film in Motion Awards, Nomination and finalist from Music in Film and Motion Festival
- 2008 Inducted into the Northern Ontario Entertainers Hall of Fame
- 2011 The House - CTV Best In Shorts: Film North: Finalist, Mexico City International Film Festival: Silver Palm Award, ICFILMS (Milan): Top Twenty finalist
- 2012 One Wish — Mexico City International Film Festival: Golden Palm Award, Canada International Film Festival: Award of Excellence
- 2013 Strangers – Mexico City International Film Festival: Bronze Palm Award, Canada International Film Festival: Award of Excellence, Cinéfest Sudbury International Film Festival Northern Flicks Award and winner at The Rimini Italy Film Festival

== Personal life ==
Calarco and his wife Claire married in 1969.

== Filmography ==
Calarco has performed as an actor, producer, writer, director, casting director, musician and voiceover artist.

=== Acting ===
Year	Title	Format	Role	Note
1985	Street Smart		Waiter	
1988	No Angel		Mayor Ruttan	Caruso Production
1989–90	Moonlight Shadows	TV series	Jonah Rebus	Six episodes
1991	Ravens Peak		Edison Croft	
1992	The Scaganegy Man		Harrison	
1999	The Lost Patrol		Nick Delgenio	Pine Creek Production
2001	Picture Claire		Passenger on the train	
2001	Soul Food	TV series	Senior lawyer	2 episodes
2002	My Name Is Tanino		Mafia Don	
2002	Conviction		Parole Board Chairman James Calarco	
2003	Benchmark		Nick	
2003	Into The Sunset		Walt	
2005	Shania: A Life in Eight Albums		Tony Barna	
2006	That Beautiful Somewhere		Sergeant Mathis	Loon Films Inc
2006	"Left Behind"	Short	Joe	
2007	"That Was Easy"	Short	Man	Pair of Ducks Production
2008	"Push"	Short	Doctor Roberts	
2008–11	Météo+	TV series	Homeless Man #1 / Chairman / Commissioner	Charbonneau Production
2010	Medium Raw: Night of the Wolf	TV movie	News Reporter #1	Defiant Empire
2010	The Kids in the Hall: Death Comes to Town	TV miniseries	Townsperson #1	
2010	"It Started with Rabbits"	Short	Dr. Carlino	Pair of Ducks Production
2011	Citizen Gangster		Priest Nathan Molando	
2011	High Chicago		Frank Alfons	
2011	Dark Rising: The Savage Tales of Summer Vale	Video	The Priest	
2011	Dark Rising 2: Summer Strikes Back!	Video	The Priest	
2011	I'm Yours		Bus Station Attendant	Uncredited
2011	The Entitled		Detective	Uncredited; also Stand-in
2011	Running Mates		Garrettesville Mayor	Buck Productions
2011	"One Wish"	Short	Walter (Walt)	Last Best Hope Production
2011	"The House"	Short	Husband	Pair of Ducks Production
2012	"Boys Will Be Boys"	Short	Narrator	Voice over
2012	The Riverbank a.k.a. Tracing Iris		Mayor Jack Stubbs	The Film Works Inc.
2012	Les Bleus de Ramville	TV series	Dr. Egervari	Carte Blanche Production
2012	"Morning Zombies"	Short	Janitor	Film North Huntsville International Film Festival
2012	A Dark Truth a.k.a. The Truth		Robert	
2013	"Strangers"	Short	Bill	
2013	Hard Rock Medical	TV series	Jason Cahill	
2013	Be My Valentine	TV movie	Carney	as Jim Callarco
2014	The Captive		Manager	
2022	Essex County	TV series	Nursing home patient	
2023	Orah		Doctor	

=== Writer, producer and/or director ===
Year	Title	Format	Position
2007	"That Was Easy"	Short	Screenplay Writer, Producer
2011	"One Wish"	Short	Writer, Executive Producer, Director
2011	"The House"	Short	Writer, Producer, Director
2013	"Strangers"	Short	Writer, Executive Producer

=== Other crew ===
Year	Title	Format	Position	Notes
2006	That Beautiful Somewhere		Casting Associate, Unit Manager	
2007	"That Was Easy"	Short	Casting Director	
2011	Dark Rising		Background Casting Director	
2011	Dark Rising 2: Summer Strikes Back!	Video	Casting Director; Extras Casting; Unit Production Manager	
2011	I'm Yours		Extras Casting	
2012	The Riverbank		Northern Ontario Casting Associate	
2012	Still Mine		Extras Casting	
2013	Hard Rock Medical	TV series	Casting Associate	
2013	Dark Rising: Warrior of Worlds	TV series	Northern Casting	2 episodes: "Season's Change", "The Trankartak"
