= Derek Diorio =

Canadian writer, director, producer and actor

Derek Diorio is a Canadian writer, director, producer, and actor.

Diorio arrived in Ottawa from Montreal in the mid-'70s to attend Carleton University. Within four years, he had dropped out of Carleton, but had picked up an education at CKCU-FM, Carleton's campus radio station. It was at CKCU that he developed a desire to create and be part of the Ottawa entertainment scene. Between 1979 and 1999, he co-founded Sound Venture Productions, the Ottawa Improv League, the Skit Row comedy troupe, the Skit Row Comedy Club, The Creative Block, Diorio Production, and Distinct Features Inc. He started his career as an award-winning radio advertising copywriter and moved on to co-write with Dan Lalande and Rick Jones for a number of Ottawa-based television series and specials, You Can't Do That on Television, The Raccoons and Skit Row. In the '80s, he produced, performed, and promoted several live stage productions with Skit Row in both the Theatre and Studio of the National Arts Centre while simultaneously developing a corporate video business. In the nineties, he started directing television shows for the then-nascent Canadian specialty channels.

== Works ==
=== Writer ===
- You Can't Do That on Television (1982–1984)
- The Raccoons (1985–1988)
- The Adventures of Teddy Ruxpin (1987)
- The Railway Dragon (1988)
- The Teddy Bears' Picnic (1989)
- Kit & Kaboodle (1998)
- The Kiss of Debt (2000)
- The Quantum Tamers: Revealing our Weird and Wired Future (2009)
- Hard Rock Medical (2013-2017)

=== Director ===
- Two's a Mob (1998)
- The Kiss of Debt (2000)
- House of Luk (2001)
- Ottawa: Technically Funny (2001)
- Punch & Judy (2002)
- Francoeur (2003)
- Mann to Mann (2004)
- A Taste of Jupiter (2005)
- Meteo+ (2008-2011)
- Les Bleus de Ramville (2012-2013)
- Hard Rock Medical (2013-2017)
- Happy FKN Sunshine (2022)

=== Producer ===
- The Kiss of Debt (2000)
- House of Luk (2001)
- Ottawa: Technically Funny (2001)
- Punch & Judy (2002)
- Mann to Mann (2004)
- Getting Along Famously (2006)
- The Quantum Tamers: Revealing our Weird and Wired Future (2009)
- Fresh Meat (2012)
- Hard Rock Medical (2013-2017)
- The Fruit Machine (2018)

=== Actor ===
- The Raccoons (1985) - Haggis Lamborgini
- Babar and Father Christmas (1986) - Elderberry, Elf #2, Boatman
- Two's a Mob (1998) - Sonny Vendetta
- Ottawa: Technically Funny (2001) - Various
- Mann to Mann (2004) - Serge
- A Taste of Jupiter (2005) - Tony
- Lucky Days (2006) - Dean
