= Les Newbies =

Canadian television series

- Country of origin: Canada

Original release
- Network: Unis TV
- Release: 16 January 2019 – 10 June 2020

Les Newbies was a Canadian comedy television series that broadcast from 16 January 2019 to 10 June 2020 on Unis TV. The series, which followed the fictional life of three Acadian comedians, was also available on TV5 Monde and ICI TOU.TV.

== Synopsis ==
André, Luc et Christian are three friends who dream of becoming famous with their comedy group, Les Newbies (The Newbies or Beginners). In Moncton, they perform at local bars and community halls to try and launch their careers and hopefully one day achieve fame and recognition, and perhaps perform at Just for Laughs in Montreal. Their path to stardom is not as easy as they believe and through pitfalls, conflicts and disappointments, the Newbies (also a nickname for people from New Brunswick) may find that they may not be the success they thought they would be. Perhaps there is more balance to be found in their lives.

== Cast ==
Several Acadian and Quebecois actors and actresses had roles in the series.

- Christian Essiambre : Christian
- André Roy : André
- Luc LeBlanc : Luc
- Raphaëlle Lalande : Amélie
- Catherine Bérubé : Ann-Julie
- Marc Lamontagne : Lamont
- Roxane Gaudette-Loiseau : Karine
- Ricardo Trogi : Michel Lévesque
- Cloé Lévesque : Sophie
- Matthieu Girard : Jean-Marc
- Bianca Richard : Kim
- Karen Elkin : Valérie Babineau
- Denise Bouchard : Marcelle Robichaud
- Ryan Doucette : Réjean Picard
- Emmanuel Charest : Jean-Pierre Ducharme
- Karène Chiasson : Isabelle
- Raphaël Butler : Rick
- Robert Maillet : Bob
- Philippe Laprise : lui-même
- Dominic et Martin : eux-mêmes
- Valérie Blais : elle-même
- Yves P. Pelletier : lui-même
- Jean-Sébastien Lévesque : lui-même
- Michel Thériault : lui-même
- Lucie Laurier : elle-même
- Xavier Gould : Jass-Sainte
- Julien Dionne : Sean

== Le Grand Ménage des fêtes ==
Following the series two seasons, the group hosted an annual animated special called Le Grand Ménage des fêtes (English: The Great Holiday Cleanup). Intended for Francophone audiences in Canada, the hour-long special offers cleaning tips and a humorous look at the year's events, interspersed with sketches and musical performances.
