= The Five of Us =

2004 film by Ghyslaine Côté

- Elles étaient cinq
- Directed by: Ghyslaine Côté
- Written by: Chantal Cadieux; Ghyslaine Côté
- Produced by: Maxime Rémillard
- Starring: Jacinthe Laguë; Julie Deslauriers; Ingrid Falaise; Brigitte Lafleur; Noémie Yelle; Sylvain Carrier; Peter Miller
- Cinematography: Alexis Durand-Brault
- Music by: Normand Corbeil
- Production companies: Remstar Productions; Alliance Atlantis Vivafilm; Forum Films
- Distributed by: Remstar Distribution; Remstar Films
- Release date: August 26, 2007 (Montreal World Film Festival)
- Running time: 93 minutes
- Country: Canada
- Language: French
- Budget: $2.5 million
- Box office: $1.85 million

The Five of Us (French: Elles étaient cinq) is a Québécois drama film, distributed by Remstar Distribution and Remstar Films. The film was directed and co-written by Ghyslaine Côté, and stars Jacinthe Laguë, Julie Deslauriers, Ingrid Falaise, Brigitte Lafleur, and Noémie Yelle. It premiered at the Montreal World Film Festival on August 26, 2004, opened in theaters on August 27, 2004, and on DVD in February, 2005. The film follows four girls who strive to move on from the murder of their friend and the horrors of their past once they discover the man behind their trauma, Richard Thibodeau, is said to be granted conditional release from prison.

== Plot ==
Manon (Jacinthe Laguë), Anne (Julie Deslauriers), Isa (Ingrid Falaise), Claudie (Brigitte Lafleur), and Sophie (Noémie Yelle) are all childhood friends. Ever since they were children, they would spend time at Sophie's cottage in Montreal. The five girls, now at the age of 17, return to the cottage as they have permission from their parents to spend the weekend on their own. The girls plan to host a party during the absence of their parents. Manon and Sophie depart to pick up groceries in preparation of the party. They do not have access to a car, so they decide to hitchhike with a stranger. Manon quickly develops a romantic interest for the stranger, while Sophie remains suspicious of his behavior. The party has begun, but Manon and Sophie have yet to return. The girls are having a blast, while Anne is worried about the safety of Manon and Sophie. Eventually, Isa takes a rowboat out with a boy in hopes to get some privacy. As the rowboat approaches land, Isa discovers Manon in the forest, stabbed and covered in blood. Sophie is missing. The boy brings Manon to safety, while Isa runs off to find Sophie.

15 years have passed since the incident. Manon is working as an administrator for a large firm. She expresses no interest in staff outings, nor does she express romantic interests towards men. She also avoids taking the elevator with any men, hence being uncomfortable in private places with them. Stéphane (Sylvain Carrier) enters the scene and invites Manon on a date, to which Manon accepts on the condition of being in a public space. Manon also refuses him from staying at her place for the night. Several days pass, and Manon begins to develop an intimate relationship with Stéphane.

Manon drives into a car wash, and recognizes the stranger that was responsible for her traumatic experience. She experiences an anxiety attack, rushes home, and locks her doors. Several flashbacks reveal that Sophie was chained to a tree and covered in blood. Manon collects and reviews the court files only to discover that the parole board granted the stranger, Richard Thibodeau (Peter Miller), conditional release. Manon then takes her medication to reduce her anxiety. Stéphane arrives unexpectedly, and discovers the court files which Manon was reviewing. He confesses his love for her, but she does not reciprocate.

Manon visits Sophie's parents to discuss the parole board's decision. Sophie's mother admits that she had pardoned Thibodeau because she was exhausted, and wanted to move forward. However, Sophie's father and Manon were in disagreement of her decision.

Manon returns home and invites Anne, who is now a mother, to her condo. Manon reveals that she had asked Sophie's parents for permission to return to the cottage, which was granted. She makes the decision to invite all of the girls on a trip to the cottage in hopes to leave her experience in the past and move on from her trauma. At this time, Isa is a model in New York, and Claudie is a chef in Montreal. All the girls agree to accompany Manon to the cottage in hopes to confront their past.

A flashback reveals that Sophie and Isa were best friends, and that Sophie was supposed to join Isa in New York. The girls arrive at the cottage, and explore the area in silence. Back in Montreal, Stéphane studies the case files in the library and uncovers Manon's past. A flashback confirms that Thibodeau had raped, beaten, and stabbed Manon.

After the girls have a heated discussion on Thibodeau's release, Manon spots Isa on a rowboat returning to the crime scene. It is revealed that Isa had found Sophie's lifeless body, stabbed and chained to a tree. Thibodeau had forced Manon to witness him stab and rape Sophie. Manon couldn't handle the trauma and attempted to escape, which resulted in Thibodeau murdering Sophie as a consequence for her actions. Manon faces her fear, and pursues Isa. Anne and Claudie follow along. Once they arrive at the scene, they remain relatively silent.

Another day passes by, and the girls become more comfortable and accepting of their experiences. Anne, Claudie, and Isa return to Montreal and witness the parole board's decision on Thibodeau's release upon parole. Manon leaves a tape for Thibodeau, expressing her thoughts and feelings towards him and her freedom of the trauma. Manon returns to Stéphane, and becomes more accepting towards her romantic and sexual relationship with him.

== Cast ==
- Jacinthe Laguë as Manon:

A shy, mature, and passionate administrator working with a large firm. Manon contends with her trauma from the event that took place when she was 17 years of age.

- Julie Deslauriers as Anne:

An independent and a loving single mother of a young girl. As a result of the horrific experience from her youth, she is very protective of her child.

- Ingrid Falaise as Isa:

A former model working in New York City. Isa is reluctant to commit to a romantic relationship, as she lost faith in men. This is due to a man being responsible for the murder of her best friend.

- Brigitte Lafleur as Claudie:

A head chef in a Montreal restaurant. She is characterized as being humorous, promiscuous, and informal.

- Noémie Yelle as Sophie:

A young conscientious girl, and a talented pianist. She is portrayed as being the most favorable and enthusiastic member of the group.

- Sylvain Carrier as Stéphane:

A successful single father of a young girl. He is Manon's love interest in the film.

- Peter Miller as Richard Thibodeau:

The stranger responsible for the girls' traumatic experiences. He was incarcerated for the rape and aggravated assault of Manon, and the murder of Sophie.

== Release ==
The Five of Us premiered as the fest opener for the 2004 Montreal World Film Festival on August 26 in Montreal, Canada. The film opened as part of the fest's World Competition alongside La Fiancée syrienne, Around the Bend, Le chef du stationnement, and hundreds of other films.

== Reception ==
=== Box office ===
The Five of Us grossed $1.85 million from the United States and Canada, against a budget of $2.5 million. It grossed just over $161,000 from 11 Québec theaters by the end of its first week of release, averaging $14,639 per theater. It was also ranked as number two on the list of Canada's top five grossing films for its opening week.

=== Accolades ===
At the 2004 Montreal World Film Festival, The Five of Us won the prize for best artistic contribution (Ghyslaine Côté) and the prize for most popular Canadian film (Ghyslaine Côté). At the 2005 Jutra Awards, Brigitte Lafleur was tied for the best supporting actress award.
