= 12 Men of Christmas =

2009 television film directed by Arlene Sanford

- Promotional release poster
- Based on: Decent Exposure by Phillipa Ashley
- Screenplay by: Jon Maas
- Directed by: Arlene Sanford
- Starring: Kristin Chenoweth; Anna Chlumsky; Aaron Abrams; Peter Mooney
- Theme music composer: David Lawrence
- Country of origin: United States
- Original language: English

Production
- Producers: Lisa Demberg; Jon Maas
- Cinematography: Peter Benison
- Editor: Anita Brandt-Burgoyne
- Running time: 95 minutes
- Production companies: Lisa Demberg Productions; Fox Television Studios; Lifetime Television

Original release
- Network: Lifetime Television
- Release: December 5, 2009

12 Men of Christmas is a 2009 American romantic comedy television film made for the Lifetime Television network. Directed by Arlene Sanford and starring Kristin Chenoweth, the film is based on the novel Dating Mr. December by Phillipa Ashley with the teleplay adaptation written by Jon Maas. Anna Chlumsky, Aaron Abrams, Stephen Huszar, and Peter Mooney also star.

The film had its world premiere on Lifetime on December 5, 2009. The story takes place in Kalispell, Montana, United States, but the film was shot in Calgary, Alberta, Canada. It tells the story of a New York publicist who takes a job in a small town in Montana. The reference to 12 men in the title refers to members of the volunteer Kalispell Search and Rescue team who are the first point of rescue for those in danger at Glacier National Park.

== Plot ==
E.J. Baxter (Kristin Chenoweth) is a headstrong and popular New York City publicist. E.J. seemingly has the "perfect life"; a beautiful condo, a loving fiancé, a great job, and an excellent boss. But E.J.'s world takes a turn for the worse when she catches her fiancé Noah having an affair with her boss Lillah at the office Christmas party, resulting in E.J. breaking Lillah's expensive Gucci pump shoe, and breaking off her engagement with Noah.

Now, having no one to spend Christmas or New Year's with (except her sister's dog), E.J. starts to look for a new job, though with Lillah having black-balled her all over the city, E.J. has no one else to turn to except her boastful sister Roz. Feeling sympathy for her, Roz pushes E.J. to take up a job offer in Kalispell, Montana, to lure corporate retreats for a year.

Upon arriving, E.J. is extremely disappointed to find that her "job" is working at a Chamber of Commerce bureau with no secretaries or office, except her cheerful co-worker Jan Lucas (Anna Chlumsky). After a few days working together, Jan invites E.J. to the town's barbecue where they raise money for equipment for the Kalispell Search & Rescue team. To show respect, E.J. reluctantly goes and meets Dr. Marci Hempel and Eric, members of the search and rescue team. Marci tells E.J. that they raise money by holding various events, triathlons, pancake breakfasts, bake sales, etc. and if they don't raise enough money all of the tourists will go to more popular destinations such as Idaho or Aspen.

The day after the barbecue, E.J. drives over to former client Robert Lazaar's chalet to take photos to lure CEOs for corporate retreats. While there, E.J. runs into arrogant Will Abrecht (Josh Hopkins), a member of the rescue squad, swimming in Robert's pool. The two immediately get into an argument. The next day, Jan and E.J. receive leftovers of Kalispell's local calendar which Jan believes is boring because it shows everyday Montana scenery. Remembering a naked Will, E.J. holds a conference with the Search and Rescue team as a new means of funding their equipment. E.J. puts her media know-how to good use by telling them each man can pose half-naked for the calendar (hence the title). While the majority find it completely absurd, especially Will, Jason defends E.J. and starts a short-term relationship with her.

Right after the conference, Will comes by to rudely tell E.J. that it was a unanimous vote of no, not wanting to make a joke of the Rescue Squad. E.J. is determined, and starts one by one to convince every member of the rescue squad to pose. E.J. eventually becomes successful, even persuading Mayor Bob Baker, much to Will's dismay as he won't be needed because there are only twelve months but thirteen men on the squad.

But E.J.'s opinion about Will and vice versa soon change when E.J. is invited to an abseiling party and is goaded by Will to try abseiling for the first time. Halfway down, E.J. grips up, resulting in Will having to counsel her the rest of the way down. E.J. shyly thanks Will which finally grants Will enough courage to announce his feelings to E.J. saying that it's the most disgusting feeling he ever felt. E.J. is outraged and turns down his offer to sponsor the calendar, getting successful Chicago businesswoman Sonia Kendall to sponsor it instead, liking E.J.'s breath of fresh cynicism.

When everything seems to be going perfectly, Mike comes by to tell E.J. that he is completely nervous and that there's no possible way for him to be convinced to pose. Although, feeling a soft spot for E.J. Will volunteers instead resulting in Will and E.J. having an intimate relationship. Eventually, the calendar is successful as publicity and women surround Kalispell. Jason comes by to tell E.J that he found a new job and is relocating to Chicago with his boss and girlfriend Sonia Kendall. But when Will overhears Jan talking to Eric on how E.J. may be moving back to New York. E.J. and Will get into an argument as Will resents ever getting involved with E.J. This just causes E.J. to go back to New York earlier and re-accept her recently lost job with Lillah.

It is at New York that E.J. is reminded of Will and everyone she met back in Kalispell. During an important business conference E.J. receives an emergency call from Jan that Will is in Kalispell Regional Hospital with a possibly fatal injury after falling 50 feet from a mountain. Out of love E.J. immediately flies out to Kalispell Regional and is informed by a nurse that Will is gone. Believing that Will died he comes up behind her to tell her he forgot something as E.J. tells him so has she. The two then embrace and kiss passionately. E.J. ends up residing with Will and all of her newly made friends in the "hole in the ground" that is Montana.

== Cast ==
- Kristin Chenoweth as E.J. Baxter
- Josh Hopkins as Will Albrecht
- Anna Chlumsky as Jan Lucas
- Erin Dilly as Roz Baxter
- Stephen Huszar as Jason Farrar
- Heather Hanson as Lillah Sherwood
- Jefferson Brown as Eric
- Craig Eldridge as Mayor Bob Baker
- Chantal Perron as Dr. Marci Hempel
- Paul Constable as Dave Hempel
- Aaron Abrams as Les Pizula
- Frank Chiesurin as Scott Lewis
- Peter Mooney as Noah
- Jessie Pavelka as Henry Diepeveen

== Critical reception ==
Brian Lowry of Variety says the film has "no pretense of placing anything new in the audience's stockings" but is complimentary of star Chenoweth, saying "with the right talent, it's possible to make even the moldiest of material sing just a little". David Wiegand of the San Francisco Chronicle calls it "a pleasant way to spend a holiday evening in front of a crackling plasma screen". Tanner Stransky of Entertainment Weekly says "The only reason to watch this trivial holiday movie—with Kristin Chenoweth as an NYC bitch who finds herself after moving to Montana—is to gawk at Cougar Town's Josh Hopkins, who plays her love interest, often with a bare (and chiseled!) chest". Amy Amatangelo of the Boston Herald calls the plot "overwhelmingly simple" and "would have been better executed in a half-hour sitcom".

== See also ==
- List of Christmas films
