= First Snow (2012 film) =

2012 Canadian short film

- Film poster
- French: Première neige
- Directed by: Michaël Lalancette
- Written by: Yan Binsse; Guillaume Girard
- Produced by: Michaël Lalancette
- Starring: François Bernier; David Boutin; Karine Gonthier-Hyndman; Benoît Gouin; Louise Latraverse; Marie-Laurence Moreau; Noémie Yelle
- Cinematography: Ronald Plante
- Edited by: Élisabeth Tremblay
- Music by: Andrew Barr; Brad Barr
- Release date: March 16, 2012 (RCMS)
- Running time: 14 minutes
- Country: Canada
- Language: French

First Snow (French: Première neige) is a Canadian short drama film, directed by Michaël Lalancette and released in 2012. The film centres on a family of adult siblings whose father is in desperate need of a kidney transplant, and who are wrestling with the difficult decision of which one of them will be the donor.

The cast includes François Bernier, David Boutin, Karine Gonthier-Hyndman, Benoît Gouin, Louise Latraverse, Marie-Laurence Moreau and Noémie Yelle.

The film was a Canadian Screen Award nominee for Best Live Action Short Drama at the 1st Canadian Screen Awards.
