= Edith Labbé =

Canadian cinematographer

Edith Labbé is a Canadian cinematographer from Quebec. She is most noted for her work on the film 1+1+1 Life, Love, Chaos (1+1+1 La vie, l'amour, le chaos), for which she received a Canadian Screen Award nomination for Best Cinematography at the 14th Canadian Screen Awards in 2026.

Her other credits have included the films Mommy Mommy, Reel Injun, Tia and Piujuq and Restless River.
