= Patricia Cano =

Peruvian Canadian singer and actress

Patricia Cano is a Peruvian Canadian singer and actress from Sudbury, Ontario, most noted for her musical theatre performances in the stage musicals of Tomson Highway. She graduated from the University of Toronto in Spanish Literature and Theatre.

Recording and performing a jazz-based style in English, French and Spanish, she has released two albums as a solo artist, and won a Toronto Theatre Critics Award in 2017 as Best Actress in a Musical for her performance in a production of Highway's The (Post) Mistress. She performed the songs from The (Post) Mistress on the album version, which was a shortlisted Juno Award nominee for Aboriginal Album of the Year (now known as Juno Award for Indigenous Artist or Group of the Year) at the Juno Awards of 2015.

She played a minor role in the television series Météo+, and her music has appeared in the television series Hard Rock Medical. Both series starred musician and actor Stéphane Paquette, who appeared as a duet vocalist on Cano's debut album This Is the New World.

In 2022 she performed the lead vocals on Cree Country, an album of original country songs written by Highway and produced by John Alcorn.

== Discography ==
- This is the New World (2009)
- The (Post) Mistress (2013)
- Madre Amiga Hermana (2017)
- Cree Country (2022)
