= The (Post) Mistress =

Musical play by Tomson Highway

The (Post) Mistress is a musical play by Tomson Highway. The play has also been staged in a French version titled Zesty Gopher s'est fait écraser par un frigo and a Cree version titled Kisageetin, although The (Post) Mistress, a predominantly English show which retains some French and Cree lyrics, is the most widely produced version.

Set in the 1960s, the show centres on Marie-Louise, a postmistress in the small Northern Ontario town of Lovely, on the rural outskirts of the larger city of Complexity. She possesses the supernatural ability to read through sealed envelopes, thus serving as a keeper of the town's stories and secrets, and the songs detail her revelations about life in the community. The city of Complexity is based on the Ontario city of Sudbury, while the town of Lovely is a pastiche of the city's suburban and outlying rural francophone communities such as Chelmsford, Azilda and Highway's own hometown of Noëlville.

Most productions of the show to date have starred Sudbury musician and actress Patricia Cano in the lead role, although some have also starred Pandora Topp or Martha Irving.

The play was published in book form by Talonbooks in 2013. A soundtrack album, with Cano performing the songs, was released in 2014, and garnered a Juno Award nomination for Aboriginal Album of the Year at the Juno Awards of 2015.

== Songs ==
1. "Taansi Nimiss" (5:06)
2. "Hey, Good-Lookin'" (3:40)
3. "Quand je danse" (5:08)
4. "Oh Little Bear" (5:26)
5. "Love I Know Is Here" (5:39)
6. "The Window" (5:37)
7. "When Last I Was in Buenos Aires, Argentina" (8:56)
8. "Some Say a Rose" (6:36)
9. "Mad to Love" (5:21)
10. "Have I Told You" (6:46)
11. "The Robins of Dawn" (7:34)
