= St. Nickel =

Canadian television comedy series

- Starring: Noémie Yelle; Isabelle Blais; Dany Boudreault; Roch Castonguay; Amber Goldfarb; Christian Laurin; Marie-Josée Colburn; Lisa Gagnon; Érika Fagagnolo; Simon Bérubé; Jean-Christophe Castel; Bertrand Cardozo; Simon D. Scott
- Country of origin: Canada
- No. of episodes: 6

Production
- Running time: 30 minutes
- Production company: Carte Blanche Films

Original release
- Network: Unis
- Release: May 24, 2016

St. Nickel is a Canadian television comedy series, which debuted on Unis on May 24, 2016. Produced by Carte Blanche Films, it is the first original scripted fiction series ever produced directly for the channel.

Set in Sudbury, Ontario, the series focuses on a dysfunctional Franco-Ontarian family who launch a campaign to protect their neighbourhood from an invasion of big box stores and other encroaching signs of gentrification, and unexpectedly find themselves thrust into the role of community leaders.

Production on the series began in fall 2015. The cast includes Noémie Yelle, Isabelle Blais, Dany Boudreault, Roch Castonguay, Amber Goldfarb, Christian Laurin, Lisa Gagnon, Érika Fagagnolo, Sagine Sémajuste, Simon Bérubé, Jean-Christophe Castel, Bertrand Cardozo, Marie-Josée Colburn and Simon D. Scott.
