= Francoeur =

Francoeur is a Canadian television series, first aired by TFO in 2003. It was the first Franco-Ontarian téléroman. The series has produced 44 episodes to date.

The series revolves around the Francoeurs, a Franco-Ontarian family in Eastern Ontario running a family farm. Written by Guy Boutin and directed by Derek Diorio, it was created and produced by Robert Charbonneau (who would later create TFO's first sitcom, Météo+).

The series has also aired on Télévision de Radio-Canada across the country.

== Cast ==
- Marc Bélanger as Luc Francoeur
- Guy Mignault as Bernard Francoeur
- Annie Lefebvre as Josée Francoeur
- Louise Nolan as Monique Francoeur
- Olivier L'Écuyer as Paul-André Francoeur
- Lina Blais as Sophie Pouliot
- Yan England as Joey Nadeau
- Jimmy Changue as Bernard Nadeau
- Kim Bubbs as Gabrielle Létourneau
- Roch Castonguay as Henri Létourneau
- Renaud Lacelle-Bourdon as Pascal Létourneau
- Karen Racicot as Bérengère Laliberté
- Eugénie Gaillard as Chloé Marchand
- François Grisé as Laurent Dorval
- Vincent Poirier as Guillaume Bérubé
- Colombe Demers as Karine Lorrain
- Raymond Accolas as Gilles Péloquin
- Maxime Cournoyer as Richard Lalonde
