= Cake (2005 film) =

- Directed by: Nisha Ganatra
- Written by: Tassie Cameron
- Produced by: Miranda de Pencier
- Starring: Heather Graham; David Sutcliffe; Sandra Oh; Cheryl Hines; Bruce Gray; Keram Malicki-Sánchez; Sarah Chalke; Taye Diggs
- Cinematography: Gregory Middleton
- Edited by: Mike Munn
- Music by: Andrew Lockington
- Distributed by: Lions Gate Entertainment
- Release date: 2 December 2005 (Canada)
- Running time: 94 minutes
- Country: Canada
- Language: English

Cake is a 2005 romantic comedy film directed by Nisha Ganatra. It was released on December 2, 2005 in Canada and is rated R for language and sexual content. It stars Heather Graham as Pippa, David Sutcliffe as Ian, and Taye Diggs as Hemingway.

== Plot ==
The film follows the life of Pippa McGee (Heather Graham) as she takes a giant step between the ages of 29 and 30, which involves growing up, becoming responsible, and discovering true love.

Pippa is a freelance travel writer who, after enjoying holidays in a Mexicanized Pamplona (Spain), comes home for a friend's wedding. She then finds herself running her father's wedding magazine while he recovers from a heart attack. Not only does Pippa have to run the magazine Wedding Bells, but she also has to save it from the chopping block. The future of the magazine is at risk as hungry vultures wait to take over her father's media conglomerate.

Pippa and her strait-laced father have never truly gotten along since her mother died. To complicate things, Pippa becomes involved in a love triangle with her father's right-hand man Ian (David Sutcliffe) and the free-spirited photographer Hemingway Jones (Taye Diggs).

The story is completed by a cast of token friends, Lulu (Sandra Oh), Jane (Sarah Chalke), and Rachel (Sabrina Grdevich) who provide Pippa with the moral support she needs to get the job done, both in her love life and in her editor job.

== Cast ==
- Heather Graham as Pippa McGee
- David Sutcliffe as Ian Grey
- Taye Diggs as Hemingway Jones
- Sandra Oh as Lulu
- Keram Malicki-Sanchez as Frank
- Cheryl Hines as Roxanne
- Bruce Gray as Malcolm McGee
- Sarah Chalke as Jane
- Sabrina Grdevich as Rachel
- Michael McMurtry as Luke
- Amy Price-Francis as Sasha
- Reagan Pasternak as Sydney
- Jefferson Brown as Clifford
- Suzanne Cyr as Suzanne
- Frank Chiesurin as Chad
- Dominic Cuzzocrea as Antique Dealer
- Billy Khoury as Diego
- Carlo Rota as Bob Jackman
- Kasia Vassos as Lane
- Martin Roach as Bartender
- Ron White as Jane's Father
- Jonathan Keltz as Valet

== Reception ==
Jen Johans of Film Intuition states that earlier in the film, the protagonist is a bit of an 'entitled princess', but once shifting her perception from viewing her as an airhead blonde stereotype to one of a Vince Vaughn style from Wedding Crashers, she becomes likeable once again. She believes the reason Graham seems so alienating in the film is because "Graham is playing a traditionally male role—a man who hates weddings aside from getting drunk and laid, someone who hates relationships that last longer than the initial few trysts that make one weak in the knees, a beatnik-like world traveler with a rich dad who has never worked a day in her life. Once this disconcerting character is identified, Grahams' usual liability sinks back in and we grow to enjoy watching her...". She goes on to say the film is cliché ridden, with likeable costars such as Sandra Oh.

Scott Weinberg of DVD Talk states "Cake is so conventionally sweet and airy that it could give diabetes to King Kong." He also believes it was adequately directed and blandly written, with inconsistent humour, and nothing an audience hasn't seen before. He gives the film 2 out of 5 stars on content, 3 and a half stars out of five on video, two and a half out of five for extras, and only one and a half on its replay ability.

David Nusair of Film Reviews gives the film two out of four stars. He states that "Cake is a cute but utterly inconsequential romantic comedy that benefits greatly from the uniformly charismatic performances, though the predictable trajectory of the storyline - coupled with a sense of humor that'd be more at home in a sitcom - cements the film's status as an instantly forgettable piece of work." He believes the film has a made-for-TV feeling to it, and feels the screenplay is a bit difficult to sit through.

John McKay of the Telegraph-Journal; Saint John, N.B. published his review on November 30, 2005. He appreciates the movie and its humour, as well as appreciating the fact that it is Canadian made and proud, referencing Toronto and its surrounding area. In his review, he states "Yes, it smacks of being a chick flick, one that flirts dangerously with conventional theories, that monogamy and marriage are good, and freedom from commitment is bad." Quoting Heather Graham, the film's star, on wedding pressure, she says there's a lot of societal pressure on women, while men get a pass. "Oh, it's the biggest thing in your life, who you are going to marry, you know? In some ways it is important, in other ways you feel like you want to rebel against it."
