= Frank Chiesurin =

Canadian film and television actor

Frank Chiesurin (born November 26 in Montreal, Quebec) is a Canadian film and television actor. He has had roles in a variety of American and Canadian productions, including the films Resident Evil: Apocalypse; 12 Men of Christmas; The Prize Winner of Defiance, Ohio; Lie with Me; Suits and Cake and the television series Big Wolf on Campus; Un gars, une fille; Doc; Largo Winch; Météo+; Les Bleus de Ramville and The Latest Buzz.

== Filmography ==
=== Film ===
Year	Title	Role	Notes
2004	Resident Evil: Apocalypse	Sniper	
2005	Lie with Me	Joel	
2005	The Prize Winner of Defiance, Ohio	Rock 'n Roll Singer	
2005	Cake	Chad	
2015	The Reconciler	Bill	
2017	Adam's Testament	Archangel Michael	
2018	A Murder of Innocence	Albert Anderson	

=== Television ===
Year	Title	Role	Notes
1999	Un gars, une fille	Superman	Episode: "Halloween"
2001	Dice	Officer Paul	6 episodes
2001, 2002	Doc	Francois	2 episodes
2002	Big Wolf on Campus	Devin	Episode: "N'Sipid"
2002	Federal Protection	Sid	Television film
2002	Queer as Folk	Bartender	Episode: "The Wedding"
2002	Trackers	Tony / Giusuppe / Cole	Episode: "A Made Guy"
2002	Witchblade	Charles Haley	Episode: "Ubique"
2002, 2003	Largo Winch	Brian Cole	2 episodes
2003	Odyssey 5	Gus Hagen	Episode: "Half-Life"
2003	Threshold	Bobby	Television film
2003	This Time Around	Zack	Television film
2003	Playmakers	David	4 episodes
2004	A Very Married Christmas	Fantasy Peter	Television film
2005	Sue Thomas: F.B.Eye	William Hackford	Episode: "Endings and Beginnings"
2005	Wild Card	Dr. Powers	Episode: "A Whisper from Zoe's Sister"
2006	Angela's Eyes	Ted Vincent	Episode: "Political Eyes"
2007	Instant Star	Drake McShane	Episode: "Lose Yourself"
2007	Love You to Death	Larry / Mr. Razzle	Episode: "The Clown Case"
2008	Da Kink in My Hair	Dane	Episode: "Speaky Spokey"
2008, 2010	The Latest Buzz	Mr. Jackson	2 episodes
2008–2011	Météo+	Tristan Patry	13 episodes
2009	12 Men of Christmas	Scott Lewis	Television film
2009	The Dealership	Willis	Television film
2011	Wandering Eye	Lucas Manning	Television film
2011	The Listener	Robert Ventone	Episode: "In His Sights"
2011	Air Crash Investigation	Peter Burkill	Episode: "The Heathrow Enigma"
2011	Flashpoint	Vince Albin	Episode: "Blue on Blue"
2012	The L.A. Complex	Handsome Lead Actor	Episode: "It's All About Who You Know"
2012	King	Mike Kaplan	Episode: "Justice Calvin Faulkner"
2012	Murdoch Mysteries	Seth Morgan	Episode: "Twentieth Century Murdoch"
2012–2013	Les Bleus de Ramville	Dave McNeil	28 episodes
2013	Beauty & the Beast	Slick	Episode: "Kidnapped"
2014	The Strain	Van Cop #1	Episode: "The Disappeared"
2015	Hard Rock Medical	Richard	6 episodes
2015	The Lizzie Borden Chronicles	Spencer Cavanaugh	3 episodes
2015	Suits	Will	2 episodes
2016–2017	The Girlfriend Experience	Greg / Chris Lannin	3 episodes
2017–2020	Amélie et Compagnie	Martin Archambault	33 episodes
2019	Impulse	Man #1	Episode: "Crossing the Threshold"
2021	Frankie Drake Mysteries	Commissioner Renforth	Episode: "Sweet Justice"
