= 1+1+1 Life, Love, Chaos =

2024 Canadian comedy-drama film directed by Yanie Dupont-Hébert

- French: 1+1+1 La vie, l'amour, le chaos
- Directed by: Yanie Dupont-Hébert
- Written by: Yanie Dupont-Hébert
- Based on: Roman de l'été by Grégory Lemay
- Produced by: Yanie Dupont-Hébert
- Starring: Noémie Yelle; Victor Andrés Trelles Turgeon; Irlande Côté
- Cinematography: Edith Labbé
- Edited by: Hubert Hayaud
- Music by: Laurence Nerbonne
- Production company: Ondine Productions
- Distributed by: Filmoption International
- Release date: September 29, 2024 (FCIAT)
- Running time: 106 minutes
- Country: Canada
- Language: French

1+1+1 Life, Love, Chaos (French: 1+1+1 La vie, l'amour, le chaos) is a Canadian comedy-drama film, directed by Yanie Dupont-Hébert and released in 2024. Based partially on Grégory Lemay's novel Roman de l'été, the film stars Noémie Yelle as Pat, a writer nearing 40 who is prone to self-sabotaging behaviour, who tries to salvage her relationships with her on-again off-again boyfriend Jan (Victor Andrés Trelles Turgeon) and her immature teenage daughter Flavie (Irlande Côté) by taking them to an isolated cabin in the woods for a week in the dead of winter so that they can actually learn how to live together.

The cast also includes Dany Lefebvre, Matai Stevens, Mathéo Piccinin, Jean-Francois Poirier, Karim Babin and Claudia Hurtubise in supporting roles.

The film premiered at the 2024 Abitibi-Témiscamingue International Film Festival, before going into commercial release in February 2025. It screened in competition at the Cinequest Film & Creativity Festival in 2025.

Edith Labbé received a Canadian Screen Award nomination for Best Cinematography at the 14th Canadian Screen Awards in 2026.
