= Jacinthe Laguë =

Canadian actress

Jacinthe Laguë is a Canadian actress from Montreal, Quebec. She is best known for her role in The Five of Us (Elles étaient cinq), for which she garnered a Genie Award nomination for Best Actress at the 25th Genie Awards.
