= TV5 Unis =

Canadian French-language television channel

- Country: Canada
- Broadcast area: National
- Headquarters: Montreal, Quebec

Programming
- Language: French
- Picture format: 1080i HDTV (downscaled to letterboxed 480i for the SDTV feed)

Ownership
- Owner: Le Consortium de télévision Québec Canada (Canadian Broadcasting Corporation; Télé-Québec; TFO; Association des producteurs de films et de télévision du Québec)
- Sister channels: TV5 Québec Canada

History
- Launched: September 1, 2014
- Former names: UnisTV (2014–2026)

Links
- Website: www.tv5unis.ca (in French)

TV5 Unis (formerly Unis, then UnisTV) is a Canadian French language specialty channel. The channel broadcasts general entertainment programming, with a particular focus on highlighting francophone communities outside Quebec.

The channel shares a broadcasting licence with its sister channel, TV5 Québec Canada (TV5), which focuses on international and Quebec Francophonie programming.

== History ==
In 2013, TV5 Québec Canada applied with the CRTC for an 9.1 (1)(h) order, seeking mandatory distribution on the lowest level of service by all television providers. As part of the application, TV5 Québec Canada also proposed that the service be split into two multiplex channels, consisting of "TV5 International", and "TV5 Interrégional"—a new channel with programming that would highlight French-speaking communities outside of Quebec.

The application was approved on August 8, 2013, by which time the Interrégional channel had been renamed "Unis"; the CRTC acknowledged that a channel focusing on Francophonie minority communities "would allow these communities to showcase their talents and culture while being able to see their lives, aspirations and achievements reflected to themselves on television". TV5 Québec Canada committed to airing 75% Canadian content on Unis.

Unis officially launched on September 1, 2014.

On 26 March 2026, the channel rebranded as TV5 Unis, as part of its adoption of TV5Monde's new brand identity.

== Programming ==
Programmes airing on the channel include Couleurs locales, a cultural newsmagazine series; Balade à Toronto, a music series showcasing live performances by francophone artists; Vu de l’intérieur, a documentary series on homes and interior design; J’habite ici, a documentary series showcasing towns and cities through the eyes of local francophone residents; Qu’est-ce qu’on sauve?, a series profiling people committed to protecting animals or safeguarding historical buildings in Ontario; Ma caravane au Canada; Canada plus grand que nature; 5e élément and Pense vite!.

In 2015, the channel announced that it had commissioned its first original dramatic series, St. Nickel. The series, filmed in Sudbury, Ontario by Carte Blanche Films, debuted on Unis in 2016.

In 2026 the channel premiered Surf Bay, côte ouest, the first Franco-Columbian scripted television series, and Cuisiner le Nord, a Franco-Yukonnais cooking show.
