= Stéphane Paquette =

Canadian actor and singer

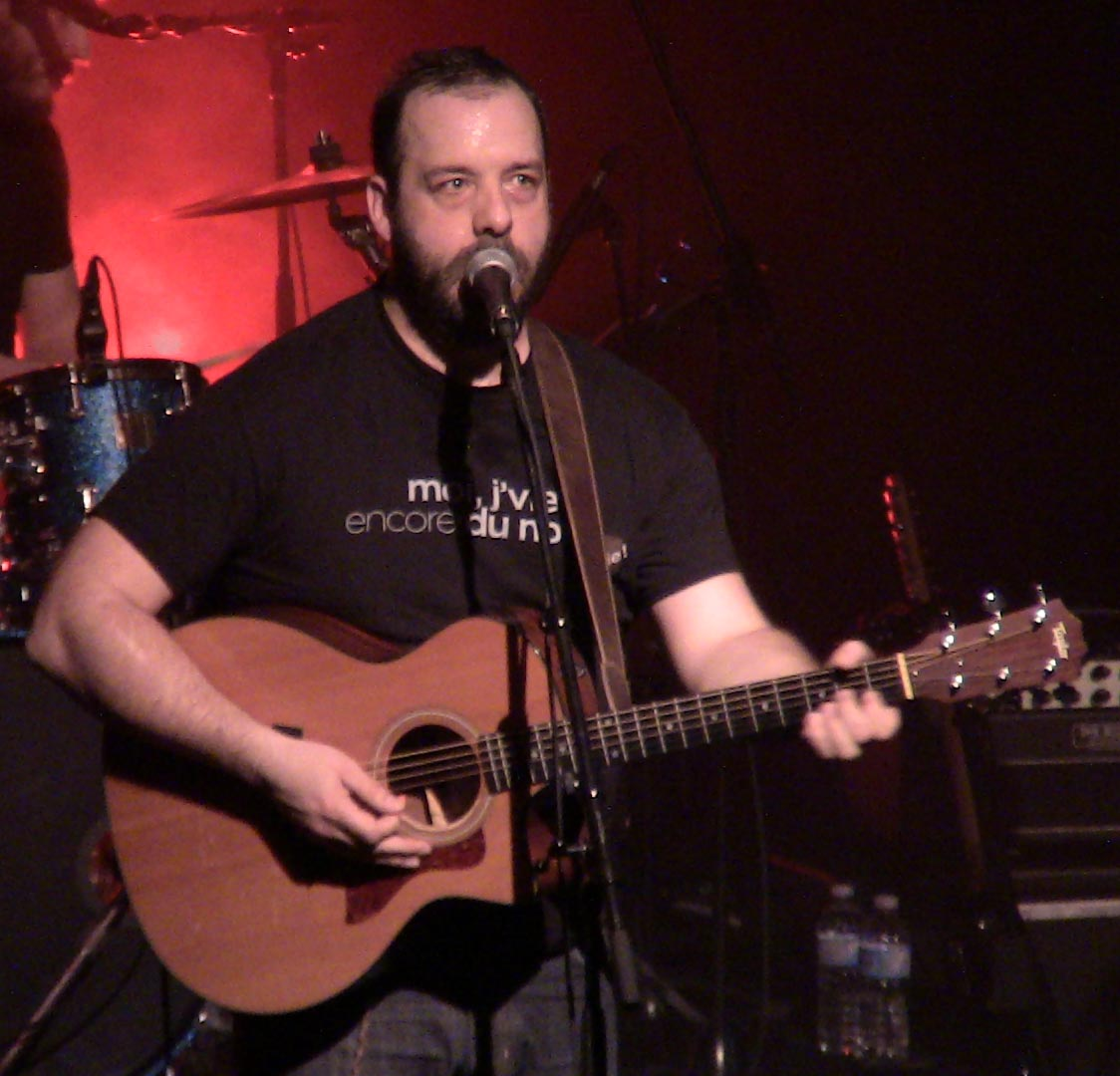
- Stéphane Paquette at French music festival La Nuit sur l'étang, in Sudbury

Background information
- Also known as: Stef
- Born: 18 December 1973 (age 52); Chelmsford, Ontario, Canada
- Occupations: Singer-songwriter, actor
- Years active: 1993–present
- Formerly of: Les Chaizes Muzikales
- Website: www.stefpaquette.ca

Stéphane "Stef" Paquette (born 18 December 1973., in Chelmsford, Ontario) is a Franco-Ontarian singer-songwriter, actor, and politician.

== Career ==
A founding member of the band Les Chaizes Muzikales in 1993, Paquette launched a solo career in 2002 with his first solo album, L'Homme exponentiel. His second solo album, Salut de l'arrière pays, was released in 2011 and won a number of awards, including the Prix Trille Or from the Association des professionels de la chanson et de la musique in 2013. In January 2014, he won five of the seven prizes at the annual Contact ontarois music competition, with his prize package including an extensive series of music festival bookings across Canada.

In 2009, he appeared on the debut album by Patricia Cano, as a duet vocalist on the track "Nada de nieve". In 2011, he participated as a supporting musician in a reunion tour by the rock band CANO.

In 2012, Paquette released a full-length album, Le Salut de l'arrière-pays that he composes with Normand Renaud. In 2015, he followed up with a three-song EP.

After a three-year hiatus in which cinema, television and other projects took a lot of space, Paquette launched the single "Plus belle que toé" in September 2018. Paquette has started to move into the country/bluegrass genre, frequently in collaboration with the Sudbury band Murder Murder.

Paquette is also known as an improv comedian and actor, whose television roles have included Météo+, Les Bleus de Ramville and Hard Rock Medical. Paquette is one of the three lead actors in the feature film Perspective.

In addition, he was also an afternoon host on CHYC-FM in Sudbury, and performed at a rally in Sudbury on 5 April 2009, to protest staff cutbacks at CBCS-FM, the city's CBC Radio One station.

In 2019, Paquette announced his candidacy in the New Democratic Party's nomination contest for Nickel Belt in the 2019 Canadian federal election. He won the nomination and stood second with 32.1% of the vote, 3,390 votes behind the incumbent Liberal MP Marc Serré.

== Electoral record ==
2019 Canadian federal election: Nickel Belt
Party	Candidate	Votes	%	±%	Expenditures
Liberal	Marc Serré	19,046	38.99	-3.81	$96,428.93
New Democratic	Stéphane Paquette	15,656	32.05	-5.73	$18,983.01
Conservative	Aino Laamanen	10,343	21.17	+4.43	$7,684.88
Green	Casey Lalonde	2,644	5.41	+2.93	none listed
People's	Mikko Paavola	1,159	2.37	–	none listed
Total valid votes/expense limit		48,848	99.39		
Total rejected ballots		298	0.61	+0.22	
Turnout		49,146	64.17	-2.94	
Eligible voters		76,585			
Liberal hold		Swing		+0.96	
Source: Elections Canada
