= Roch Castonguay =

Canadian film and television actor

Roch Castonguay is a Canadian film and television actor, who starred in the television shows Francoeur and sitcom Météo+.

== Early life ==
Castonguay is from Prescott and Russell Counties, Ontario.

In 1979, he founded the Théâtre de la Vieille 17, with Jean Marc Dalpé, Robert Bellefeuille, and Lise L. Roy.

In 2005, he performed Une Saison en enfer. In 2007, he appeared in L'homme invisible.

== Career ==
=== Theatre ===
- 1998 : L'été dernier à Golden Pond : ???
- ??? : The invisible man

=== Film ===
- 1989 - The Party (Le Party)
- 2001 - February 15, 1839 (Nouvelle-France)
- 2004 - Two Brothers
- 2022 - The Switch (La Switch)

=== Television series ===
- ???: Le Sorcier : ???
- 1999: Science Point Com : ???
- 2000: Fortier : ???
- 2003: Francoeur : Henri Letourneau
- 2007: Pointe-aux-chimères : ???
- 2008: Météo+ : Spare Change
- 2016: St. Nickel
