= Christian Laurin =

Canadian actor

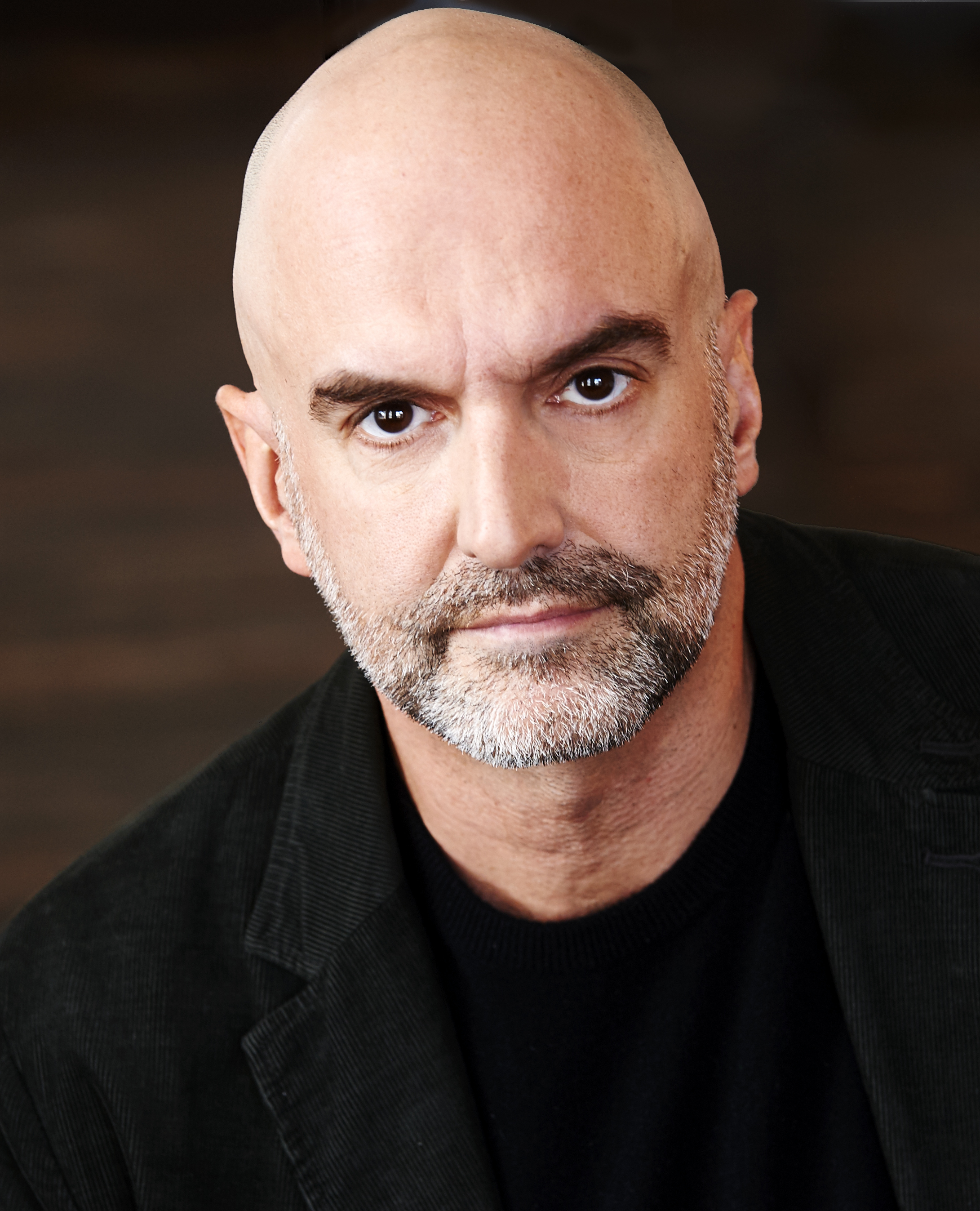
- Born: June 1, 1964 (age 62); Montreal, Quebec, Canada
- Education: Neighborhood Playhouse School of Theatre
- Occupation: Actor
- Years active: 1990–Present

Christian Laurin (born June 1, 1964) is a Canadian film, television and stage actor who performs in both English and French productions.

== Early life and education ==
Laurin was born in Montreal, Quebec, and raised in Toronto, Ontario. He received his training at the Neighborhood Playhouse school of theatre in New York City, where he was taught acting by the renowned Sanford Meisner.

== Career ==
Laurin has had numerous roles in a variety of American and Canadian productions including The Sopranos, Covert One: The Hades Factor, The Pacifier, Murdoch Mysteries and recurring or leading roles in the TV series Météo+, Les Bleus de Ramville, St. Nickel and Hard Rock Medical.

On stage he was seen in numerous theatre productions such as Michel Tremblay's "Yours Forever Marie-Lou", produced by Soulpepper Theatre Company, Melissa James Gibson's THIS, Yasmina Reza's "God of Carnage", Michel Tremblay's Fragments of Useless Lies, directed by Diana Leblanc, The Hollow at the Canadian Stage in the role of Drasiw, and in Molière's The Imaginary Invalid directed by Dean Gilmour. He also performs solo shows as Rutabagan, a bouffon-style clown.

== Personal life ==
He has also toured extensively across the United States and Europe with theatre companies such as Mump and Smoot in the production of Something Else with Zug, directed by Karen Hines, and also with Theatre Smith-Gilmour.

== Filmography ==
Christian Laurin film and television credits
Year	Title	Role	Notes	Ref.
1992	Secret Service	Eluard	1 episode	
1993	Counterstrike	Customs Official	Episode: "The Hit"	
1994	Road to Avonlea	Clement Paquette	1 episode	
1994	April One	Larose		
1994	Forever Knight	Daviau	1 episode	
1995	Rent-a-Kid	Pretentious Waiter	Television film	
1996	The Pathfinder	Capt. Sanglier	Television film	
1996	Goosebumps	First Pumpkin (voice)	1 episode	
1995	Heritage Minutes	Guard	Episode: "The Paris Crew"	
1997	Due South	Chef	1 episode	
2000	The Perfect Son	Walter	Theatrical film	
2005	The Pacifier	Marcel	Theatrical film	
2005	Terry	Quebec Policeman	Television film	
2006	Covert One: The Hades Factor	Dr. Marcel Jolivet	TV miniseries	
2006	Dogasaur	Barnard lippe'	Television short film	
2006	Angela's Eyes	Frenchie	1 episode	
2007	The Sopranos	Normand	1 episode	
2008	Victor	Surgeon	Television film	
2008–2011	Météo+	Gignac	7 episodes	
2011	Murdoch Mysteries: The Curse of the Lost Pharaohs	Sekmet	4 episodes	
2012	Warehouse 13	French Cab Driver	1 episode	
2012–2013	Les Bleus de Ramville	Mike Racette	28 episodes	
2013–2018	Hard Rock Medical	Dr. Raymond Dallaire	39 episodes	
2017	The Great Northern Candy Drop	Panicked Citizen (voice)	Television film	
2019	The Christmas Temp	Etienne Americe	Television film	
2020	A Killer in My Home	Oscar	Television film	
2023	Eaux Turbulentes	Lionel Chevalier	4 episodes	
2026	Back in Black	Pall bearer		
