= Noémie Yelle =

Canadian actress

Noémie Yelle (born April 15, 1983) is a Canadian actress from Montreal, Quebec.

She began her career as a child actress, with her first role in the television series Au nom du père et du fils. She first became widely known for her regular role as Annabelle Courval in the teen drama series Ramdam in the early 2000s. After the end of that series, she joined the cast of Virginie as Laurence Labonté in the 2009-10 season.

Her later roles included Léa in the web series Féminin/Féminin, for which she won an award for best foreign actress at the Roma Web Fest in 2015, a starring role as an exotic dancer turned community leader in the situation comedy St. Nickel, and the starring role of Pat in the comedy-drama film 1+1+1 Life, Love, Chaos (1+1+1 La vie, l'amour, le chaos), her first-ever leading role in a film.

== Filmography ==
=== Film ===
Year	Title	Role	Notes
1994	Desire in Motion (Mouvements du désir)	Mélanie	
2004	Hivernam	Charlotte	
2004	The Five of Us (Elles étaient cinq)	Sophie	
2004	Bittersweet Memories (Ma vie en cinémascope)	Young Alys Robi	
2005	Aurore	Véronique Caron	
2008	Cruising Bar 2	Fanny	
2012	First Snow (Première neige)	Deborah	
2013	Waterproof (Étanche)		
2014	The Rooster of St. Victor (Le Coq de St-Victor)	Mlle Anne	Voice role
2015	Trunk		
2017	Single (Seule)	Annie	
2021	The Guide to the Perfect Family (La Guide de la famille parfaite)	Mother #4	
2024	1+1+1 Life, Love, Chaos (1+1+1 La vie, l'amour, le chaos)	Pat	

=== Television ===
Year	Title	Role	Notes
1993	Au nom du père et du fils	Éloise Gadouas	
1993	Blanche	Louisa	One episode
1996	Lobby	Annette	One episode
1998	L'Ombre de l'épervier	Young Myriam Leblanc	One episode
2001-2008	Ramdam	Annabelle Courval	262 episodes
2004	Il était une fois dans le trouble	Anne	
2005	Les Ex	Karine Bélanger Fortin	
2006	Nos étés	Diane Landry	
2006	La Job	Valérie	
2006	Caméra Café	Sarah	
2008	Destinées	Nathalie Lussier	
2008	Les Kiki Tronic	Gritney Smears	
2009-10	Virginie	Laurence Labonté	
2014	Les Beaux Malaises	Chantal	
2014-2018	Féminin/Féminin	Léa	
2016	Au secours de Béatrice	Zoé Geoffroy	
2016	Unité 9	Nurse	
2016	St. Nickel	Nicole Martel	
2019	Les Bogues de la vie	Marie Novembre	
2020	District 31	Christine Poupart	
2021	L'Heure bleue	Marianne Deschamps	
2022	L'Effet secondaire	Jonathan's mother	
2023	Doute raisonnable	Camille Dupuis	
2023	Un gars, une fille		
2024	Lakay Nou	Police officer	One episode
