= Météo+ =

- Genre: sitcom
- Created by: Robert Marinier; Luc Thériault
- Starring: Martin Albert; Stéphane Paquette; René Lemieux; Guy Mignault; Micheline Marchildon; Lina Blais
- Country of origin: Canada
- No. of seasons: 4
- No. of episodes: 58

Production
- Executive producers: Robert Charbonneau and Tracy Legault
- Running time: 30 minutes

Original release
- Network: TFO
- Release: February 14, 2008 – April 28, 2011

Météo+ is a Canadian television sitcom which aired on TFO, the French language public broadcaster in Ontario, from February 14, 2008 to April 28, 2011. The series is about the colourful crew of Météo+, a fictional francophone weather channel for the Northeastern Ontario region based in Sudbury.

== Characters ==
- Bernard Vaillancourt (Martin Albert) is a newly divorced news producer from Sherbrooke, hired to oversee the channel and its staff. Not informed until his arrival in Sudbury that he's actually helming a weather channel, not a news channel, he is initially reluctant to take the job, but is eventually convinced. His culture shock at being in an unfamiliar city with its own political and cultural rivalries continues to influence his decisions. Thankfully, BM, the senior producer, is there to steer him in the right direction. His continued obsession with his ex-wife, Lara, whom he continues to have discussions with through an old photograph impedes on his ability to move on.
- Pierre Douglas Guérin (René Lemieux), the CEO of Météo+, is a businessman with delusions of being the next Ted Turner — even going so far as to adopt the nickname Ted instead of his own given names.
- Conrad (Conny) Fillion (Guy Mignault), the federal Member of Parliament for Moulin à Fleur, is a longtime friend of Guérin's who regularly pulls special favours from bureaucrats and government officials in Ottawa on behalf of Météo+, in order to establish his political legacy and earn himself a sinecure in the Senate. Self-serving, corrupt and possessed of a touch of megalomania, he is on his fourth wife, has lost count of his extramarital mistresses, and spends more time hanging out at Météo+ than he does in his role as a member of the Royal Commission on Official Languages.
- Béatrice-Marie Williams (Micheline Marchildon), nicknamed BM, is the network's ambitious and perfectionist but sometimes insecure senior producer. Having worked for Guérin for ten years, she continues to dream of her opportunity to move on to a more powerful and lucrative media job with Télé-Canada. She dislikes Bernard, whom she incorrectly assumes is a slick hotshot from Montreal, and is not above using sarcasm to put him in his place; over the course of the series, however, she and Bernard gradually develop a complex romantic tension which isn't eased by the fact that they're both in relationships with other people. She was initially offered Bernard's job, but turned it down because she didn't want to feel tied down. She had an unstable family life growing up, with a constant succession of stepparents entering and exiting her life because neither of her parents could sustain a relationship for very long. During the show's run, she gets romantically involved with Tristan.
- Mario Czhwaenski (Stéphane Paquette), the network's lead camera operator, is the fluently bilingual son of a Polish Canadian father and a Franco-Ontarian mother. A slightly rebellious but amiable young man in his first job out of college, he is always seen wearing his trademark Kangol cap and refers to most of his colleagues by nicknames such as Big Boss (Ted), Big Bern (Bernard), Beemer (BM) or Billie the Kid (Billie Jean).
- Gratien Desrosiers (Jean Pearson) is the network's bow-tied and occasionally tongue-tied lead anchor. Middle-aged and slightly neurotic, he is still under the thumb of his domineering mother Gratienne, getting flustered whenever she visits him at the studio or calls in to criticize his on-camera appearance, and resenting her refusal to tell him who his real father is. Usually, however, he's more composed and smooth on camera, as well as a quick thinker — but his standards of perfectionism may also be unrealistically high for the setting in which he finds himself.
- Billie Jean Caron (Chanda Legroulx), a reporter for the network and a former DJ at a country radio station, is a young woman who regularly includes anecdotes about her pet dog Fluffy in her weather reports. Gratien hates Billie Jean's perky hosting style and is constantly pressuring her to be more serious and sedate.
- Gisèle Mailloux (Lina Blais) is the network's receptionist, who manages to keep the office under control despite spending more time on the phone with her parents or her truck driver husband Gilles than she does actually working. She keeps a stash of cheese curds in her desk, which many of the staff — especially Mario — are constantly trying to get into. Although usually amiable and efficient, when she gets angry her temper can be utterly ferocious. In later seasons, she begins to work on air as a substitute anchor and host of a call-in show, eventually giving up the reception job for a full-time role as the station's third on-air anchor.
- Tristan Patry (Frank Chiesurin) is an independent management consultant who is initially contracted to host a team-building seminar, and becomes romantically involved with BM. A strict vegetarian and a follower of spiritual practices such as shamanism and meditation, his relationship with her is often strained by the conflict between his belief system and BM's more conventional ways.
- Spare Change (Roch Castonguay) is a mysterious homeless man who lives in the alleyway behind Météo+'s office. Nicknamed "Spare Change" because nobody knows his real name, he is extremely wise and intelligent, and sometimes hints at having had a more successful career in the past which was derailed by a personal crisis he refuses to divulge. In the show's final season he fakes his death and re-emerges, more clean cut and well-dressed, as an applicant for the job of security guard at Météo+ — and is finally revealed as Dr. Bourgeois, a psychiatrist from Montreal who abandoned his former career after an existential crisis.
- Gratienne Desrosiers (Marie-Hélène Fontaine) is Gratien's domineering and flamboyant mother, who gave birth to him after a teenage affair with a visiting astronaut from Alabama. She is the president of the provincial Franco-Ontarian lobby group Fédération des organismes culturels de l’Ontario français, or FOCOF. She succeeds Conny as the local Member of Parliament after he finally gets his long-sought Senate appointment.
- Gignac (Christian Laurin) is a multidisciplinary artist who knows no boundaries to his artistic integrity. Pragmatic in nature, he understands that in order to make a living in his field, one must acquire the expertise necessary to obtain the financing available to artists; he eventually shocks everyone when he accepts a professional job as Conny Fillion's political assistant.
- Lara (Fanie Lavigne) is Bernard's ex-wife. She appears primarily as a talking photograph, a dramatic device used to illustrate Bernard's own internal dialogue and turmoil around the recent breakup of his marriage. Most prominent in the first season, she appears less frequently in later seasons.
- Chantal L'Amour (Elyzabeth Walling) is the station's new receptionist in the show's final season, when Gisèle has transferred to a full-time role as an on-air personality. She also gradually becomes a love interest for Gratien despite his mother's harsh disapproval.

== Themes ==
The show is a comedic take on a genuine social and political issue. With almost 45,000 francophones living in the city, Sudbury has one of the largest francophone communities of any city in Canada outside of Quebec, and a further 133,000 live in the rest of Northeastern Ontario. Despite the fact that this community is significantly larger than some cities in Quebec which have their own television stations, the region has no locally oriented francophone television service — at the time of the series' production, the region only had rebroadcast transmitters of Radio-Canada's Toronto affiliate (CBLFT-DT) and TFO, and as a result, francophone viewers otherwise had to rely on cable television services based in Montreal. (Since the 2012 closure of Radio-Canada and TFO's transmitters in the region, all francophone television is limited to cable and satellite.) In coverage of the initial program announcement, Charbonneau stated that many francophones in Sudbury and Northeastern Ontario really do believe that Montreal-based services such as RDI (EastLink, the cable provider in Sudbury, does not carry MétéoMédia) frequently get even current local weather conditions wrong.

Proposals to improve media service to francophones living outside of Quebec have been presented to the CRTC by groups as diverse as the Francophone Assembly of Ontario, Astral Media, TFO, the Canadian Broadcasting Corporation and the Office of the Commissioner of Official Languages.

== Production history ==
The first sitcom ever produced for a primarily Franco-Ontarian audience, production on the series began in 2007 when producer Robert Charbonneau received a $2.5 million grant from the Northern Ontario Heritage Fund on June 15, 2007. It was expected to create up to 170 jobs in the Sudbury area.

The series was written by Robert Marinier and Luc Thériault, and produced by Les Productions R. Charbonneau and Carte Blanche Films. The series was filmed in a studio space in Sudbury's Rainbow Centre mall, which was the largest television studio in Ontario outside of Toronto, while external location shots place the fictional studio on Durham Street near the YMCA and the Sudbury Arena.

As the series aired on a non-commercial public television network, scenes were separated by brief interstitial shots of various locations throughout the city of Sudbury rather than by commercial breaks. In Seasons 2 and 3, each episode was also followed by a brief "Météo+ sur la route" segment, in which Chanda Legroulx, in character as Billie Jean Caron, presents a local interest report from a community in Northern Ontario; in the final season, each episode was followed by a brief interview segment featuring one of the cast or crew members.

Dennis Landry, the executive director of Music and Film in Motion, a local entertainment industry development agency in Sudbury, also cited Météo+ as a major coup which would provide a tremendous boost to the agency's efforts to build and sustain a film and television production industry in the city.

Mignault, Blais and Castonguay worked together in the earlier TFO series Francoeur, which was itself the first dramatic television series ever produced for a Franco-Ontarian audience. That series was also produced and created by Charbonneau.

Another French language sitcom revolving around a weather channel, Miss Météo, also launched in 2008 on the Quebec-based cable network Séries+.

The series' final season aired in winter 2011. Concurrently with the end of production on Météo+, Productions R. Charbonneau and Carte Blanche Films announced the launch of a second series, Les Bleus de Ramville, to be produced in Sudbury. Carte Blanche also later produced the English language series Hard Rock Medical in Sudbury. Stéphane Paquette was a cast member in all three series.
