= Hard Rock Medical =

- Genre: Medical drama
- Created by: Smith Corindia; Derek Diorio
- Written by: Smith Corindia; Derek Diorio; Kelly Lefever; Virginia Rankin
- Starring: Angela Asher; Rachelle Casseus; Mark Coles Smith; Tamara Duarte; Kyra Harper; Danielle Bourgon; Christian Laurin; Stéphane Paquette; Melissa Jane Shaw; Jamie Spilchuk; Andrea Menard; Patrick McKenna
- Country of origin: Canada
- Original language: English
- No. of seasons: 4
- No. of episodes: 39

Production
- Executive producers: Derek Diorio; Tracy Legault; Frank Taylor; Smith Corindia
- Production locations: Sudbury, Ontario; North Bay, Ontario
- Running time: 30 min.

Original release
- Network: TVOntario
- Release: June 9, 2013 – January 30, 2018

Hard Rock Medical is a Canadian medical drama television series which aired on TVOntario (TVO) from 2013 to 2018. It was the first original drama series for TVO, the public television network for Ontario. The series also aired nationally in Canada on APTN beginning in 2014. The series ended after a five-season run in 2018.

The series was filmed in Sudbury and North Bay, Ontario, and revolves around a group of medical students attending the fictional Boréal Medical School, loosely based on the real-life Northern Ontario School of Medicine.

Internationally, the series also aired on Australia's National Indigenous Television (a channel operated by the Australian Special Broadcasting Service) as of 2014.

== Cast ==
=== Main ===
- Angela Asher as Siebolski
- Jamie Spilchuk as Cameron Cahill
- Mark Coles Smith as Gary Frazier
- Melissa Jane Shaw as Melanie Truscott
- Stéphane Paquette as Charlie Rivière
- Andrea Menard as Eva Malone
- Tamara Duarte as Gina Russo
- Rachelle Casseus as Farida Farhisal

=== Regular ===
- Christian Laurin as Raymond Dallaire
- Patrick McKenna as Fraser Healy
- Danielle Bourgon as Dr Louise Helvi
- Kyra Harper as Julie Cardinal
- Eric Peterson as Dr. Kesler
- Jennifer Podemski as Bonnie

=== Guests ===
- Tony Briggs as Nick
- Jennifer Tocheri
- Marc Bendavid
- Michael Cleland
- Derek Miller
- Mike Bernier
- Jim Calarco as Jason Cahill
- Jeremy Cormier
- Megan Fahlenbock as Erica
- Ron Lea as Ray Teneli
- Jennifer Matthies
- Billy Merasty as Thompson Morris
- Atticus Mitchell as Caleb
- Greg Odjick
- Samantha Reed
- Sera-Lys McArthur as Amanda
- Julian Robino

== Premise ==
The series focuses primarily on a core group of eight medical students at Boréal Medical School: Nancy Siebolski (Angela Asher), Cameron Cahill (Jamie Spilchuk), Gary Frazier (Mark Coles Smith), Melanie Truscott (Melissa Jane Shaw), Charlie Rivière (Stéphane Paquette), Eva Malone (Andrea Menard), Gina Russo (Tamara Duarte) and Farida Farhisal (Rachelle Casseus).

The students are learning both a traditional medical curriculum, and how to cope with the unique demands of the school's focus on rural medicine, from professors and consultants including dean Raymond Dallaire (Christian Laurin), associate dean Fraser Healy (Patrick McKenna), doctor Louise Helvi (Danielle Bourgon) and First Nations elder Julie Cardinal (Kyra Harper). In the final season, Eric Peterson joined the cast as Dr. Kesler, the head of a medical clinic where some of the students are doing their practical placements; his unpredictable performance as a doctor leads the interns to suspect that he may be suffering from the early stages of dementia, although it is eventually revealed that he is struggling with a different issue.

Supporting and guest actors appearing over the course of the series include local performers from Sudbury and North Bay.

== Production ==
The series was initially a coproduction of three Canadian production firms, Title Entertainment, Carte Blanche Films, and Distinct Features, and an Australian firm, Moody Street Productions; the series was later produced solely by Distinct Features. In addition, the series received funding assistance from the Northern Ontario Heritage Fund.

First announced in 2011, production on the series began in 2012 and the series premiered on June 9, 2013, with a 13-episode first season.

TVOntario announced in February 2014 that it had greenlit a second season for the series, premiering February 15, 2015. In conjunction with the show's second season, Sudbury mayor Brian Bigger issued a civic proclamation declaring February 15, 2015 to be "Hard Rock Medical Day" in the city.

In the show's third season, consistent with the third year of a medical program marking the shift from classroom-based learning to practical internship placements, most filming took place on or near the Canadore College campus in North Bay. The show's third season premiered on January 8, 2017, releasing the season's nine episodes simultaneously online at the TVOntario website for the first time directly following the broadcast premiere. Filming also took place at Nipissing First Nation.

Music used in the series was performed almost entirely by local artists from the region, including Patricia Cano, Kevin Closs, Brian Dunn, Ox, Pistol George Warren, Kate Maki, Frederick Squire, Derek Dino White, Hidden Roots Collective, Tasheena Sarazin and Carden Cove. Students from Canadore College created short documentaries on the featured artists, which aired immediately following the episodes on TVO. The third season also featured North Bay producer Ben Leggett as the show's composer for all nine episodes.
