= Les Bleus de Ramville =

Canadian television series

Les Bleus de Ramville (The Blues of Ramville) is a Canadian television series, which premiered on TFO in January 2012.

Set in the fictional town of Ramville near North Bay, Ontario, the series focuses on Gordie, Julie, Maureen and Christian, four members of the fan club for the town's senior hockey team, the Radiateurs Dufresne.

Originally titled Fan Club, the series was first planned by Les Productions R. Charbonneau in 2008, with filming initially slated to take place in Hawkesbury. However, the series was delayed until 2011, and following the end of production on the series Météo+, Carte Blanche Films acquired the rights and chose to film the series in Sudbury. The show was filmed on location at various locations within the Greater Sudbury area.

The show's cast includes Stéphane Paquette, Renée Aubin, Christian Laurin, Chanda Legroulx, Sébastien Lajoie, Frank Chiesurin, Miriam Cusson, Michael Mando, Mathieu Landry and Joelle Villeneuve.
