= Mike Tyson's tattoos =

Tattoos of the American boxer

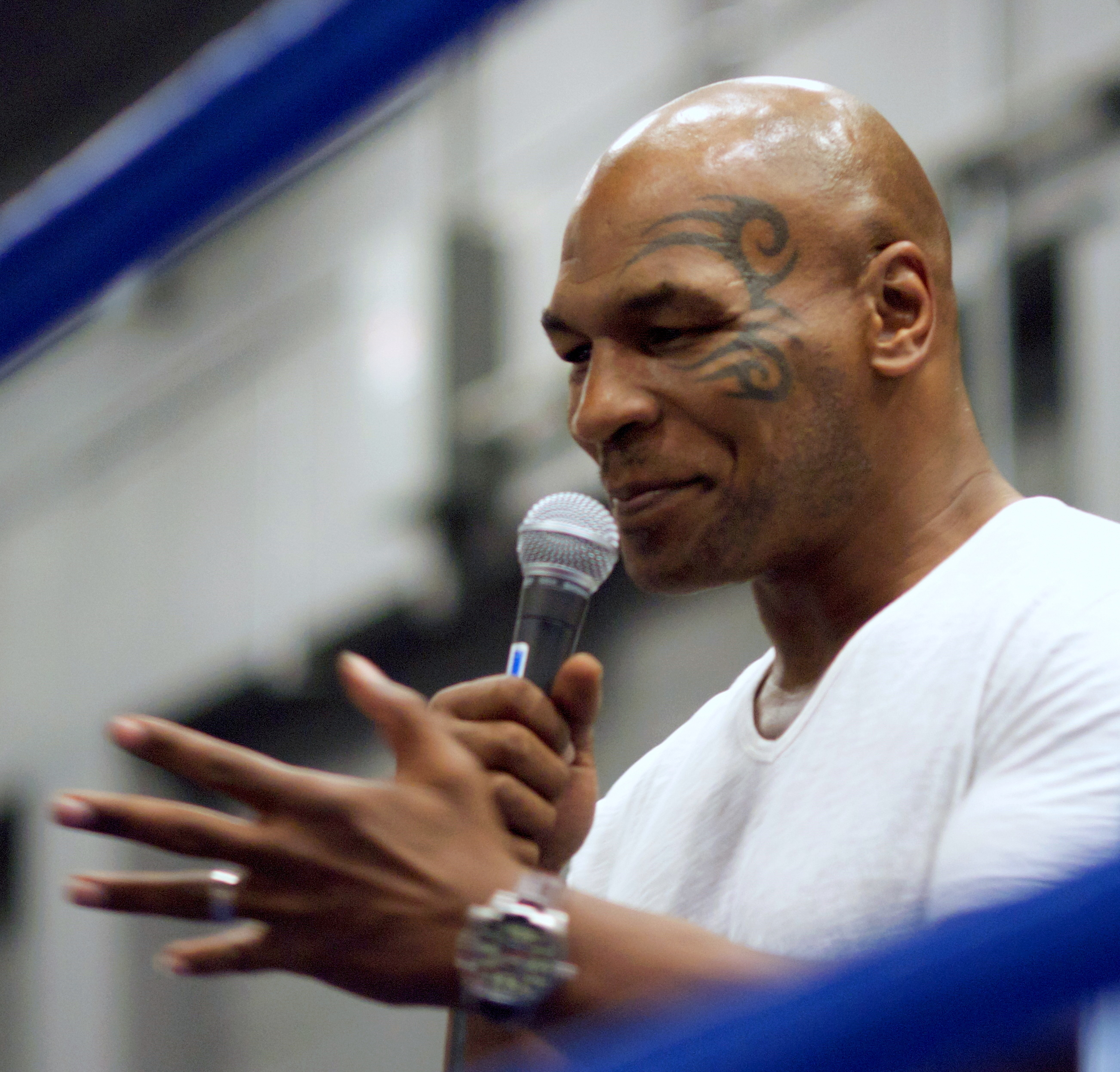
Tyson in 2011, with his face tattoo visible

The American boxer Mike Tyson has at least seven tattoos. Three—at least two of them prison tattoos (Note: In Tyson, Tyson says, "When I was in prison, I was so angry at society. I put a tattoo of Mao on me. I put a tattoo of Che on me. Because I just had no faith in our government." In A Savage Business (1998), Tyson's biographer Richard Hoffer affirms that the Mao tattoo (as well as the Ashe tattoo, not mentioned in Tyson) was inked in prison, but makes no mention of the Guevara tattoo. A January 1999 Associated Press article describes the Guevara tattoo as new at that time, but says the same about the tiger tattoo, which was inked no later than May 1997.)—are portraits of men he respects: tennis player Arthur Ashe, Marxist revolutionary Che Guevara, and Chinese communist leader Mao Zedong. Tyson's face tattoo, influenced by the Māori style tā moko, was designed and inked by S. Victor Whitmill in 2003; Tyson associates it with the Māori being warriors and has called it his "warrior tattoo", a name that has also been used in the news media. Tyson's three other tattoos depict a tiger, his ex-wife Monica Turner, and his late daughter Exodus.

Tyson's face tattoo quickly proved iconic and has become strongly associated with him. Its Māori influence has been controversial, spurring claims of cultural appropriation. In 2011, Whitmill filed a copyright suit against Warner Bros. for using the design on the character Stu Price in The Hangover Part II. Warner Bros. responded with a number of defenses, including that tattoos are not copyrightable; supporting them, scholar David Nimmer argued that it violated the Thirteenth Amendment to the United States Constitution—which prohibits slavery—to give Whitmill copyright over part of Tyson's body. After initial comments by Judge Catherine D. Perry denying an injunction but affirming that tattoos are copyrightable, Whitmill and Warner Bros. settled for undisclosed terms, without disruption to the release of the film.

The legal action renewed claims of cultural appropriation but also saw some Māori tā moko artists defend Whitmill. Legal scholars have highlighted how the case juxtaposes Māori and Anglo-American attitudes on ownership of images. Despite never making it to trial, the case has been widely discussed in the context of the copyrightability of tattoos, a matter which has never been fully resolved in the United States.

== Body tattoos ==
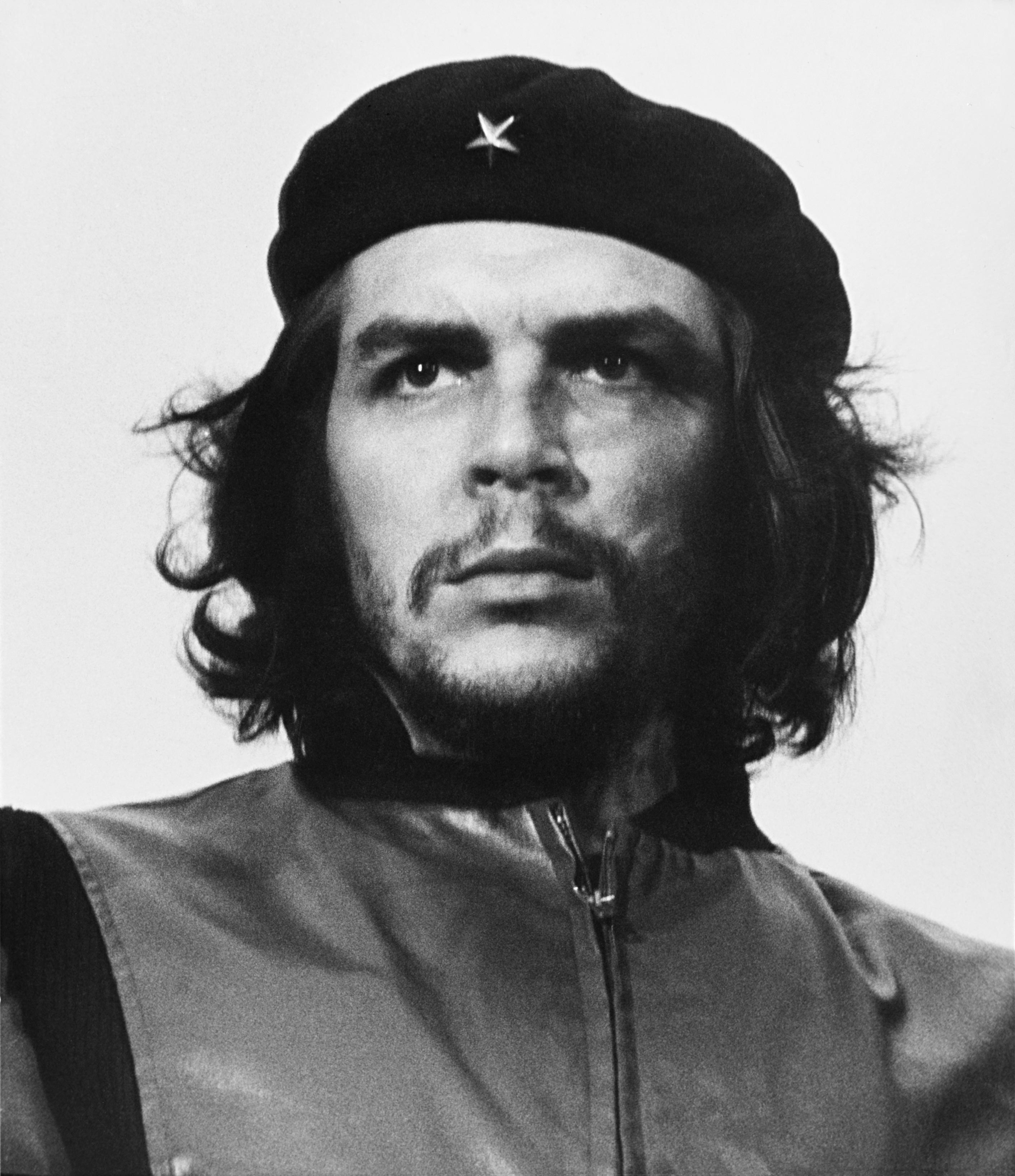
- Tyson's tattoo of Che Guevara is derived from the photograph Guerrillero Heroico by Alberto Korda.
- Ashe and Guevara tattoos
- Mao tattoo

From 1992 to 1995, while in prison for the rape of Desiree Washington, Tyson read a large number of books, including works by Chinese communist leader Mao Zedong. Spike Lee sent Tyson a copy of tennis player Arthur Ashe's deathbed memoir, Days of Grace. Tyson was moved by the book and respected Ashe's ability to be nonconfrontational and admired his political views and his success as a black athlete in a white-dominated world. Tyson got prison tattoos of both men on his biceps: A portrait of Mao, captioned with "Mao" in all-caps, on the right; a portrait of Ashe beneath the words "Days of Grace" on the left. Gerald Early views the Mao and Ashe tattoos as together "symboliz[ing] both [Tyson's] newfound self-control and his revision of black cool", with Mao representing strength and authority. Clifton Brown in The New York Times describes the Ashe tattoo as "a contradiction" with Tyson's "fits of rage". Early and biographer Richard Hoffer cast the two bicep tattoos as an unusual combination of "alternate icons".

Tyson chose tattoos of Mao and Marxist revolutionary Che Guevara to reflect his anger at society and the government while in prison. The Guevara tattoo, located on the left side of Tyson's abdomen, is derived from Alberto Korda's iconic Guerrillero Heroico photograph. In the 2008 documentary Tyson, Tyson brags that the tattoo predated the widespread commodification of Guevara's image. Tyson maintained positive views of both revolutionaries subsequently: In 1999 he described Guevara as "Someone who had so much but sacrificed it all for the benefit of other people." In 2006 he visited the Chairman Mao Memorial Hall and said that he "felt really insignificant" in the presence of Mao's body.

Tyson has three other tattoos, which have received relatively less attention: A tiger on his right forearm, a portrait of his ex-wife Monica Turner on his left forearm, and a portrait of his late daughter Exodus on his left breast. The Los Angeles Times in May 1997 described the tiger and Turner tattoos as new at that time; however, the Turner tattoo dates to August 1995 at the latest. The tattoo of Exodus was inked in 2023.

== Face tattoo ==
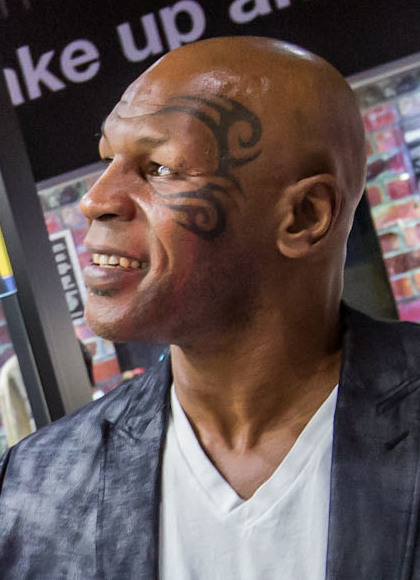
- Tyson's face tattoo, photographed in 2013
- Whitmill tattooing Tyson
- Tyson looking in the mirror

Tyson got his face tattoo from artist S. Victor Whitmill (Note: Tyson often refers to Whitmill as "Victor Paradox" or similar.) of Las Vegas, Nevada, shortly before Tyson's 2003 fight with Clifford Etienne (which would be his 50th and last victory), having previously suggested that he would get a face tattoo if he won Lennox Lewis vs. Mike Tyson. Tyson had originally wanted hearts (which he "just thought ... were cool"), but, according to Tyson, Whitmill refused and worked for a few days on a new design. Whitmill proposed a tribal design inspired by tā moko, (Note: Tā moko is the style of tattoo; the individual tattoos are called moko (both singular and plural).) a Māori tattoo style. The design is not based on any specific moko and was created directly on Tyson's face. Tyson saw the tattoo as representing the Māori, whom he described as a "warrior tribe", and approved of the design, which consists of monochrome spiral shapes above and below his left eye. According to Tyson, it was his idea to use two curved figures rather than one.

The tattoo drew significant attention before the fight. Tyson took time off of training to get it, which trainer Jeff Fenech would later say was a contributing factor to the fight being rescheduled by a week. Some questioned Tyson's physical and mental fitness to fight. Experts including dermatologist Robert A. Weiss expressed concerns about Tyson boxing while the tattoo healed; Etienne said that he would not go after the tattoo. (Tyson ultimately knocked out Etienne in under a minute.) The work—which Tyson and others have referred to as his "warrior tattoo"—was also met with criticism from the outset by Māori activists who saw it as cultural appropriation. In 2006, tā moko artist Mark Kopua in a statement to the Waitangi Tribunal called for "a law that would prevent a Mike Tyson or a Robbie Williams or large non-Māori companies from wearing and exploiting the moko".

Rachael A. Carmen et al. in the Review of General Psychology posit that Tyson's face tattoo may be an example of "body ornamentation as a form of intimidation". Charlie Connell and Edmund Sullivan in Inked describe it as having become "instantly iconic", while Vice's Mitchell Sunderland ranks it as one of the two things Tyson is best known for, alongside biting off part of Evander Holyfield's ear. Marie Hadley, in A History of Intellectual Property in 50 Objects, writes that the tattoo "has been described as one of the most distinctive tattoos in North America". Its stature has increased over time, aided by Tyson and the 2009 comedy The Hangover, in which it is prominent on Tyson, who appears as a fictionalized version of himself. The tattoo has become strongly associated with Tyson and has made his persona more distinctive.

=== The Hangover Part II copyright suit ===
Whitmill v. Warner Bros. Entertainment Inc.
- Court: Eastern District of Missouri
- Full case name: S. Victor Whitmill v. Warner Bros. Entertainment Inc.
- Decided: June 22, 2011 (dismissed)
- Citation: 4:2011cv00752

Court membership
- Judge sitting: Catherine D. Perry

When Tyson got the face tattoo, he agreed in writing that all drawings, artwork, and photographs of it belonged to Whitmill's Paradox-Studio of Dermagraphics, an uncommon step in the tattoo industry. In The Hangover's 2011 sequel, The Hangover Part II, the character Stu Price (played by Ed Helms) gets a face tattoo almost identical to Tyson's. After seeing a poster depicting the tattooed Stu, Whitmill registered a copyright for the tattoo and then on April 28, 2011 filed Whitmill v. Warner Bros. Entertainment Inc., seeking to enjoin The Hangover's distributor, Warner Bros., from using the tattoo in the movie or its promotional materials. Describing the face tattoo as "one of the most distinctive tattoos in the nation", Whitmill did not challenge "Tyson's right to use or control his identity" but challenged Warner Bros.' use of the design itself, without having asked his permission or given him credit.

Warner Bros. asserted about 16 defenses. They acknowledged that the tattoos were similar but denied that theirs was a copy. They further argued that "tattoos on the skin are not copyrightable". They reasoned that a human body is a useful article under 17 U.S.C. § 101 and thus not copyrightable. The question of a tattoo's copyrightability had never been determined by the Supreme Court of the United States. Arguments in the alternative included that Tyson, by allowing them to use his likeness and not objecting to the plot device in The Hangover Part II, had given them an implied license, and that their use of the tattoo constituted fair use as parody because it juxtaposed Tyson as "the epitome of male aggression" with the "milquetoast" Price. Scholar David Nimmer, participating an expert witness for Warner Bros., argued that treating tattoos as copyrightable would violate the Thirteenth Amendment to the United States Constitution as a badge of slavery; Nimmer's declaration was then excluded because it was a legal opinion.

On May 24, 2011, Judge Catherine D. Perry denied Whitmill's request to enjoin the film's release, citing a potential $100 million in damages to Warner Bros. and disruption to related businesses. However, she found that Whitmill had "a strong likelihood of success" on his copyright claim and characterized most of Warner Bros.' arguments as "just silly", saying:

Of course tattoos can be copyrighted. I don't think there is any reasonable dispute about that. They are not copyrighting Mr. Tyson's face, or restricting Mr. Tyson's use of his own face, as the defendant argues, or saying that someone who has a tattoo can't remove the tattoo or change it, but the tattoo itself and the design itself can be copyrighted, and I think it's entirely consistent with the copyright law.

She also described the tattoo used in the movie as "an exact copy" rather than a parody. On June 6, Warner Bros. told the court that, in the event the dispute was not resolved, it would alter the appearance of the tattoo in the movie's home release. On June 20 it announced a settlement with Whitmill under undisclosed terms.

==== Impact and analysis ====
While the outcome of the case was not precedential, Perry's comments were the first time that a government official commented on the copyrightability of tattoos. They were also significant in drawing a distinction between the tattoo's design and application. Despite the case settling, it prompted further discussion of the topic and speculation as to how the case might have proceeded if it had gone to trial.

Timothy C. Bradley in Entertainment & Sports Lawyer finds Warner Bros.' useful article argument meritless; in the Cardozo Arts & Entertainment Law Journal, Craig P. Bloom similarly notes that Tyson's tattoo has no utilitarian function. Both stress that Tyson's face tattoo is conceptually separable from his body. Bradley concludes that tattoos are copyrightable and that Whitmill owns the copyright to Tyson's face tattoo. Bradley further argues, however, that Tyson has an implied license that mitigates a number of aspects of Whitmill's copyright. Yolanda M. King in the Journal of Intellectual Property Law agrees that there was an implied license for Tyson to appear in various media and invokes Roberta Rosenthal Kwall's proposal of a public display right for people with copyrighted tattoos. King is dismissive of Nimmer's Thirteenth Amendment argument in terms of tattoos' copyrightability, but agrees that it may have relevance to tattoo copyright enforcement.

Bradley and King agree that any license to Tyson would not extend to Warner Bros. recreating the tattoo on another person's face, but Bradley concludes that Warner Bros.' actions were nonetheless likely fair use, while King argues that the replication of the tattoo on Price's face was satire rather than parody and thus not protected by fair use under Campbell v. Acuff-Rose Music, Inc. Ultimately, Bradley writes that, even if a fair use defense failed, Whitmill would not have won significant damages, as he had only registered the copyright after the alleged infringement began and could thus only collect on compensatory damages.

==== Māori response ====
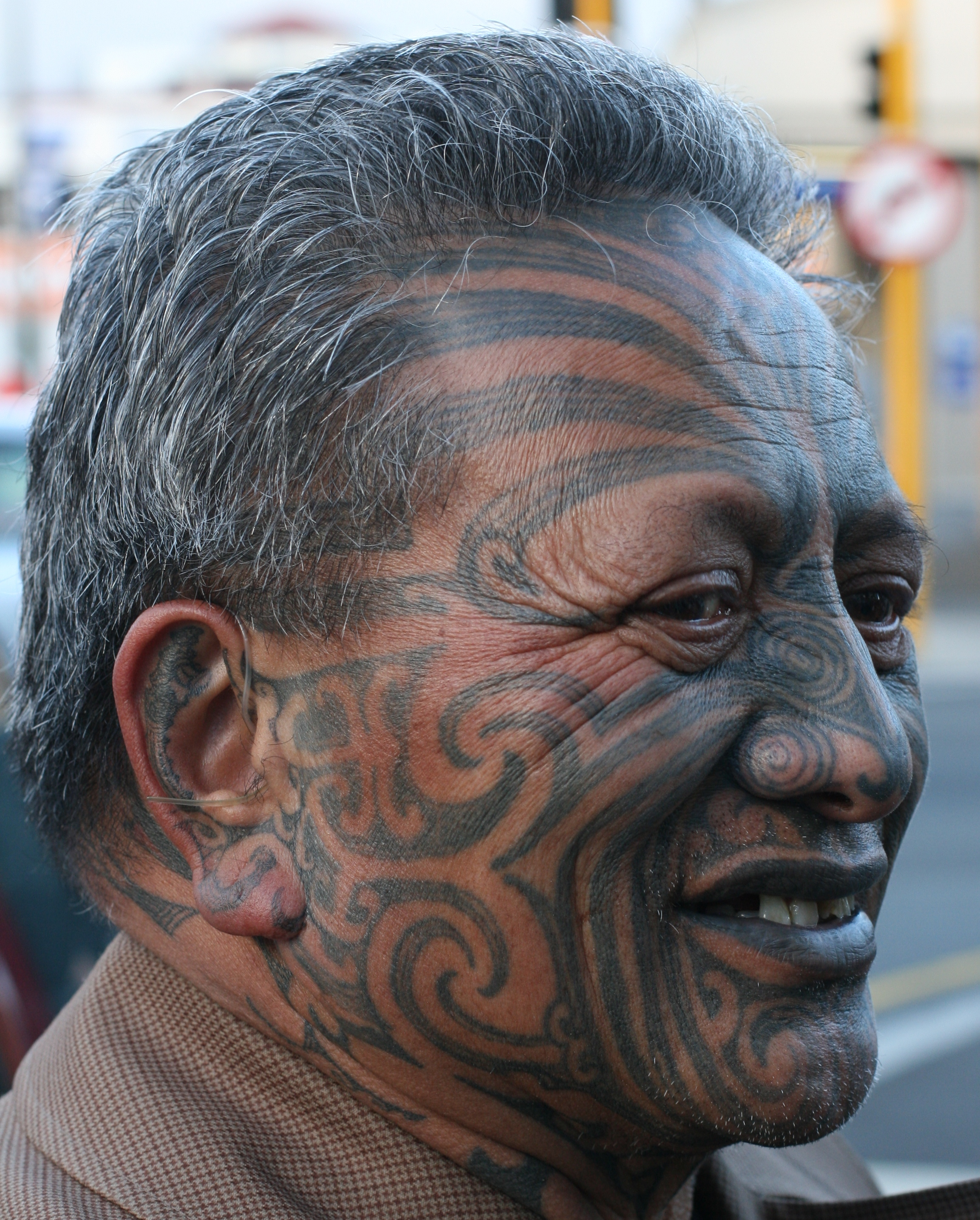
An example of traditional tā moko design belonging to Tāme Iti

Many Māori took issue with Whitmill suing for copyright infringement when the work was, in their view, appropriative of moko. Ngahuia Te Awekotuku, an expert on Māori tattoos, told The New Zealand Herald that "[i]t is astounding that a Pākehā tattooist who inscribes an African American's flesh with what he considers to be a Māori design has the gall to claim ... that design as his intellectual property" and accused Whitmill of having "never consulted with Māori" and having "stole[n] the design". Bloom suggests that Te Awekotuku's argument could have formed the basis for a defense that the tattoo fell below the threshold of originality.

Some tā moko artists differed, seeing it not as appropriative of moko but rather a hybrid of several tattoo styles; Rangi Kipa saw no Māori elements at all. The perspective of those like Te Awekotuku highlights the conflict between Māori conception of moko—which reflect a person's genealogy—as collective property and the Anglo-American view of copyright as belonging to a single person. While Warner Bros. initially said they would investigate whether the tattoo was a derivative of any Māori works, there was no further discussion of the matter prior to the case settling.
