= Face tattoo =

Tattoo located on the bearer's face or head

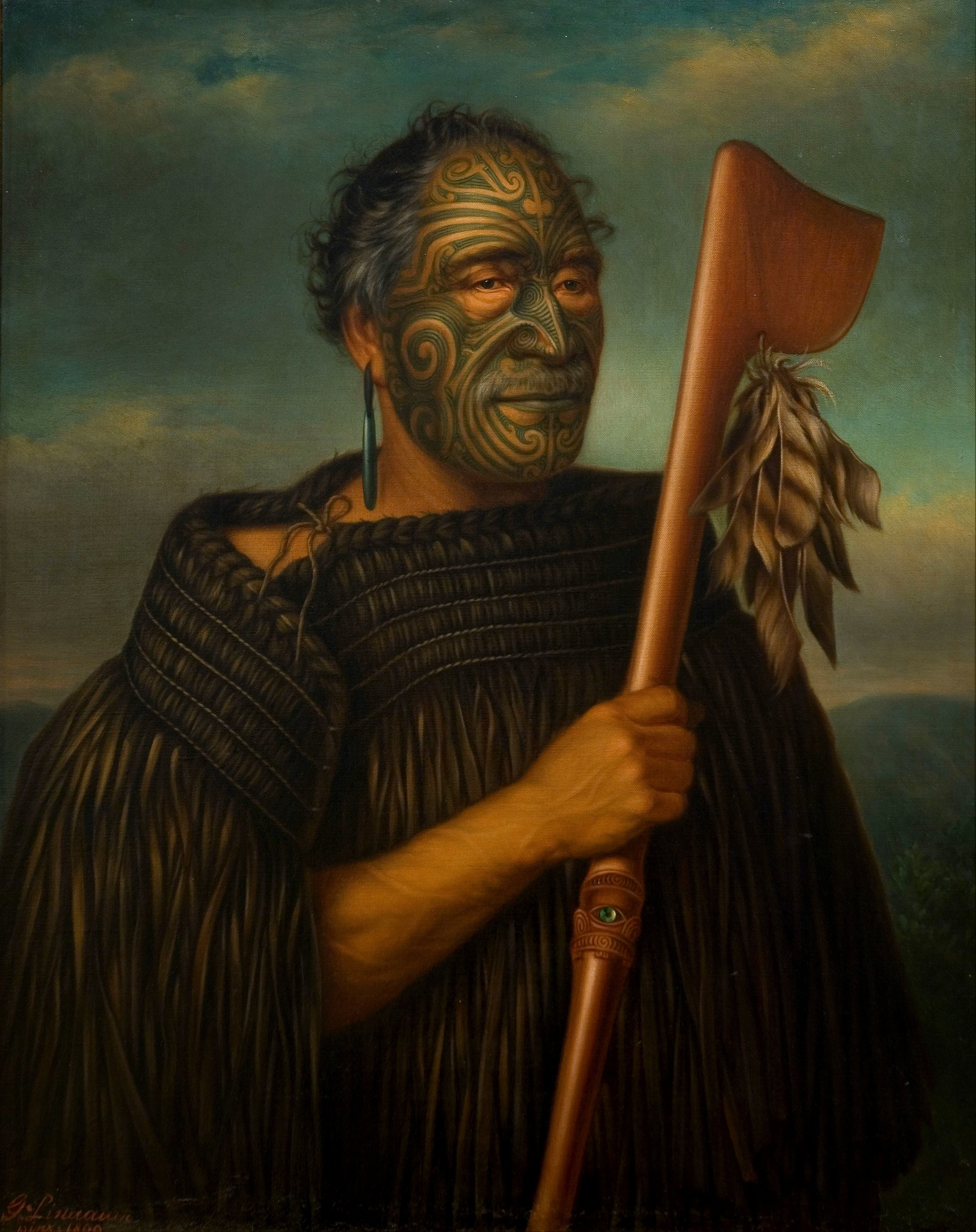
Portrait of Tāmati Wāka Nene, a Māori rangatira, by Gottfried Lindauer (1890)

A face tattoo or facial tattoo is a tattoo located on the bearer's face or head. It is part of the traditional tattoos of many ethnic groups.

In modern times, although it is considered taboo and socially unacceptable in many cultures, as well as considered extreme in body art, this style and placement of tattoo has emerged in certain subcultures. This is due to the continuing acceptance of tattoos and the emergence of hip-hop culture popularizing styles such as the teardrop tattoo.

== Traditions ==
Face tattooing is traditionally practiced by many ethnic groups worldwide.

=== As indicator of status, maturity, or beauty ===
==== Ainu ====
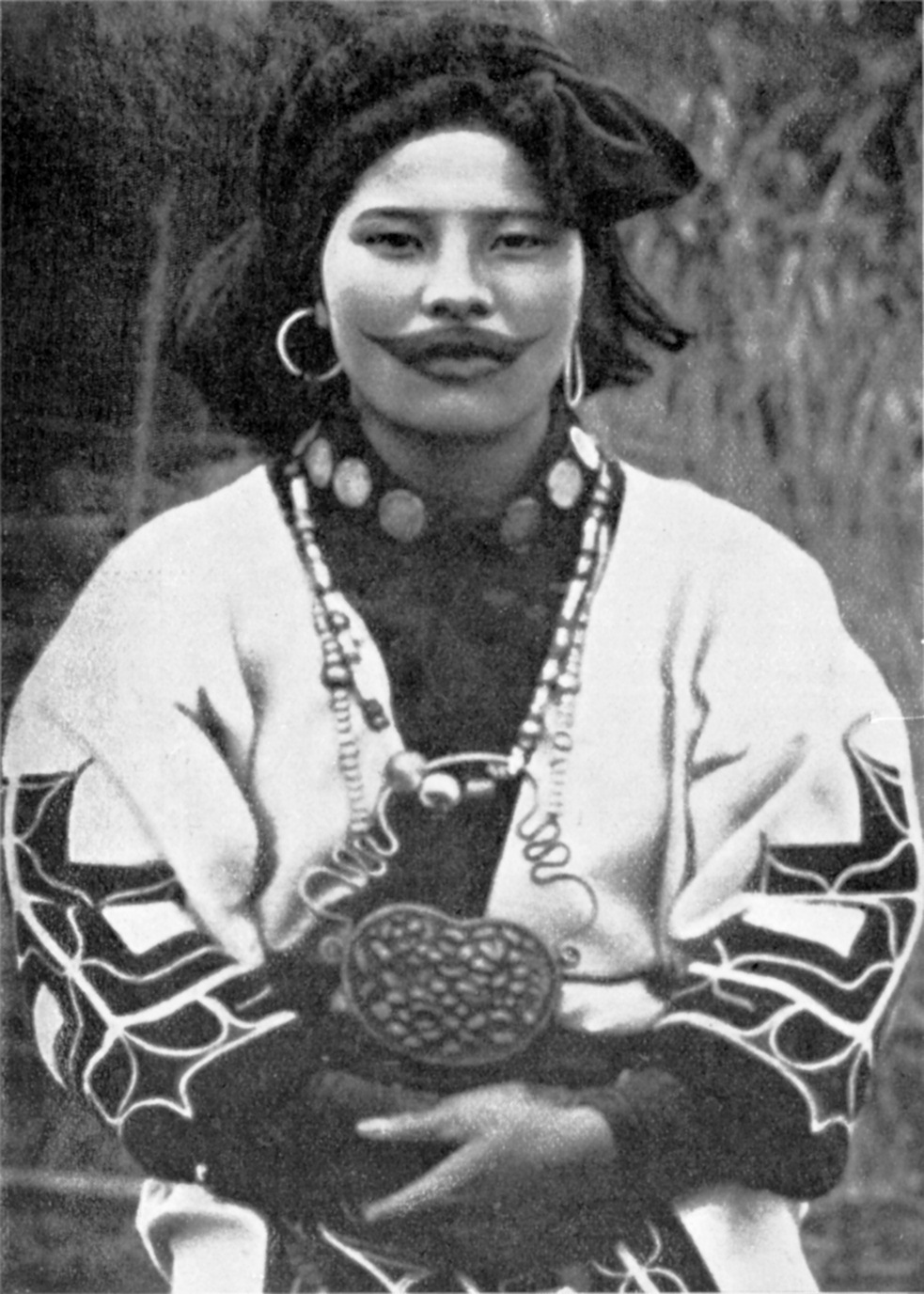
An Ainu woman with a facial tattoo

The Ainu people of northern Japan and parts of Russia, including Sakhalin, the Kuril Islands and Kamchatka Krai, have a practice of facial tattooing exclusive to women, in which a smile is inked around the mouth to prevent spirits from entering the body through the mouth. This form of tattooing also serves a secondary purpose of showing maturity.

==== Atayal ====
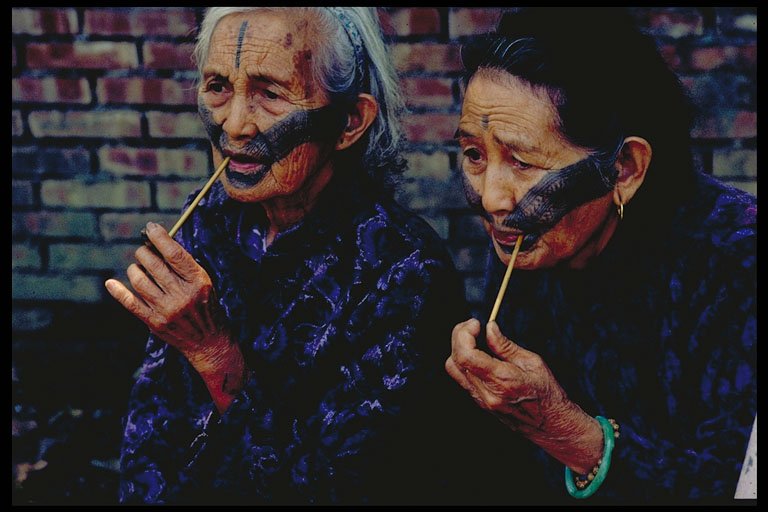
Two elder Atayal women with facial tattoos as a symbol of maturity

In Taiwan, facial tattoos of the Atayal people are called ptasan; they are used to demonstrate that an adult man can protect his homeland, and that an adult woman is qualified to weave cloth and perform housekeeping.

==== Inuit and Alaskan and Canadian Natives ====
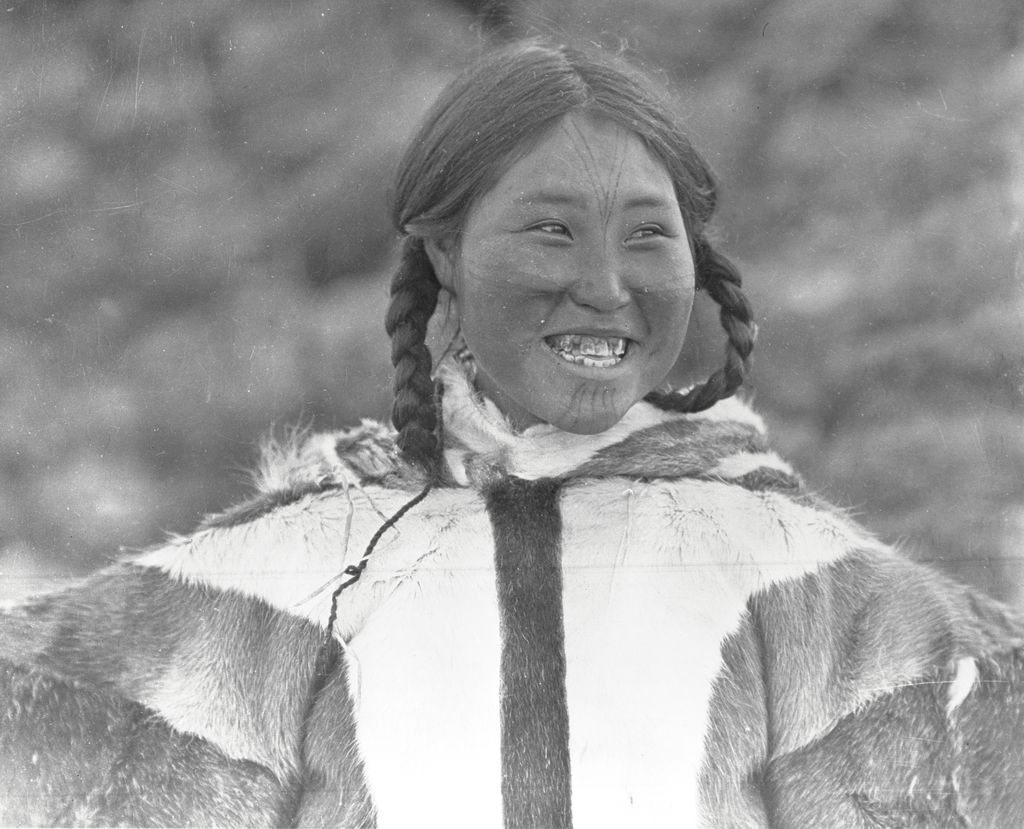
Inuk woman with facial tattoo

Facial tattoos were practiced among Inuit women, but this practice was suppressed by missionaries. Yidįįłtoo are the traditional face tattoos of the Hän Gwich’in, who are indigenous to Alaska and Canada. Kakiniit and Tavlugun are other examples.

In the 21st century, there was a revival of traditional facial tattooing among Indigenous Arctic women. Quannah Chasinghorse wears Yidįįłtoo.

==== Māori ====
Among the Māori people, men traditionally received tattoos on the entire face, while in women it was mostly restricted to the lips (kauwae) and chins. These tattoos were traditionally part of the initiation into adulthood and signified rank and status, as well as being considered beautiful. Māori traditional tattooing (tā moko) enjoyed a revitalisation in the Māori renaissance, and is still widely practised today.

==== Medieval Europe ====
Medieval pilgrims would frequently get tattoos whilst visiting the Holy Land, including the occasional face tattoo. Crusaders may have got facial tattoos as permanent proof of their participation in the Crusades, although this is unknown.

==== Middle East/North Africa ====
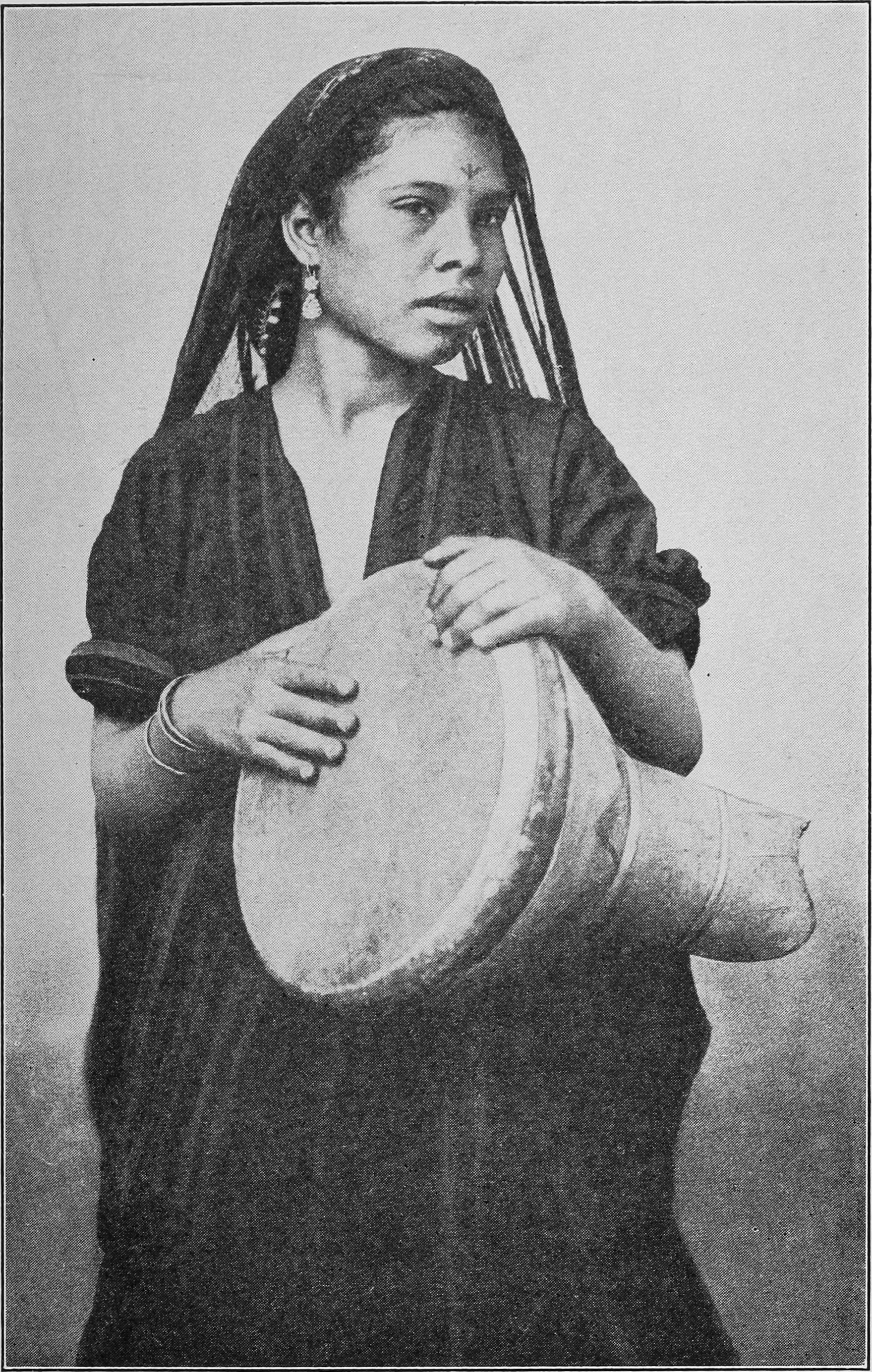
An Egyptian fellah girl with forehead and chin tattoos.

Facial tattoos are widespread across various parts of the Middle East and parts of North Africa. In the Levant, facial tattoos are primarily adorned by the women of the Bedouin tribes living throughout Jordan to symbolize beauty and social status. In some instances tattoos are also used for their believed "magick" properties. Facial markings are also seen in Iraq among the Yezidi women. In North Africa, face tattoos can be found among the indigenous Berbers that populated the region before the arrival of Arab armies from the East. In all cases, it is primarily the women that adorn facial markings and while men did have tattoos in some cases, they were primarily on the hands, arms, and feet. The tattoos throughout the Middle East and Africa share many similarities in the use and style of the geometric designs and glyphs that symbolize various animals, element signs, and physical attributes.

In turn-of-the-century fellah communities, Egyptian women, both Muslin and Christian, sometimes sported tattoos on their chins.

==== Makonde ====
Dinembo are the traditional face tattoos of the Makonde people, who are indigenous to Kenya, Tanzania and Mozambique. These tattoos were traditionally part of the initiation into adulthood.

==== Philippines ====
===== Cordillerans =====
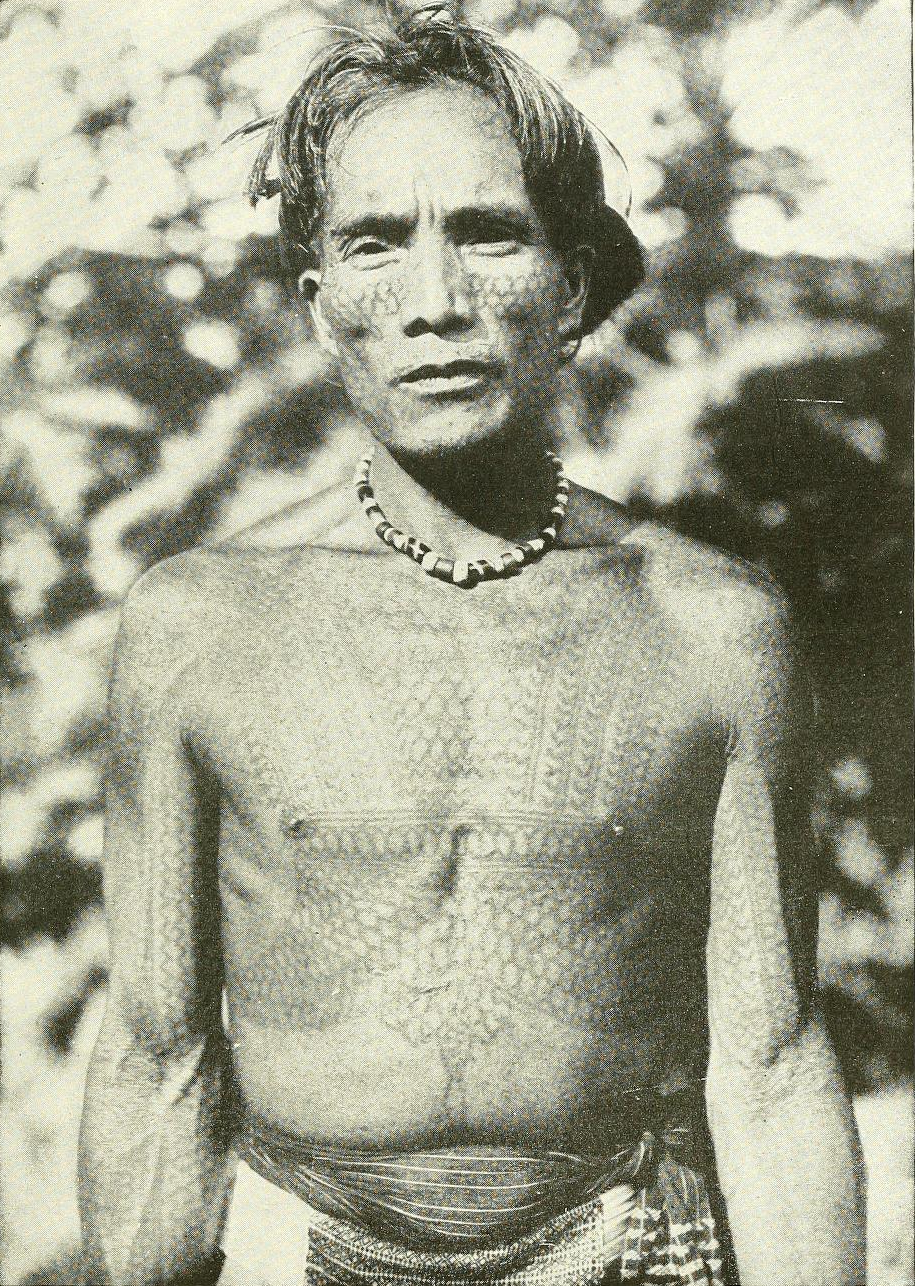
Lakay Wanawan of the Kalinga people (c. 1912), a renowned warrior

Among the various Cordilleran (Igorot) peoples of the northern Philippines, facial tattoos indicated that a warrior belonged to the highest rank.

Among the Kalinga people, pregnant women were also tattooed with small x-shaped marks on the forehead, cheeks, and the tip of the nose to protect them and the unborn child from the vengeful spirits of slain enemies.

===== Visayans =====
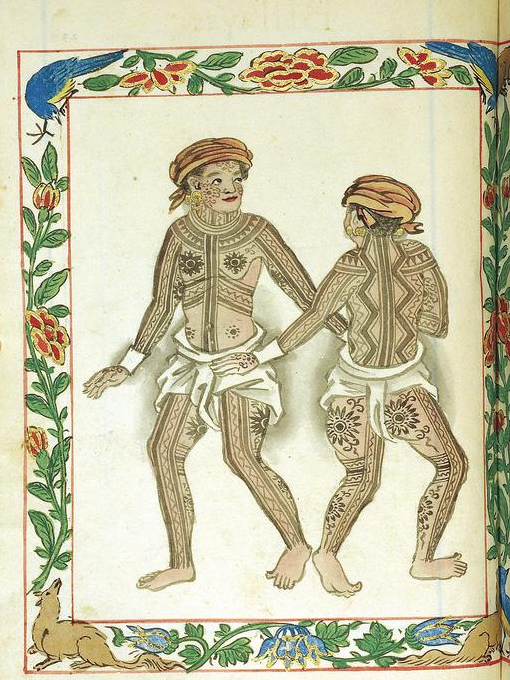
Visayan timawa (warrior-nobility) with facial tattoos in the Boxer Codex (c. 1590)

Among the heavily-tattooed Visayans of the central and southern Philippines, face tattoos were known as bangut or langi. They were often meant to resemble frightening masks, like crocodile jaws or raptorial beaks. These tattoos were reserved only for the most elite warriors (timawa), and possessing facial tattoos indicated high personal status.

=== As deterrent from abduction ===
==== Apatani ====
Among the Apatani people in Arunachal Pradesh in India, women used to tattoo lines on the chin, and from the forehead to the tip of the nose, as well as wear large nose plugs. The reason for this is unknown, but it is believed that the tattoos serve as a way to make women less beautiful and protect them from abductions. Men also had a T-shaped tattoo on the chin. These traditions were practiced up until around 1974.

==== Chin people ====
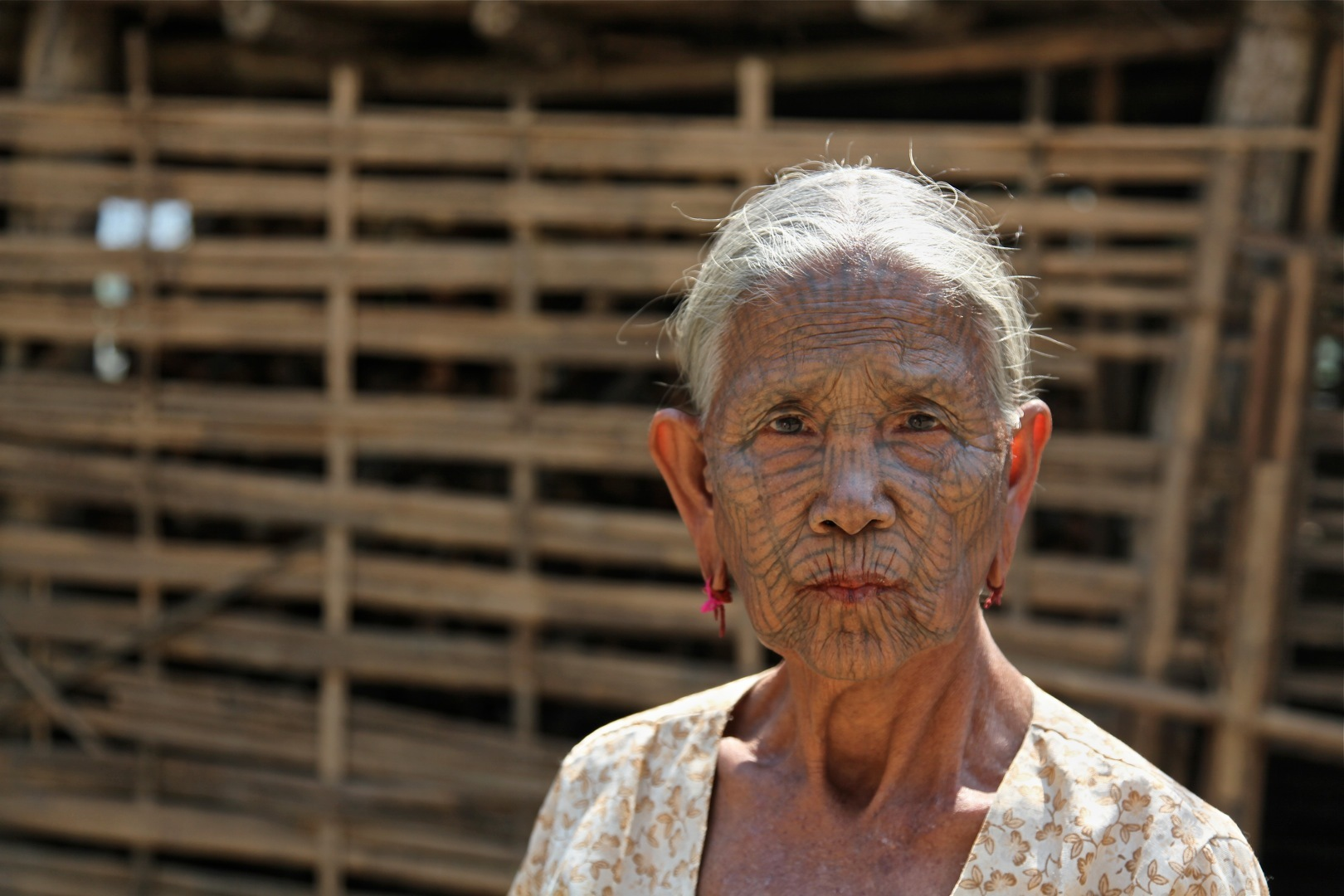
Chin woman with face tattoo

Southern Chin women were also tattooed on their faces with closely set lines using blue pigments, ostensibly to discourage them from being kidnapped by invaders. Chin women were typically tattooed between the ages of 15 and 20. The practice has quickly disappeared, as it was banned in the 1960s by Burma's totalitarian regime and it was discouraged by Christian missionaries. Mro women also wore tattoos in the form of small marks or stars on the cheek, forehead or breast.

==== Derung ====
The Derung people of southwestern China practiced facial tattooing only for women. They receive these tattoos at around age 12. The practice is believed to make the women less attractive and thus less likely to be abducted.

=== As punishment ===
==== Ancient Rome ====
In Ancient Rome, slaves who fled or attempted escape from their masters would frequently be branded on their foreheads or tattooed against their will. These tattoos portrayed the crimes committed and were a punishment because of the inability to cover up a tattoo on the forehead. As the Roman world entered late antiquity, extreme Christian sects began to use former-slave forehead tattoos as religious symbols and signs of strength. Religious facial and head tattoos were not socially unacceptable within these circles though in the greater Roman mainstream there was still an association between face tattoos and former slavery. In 315/316 CE, an edict outlawed facial tattoos and facial branding/tattooing for slaves.

==== Vietnam ====
In ancient Vietnam, face tattooing was considered as a form of punishment. In 1042, King Ly Thai Tong issued the Hinh Thu, or Criminal Law, in which criminals were caned or tattooed 20 to 50 characters on their faces.

== Modern day ==
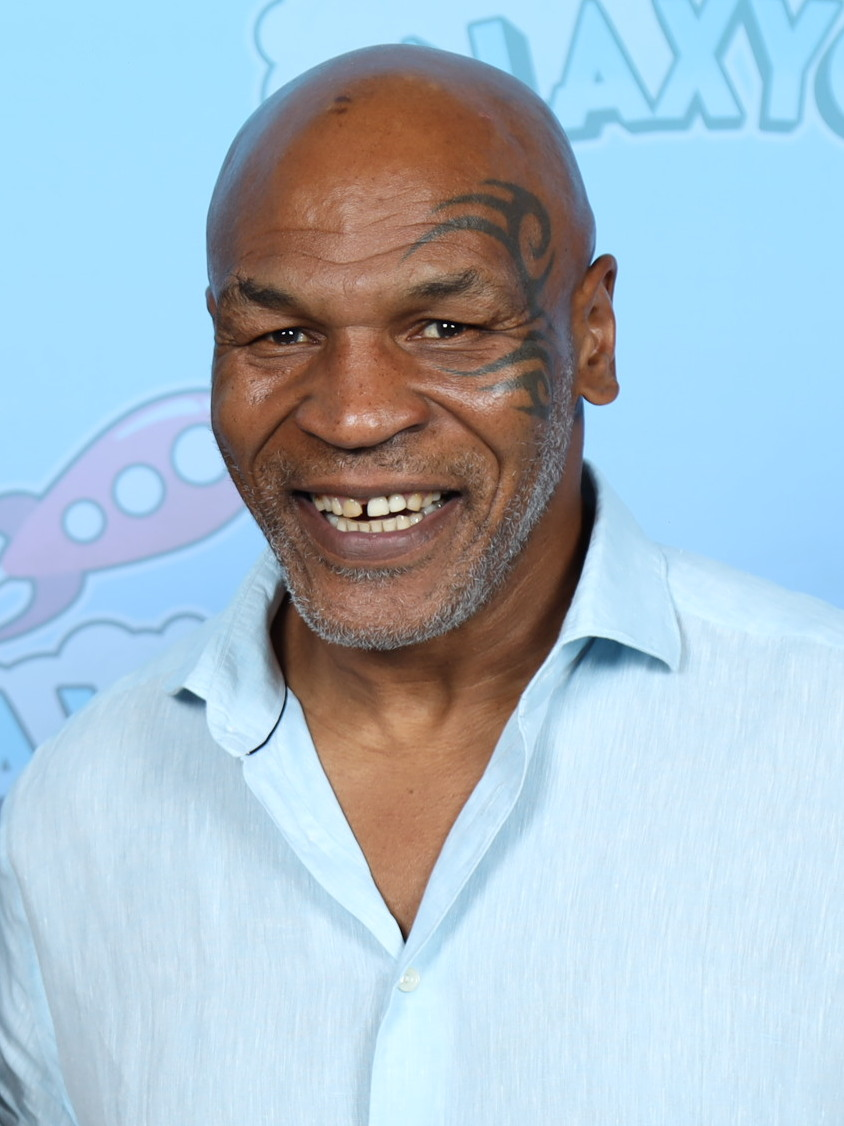
American boxer Mike Tyson is well known for his tattoos. His iconic tribal face tattoo around his left eye was completed in 2003.

Face tattoos have been considered socially unacceptable and "outrageous" and generally will prohibit the tattooed person from finding employment and result in discrimination. Most tattoo artists will attempt to dissuade clients from getting a facial tattoo, and in some cases may outright refuse to do a facial tattoo. However, many artists are usually more agreeable to doing facial tattoos for clients who already have an extensive collection of tattoos elsewhere on his or her body.

Due to how tattoos were used in the 20th century, they are often associated with criminality. Many gangs and criminal organizations mark members with tattoos, including visible areas such as the face, head, and neck. Members may get facial tattoos as a form of intimidation. This started in California in the 1980s before becoming widespread.

A 2013 study published in Psychology, Public Policy, and Law concluded that face tattoos often lead to bias in the jury and more frequent convictions. Many ex-convicts also have facial tattoos, due to prison tattooing, and the culture of prison tattoos includes the indoctrination of people within the prison populace into gangs, which often require tattoos to show aggression. These tattoos include teardrop tattoos indicating that the bearer has either taken a life or lost someone close to them; a five-point crown, a common Latin Kings symbol; and a number of different facial tattoos alluding to Nazism in the Aryan Brotherhood and Salvadorian culture in MS-13.

In the mid 2000s, the trend of getting a facial tattoo emerged among celebrities, starting with boxer Mike Tyson's large tribal tattoo in 2003 and the ascension of rap music from the underground to the mainstream. This allowed artists with a criminal background and face tattoos to become well known, including Birdman, Lil Wayne and The Game. Lil Wayne's extensive tattooing of his face created a minor trend that he helped pioneer inspiring rappers like Gucci Mane and then-chart topper Soulja Boy to get facial tattoos.

Though discrimination remains in the fashion world for models who have facial tattoos, generally models with face tattoos of the brand they're modeling for, such as having a Chanel logo under your eye, is becoming acceptable.

=== Hip-hop culture ===
The influence of artists like Lil Wayne and Fredo Santana getting face tattoos was not fully realized until the mid-2010s with the resurgence of trap music and the "SoundCloud rap" scene. Artists such as Ghostemane, Travis Scott, 21 Savage and Migos all have facial tattoos and emerged between 2014 and 2016, soon entering the mainstream and the Billboard Hot 100. Entrance of hip-hop culture into the mainstream has led to face tattoos increasing in popularity. The insurgence of many trap artists in the 2010s increased the popularity of face tattoos.

== See also ==
- Permanent cosmetics
