= Nancy Saunders (artist) =

Inuk artist and actor (born 1986)

Nancy Saunders (born 1986) is a multidisciplinary Inuk artist from Kuujjuaq, Quebec (Nunavik), Canada. She lives mainly in Montreal, Quebec. She is largely known in the art world by her Inuktitut name Niap. Niap uses many different art techniques like carving, textiles, painting, sculpting, Inuit throat singing and acting / performing.

== Early life ==
Niap's mother is Inuk and her father is non-indigenous (Québécois). When Niap was 12 years old, her and her family moved to the Laurentides. A few years later they all moved back to Nunavik in Quebec.

== Education and career ==
In 2012, Niap had discovered her talent for drawing which is what had started her career in the art world. For a period of time she had worked as an assistant at the Pièce de Théâtre Aalaapi. Niap has a bachelor degree in visual arts from Concordia University'. In 2016, she then completed her residency in Paris at the École des Beaux-Arts. That same year she worked as an artist-in-residence with Adventure Canada.

== Exhibitions and art projects ==
Niap has many exhibitions and art projects, both solo and collective. She uses her art to help her explore her identity as an Inuk woman and to share her culture as well as life in Nunavik. Nunavik heavily influences her work.

=== Paintings and drawings ===
- 2017: She created a mural at the Canadian Museum of Nature in Ottawa, which is a permanent mural at the museum. The mural is named Ilurqusivut, which means Our ways in Inuktitut. It was a piece that was created for the Canada Goose Arctic Gallery. This mural has an anamorphic effect with a 3D illusion. It includes many different animals that are found in the north like seal, caribou, Canada geese and a hunter in traditional sealskin clothing. It also features ice floes, kakiniit (traditional Inuit tattoos), parka trims and there are flowers surrounding it.
- 2019: Niap had her first solo exhibition at Feheley Fine Arts in Toronto. The exhibition is called Ivalu in Inuktitut, this word means Sinew Thread. This exhibit is ink drawings of women's hands and family portraits. She sewed tattoos on the art with either wax thread or sinew (traditional way of Inuit tattooing).

=== Sculptures ===
- 2018: Niap had an exhibition at OBORO Gallery in Montreal. This exhibition is a sculpture called Katajjausivallaat in Inuktitut, which means le rythme bercé in French] The exhibit was suspended stone sculptures, she throat sang with another women so that people can see the stones sway to their singing. The exhibit represents that throat singing is important to keeping the Inuit culture alive. After the exhibition, the Montreal Museum of Fine Arts had acquired it, this is the first installation piece at the Montreal Museum of Fine Arts by an Inuk artist.

=== Performances and acting ===
- 2018: Niap starred in a documentary called The Fifth Region. In this documentary, she and another Inuk, Joshua Stribbell, discuss what it was like being raised in urban settings as Inuit and their struggles with their identities.
- 2019: Niap acted in a play at the Centre du Théâtre d'Aujourd'hui. The play is called Aalaapi, which means "keeping quiet to hear something beautiful" in Inuktitut. This was the first time it had been performed in front of a live audience.
- 2020: Niap was cast in a television series called Épidémie, the series is on TVA. She played the character Nelli Kadjulik, who is a PhD student in biochemistry with Inuit descent.

=== Other works ===
- 2015: Her first exhibition at Montreal's McClure Gallery. This was a group exhibition called Ullumimut, which means Between Tradition and Innovation in Inuktitut.
- 2018: Niap was a part of an artist project called Innuvugut for Art Toronto.
- 2021: Niap had another solo exhibit at Feheley Fine Arts in Toronto. This exhibition was called Silavut. This was her 4th solo exhibition.

== Distinctions ==
- 2005: When Niap was a teenager she walked from Duncan, British Colombia, Canada to Ottawa, Ontario. This walk was to raise awareness of prevention for Indigenous youth suicide. She is an advocate for the Inuit community and culture.
- 2014: She was asked to throat sing at a ceremony in Quebec. This ceremony was to recognize the importance of Inuit throat singing as a form of cultural heritage under the Cultural Heritage Act.
- 2015: Niap won a drawing contest in Nunavik held by the Tulattavik Health Centre. The portrait she drew is called Elashuk.
- 2017: Niap had received a scholarship called the Inuit Art Foundation's Virginia J.Watt Scholarship. This scholarship supported her studies in both Inuit art and Inuit culture in post-secondary.
