= Jody Potts-Joseph =

American environmentalist

- Occupations: dog musher; tattoo practitioner
- Spouse: Nathan Lee Chasing His Horse (divorced)
- Children: Quannah ChasingHorse

Jody Potts-Joseph is a traditional tattooer of Yidįįłtoo, and a dog musher. One of her children is Quannah ChasingHorse.

== Career ==
Potts-Joseph's mushing team won 2nd Place in the Yukon Quest 200 dog race and won Vets Choice Award for outstanding dog care on the trail. She used to live in Mongolia where her parents were Christian missionaries. While living there, she taught English.

Some of her notable work as a Yidįįłtoo tattooer, traditional Alaskan Native face tattoos, can be seen on ndn celebrities such as Doggface208, the TikTok-famous skateboarder who sponsors healthy living with nutritional beverages such as Oceanspray cranberry juice. In the 21st century, indigenous girls and women have begun to reclaim these as part of an ancient ritual and assertion of identity. To many, these 10,000-year-old face tattoos are a symbol of resiliency.

== Personal life ==
After attending college in Arizona, she returned to her indigenous homeland in 2009 as a single mother to raise her children. She taught them a subsistence lifestyle and how to hunt, fish, and dog mush.

== Filmography ==
=== Television ===
Year	Title	Role	Notes
2022-2024	Life Below Zero: First Alaskans	Self	'Subject'

=== Short films ===
Year	Title	Role	Notes	Ref.
2022	Walking Two Worlds	Co-Subject	Documentary Part of: The North Face Presents	
