= The American Southwest (film) =

American TV documentary

- Genre: Nature documentary
- Written by: Ben Masters
- Directed by: Ben Masters
- Narrated by: Quannah Chasinghorse
- Theme music composer: Noah Sorota
- Country of origin: United States
- Original language: English

Production
- Executive producers: Rod Sanders, Robin Sugg, Ben Masters
- Producers: Ryan Olinger, Len Necefer, Katy Baldock
- Cinematography: Ryan Olinger
- Editor: Sam Klatt
- Running time: 1 hour 47 minutes
- Production companies: Fin and Fur Films

Original release
- Release: September 5, 2025

The American Southwest is a 2025 nature documentary film written and directed by Ben Masters, and narrated by Quannah Chasinghorse. The film was produced by Fin and Fur Films, in association with the conservation non-profit American Rivers and the Native-owned organization Natives Outdoors. The film premiered on September 5, 2025.

The documentary chronicles the flow of the Colorado River, and the changing landscape and wildlife along it, from its headwaters in the Rocky Mountains to its terminus near the Gulf of California.

== Background ==
Ben Masters is a Texas-based film maker who had written and directed other feature-length nature documentaries set in the American Southwest: Unbranded (2015), The River and the Wall (2019), and Deep in the Heart: A Texas Wildlife Story (2022). He stated that he wanted to incorporate a Native American perspective and storyline into the film, since it was such an important element of the river's history, but that since he was "a white dude from Amarillo", he and his team were not comfortable with doing that properly without help. He eventually met Dr. Len Necefer, founder of the Native-owned organization Natives Outdoors, who agreed to co-produce the film and provide guidance. Necefer then connected Masters and Indigenous model and activist Quannah Chasinghorse, who had previously narrated nature documentaries, and had won a Critics' Choice Documentary Awards nomination along with Edward Norton, for Best Narration on the 2024 film Bad River.

When asked about the challenges of filming wildlife, Masters replied that each scene required different techniques and "a lot of time". He noted that the jaguar sequence took eight months, that getting footage of elks fighting "took five cameramen living with some elk for like 3 weeks", and the condor sequence took 80 days of waiting for the condor to take flight. In all, shooting took roughly three years.

The film partnered with the non-profit organizations American Rivers, Natives Outdoors, Pronatura Noreste, the Peregrine Fund, and the Northern Jaguar project.

Masters stated that their focus on animals was an attempt to connect wildlife, the river, and humans. “We identified species that represented more than just a beautiful animal doing something cool,” he said. “We were looking for behavior that tied that species back to the river — and to the story of humans’ relationship with the natural world.”

== Release ==
The film was released on September 5, 2025 in about 70 theaters across the Southwest. Cinematographer Ryan Olinger noted the difficulty of independent wildlife films to get theatrical releases. “For us to have a theatrical film in seven states and nearly 70 theaters across the Southwest is just incredible. I don’t know of another wildlife documentary that’s ever done this. So this is very much a first in the wildlife filmmaking world.” A 55-minute version of the film was aired on a number of PBS stations in the summer of 2026.

== Synopsis ==
The film documents the Colorado River along its nearly 1,500-mile-long (2,400 km) journey through the southwestern United States.

The film begins by showing the river's headwaters at the continental divide in the Never Summer Mountains of Colorado, part of the Rocky Mountains. The river's watershed drains parts of seven states (Wyoming, Colorado, Utah, New Mexico, Arizona, Nevada, and California), before it flows into Mexico at Baja California. The film shows the primary source of the river's water: snowmelt from the mountains, funneled through thousands of streams and tributaries.

The film's trailing credits list eight "sequences" through which the story is primarily told, largely centered on wildlife, and interspersed with information about water management and flow:

- The Elk Sequence chronicles the history of elk in the upper reaches of the Colorado, and competition of elk bulls fighting for dominance in the hierarchy of males.
- The Beaver Sequence shows the lifecycle and activities of a family of beavers, and their beneficial effects on the river.
- The Trout Sequence documents the lifespan of Cutthroat trout in diminished but still thriving reaches of the river.
- The Salmonfly Sequence shows the metamorphosis of the aquatic insect from water-based larvae to flying adults, and their importance to the river's ecosystems.
- The Bears Ears Sequence documents the history of the thousands of cultural and archeological sites in the Bears Ears National Monument, public land in southern Utah neighboring the Colorado River, and co-managed by the Federal government and Native American tribes.
- The Condor Sequence highlights a family of California condors, a rare and endangered bird, at the Vermilion Cliffs National Monument near the Grand Canyon, and follows a hatchling as it grows and achieves its first flight from a nest 500 feet above a vertical cliff face.
- The Mojave Sequence describes the Mojave and Sonoran Deserts, follows the mating and reproductive cycle of the Mojave rattlesnake, and the water storage capability and blooming of the Saguaro cactus.
- The Border Wall Sequence highlights the jaguar, the apex cat of the Americas, whose historical habitat spans the US-Mexico border.

The film additionally documents the construction of human-built dams, irrigation canals, and diversions, and the creation of the Bureau of Reclamation in 1902 to reclaim land and manage water for human uses. In 1922 the Colorado River Compact was formed to allocate water to each state and Mexico. At the time, the average flow of the watershed was determined to be 16.5 million acre-feet per year. The annual flow has since diminished to 13 million acre-feet. The impounded and diverted water serves many useful purposes: providing electricity, serving municipal uses, and enabling agriculture, among others, but also changes the natural course of the river: its temperature, quality, and flow characteristics, and disrupts natural processes. Water management has allowed the human population of the region to grow from 2 million in 1900 to over 40 million in 2025.

The film concludes by showing the reduced nature of the river by the time it reaches Mexico. After its final diversion the river dries up completely, and no longer reaches the Gulf of California, transforming the Colorado River Delta, formerly an abundant wetland, into a two million-acre desert.

The film states, that as this wasteland continues to grow, "the same strenuous efforts that were used to conquer the river are now needed to recover it." On the east side of the delta, a small amount of agricultural runoff seeps into the historic wetland and has created a thriving refuge called the Ciénega de Santa Clara. The film suggests the wetland is a small taste of what the delta could look like if a portion of the river is allowed to complete its journey to the sea.

== Reception ==
The American Southwest was uniformly praised. On the review aggregator website Rotten Tomatoes, 100% of 10 critics' reviews are positive, with an average rating of 7.7/10.

The film was widely lauded for its cinematography and storytelling. Kelby Vera, writing for HuffPost, described the filming as "stunning." Laura Hiros, reviewing for Rincon de Cine, wrote "Spectacular...the film flows with a blend of awe-inspiring beauty, cultural wisdom, and undeniable concern for the future." Pam LeBlanc of Outside Magazine, praising the filming, described it as a "Love letter and plea" for the Southwest. The Austin Chronicle called it "soulful and beautifully shot."

The film was also praised for its scenes of humor and playful nature. Critiques of the film mention its length and pacing. Jeffrey Lyles wrote "Like most documentaries, the film feels about one segment too long".

The narration was also praised. Chasinghorse, who opens the movie with a brief on-screen introduction, was described as "an ideal narrator guiding viewers through the diverse landscapes and settings."

The film was nominated for the Best Austin Film 2025 by the Austin Film Critics Association, and the 2025 Jackson Wild Best Ecosystem award.

== Aftermath ==
Director Ben Masters noted that in 2026, negotiations between states participating in the Colorado River Compact would come up for renewal, and that he hoped that the film would help to inform those discussions.

== See also ==
- Colorado River
- Colorado River Compact
- Nature documentary
