= Nathan Chasing Horse =

Native American actor (born 1976)

Nathan Lee Chasing His Horse
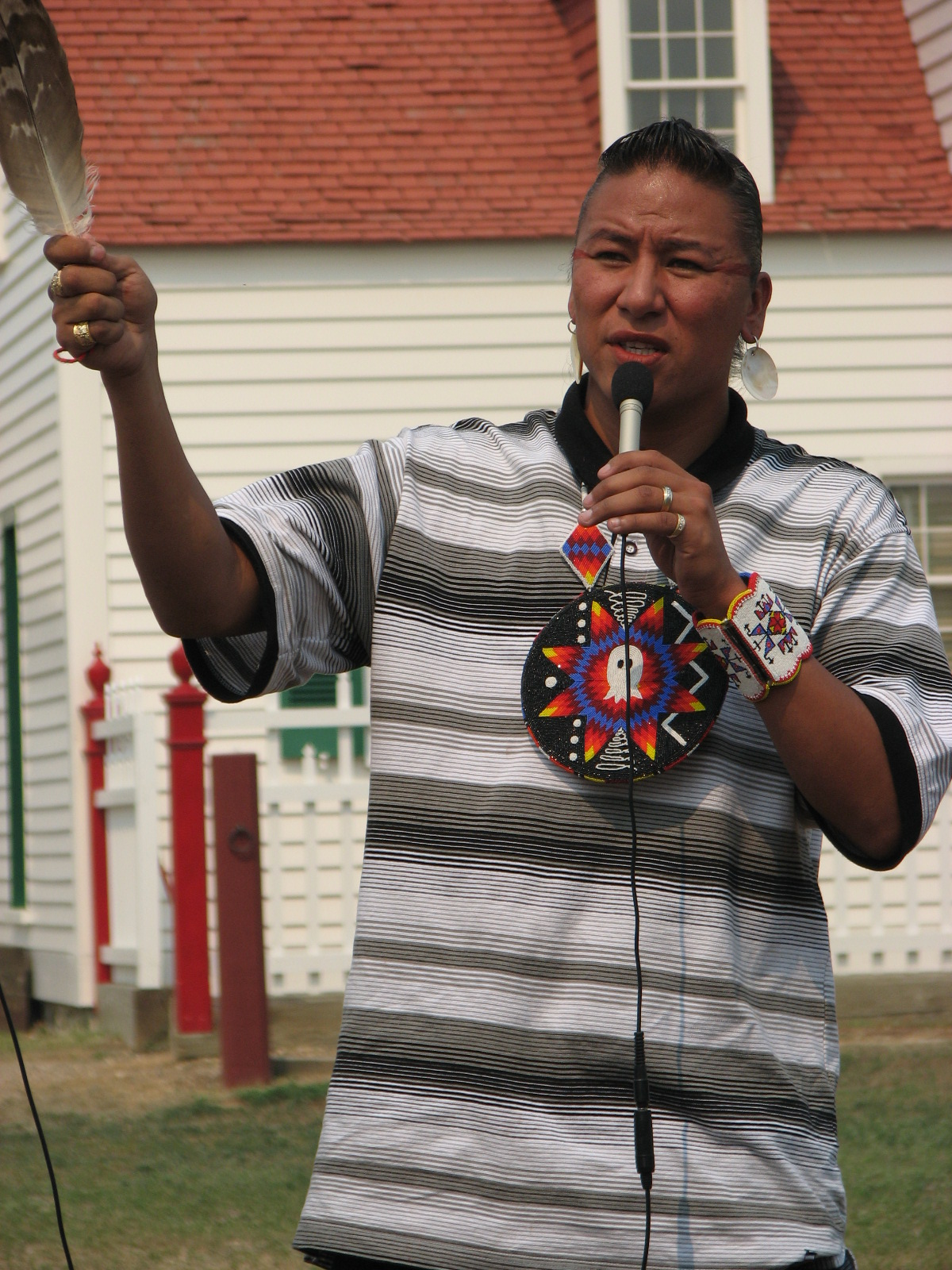
- Chasing Horse in 2007
- Born: April 28, 1976 (age 50); Rosebud Lakota Sioux Reservation, South Dakota, U.S.
- Occupation: Actor
- Years active: 1990–2023
- Spouse: Jody Potts-Joseph - Wife 3, divorced Angelica Chasinghorse - Wife 5
- Children: Quannah Chasinghorse

Nathan Lee Chasing His Horse (born April 28, 1976), also known as Nathan Chasing Horse and Nathan Chases His Horse, is a Sicangu Lakota former actor. He is known for his role as the young Lakota character Smiles a Lot in Kevin Costner's 1990 film Dances with Wolves.

In 2026, he was convicted of sexually assaulting Indigenous women and girls, using his reputation as a Lakota medicine man to gain access to his victims, and was sentenced to life imprisonment.

== Life and career ==
Chasing Horse is the son of Joseph Chasing Horse, a Lakota traditional leader. The family claims direct descent from Lakota chief Crazy Horse.

Chasing Horse portrayed the young Lakota character Smiles a Lot in Kevin Costner's 1990 film Dances with Wolves. He has appeared in three TNT telefilms with First Nations actor Eric Schweig: The Broken Chain, Into the West, and Bury My Heart at Wounded Knee.

He is the father of model Quannah Chasinghorse. She was raised and taught by her single mother, Jody Potts-Joseph. Every summer, Chasinghorse and his daughter Quannah took powwow road trips to learn about her Lakota chief lineage and to help her prepare for her first modeling gig at Calvin Klein. Quannah has claimed she had nothing to do with Chasinghorse's actions.

== Legal issues ==
On July 6, 2015, after attempting to hold a Sun Dance ceremony in the area, Chasing Horse was banned by officials from the Fort Peck Indian Reservation in Montana as a "safety threat" because of charges of "human trafficking, sexual abuse, drug dealing, and intimidation of tribal members".

=== Arrest and prosecution ===
Chasing Horse was arrested on January 31, 2023, by officers of the North Las Vegas Police Department and Las Vegas Metropolitan Police Department. Officers conducted a SWAT team raid on the house that he shared with his five wives, located in North Las Vegas. According to a 50-page search warrant, Chasing Horse is alleged to have led a cult known as The Circle. Police report that they seized firearms, and that Chasing Horse was instructing his followers to "shoot it out" with law enforcement. He told them that if they failed, they should take suicide pills. As of April 2026, he is also charged with sexual assault in British Columbia and he has an arrest warrant in Alberta from the Tsuutʼina Nation Police.

The Las Vegas police, as stated in the search warrant, had found evidence of at least six claims of sexual abuse, with one victim reporting being assaulted at the age of 13. The allegations against Chasing Horse span multiple states, including Montana, South Dakota, and Nevada where he has lived for the past 10 years, and date to the early 2000s.

On January 30, 2026, a jury in Clark County, Nevada, convicted Chasing Horse on multiple charges related to the sexual assault of a minor. He was acquitted on other sexual assault charges. Chasing Horse had pleaded not guilty to all 21 charges. Prosecutors alleged that Chasing Horse used his status as a Lakota medicine man to sexually abuse Indigenous women and girls. Several of the convictions related to offenses involving a victim who was 14 years old at the time of the alleged abuse. On April 27, 2026, a day before his 50th birthday, Chasing Horse was sentenced to life imprisonment, with the possibility of parole after serving 37 years.

== Filmography ==
Year	Title	Role	Notes
1990	Dances with Wolves	Smiles a Lot	
1993	The Broken Chain	Young Joseph Brant	TV movie
2003	Dreamkeeper	Verdel	TV movie
2005	Into the West	Sleeping Bear	TV movie
2007	Bury My Heart at Wounded Knee	One Bull	TV movie
