= Stick and poke =

Traditional tattooing method

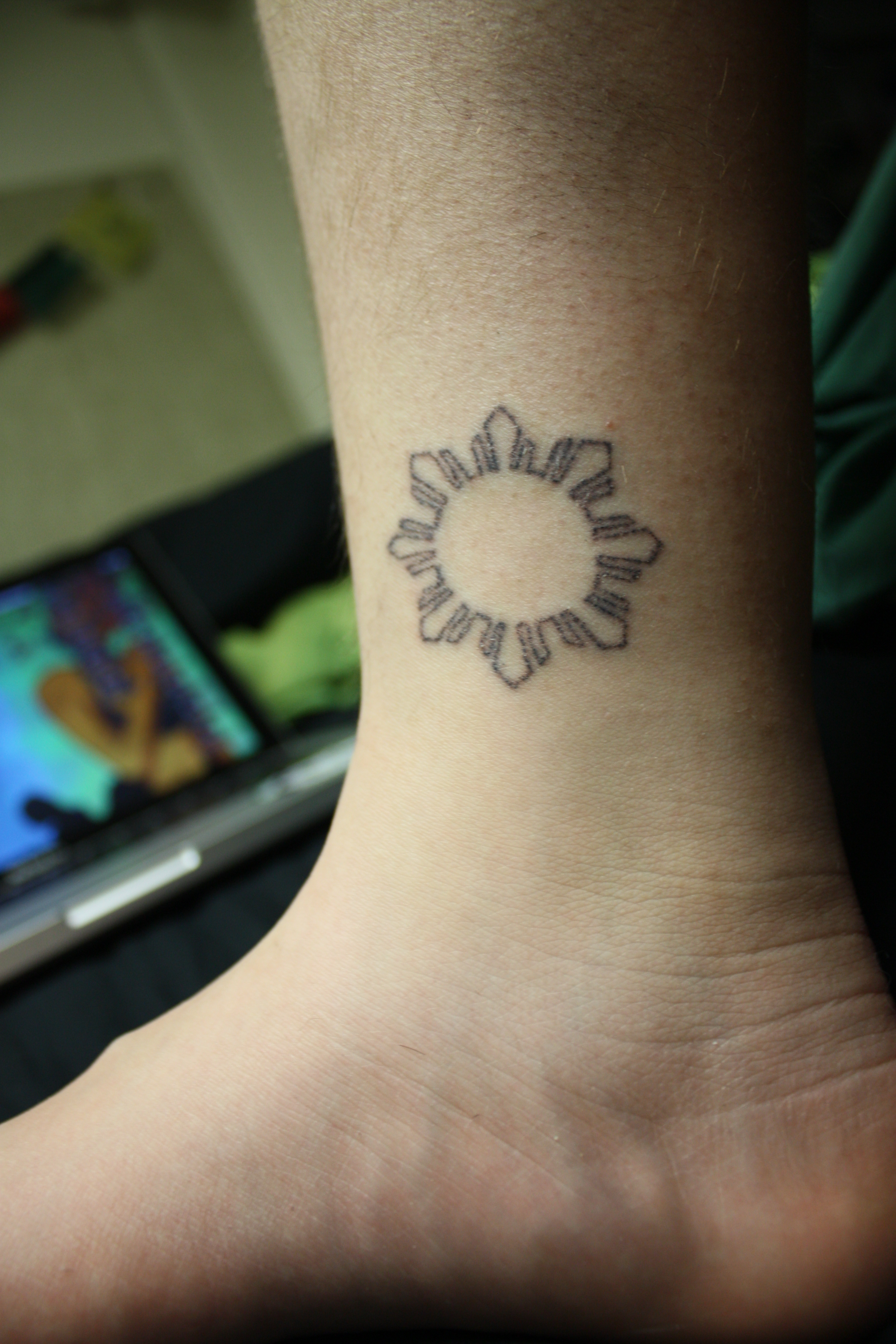
A stick-and-poke tattoo of a sun

Stick and poke, also known as hand poke, is a tattooing method which uses a single needle instead of a tattoo machine. Until the introduction of electric tattoo machines in the 19th century, hand-poking was a common tattooing method, alongside incision tattoos and subdermal tattooing.

== Practitioners ==
In the modern day, stick-and-poke tattoos are often performed by young adult amateurs. Minors who are unable to obtain parental consent for a professional tattoo may receive stick-and-poke tattoos from peers. Incarcerated people may also give and receive stick-and-poke tattoos, an association which sometimes gives them the name of prison tattoos. Other groups associated with stick-and-poke tattooing include punks and bikers.

Within the tattoo industry, stick and poke is often stigmatized as unhygienic or unprofessional possibly because of its popularity among lay people for at-home tattooing. Other tattoo artists dislike the trendiness of the resurgent practice. However, professionals who practice stick and poke praise its "softness", intimacy, and transgressive nature.

== Materials ==
Stick and poke tattooing requires a sharp object and a source of pigment; a handle may be attached to the sharp object for easier manipulation. Primitive tattoos were often performed with natural materials such as thorns or fish teeth, or with sharp implements made from metal, bone, or stone. Soot was sometimes used for pigment, as in the tattoos of Ötzi the Iceman.

Modern amateur stick and poke often uses a safety pin or sewing needle, and ink from a ballpoint pen. Professionals use tattoo ink, medical-grade tattoo needles, and stabilizer pens.

== See also ==
- Yantra tattooing
- Kakiniit tattooing
- Pict tattooing
