= Tavlugun =

Iñupiaq chin tattoo

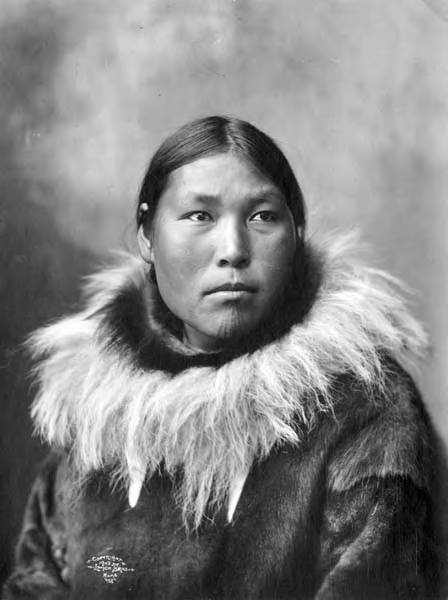
Photograph of an Inupiaq woman in Nome, Alaska, in 1903

The tavluġun is an Indigenous Iñupiaq chin tattoo worn by women.

Women received tavlugun after puberty when they were of an age to be married and demonstrated their inner strength and tolerance for pain.

Agnes Hailstone, a noted celebrity Kobuk River Inupiaq woman, known from the National Geographic series "Life Below Zero" refers to her chin tattoos as "Eskimo Beauty Marks" and received hers in 1997. At the time she was one of two women who wore them in Northwest Alaska. As a traditional artist, the wife of a Subsistence Hunter, a mother of 7, Agnes embraces her Inupiaq traditions and reflects them in herself, her ways and means of making a living from the land and her ties to her people.

Marjorie Tahbone (Inupiaq/Kiowa) is a tattoo artist dedicated to reviving customary Alaska Native tattoos such as tavlugun. She learned the Inupiaq techniques of tattooing and tattoo others.

== See also ==
- Face tattoos
- Kakiniit, Inuit face tattoos
- Yidįįłtoo, the facial tattoo of the Hän Gwich’in
