= Yidiiltoo =

Traditional tattoos of Hän Gwichʼin women

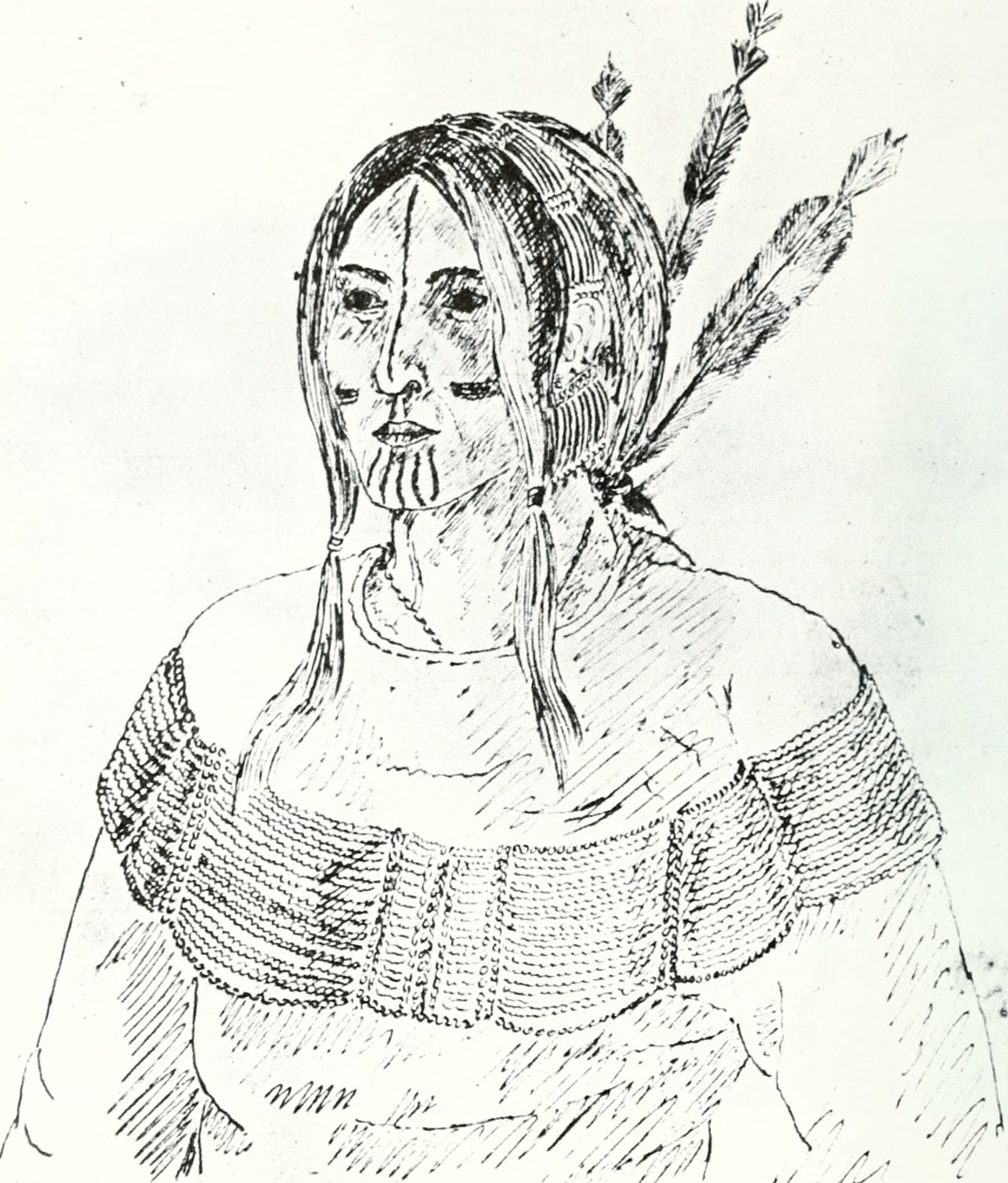
Woman with Yidįįłtoo

Yidiiltoo or Yidįįłtoo are the traditional face tattoos of Hän Gwich’in women, who are indigenous to Alaska and Canada.

== History ==
The practice dates back at least 10,000 years. Traditionally, Hän Gwich’in girls receive their first tattoos between the ages of 12 and 14, often at first menstruation, as a passage ritual.

European missionaries of the 1800s and 1900s banned the practice, along with other cultural traditions.

In the modern day, some indigenous girls and women have advocated for reclaiming the tradition.

== Description ==
Typical markings include vertical lines from the lower lip that extend to beneath the chin. According to tattoo anthropologist Lars Krutak, the width of the lines and the spacing between them were traditionally associated with each of the nine groups of Hän Gwich’in. Girls would be tattooed to identify their group.

Other markings may be created on the temple or cheeks.

== Method of application ==
The traditional method is a stick-and-poke using needles made from bird bones. Some modern practitioners use tattoo needles.

== Appropriation ==
Some non-indigenous people wear temporary markings, makeup or jewelry that mimics the traditional Yidįįłtoo.

== See also ==
- Kakiniit
- Tavlugun
