= Quannah Chasinghorse =

American model and activist

Quannah ChasingHorse
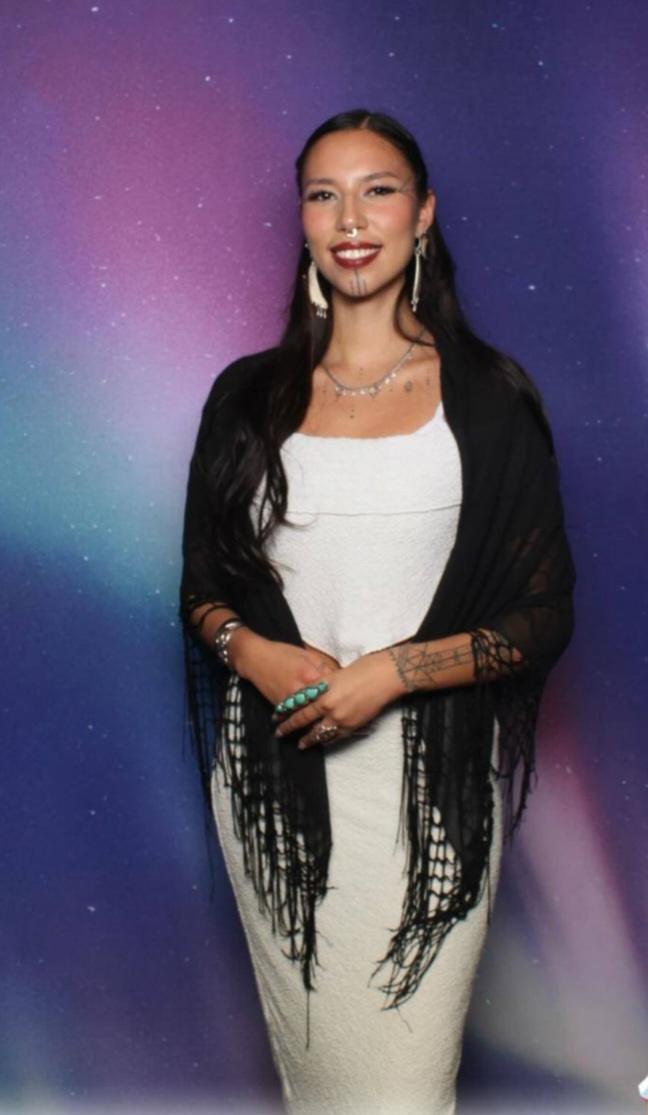
- Fairbanks Native Association Holiday In Whoville Holiday Party 2025
- Born: Quannah Rose Potts ChasingHorse; June 6, 2002 (age 24)
- Occupation: Model
- Years active: 2019–present
- Height: 5 ft 9 in (175 cm)
- Parents: Nathan Lee Chasing His Horse (father); Jody Potts-Joseph (mother)

Quannah ChasingHorse is an Indigenous American model and environmental activist from Eagle Village, Alaska, United States. She has appeared on the 2020 Teen Vogue list of Top 21 under 21. She has narrated several nature documentaries, including Bad River (2024) and The American Southwest (2025).

== Career ==
ChasingHorse was interested in modeling and fashion from a young age but, due to the lack of Indigenous representation she saw in magazines and fashion shows, did not think it was feasible as a career. Her modeling career began with Calvin Klein in 2020. She has since been featured on the covers of Vogue Mexico, Vogue Japan, V Magazine, Elle, and Porter.

She celebrates indigenous fashion and promotes sustainable indigenous brands. Her red carpet look at the Gilded Age-themed Met Gala in May 2022 went viral on social media. The Navajo-inspired outfit was created by Peter Dundas, Tabitha Simmons, Gucci Westman, and 2006 Miss Navajo Nation Jocelyn Billy-Upshaw, a family friend. Refinery29 called her the "breakout star" of the event. That same week, she walked her first runway at New York Fashion Week.

In March 2023, ChasingHorse was named one of USA TODAY's Women of the Year honorees for her advocacy of "issues of environmentalism, sustainability, women's rights and Native American rights."

In 2024 she was co-nominated, along with Edward Norton, in the category Best Narration by the Critics' Choice Documentary Awards for narrating the film Bad River.

== Personal life ==
Born on the Navajo Nation in Tuba City, Arizona, ChasingHorse is Hän Gwichʼin of the Native Village of Eagle in Eagle Village, Alaska, on her mother Jody Potts-Joseph's side. Her biological father is Nathan Chasing Horse (Sicangu-Oglala Lakota from South Dakota). Her paternal family claims direct descent from Lakota chief Crazy Horse.

ChasingHorse spent her early childhood with her mother in Arizona, Mongolia (where her maternal grandparents were Christian missionaries), and New Mexico before the family returned to her maternal homelands in Alaska when she was six. She and her two brothers were raised to hunt, fish, and dog mush, by their single mother, who taught them a subsistence lifestyle. She lived in Kenny Lake and then Fairbanks. She attended Effie Kokrine Charter School.

ChasingHorse is a fourth-generation land protector for the Arctic National Wildlife Refuge as part of the Alaska Wilderness League. She has spoken on climate action and indigenous rights at a number of events and panels.

== Filmography ==
=== Documentary ===
Filmography: Web series
Year	Title	Role	Ref.
2024	Bad River	Narrator	
2025	The American Southwest	Narrator	

=== Short films ===
Filmography: Web series
Year	Title	Role	Notes	Ref.
2022	Walking Two Worlds	Co-Subject	Documentary Part of: The North Face Presents	

== Awards and nominations ==
Filmography: Web series
Year	Award	Category	Work	Result
2022	Santa Monica Film Festival	Best Documentary Short	Walking Two Worlds	Won
2024	Critics' Choice Documentary Awards	Best Narration	Bad River	Nominee
2025	Sierra Club	Trail Blazer Award	Environmentalism	Honoree
