= Richard Hoffer =

American sports journalist and author

Richard Hoffer is an American sports journalist and author. He was a longtime Sports Illustrated staff writer, best known for his writing on boxing.

He has contributed to the Los Angeles Times, The Alliance Review, and Deadspin. His 1984 article about Mary Lou Retton won The Sporting News's Best Reporting Story of 1984 and was included in the Library of America's The Great American Sports Page, an anthology of sports columns.

== Books ==
Hoffer is the author of five books. His 1998 book about Mike Tyson, A Savage Business: The Comeback and Comedown of Mike Tyson, which chronicled Tyson's release from prison and subsequent return to the ring, was named one of the top 100 sports books of all time by Sports Illustrated.

== Bibliography ==
- A Savage Business: The Comeback and Comedown of Mike Tyson (1998)
- Jackpot Nation: Rambling and Gambling Across Our Landscape of Luck (2007)
- Something in the Air: American Passion and Defiance in the 1968 Mexico City Olympics (2009)
- Wooden: Basketball & Beyond: The Official UCLA Retrospective (2011)
- Bouts of Mania: Ali, Frazier, and Foreman—and an America on the Ropes (2014)
