= Robert A. Weiss =

American dermatologist

- Occupation: Dermatologist
- Known for: Laser dermatology, phlebology, vein treatments

Robert A. Weiss is an American dermatologist who has served as the president of the American Society for Laser Medicine and Surgery, the American Society for Dermatologic Surgery, and the American College of Phlebology. He is the director and co-founder of the Maryland Dermatology, Laser, Skin and Vein Institute in Hunt Valley, Maryland.

== Education ==
Weiss received a Bachelor of Arts from Columbia University before earning an MD from the Johns Hopkins University School of Medicine in 1978. He completed a dermatology residency at Johns Hopkins from 1980 to 1983, followed by a dermatologic research fellowship in the Immunology Division at the National Institutes of Health from 1983 to 1984. Weiss is board certified by the American Board of Dermatology and has prepared examination questions for the board.

== Career and research ==
Weiss established the Maryland Dermatology, Laser, Skin and Vein Institute in 1985 and serves as its director. He also serves as the Fellowship Director for the American Society for Dermatologic Surgery (ASDS) cosmetic fellowship program, mentoring dermatology fellows in advanced energy and injection treatments. Weiss was an associate professor of dermatology at Johns Hopkins University School of Medicine from 1986 to 2013, after which he became an adjunct associate professor of dermatology at the University of Maryland School of Medicine and a affiliate of the University of Maryland Medical Center.

His clinical research focuses on evaluating novel lasers and light sources for the treatment of photoaging, vascular lesions, and pigmented lesions. Weiss conducts research as a principal investigator for phase II and phase III FDA clinical trials concerning botulinum toxins, dermal fillers, and energy-based devices, and his trials have supported FDA clearances for lasers used to reverse photoaging. He also developed non-invasive treatments for varicose veins, researching the efficacy of endovenous laser occlusion and foam sclerotherapy as alternatives to surgical ligation and stripping.

Weiss served as president of the American Society for Laser Medicine and Surgery from 2015 to 2016, and was president of the American Society for Dermatologic Surgery in 2008; he is also a past president of the American College of Phlebology. He has served on the board of directors of the International Society for Dermatologic Surgery and has served multiple years on the board of directors of the American Academy of Dermatology. Castle Connolly has recognized him as a Top Doctor for over 20 consecutive years.

Weiss has authored over 150 peer-reviewed medical articles. Since 1993, he has served as an associate or contributing editor for the journal Dermatologic Surgery, and he also sits on the editorial board of Lasers in Surgery and Medicine. He has co-authored several medical textbooks on phlebology and laser devices, and holds multiple U.S. patents related to tissue compression and endovenous vein treatments.

Weiss has provided dermatologic commentary for 20/20, The Today Show, and Baltimore local news broadcasts. He has been quoted regarding cosmetic procedures in Harper's Bazaar, The New York Times, and The Baltimore Sun.

== Publications ==
=== Textbooks ===
- Weiss RA, Feied C, and Weiss MA. Vein Diagnosis and Treatment: A Comprehensive Approach, McGraw-Hill Inc, New York, NY, 2001. Hardcover, 1st ed, 350pp ISBN 0070692017
- Rigel DS, Weiss RA, Lim HW, Dover JS. Photoaging (Basic and Clinical Dermatology) CRC Press, 2004. Hardcover 1st ed, 416 pp ISBN 0824754506
- Weiss RA, Goldman MP. Advanced Techniques in Dermatologic Surgery, Elsevier, Hardcover, 398pp ISBN 9780824754051
- Weiss RA, Guex JJ, Goldman M. Sclerotherapy Expert Consult: Treatment of Varicose and Telangiectatic Leg Veins, Saunders, 2011, Text with DVD, Online and Print, 5th ed, 416pp ISBN 9780323073677
- Weiss RA, Weiss MA, Beasley KL. Sclerotherapy and Vein Treatment. McGraw-Hill Inc, New York, NY, 2012. Hardcover, 2nd ed, 230pp ISBN 9780071485425
- Goldman MP, Fitzpatrick RE, Ross VE, Kilmer SL, Weiss RA. Lasers and Energy Devices for the Skin, CRC Press, 2013. Hardcover 2nd ed, 400pp ISBN 1841849332

=== Patents ===
- Thermal Quenching of Tissue
- Method and Apparatus for Applying Energy to Biological Tissue Including the Use of Tumescent Tissue Compression
- B1 Method for Applying Energy to Biological Tissue Including the Use of Tumescent Tissue Compression With Mitchel P. Goldman, Robert A. Weiss, Arthur W. Zikorus, James G. Chandler
- B2 Method and Apparatus for Applying Energy to Biological Tissue Including the Use of Tumescent Tissue Compression With Mitchel P. Goldman, Robert A. Weiss, Arthur W. Zikorus, James G. Chandler
- Endovenous Closure of Varicose Veins with Mid-Infrared Laser With Mitchel P. Goldman, Robert A. Weiss, Eric B. Taylor, Don Johnson, Ignacio Cespedes
- Endovenous Closure of Varicose Veins with Mid Infrared Laser With David R. Hennings, Mitchel P. Goldman, Robert A. Weiss, Eric B. Taylor, Don Johnson, Ignacio Cespedes
- Endovenous Laser Treatment for Varicose Veins With David R. Hennings, Mitchel P. Goldman, Robert A. Weiss, Eric B Taylor, Don Johnson
