= Roberta Rosenthal Kwall =

American law professor

Roberta Rosenthal Kwall is the Raymond P. Niro Professor at DePaul University College of Law. In 2006, Chicago Magazine highlighted Kwall as one of the Ten Best Law Professors in Illinois.

== Career ==
Roberta Rosenthal Kwall is an American law professor, author, and lecturer. She teaches at DePaul University College of Law and received her A.B. in Religious Studies from Brown University and her JD from the University of Pennsylvania Law School. She also has a master's degree in Jewish Studies. Kwall has written extensively on author's rights, copyright law, creativity theory, Jewish law and Jewish culture, and lectures extensively on these topics internationally.

She is one of the leading experts on the doctrine of moral rights, and also one of a small number of female law professors in the United States who writes on Jewish law and Jewish culture. Professor Kwall is the author of over thirty-five academic articles and book chapters on these topics. She has also written popular pieces for JTA, The Jewish Journal, The Forward, The Jewish Week, Commentary Magazine, and The Chicago Tribune.

One of Kwall's seminal law review articles, "Inspiration and Innovation: The Intrinsic Dimension of the Artistic Soul," asserts that U.S. copyright law relies solely on the theory of economic incentive as motivation for creativity, resulting in a flawed system of legal protection for authors' works as compared to other legal systems that incorporate moral rights based on internal motivations for human creativity that have nothing to do with money. This piece also explores creativity theory from a Jewish and Christian perspective.

Kwall's publications also include several casebooks in Property Law and Intellectual Property published by Foundation Press. In addition, she has written three monographs: "Remix Judaism: Preserving Tradition in a Diverse World," (Rowman & Littlefield, 2020); "The Myth of the Cultural Jew: Culture and Law in Jewish Tradition" (Oxford U. Press, 2015) and "The Soul of Creativity" (Stanford U. Press, 2010.) She is also a co-editor of The Oxford Handbook of Jewish Law, for which she wrote the chapter on lawmaking in the Conservative movement. Currently, Kwall is working on a book for Bloomsbury Press about polarization of the American Jewish community.
