= Kakiniit =

Inuit tattoos

A woman from Southampton Island with tattoos; date unknown.
Inuk woman in 1903

Kakiniit (Inuktitut: ᑲᑭᓐᓃᑦ [kɐ.ki.niːt]; sing. kakiniq, ᑲᑭᓐᓂᖅ) are the traditional tattoos of the Inuit of the North American Arctic. The practice is done almost exclusively among women, with women exclusively tattooing other women with the tattoos for various purposes. Men could also receive tattoos but these were often much less extensive than the tattoos a woman would receive. Facial tattoos are individually referred to as tunniit (ᑐᓃᑦ), and would mark an individual's transition to womanhood. The individual tattoos bear unique meaning to Inuit women, with each individual tattoo carrying symbolic meaning. However, in Inuinnaqtun, kakiniq refers to facial tattoos.

Historically, the practice was done for aesthetic, medicinal purposes, part of the Inuit religion, and to ensure the individual access to the afterlife. Despite persecution by Christian missionaries during the 20th century, the practice has seen a modern revival by organizations such as the Inuit Tattoo Revitalization Project. Many Inuit women wear the tattoos as a source of pride in their Inuit culture.

== Etymology ==
Kakiniq (singular) or kakiniit (plural) is an Inuktitut term which refers to Inuit tattoos, while the term tunniit specifically refers to women's facial tattoos. The terms are rendered in Inuktitut syllabics as ᑲᑭᓐᓃᑦ (Kakinniit), ᑲᑭᓐᓂᖅ (Kakinniq), and ᑐᓃᑦ (Tuniit).

The Proto-Inuit-Yupik root *kaki- means 'pierce or prick'; this is etymon for the Iñupiaq (North Alaskan Inuit) kakinʸɨq* 'tattoo', Eastern Canadian Inuktitut kakiniq 'tattoo', West Greenlandic kakiuʀniʀit 'tattoos', and Tunumiit (East Greenlandic) 'kaɣiniq 'tattoo'. The root kaki- also means tattoo in Inuvialuktun (Western Canadian Inuktitut). The Proto-Inuit word *tupə(nəq) 'tattoo' is the etymology of Eastern Canadian Inuktitut tunniq 'woman's facial tattoo'. This might go back to Proto-Inuit-Yupik-Unangan *cumi-n 'ornamental dots'.

== Description ==
Kakiniit are tattoos done on the body, and tunniit are tattoos done on the face. They served a variety of symbolic purposes. Commonly, the tattooed portions would consist of the arms, hands, breasts, and thighs. In some extreme cases, some women would tattoo their entire bodies. According to filmmaker Alethea Arnaquq-Baril, the stomach area was scarcely tattooed, with her remarking that she had never heard of the practice being done in that area of the body. The markings are done on women and the practice of tattooing was done by women. Men would not receive the same tattoos as women; the tattoos men would receive would be much less extensive than female tattoos, and served a similar purpose to amulets. However, there were reports of men who were raised female and received tunniit who later were wed as second wives. The patterns would consist of dots, zig-zags, shapes, and lines. The practice of facial tattooing is considered a part of coming into womanhood for Inuit women. Women were unable to marry until their faces were tattooed, and the tattoos meant that they had learned essential skills for later in life.

Designs would vary depending on the region. Each individual pattern has symbolic meaning to its wearer, and served a variety of purposes. Some are often given to commemorate a significant life event. Y-shaped markings represent essential tools used during the seal hunt, V-shaped markings on the forehead represent entering womanhood, stripes on the chin represent a woman's first period, chest tattoos are given after childbirth and symbolize motherhood, and markings on the arms and fingers reference to the legend of Sedna. Due to persecution of the practice during the 20th century, and the subsequent loss of the meaning that some of the tattoos had embodied, modern wearers often invent new meanings for the tattoos as they reclaim the practice.

=== Mythology ===
Inuit legends regarding the meaning of the individual tattoos refer to the sea goddess Sedna who, while being thrown overboard by her angry father, had her fingers chopped off, the disembodied digits would become sea animals. Tattoos on the hands and arms refer to the story, representing where her hands were cut. Wearers of kakiniit in Inuit tradition would ensure that in the afterlife, the woman would be able to go to a place of happiness and good things. According to tradition, women who did not have hand tattoos would be denied access to the afterlife by Sedna, while women without facial tattoos were sent to the land of Noqurmiut, the "land of the crestfallen" where women would spend an eternity with smoke coming from their throat and their head hanging downwards.

=== Process ===
Tattooists were usually older women who had experience in embroidery. Traditionally, the practice was done through sinew from caribou that was spun into a thread and was soaked in a combination of qulliq lampblack and seal suet. The thread would then be poked under the skin through the use of a needle made of bone, wood, or steel. Other tools used historically were pokers, and knives, all these tools would be held in a seal-intestine skin bag. Once the tattoo had been completed, the tattooed area would be sterilized with a mixture of urine and soot.

In modern times, the practice is primarily done through the use of a tattoo machine and its use of needles and ink. Both practices, the poking method and the machine method, are used in modern times, with the traditional poking method employed by those who wish for the practice to be done traditionally.

== History ==
Of the Qilakitsoq mummies found in Greenland, 5 of the 6 women have tattoos. The designs are similar to those photographed in modern times. Radiocarbon dating yielded a probable time of death of these mummies to around 1475 with a margin of error of about ±50 years.

According to anthropologist Lars Krutak, Inuit practices of tattooing remained unchanged for millennia. Evidence of prehistoric tattooing found on Alaska's St. Lawrence Island resembled tattoos found on Greenlandic women in the 1880s. The practice was widespread and unchanged prior to colonization. On top of making individuals happy, the practice was done for a variety of reasons historically, some for acupuncture or as pain relief, beautification, and shamanistic reasons. With the introduction of Western medicine and fashion, the former reasons fell out of favour among Inuit, the third reason was extirpated through pressure from missionaries.

Mother and daughter Paulette Aneroluk and Eva Kokiloka in the 1940s. The mother is tattooed and the daughter is not.

The practice of kakiniit was banned by the Catholic Church and missionaries during the early 20th century, who saw the practice as evil due to its non-Christian nature. Traditionally a source of pride and a rite of passage for Inuit women, the practice was considered shamanistic to the Catholic missionaries and the communities that they worked to convert. Biblical passages forbidding the practice of tattooing served as additional pressure to forbid the practice. The efforts of Anglican missionary Edmund Peck, who was fluent in Inuktitut, were particularly effective in extirpating Inuit cultural and religious practices, including kakiniit. However, the practice was not entirely extirpated during the time, and the practice went underground.

=== Resurgence ===
The practice has seen a recent resurgence due to increased awareness and revitalization efforts, in addition to concerns regarding the extirpation of the practice. The Kalaaleq (West Greenlandic Inuk) tattooer and researcher Maya Sialuk Jacobsen spearheaded the reintroduction of traditional tattooing and the use of traditional tattooing techniques in Greenland after founding Inuit Tattoo Traditions in 2014 and played an instrumental role in founding the Tupik Mi traditional tattoo revitalization project in Alaska the following year. In the Canadian arctic, organizations such as the Inuit Tattoo Revitalization Project, founded in 2017 and led by Angela Hovak Johnson, serve to revive the tradition and bring the practice back in Inuit communities. Johnson started the organization when she found out that the practice was to die out with the last Inuk woman with facial tattoos. The practice was brought to further public knowledge following the release of the film Atanarjuat: The Fast Runner. Inuk filmmaker Alethea Arnaquq-Baril's 2010 film, Tunniit: Retracing the Lines of Inuit Tattoos, documents the history behind the practice. Arnaquq-Baril interviewed 58 elders representing 10 Inuit communities during the course of the film. Many Inuit figures bear traditional tattoos to showcase their embracing of their heritage, including: Celina Kalluk, Lucie Idlout, Angela Hovak Johnston, Laakkuluk Williamson Bathory, Nancy Mike, and Johnny Issaluk. Member of Parliament Mumilaaq Qaqqaq, who was elected in 2019 and representing the riding of Nunavut, wore traditional facial tattoos.

== Gallery ==
Inuk woman in 1903 and 1904

Inuk woman in 1904

Inuk woman in 1916

Inuk woman in 1937

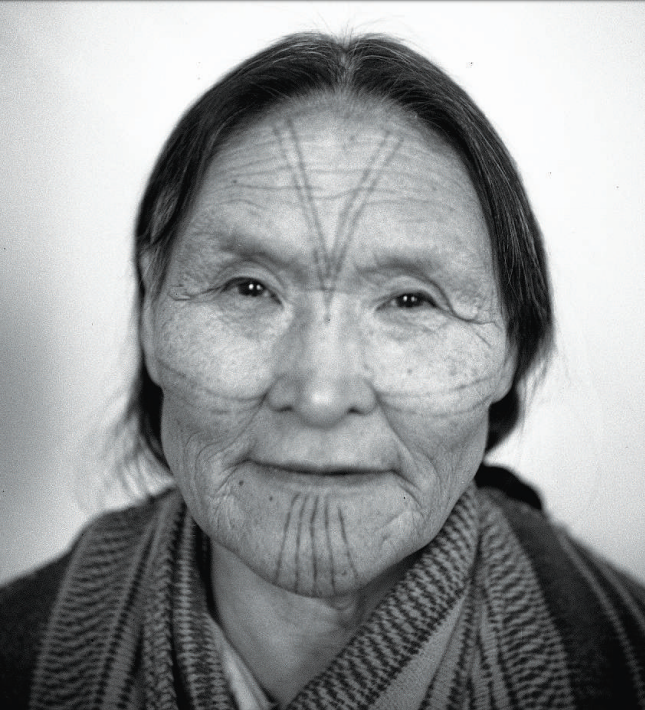
Inuk woman in 1945

Inuk woman in 1958

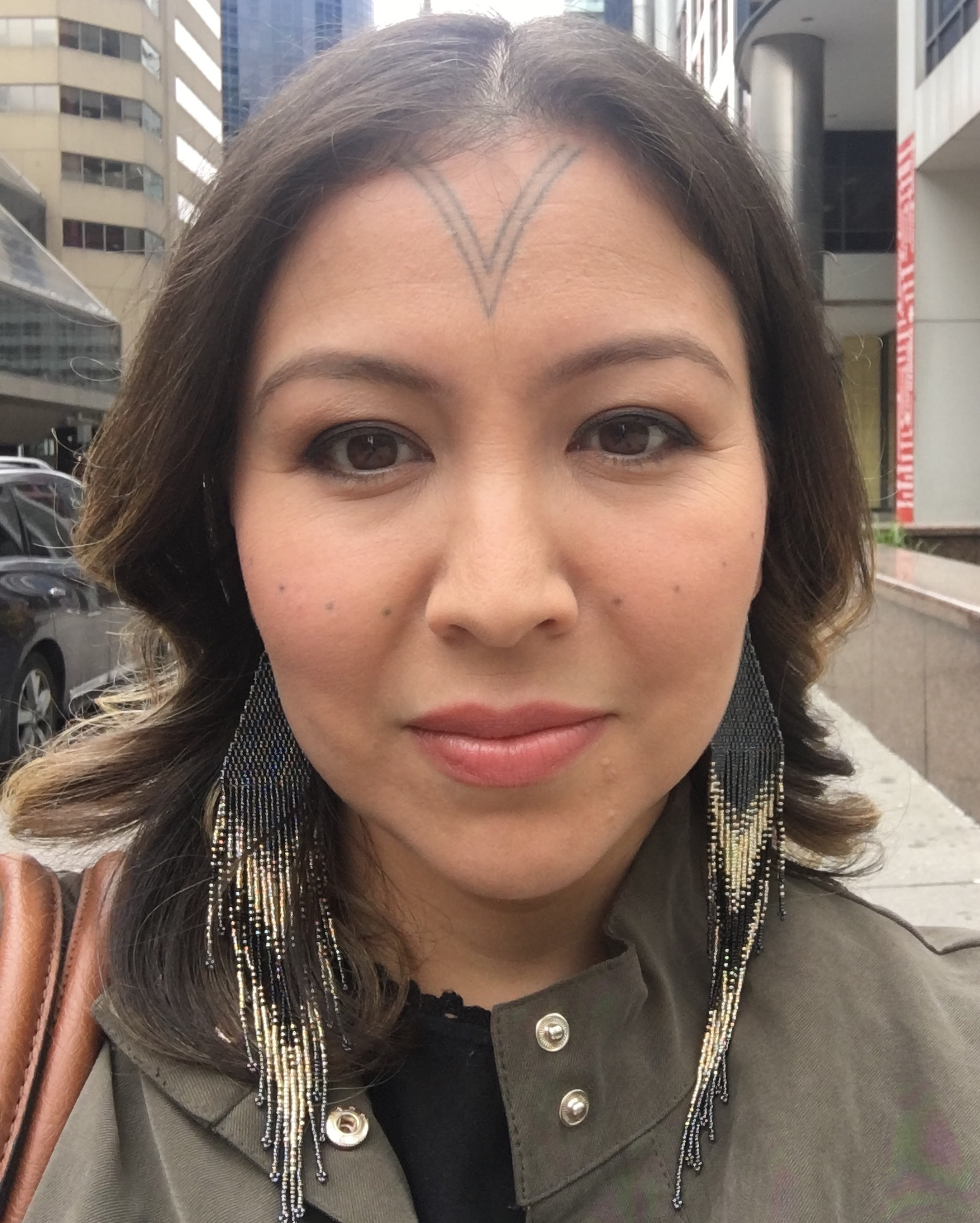
Inuk woman in 2018

=== Kakiniit in art ===
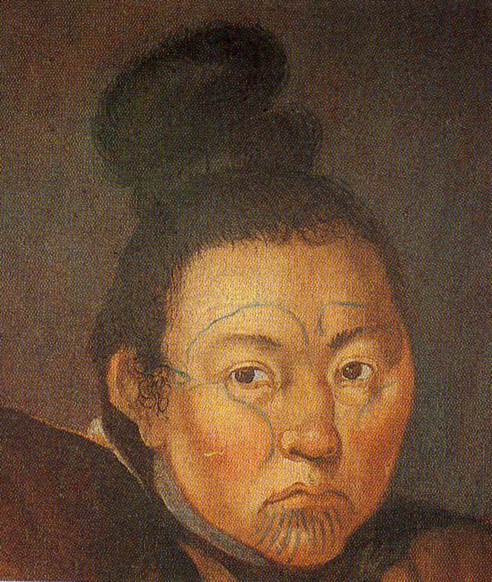
Painting of an Inuk woman in 1654

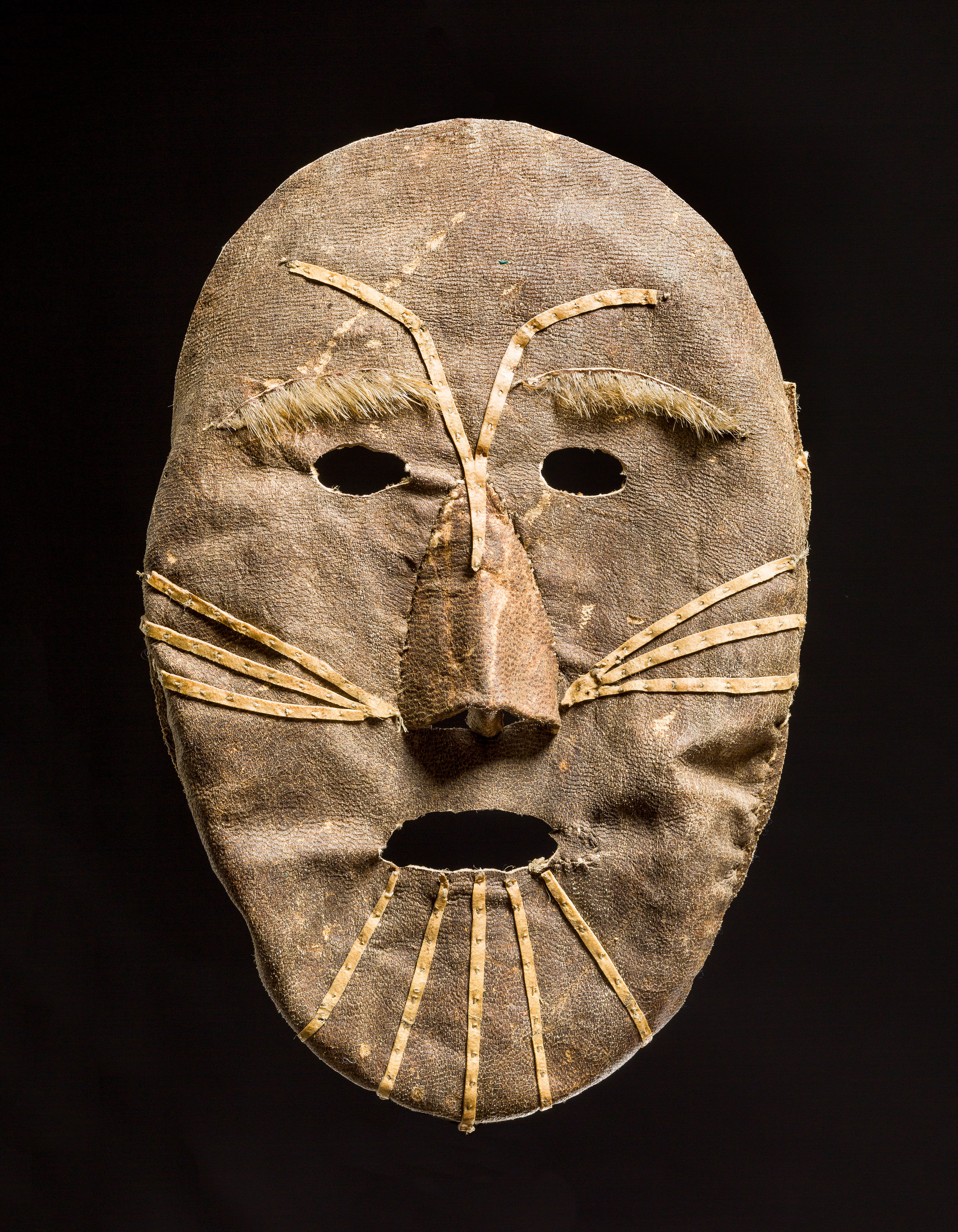
A mask acquired during Fifth Thule Expedition (1921–1924)

== See also ==
- History of tattooing
- Tavlugun
- Yidįįłtoo are the traditional face tattoos of the Hän Gwich’in.
