= Television in Seychelles =

Television was introduced to Seychelles on 31 December 1982. There is only one company providing terrestrial television services, the Seychelles Broadcasting Corporation, which also oversees relayed foreign channels. Digital terrestrial television was tested in late 2017 and started regular broadcasts on 28 June 2018, while analogue signals were switched off in 2020. There are three pay-TV companies: DStv, Intelvision and Cable & Wireless Seychelles. This last company has one private local channel, Télésesel, established in 2017.

== History ==
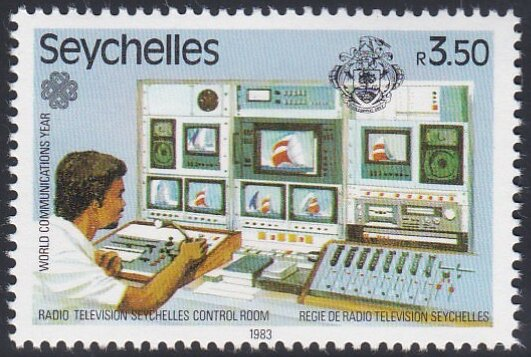
A 1983 stamp depicting the television control room of the newly launched Radio Television Seychelles television service

The first television broadcasts were conducted by Radio Television Seychelles (RTS) on 31 December 1982, delivering three hours of programming a day Fridays through Sundays. On 27 August 1983, RTS technicians installed a television antenna at the La Passe School in Silhouette Island, expanding its coverage. By the mid-80s, the amount of hours for television programming increased; while seven-day broadcasts only started in 1989, followed in with the installation of a satellite dish at Hermitage which enabled RTS to relay CNN International. RTS was renamed SBC in 1992.

The first attempt at launching a private television channel began in June 2006, when Intelvision launched Intelvision One. A South African company, Digital Sky Investments, eyed the creation of a Southern Africa Direct travel channel which would cater to 25 countries, including Seychelles

Tests for SBC 2 began on the digital terrestrial platform in late 2017, simultaneously, SBC started distributing the first set-top-boxes. Full digital terrestrial broadcasts began on 28 June 2018. At the end of July 2020, SBC confirmed the cessation of analogue terrestrial broadcasts; most of the equipment was over 25 years old and was no longer in its operating lifespan.

TéléSesel launched on Cable & Wireless Seychelles in July 2017, entirely in high definition (before SBC converted to such format) and with an entirely-local schedule. The creation of Télésesel, as well as SBC 2 (which aimed at having a fully-local schedule at launch), led to private production houses increasing the amount of creole programming.

== Terrestrial television ==
SBC owns three television channels (SBC 1, SBC 2 and SBC 3) and is also in charge of distributing ten international channels on the terrestrial platform (TV5Monde Afrique, TV5 Monde Style, Tivi5 Monde Afrique, Al Jazeera English, Deutsche Welle, CGTN, CGTN French, NHK World-Japan, France 24 French and France 24 English).

== Subscription television ==
Intelvision started its services on 9 October 2004, sourcing channels from DStv. Although the agreement with the South African provider ended in 2007, all DStv channels were only removed in 2014, a decision which infuriated subscribers. Cable & Wireless Seychelles, owned by Liberty Global, also provides TV services. In July 2017 (alongside the launch of Télésesel), it launched its mobile TV service.

DStv launched the DStv Stream service in the country by partnering with Airtel Seychelles in November 2024.
