= List of ambassadors of Seychelles to China =

Coordinates: 39.919686°N 116.451590°E

Ambassador of Seychelles to China
- Incumbent; Vivianne Fock-Tave since 22 October 2015
- Inaugural holder: Callixte François-Xavier d'Offay
- Formation: 10 December 1983

The Seychellense Ambassador in Beijing is the official representative of the Government of in Victoria, Seychelles to the Government of the People's Republic of China. He is Non-Resident Ambassador to Seoul (South Korea)

== List of representatives ==
Diplomatic agreement/designated/Diplomatic accreditation	Ambassador	Observations	List of presidents of Seychelles	Premier of the People's Republic of China	Term end
30 June 1976		The Seychelles became independent and the governments in Victoria, Seychelles and Beijing established diplomatic relations.	James Mancham	Hua Guofeng	
10 December 1983	Callixte François-Xavier d'Offay		France-Albert René	Zhao Ziyang	1995
6 May 1998	Louis Sylvestre Radegonde	(* 1950), Seychelles joined the diplomatic service, December 1976, From 15 July 2008 – 12 July 2012 Secretary General of the Indian Ocean Commission High Commissioner of Seychelles to Kuala Lumpur Malaysia	France-Albert René	Zhu Rongji	
May 2007	fr:Philippe Le Gall	Philippe Le Gall, first Seychelles resident ambassador to China, Beijing,	James Michel	Wen Jiabao	1 April 2015
22 October 2015	Vivianne Fock-Tave		James Michel	Li Keqiang	
23 April 2024	Anne Lafortune				
2026	Jacqueline Moustache-Belle				

China–Seychelles relations
