= The Bobodioufs =

- Genre: Comedy drama
- Created by: Patrick Martinet
- Country of origin: Burkina Faso
- Original language: French
- No. of episodes: 200

Production
- Running time: approx. 30 min
- Production company: Frame society

Original release
- Release: 2000 – 2015

The Bobodioufs was a humorous television series written and directed by Patrick Martinet. With more than 150 episodes of laughter and entertainment, Bobodioufs was produced by Frame society in Burkina Faso from 2000 to 2015. At the time, it was the most watched television series in Francophone Africa.

== History ==
Created and produced by Patrick Martinet and Adjaratou Dembele, the series was broadcast by French media Cooperation Agency (CFI), TV5, the Rtb and several other African channels. Before, it was of little stories, news items daily and an episode corresponded to a daily practice, one of those stories. After by cons, it has become a soap opera with twenty episodes twice a year. This series chronicles of everyday life in Bobo Dioulasso, Burkina Faso's second largest city. The production was filmed with local actors with storylines featuring miseries, joys, all with humor. This also explains its success. "The stories have their origins in everyday life. People are concerned because it can happen to everyone."

== Origin ==
Siriki is the little brother of souke's friend, a musician from Burkina Faso. Their first encounter was in the kingdom of Abu. He was reacting and they said things were so much laughter around them. Then, the director was inspired by these teasers.

In 2004, Patrick Martinet explained the problems that already existed due to the closure of CFI-TV, the main customer. This meant that there was about 50% less on broadcasting rights. It was therefore necessary to make an effort this time before finding a system that would allow you to restart properly.

== Members ==
The Bobodioufs, the series that made laugh millions of people in Africa and beyond, has met considerable success worldwide. The main actors are Siriki and Souké.

- Pauline Ouattara
- Frédéric Soré "Siriki"
- Mahamoudou Tiendrébéogo "Souké"
- André Bougouma "Tonton Brama"
- Fati Millogo "Tanti Abi".
