= Monaco Info =

State-owned television channel in Monaco

- Country: Monaco
- Broadcast area: Monaco

Programming
- Language: French

Ownership
- Owner: Government of Monaco

History
- Launched: 27 November 1995; 30 years ago

Links
- Website: www.monacoinfo.com

Monaco Info is a Monegasque television channel focused on proximity and created under the name Monaco à la Une, in 1995. Official communications organ of the Monegasque State, it follows the transformation in October 1993 of Télé Monte-Carlo (TMC) into a French thematic channel.

== History ==
From September 1993, TMC entrusted the production of its ten-minute television news to Euronews, which opted for more international and French information, to the detriment of local information. Monaco à la Une, newly launched, aimed to offer a daily news bulletin to cover official news about the Prince and life in Monaco. On 27 November 1995, the first edition of Monaco à la Une aired on MC Cable's local channel, airing the same bulletin four hours a day, at 10am, 12:30pm, 7:30pm and 10pm. In 2003, the channel was renamed Monaco Info. On 14 January 2013, the channel started broadcasting in high definition.

A weekend edition was added in the autumn period of 2023. In order to boost its digital content, the channel started producing content for social media platforms, Facebook, X and more recently TikTok.

In December 2024, the Government of Monaco announced a merger of TVMonaco and fellow Monaco-based channel Monaco Info, which at the time was scheduled for September 2025. This currently includes the possibility of the successive broadcaster retaining its membership as the only Monégasque member of TV5Monde, after it was previously proposed by the former Minister of State, Didier Guillaume that the new broadcaster would not retain TVMonaco's share of ownership of the network, before his passing in January 2025.

In October 2025, French newspaper Nice-Matin reported that the merger had been pushed ahead to 2026 at the earliest. This followed an audit presented to the National Council of Monaco on 7 October 2025 by the current Minister of State, Christophe Mirmand, where he stated that he aimed to reduce costs by merging the two broadcasters together and confirming that changes can be expected to begin sometime in 2026. An announcement was due to be made by the Monégasque government in January 2026, however no further updates have yet been released as of March 2026.

== Status ==
As an official communications body, Monaco Info is managed by the Communications Directorate of the Principality of Monaco, itself attached to the Minister of State. Its role is to disseminate to the public information relating to the activity of the Princely Government (Prince Albert II, Princely Palace, Government and Parliament) and to economic, sporting or cultural events taking place in Monaco (National Day, Sainte Dévote, Formula 1 Grand Prix, Monte-Carlo Rally, Monte-Carlo tennis tournament, Mare Nostrum, television festival). This information is also the subject of a weekly retrospective entitled Monacoscope and broadcast every Sunday on TMC.

Monaco Info, a public channel financed by the State, is broadcast on Monaco cable, on the web and on social networks. Patricia Navarro has held the position of editor-in-chief since 2012. The communications director has been Geneviève Berti since 2016.

== Programming ==
Its programs, centered on political, economical, cultural or sports news, are developed around the daily news service, broadcast at 7pm and later repeated.

Its main programs are:

- Le JT, daily news program;
- Monacoscope, weekly news bulletin in Italian, German, English and sign language covering the key news of the week (also broadcast every Sunday on TMC);
- Actusport, sports magazine;
- Asphalte, automobile magazine;
- Backstage, musical magazine;
- Cinéma, new cinema releases of the week;
- Coach U, fitness magazine;
- Découvertes, travel magazine;
- Monacook, cooking magazine;
- Sunshine, yoga magazine;
- Tout l’art du cinéma, cinephile magazine;
- Trésors d’archives, history magazine;
- Regard extérieur, interview magazine;
- Rencontre, portrait in images;
- L’Émission, magazine on AS Monaco;
- Rendez-vous à Monaco, interviews and gatherings.
