= Jacqueline Moustache-Belle =

- Born: 1961; Seychelles
- Occupations: Politician, film director

Jacqueline Moustache-Belle (born 1961) is a filmmaker, broadcaster, and politician from the Seychelles. She served as mayor of Victoria, the capital city of the Seychelles, from 2012 to 2016.

Jacqueline Moustache-Belle was born in 1961 and grew up in Mont Buxton in the Seychelles in a family of nine children.

In the 1980s, Moustache-Belle worked for Radio Seychelles and the Seychelles Broadcasting Corporation. While at the SBC, she and Ralph Lablache de Charmoy directed an environmental documentary, Men and Birds on Cousin Island (1988), about Cousin Island, the smallest island in the Seychelles and legally protected as a natural reserve. The film won third prize in a competition held by the Union of National Radio and TV Stations of Africa.

She served in a variety of executive positions at the SBC and in the Seychelles Ministry of Foreign Affairs and Planning and the Ministry of Tourism and Transport.

She served as one of four co-presidents of the United Cities and Local Governments for the 2013-2016 term and in 2021 was appointed director of the Gender and Youth Department (REFELA) of the UCLG.

In 2026 she became the Ambassador of Seychelles to China.

== Personal life ==
She is married to Eddy Belle, a petroleum engineer, and they have three children.
