= Diane Audrey Ngako =

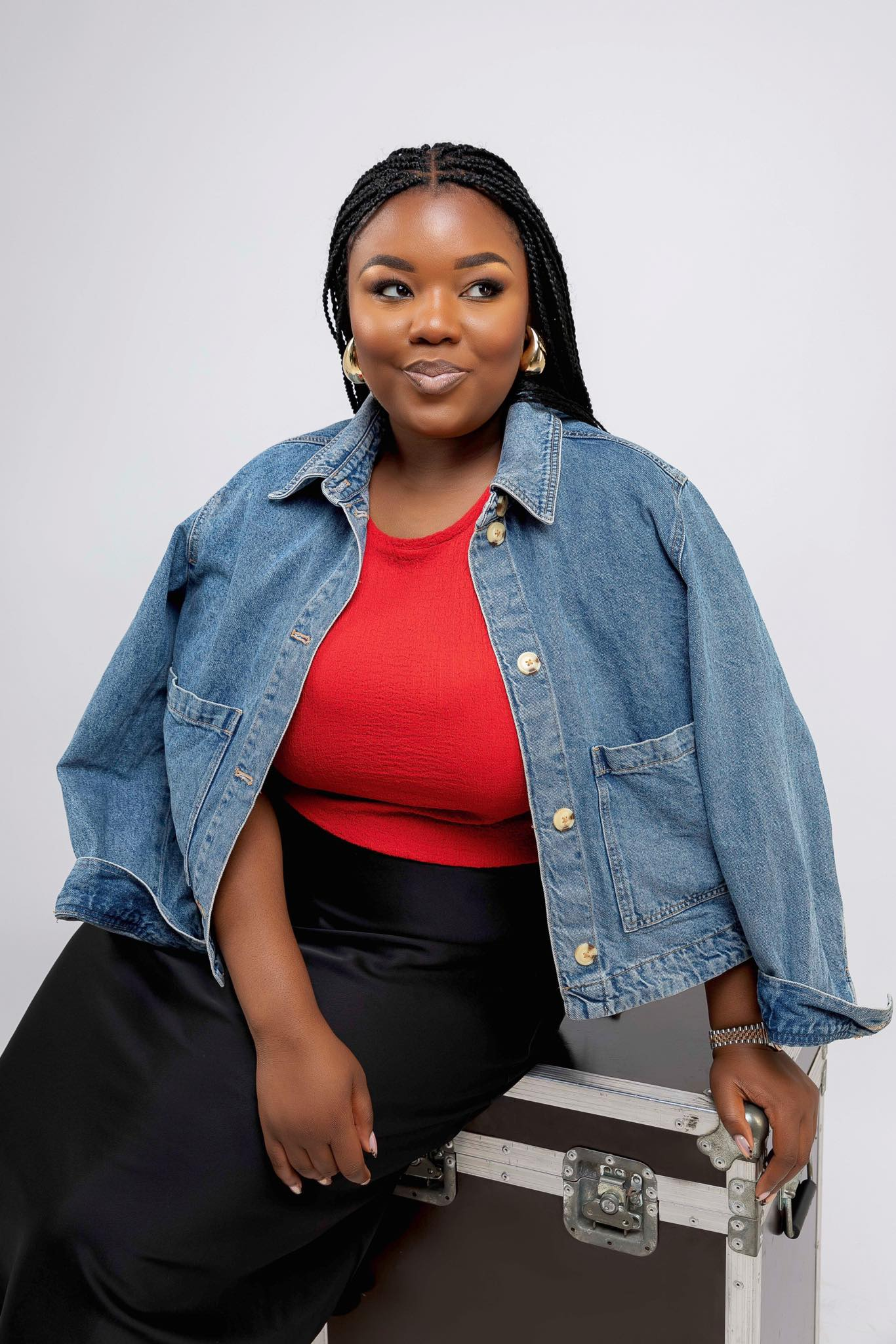
- Born: 6 September 1991 (age 34); Douala, Cameroon
- Occupation: Entrepreneur

Diane Audrey Ngako (born 6 September 1991) is a Cameroonian businesswoman. She is the president and founder of Omenkart Group, and she shares her passion for contemporary art through her publishing house, Baköu, and her podcast "Si Maman M'avait dit" (If Mom Had Told Me).

== Biography ==
=== Career ===
During her studies, Ngako began her career in 2012 at Africa Numéro 1, where she focused on culture. That same year, she became the editorial manager of Roots Magazine, a print magazine dedicated to Afro-Caribbean culture distributed in Île de France and available online. In 2014, she launched Visiter l’Afrique, a collaborative digital platform aimed at promoting African tourism, which quickly gathered a community of over 400,000 subscribers.

In 2014, Ngako joined the editorial team of Le Monde in preparation for the creation of Le Monde Afrique under the direction of Serge Michel. She mainly covered topics related to entrepreneurship, African youth, the diaspora, and new technologies. In 2015, she joined the team of the TV news program TV5 Monde as a columnist. After five years in the French media industry, Ngako decided to return to Cameroon, her home country.

In 2016, Ngako returned to Cameroon and settled in Douala. In February 2017, she founded Omenkart, a communication and marketing consulting agency based between Douala and Abidjan. In 2018, she organized the first contemporary art fair, Douala Art Fair, an event that brought together actors from the cultural and artistic world of Central Africa.

In 2019, she organized the first edition of the Douala Digital Show, a marketplace for digital companies in Cameroon. The third edition of the Douala Digital Show took place in December 2022.

In 2020, she Co-founded The Okwelians, a Think Do Tank of women and men committed to promoting, through ethical leadership, a culture of social innovation in Cameroon. That same year, she launched the podcast «Si maman m’avait dit», a series that gives voice to men and women to break taboos.

=== Distinctions ===
2016 - Forbes 30 under 30

2017 - Mandela Washington Fellow

2019 - Nouveaux Leaders Du Futur - Crans Montana Forum

2021-2022 - Young Leaders - French African Foundation

=== Associative commitments ===
Ngako is committed to the role of women in Cameroonian society. She is involved in the founding of several associations, events, or websites promoting women. She is a co-founder and communication director of The Okwelians, where she focuses on the role of women in the political arena.
