= Taotao (TV series) =

Japanese anime television series

- Tao Tao Ehonkan
- Screenshot from Taotao

タオタオ絵本館
- Genre: Adventure, edutainment
- Anime film

Shunmao Monogatari Taotao シュンマオ物語 タオタオ
- Directed by: Yoji Yamada
- Studio: Shochiku; Shun Mao Production Committee; Tianjin City Craft Art Design Institute
- Released: December 26, 1981
- Runtime: 87 minutes
- Anime television series
- Directed by: Shuichi Nakahara; Tatsuo Shimamura
- Studio: Shun Mao; Tsuchida Production
- Original network: TV Osaka
- Original run: October 7, 1983 – April 9, 1985
- Episodes: 52

Taotao (Note: Japanese: タオタオ絵本館, Hepburn: Tao Tao Ehonkan) is a Japanese animated series that aired for a total of 52 episodes on TV Osaka. The first series aired from October 7, 1983, through March 30, 1984. A second series with the same title was aired from October 9, 1984, through April 9, 1985.

Prior to the TV series, a feature-length animated film was released on December 26, 1981. It is not specified if the series was intended to be connected with the film and, if so, if the series takes place before the film or after it (e.g. in another realm). Both the film and the TV series were produced as a co-production between China, Japan and Germany, and directed by Shuichi Nakahara and Tatsuo Shimamura.

== Portuguese broadcast and releases ==
In Portugal, the series aired on RTP1 from 1987 to 1989 and again on the same channel, by then named Canal 1, from June 14 to September 13, 1990. RTP produced the Portuguese dub in-house using the German version. Cláudia Cadima translated the series and voiced Taotao, and António Montez directed the dub. Ermelinda Duarte voiced Mother Panda and sang the Portuguese theme song. The cast also included Fernanda Figueiredo as Puuh, Margarida Rosa Rodrigues as Kiki, and Leonor Poeira as Chon Chon.

Episodes with the RTP dub were later released in Portugal on VHS and DVD by distributors including Prisvideo and Planeta DeAgostini. The 1981 film, which follows Taotao's capture and life in a zoo during World War II, has no known Portuguese television broadcast.

== Plot ==
The series is about the eponymous Taotao, an anthropomorphic panda cub. In the stories, Taotao goes on adventures with his animal friends and listens to the stories of his mother.

== Music ==
The theme song of the series was composed by the Czech composer Karel Svoboda.

== International broadcast ==
Taotao has been shown in Finnish on the Yleisradio channels, where it was narrated by Inkeri Wallenius, and in Austria in German by ORF.

The series was also broadcast in Israel where it was dubbed into Hebrew. The theme song for the Hebrew dub was sung by Ilanit. In Greece, the series was broadcast in the 1980s on ERT1. In the late 1980s, it was broadcast in Afrikaans in South Africa. It was also broadcast in the early 1990s multiple times as تاو' تاو' in the Arab world.

The series was also broadcast in Albania in the late 1980s and early 1990s. Meanwhile, Albania's communist prime minister Adil Çarçani was informally referred to as Tao Tao by Albanian dissidents during the protests leading to the fall of communism in Albania.

The series has been broadcast in French Canada on Télévision de Radio-Canada, where it was dubbed into Quebec French, and in France, it aired from 1987 on FR3. The series also aired on Portuguese TV in 1987. In Serbia, the film was released on DVD in 2007 through City Records and Dexin Film. The Serbian dub was released by Studio Mirijus.

In 1992, as part of a collaboration with CFI in France, Vietnam Television broadcast the series in Vietnamese as part of their children's program Những bông hoa nhỏ.

== DVDs ==
- Taotao 1–4
  - Story about a crow who wanted to look like a woodpecker
  - Story about a rabbit who beat a lion
  - Story about a self-righteous snake
  - Story about three puffy frog sisters
- Taotao 5–8
  - Story about a crocodile king and his sick wife
  - Story about a rabbit who started a big rumour
  - Story about a white camel
  - Story about a careful bat
- Taotao 9–12
  - Story about a vain vulture
  - Story about a birds' moving day
  - Story about a small fish's adventure
  - Story about a fairies' wedding party
- Taotao 13–16
  - Story about unusual friends
  - Story about a difficult problem that troubled a mouse
  - Story about a selfish weather vane
  - Story about a discontent butterfly
- Taotao 17–21
  - Story about three little pigs
  - Story about a zebra
  - Story about a rainbow bird
  - Story about a small dog and a big bone
  - Story about a babbling turtle
- Taotao 22–26
  - Story about an ugly duckling
  - Story about an owl and the north wind
  - Story about a cat in boots
  - Story about the gift of a fish
  - Story about some missing fairies

== In popular culture ==
The Finnish band Guava published the Taotao theme song as a single in 2003.
