= Georges Adda =

Tunisian politician and trade unionist

- Born: September 16, 1916; Tunis
- Died: September 28, 2008 (aged 92); Tunis
- Occupation: Union activist
- Known for: Tunisian General Labour Union; L'Avenir de la Tunisie
- Spouse: Gladys Adda
- Children: Serge Adda and Leila Adda

Georges Adda (Arabic: جورج عدة; September 22, 1916 in Tunis – September 28, 2008 in Tunis) was a Tunisian politician and trade unionist, and a former leader of the Tunisian Communist Party.

== Biography ==
Adda was a respected figure of the Tunisian left opposition. He described himself as an Anti-Zionist Tunisian Jew. He strongly supported the liberation of Palestine, often proclaiming his support for the rights of "the martyr[ed] population in Palestine". He fought "for freedom, democracy and human rights", and "for defence of just causes in Tunisia and the world". He was also active in the fight for workers' rights in the Tunisian General Labour Union.

Adda became a member of the Tunisian Communist Party (PCT) in 1934. He belonged to the group which continued struggle clandestinely after the arrest of the Neo-Destour and Communist leaders in September 1934. He was imprisoned by the French colonial authorities from September 1935 to April 1936. Once out of jail, he was nominated on June 1, 1936 at the National Conference of the party as Vice Secretary-General, and acting chief of the Communist Youth wing.

In April 1940, Adda was placed under house arrest at Zaghouan, and then at Béja, where he stayed until November 13, 1943. He then fled to neighbouring Algeria.

Around 1944, he met Gladys, who was also an active member of the communist party. She was also a strong believer in social justice. He became her second husband. The couple had twins.

Adda was arrested again in 1952 by the French colonial authorities, and with other Destour and Communist leaders was sent to internal exile in Southern Tunisia. He was not freed until 1955. He later wrote about this period:

For the liberation of my country, I experienced prisons, concentration camps and deportations by the French colonialists.

Adda was a member of the PCT executive until 1957. For many years he remained an important leading member of the party and the managing editor of its French-speaking weekly, L'Avenir de la Tunisie ("Tunisia's Future"). After independence, he continued to play a role as an activist, but without an official post inside the party. His presence was still felt through his opinions, press articles and participation in democratic and trade-unionist movements.

His son, Serge Adda, the former president of TV5Monde, predeceased him in 2004 of cancer.

Adda died of a heart attack, and was buried at the Borgel Jewish Cemetery where his wife Gladys and his son were already interred.
