= CFI TV =

French-based pan-African television network

CFI TV was a French-based pan-African television network catering largely to the Françafrique region. It existed from 5 July 1999 to 31 December 2003 and was operated by the French media cooperation agency CFI. The network was available terrestrially in most of the countries where it operated.

After a shortage of funds, CFI TV shut down and was replaced by TV5 Afrique on its terrestrial network.

== History ==
CFI announced in May 1999 that it would launch a network for Africa; broadcasts began on 5 July of that year. By November, CFI was favourable in launching its channel on DStv, in opposition to ATV, as the second French channel on the package.

In 2000, the channel started airing the Burkinabé comedy The Bobodioufs. On 7 April, Le SAT (Satellite Afrique Télévision) was sold to CFI TV.

In June 2002, the channel started carrying 12 Minutes Afrique, which CFI produced and TV5 also aired. Under this arrangement, the editions were uploaded on TV5's website at 9pm UTC every evening, after the airing on CFI TV (8:45pm UTC).

It was one of the eighteen television stations available on terrestrial television in Kinshasa. It and TV5, also available over-the-air, mainly attracted an upper-class audience (executives, workers, students).

=== Closure ===
Rumours began circulating in October 2003 that the channel was set to close by the end of the year, however CFI did not have official information on the subject. France Télévisions, CFI's primary shareholder, had nothing to say. The audience base in Françafrique was already preparing for the closure, condemning its shutdown as the channel gave more visibility for African projects. It was later revealed that CFI was working for a French counterweight to English-language world news channels, CFI 24, a concept which would later become France 24. From 2004, CFI would continue distributing programmes free of charge to African broadcasters. Finally, on 31 December 2003, CFI TV shut down for good. TV5 Afrique became responsible for managing its terrestrial footprint and some of its content, such as Club de la presse.
