= Radyo Sesel =

Radio station of the Seychelles Broadcasting Corporation

Radio Sesel (Radio Seychelles) is the main radio station of the Seychelles Broadcasting Corporation. It started broadcasting in 1965 and is a generalist service, in English, French and Creole. The station broadcasts on FM, online and on digital terrestrial; up until 2024, it was also available on AM.

== History ==
Radyo Sesel started broadcasts on 20 July 1965, up until then Seychelles only depended on a station owned by the Department of Education that existed since 1945. At launch, it provided four and a half hours of programming in English, French and Creole. Its first outside broadcast was in September 1966, covering the National Show.

On 30 May 1971, an explosion occurred at its studios in Union Vale, caused by a demolition charge, which totally destroyed the transmitters. The first outdoor vehicle came one year after independence, in 1977, during which time it provided a 65-hour weekly schedule.

To combat loss of reception on AM radio, Radyo Sesel started broadcasting on the packages of Intelvision and Cable & Wireless Seychelles in August 2021. The service was available free of charge to terrestrial television users since 2017-2018, when the digital network switched on.

A feasibility study for the migration of Radyo Sesel from AM broadcasts was ordered in 2020. FM simulcasts of the station began in 2022 and AM broadcasts ended on 8 March 2024 at 3pm. The station broadcasts exclusively from its four-transmitter network since then.
