= TVMonaco =

State-owned television channel in Monaco

- Country: Monaco
- Broadcast area: Worldwide

Programming
- Language: French

Ownership
- Owner: Government of Monaco
- Key people: Salim Zeghdar (CEO/Executive director); Nathalie Biancolli (deputy CEO)

History
- Launched: 1 September 2023; 3 years ago

Links
- Website: videos.tvmonaco.com

Availability

Terrestrial
- TNT (France): Channel 35 (Eastern Provence-Alpes-Côte d'Azur incl. Monaco)

TVMonaco (TVM/TVMO (Note: Usually referred to as "TVM", however goes by "TVMO" within the EBU to avoid confusion with Television Malta.)) is the state-owned television station in Monaco, that launched on 1 September 2023. It broadcasts a range of programmes, including news, talk shows, and documentaries, designed to showcase and promote Monégasque culture.

== History ==
The idea of a national Monégasque public channel emerged in the principality in 2021, with the aim of recovering Monaco's international communications, after RMC moved to Paris in 2002 and the 100% acquisition of TMC by the TF1 Group in June 2016.

Initially named Monte-Carlo Riviera TV, it was originally planned to launch in late 2022, however, it was delayed to the third quarter of 2023. On 23 March 2023, a new name and launch date were announced for the channel. The channel was renamed TVMonaco and officially launched on 1 September 2023. In December 2021, MCR/TVMonaco joined TV5Monde. The name TVMonaco was announced in March 2023.

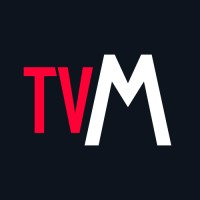
Alternate version of the TVMonaco logo, seen on social media platforms

New details about the service were announced on 18 April 2023. The programming would consist of live news and sports with recorded programming for the rest of the day. Said content currently consists of unscripted programming, but there are plans to add scripted programming within 12 to 18 months from launch. Emphasis is also given to environmental concerns and wildlife in Monaco. The channel is available in both linear and digital platforms.

TVMonaco, which is funded in part by the state, in part through advertising and sales of the programs it produces, will become a member of TV5Monde, allowing its content to be broadcast in 200 countries. The channel produces 52 annual programmes for the network.

The channel announced on social media on 17 August 2023 that the first broadcast would be on 1 September 2023 at 19:15. The opening broadcast saw the presence of Prince Albert II and Princess Charlene. Each public television company part of TV5Monde, as well as France 24, helped build the channel:

- technical support was given from RTBF;
- governance was built with RTS;
- while Radio-Canada and TV5Monde provided support regarding its content.

Shortly after the channel's launch, TVMonaco became a member of Monaco Media Diffusion, the broadcasting company which represents Monaco in the European Broadcasting Union (EBU). In March 2024, TVMonaco joined the EBU independently, allowing it to access EBU events on its own, which includes the possibility of Monaco returning to the Eurovision Song Contest.

=== Proposed merger with Monaco Info ===
In December 2024, the Government of Monaco announced a merger of TVMonaco and fellow Monaco-based channel Monaco Info, which at the time was scheduled for September 2025. This currently includes the possibility of the successive broadcaster retaining its membership as the only Monégasque member of TV5Monde, after it was previously proposed by the former Minister of State, Didier Guillaume that the new broadcaster would not retain TVMonaco's share of ownership of the network, before his passing in January 2025.

In October 2025, French newspaper Nice-Matin reported that the merger had been pushed ahead to 2026 at the earliest. This followed an audit presented to the National Council of Monaco on 7 October 2025 by the current Minister of State, Christophe Mirmand, where he stated that he aimed to reduce costs by merging the two broadcasters together and confirming that changes can be expected to begin sometime in 2026. An announcement was due to be made by the Monégasque government in January 2026, however no further updates have yet been released as of October 2026.

== Finances ==
The network cost €13.5 million to launch, while its annual budget ascends to €15 million.

== Infrastructure ==
The channel is located in the Le Triton building in Fontvieille and employs 48 employees, 30 of them being journalists.

It received the support of Jacques Legros and Thibault Malandrin for its implementation.

The channel has four key pillars: environment, current affairs, sport and lifestyle, and has as its slogan Regardez, ça n'a rien à voir ("Watch, it has nothing to do", similar to an old France Inter slogan).

The channel wants to rely on the TV5 and France 24 networks. Starting with mainly purchased programs, the goal is to have more and more of its own content with its own identity.

== Directive ==
- Nathalie Biancolli, Director-General
- Salim Seghdar, Director-General until the launch of the channel
- Marie-Pierre Gramaglia, president of the board of directors
- Sylvain Bottari, director of technology and antenna
- Sofian Biouti, director of communications, marketing and digital
- Nadia Morin, director of on-air rights and sales
- Pierre Classen, sports director
- Frédéric Cauderlier, editor-in-chief

== Programming ==
=== Weekly programmes ===
- Ça va l'faire!, weekdays at 6pm since 8 September 2025; previously aired mornings at 8am from launch.
- L'actu, nightly at 7pm since 8 September 2025, also usually airing on TV5Monde; previously aired at 7:15pm from launch.
- Ça matche, dedicated to sports, weekends at 6pm since 8 September 2025; previously aired at 6:15pm from launch.
- La mouétéo, daily weather reports, the programme is presented by a virtual seagull called Monacoco, with a voice-over for the mascot. The name is a portmanteau of the French words, "météo" (weather) and "mouette" (seagull).
- Le match dans le match, every weekend at 8:10pm.

For the weather, the satellite images are provided by France 24. The weather system works using Automate-IT; the inclusion of a world weather segment was due to the fact that people from 140 nationalities live in Monaco. Separate versions with regional (Riviera) and local (Monaco) weather are also produced, as well as a reformatted version for Instagram.

=== Other regular programming ===
- L'actu talk, airs following the news at 7:30pm.
- L’œil du raddar, debate show about various topics, relating to Monaco and the world.
- Roca Sphere, airs the AS Monaco Basket men's basketball team's matches in the EuroLeague as of the 2025–26 season.
- L'après-match, post-match discussions that airs following AS Monaco's basketball matches.
- Monaco Effect, interviews with celebrities and other notable people describing their experiences in their respective fields, and their connection to Monaco.

Programmes on its streaming service that are imported from non-Francophone countries, for instance Sophie Grigson: Slice of Italy, are subtitled to French and are not dubbed.

=== TVMonaco Originals ===
The following is a list of TVMonaco Originals programmes created by the broadcaster that are currently available to stream, including TV shows, news, sports, documentaries, podcasts, concerts and entertainment programming, as of November 2025:

- Le Club francophone (2025)
- L'odyssée salée: des forêts aux récifs (2025)
- L'odyssée salée: Les acteurs du changement (2025)
- L'odyssée salée: Le fjord retient son souffle (2024)
- 4 History (2025)
- On the roc, Monaco fait son cinéma (2025)
- Blackwater (2024)
- Dolce vita riviera (2023-2024)
- Les nids d'aigles de la riviera (2023)
- Les pépites rocher (2024)
- 100% pur poils (2024)
- Du double au simple (2024)
- Riviera Food Tour (2023)
- Les voix du silence (2024)
- Signes du temps a capella - Concert de musique spirituelle à la Cathédrale de Monaco (2024)
- 100 ans en rouge et blanc (2024)
- La méditerranée n'est pas morte (2024)
- Antibes cap sur l'azur
- Le dernier dauphin de la rivière sacrée (2023)
- Monaco Cycling Club (2024)
- Top marques, a Monaco supercar heritage (2024)
- Entrée en jeux
- Sunriders (2023)
- Le pivaud de la jeunesse
- Sept de cœur (2023)
- La dure loi des séries (2024)
- Générations laudato si' (2023-2024)
- Les enfants de la balle
- Les invisibles

== Availability ==
In Monaco, the channel is accessible on the universal service (cable network), channel 1 and via Monaco Telecom (MTTV/LaBox), channel 9.

It is also present on digital terrestrial television alongside Monaco Info (which is separately operated but is also owned by the Government of Monaco), from the Mont Agel, France transmitter (UHF channel 35), and visible in the Alpes-Maritimes and the East Var from Menton to Bormes-les-Mimosas.

In France via the boxes of the country's internet operators such as myCanal, Freebox, Orange, SFR and Molotov.

In French-speaking countries (Switzerland, Belgium, etc.) via myCanal and on Canalsat (channel 125).

By satellite in Europe via Astra 1M (19.2 E) and in the Middle East and North Africa from MonacoSat-1 (52.0 E) with the hypothesis of launching to the United States and in Asia, as well as Africa.

On the internet, the channel's live stream is available on its official website.

== Controversies ==
The channel was criticized by the General Confederation of Media executives which warns against a "prince's channel" which would be the "fact of the prince" (Albert II), the heterogeneous composition of the editorial staff raising doubts about its independence and credibility.

On March 26, 2025, TVMonaco EuroLeague commentator and Nice native Laurent Sciarra was suspended from the channel after declaring his support for the OGC Nice association football team during a EuroLeague broadcast, including using OGC Nice's supporter chant "Issa Nissa" (Occitan for "Go, Nice"), ahead of a then-upcoming derby match between OGC Nice and Monaco's AS Monaco FC. TVMonaco's management claimed the statement constituted "unacceptable and inappropriate remarks".
