= French Media Development Agency =

The French Media Development Agency (French: Agence française de développement médias), better known as CFI (derived from the initials of Canal France International, its former name), is a French media cooperation agency established in 1989.

Its primary mission is to assist development of the media sector in sub-Saharan Africa, the Mediterranean, the Caucasus, the Balkans and Southeast Asia.

Initially devised in the late 80s as a repository of French television programmes sent to broadcasters around the world, especially in Africa. In the 2000s, when TV5Monde and France 24 became the key Francophone players in the international market, CFI evolved by becoming a media exchange and cooperation organisation.

== History ==
=== Programme service and television channel ===
On 21 March 1988, prime minister Jacques Chirac announced the creation of Canal France, a satellite-fed television system for Africa, which consisted of a selection of programmes and video material brought in from TF1, Antenne 2, FR3, Canal+ and RFO. The new service was delivered using the Intelsat V satellite, which CFI had booked since the second half of the previous year; broadcasts began on 1 April 1988. Canal France replaced France's existing system which implied the sending of 5,000 hours worth of videotaped material every year to Africa. The new system was faster than the existing one. Unlike other satellite channels, it ruled out reception by home dishes, as the bespoke channel served as a feed of programming intended for broadcasters to air either live or on tape delay. The pilot service had an eight-hour schedule at launch.

After the change in the majority of the French government in 1988, the new prime minister Michel Rocard orders a report on the French audiovisual policy to Alain Decaux, a report which led to the superseding of the pilot Canal France project by Canal France International (CFI) in 1989. Radio France's former director-general Fouad Benhalla was in charge of the new company.

The full launch of the satellite channel did not take place until 17 April 1989. It was conceived as a "programme bank" consisting of productions from Antenne 2, FR3, RFO and TF1's news bulletin on satellite, which were also offered to television stations around the world.

Canal France International, originally fully financed by the state agency Sofirad, was created as a programme bank for international markets, largely in Africa. In three years, its spread quadrupled, reaching 170 million viewers and no less than seventy broadcasters in its target countries and regions. From 1996, CFI adopted a regionalisation policy for its contents, especially those targeting Africa, and multiplied the broadcast of large sporting events (CAN, Summer Olympics, FIFA World Cup, UEFA Champions League).

In 1995, Sofirad handed over 22% of its control in TV5 Monde to CFI in order to unify the technical units of the two companies. CFI thus became Sofirad's only television operator. From 1999 to 2003, a free-to-air television channel, CFI TV, was produced to cater to Francophone Africa, before giving way for TV5 Afrique. In 2000, CFI acquired Portinvest, owner of the Francophone satellite package Le Sat (Satellite Afrique Télévision), from Sofirad.

In the context of the French state's plan to create its own counterweight to CNN, Sofirad sold CFI to a condominium between France Télévisions (75%) and Arte France (25%) in July 2003. In 2015, CFI definitively ceased its distribution of television programmes to Africa.

=== Media cooperation ===
Since 2009, CFI concentrates its activities on the transfer of media expertise with developing countries where the organism desires to reinforce the state of law and promoting freedom of expression.

Following the Arab Springs of 2011, CFI launched 4M (Le quatrième média) to form new information actors in media innovation. In 2013, CFI and Forever Group signed a partnership agreement to create Myanmar's first news channel. In 2014, with European financing, CFI opens a "media incubator" in Gaziantep (Turkey) to assist and follow Syrian media in producing and airing reliable and balanced information. In 2016, CFI and Code for Africa held the Afrique Innovation concert with US$1 million in prizes, shared between twenty selected partners.

In June 2017, CFI became a wholly-owned subsidiary of France Médias Monde, reinforcing its cooperation with the France Médias Monde France24-RFI-MCD academy to enlarge its offer. In late 2019, Beninese journalist Ignace Sossou was condemned to 18 months in prison confinement for sharing, on his social media profiles, declarations made by promotor Mario Metonou after a conference held by CFI, such declarations were "truncated and removed from context" according to CFI who demanded Sossou to be freed "as soon as possible". Following the 2020 Beirut explosion, CFI unblocked a €100,000 aid package for impacted journalists.

In April 2021, CFI, RFI, France 24 and Monte Carlo Doualiya launched the Conseils de journalistes (Advice from Journalists) website, which offers free educational content to journalists, bloogers and students in Africa, Middle East and Southeast Asia. In 2023, CFI relaunches its annual forum L'atelier des médias after four years of absence.

== Activities ==
CFI supplies development aid in the media sector in sub-Saharan Africa, the Mediterranean, the Caucasus and Balkans and Southeast Asia. Its activities are structured around three axes: Media and Governance (legislation, pluralism, ethics), Media and Companies (financing of media companies), Media and Development (information and innovation).

In 2022, CFI had over thirty projects, its main ones being:

- MédiaSahel: Inclusion via media of the youth in the democratic life in the Sahel region;
- Aswatana: Developing media in the transition to democracy in Sudan;
- Afri'Kibaaru: Reinforcing editorial and managerial competences in six Great Sahel countries facing durable development;
- Connexions citoyennes: Encouraging the emergence of citizen initiatives in Francophone Africa;
- Terra Africa: Follows journalists aiming to concentrate on integrated analysis of environmental questions. This project is supported by the production of content which put into value the search for solutions, all of that while stimulating political and citizen engagement, namely through the creation of short videos inserted in the context of the EPOP Network.

CFI operates under the auspices of the Ministry for Europe and Foreign Affairs. Since 2017, CFI is a wholly-owned subsidiary of France Médias Monde. CFI is also a member of the Global Forum for Media Development (GFMD).

== Presidents ==
- 1989–1994: Fouad Benhalla
- 1994–1998: Philippe Baudillon
- 1998–2001: Jean Stock
- 2001–2004: Serge Adda
- 2004–2006: Jean-Jacques Aillagon
- 2008–2017: Alain Belais
- 2017–2018: Jean-Emmanuel Casalta
- 2018–2020: Marc Fonbaustier
- 2020–2025: Thierry Vallat
- Since 2 September 2025: Emmanuelle Talon
