= SBC 1 =

- Country: Seychelles
- Broadcast area: Seychelles
- Headquarters: Victoria, Seychelles

Programming
- Languages: Seychellois Creole; English; French
- Picture format: 1080i HDTV

Ownership
- Owner: Seychelles Broadcasting Corporation
- Sister channels: SBC 2 SBC 3

History
- Launched: 31 December 1982; 43 years ago
- Former names: RTS (1982–1992); SBC (1992–2018)

Links
- Website: www.sbc.sc

Availability

Terrestrial
- SBC's DTT platform: Channel 1

SBC 1 is a Seychellois free-to-air television channel, flagship of the Seychelles Broadcasting Corporation. It started broadcasting on 31 December 1982 as RTS and was the only terrestrial television channel for nearly 35 years, when the arrival of digital terrestrial television enabled SBC to open two more channels. The channel broadcasts in the three official languages, English, French and Creole; the main news (at 12:30pm and 8pm) is broadcast in the latter (SBC Nouvel); as well as having updates in French at 6pm (SBC Infos) and English at 7pm (SBC News).

== History ==
=== RTS ===
The legal precedent for the introduction of television in the country was the creation of a television unit at Bel Eau in 1980, producing programmes for the Ministry of Education, as well as the Department and Information and the one-party ruling People's Progressive Front. Around this time, the government announced that it would start full television broadcasts in January 1983. A broadcasting station was to be set up at Hermitage (later Mont Fleuri) and its main transmitter was installed at St. Louis Hill with assistance from Cable & Wireless. In this phase, it would only cover north-eastern Mahé, including the capital, and parts of Praslin. This was to be followed by four relay transmitters at Le Niol, Anse Boileau, St. Anne Island and Baie Lazare to be installed during 1983, which would enable islandwide coverage in Mahé. Equipment donations were received from Japan. During 1982, staff was trained overseas and its studios were being built in a former school, with its first studio in its dining room. During the pilot stage, RTS acquired an outside broadcast van and an electronic news gathering chain with Japanese assistance.

On 31 December 1982, Radio Television Seychelles started broadcasting its television station, broadcasting three hours a day Fridays to Saturdays, in the PAL format. In the initial phase, 40% of the population received its services, on the east coast of Mahé and in western Praslin and La Digue. RTS was also tasked to install television sets into Seychellois households at reasonable prices, as well as in community centres to reach out to the largest number of Seychellois. Expansion work took place throughout the year; on 27 August 1983, RTS technicians installed a television set, antenna and VCR at the La Passe School in Silhouette Island, expanding its coverage. During this phase, RTS gradually expanded its airtime from the initial three hours; within a couple of years, broadcasts opened at 5 or 6pm and ended at 10:30pm. The French news bulletin aired at 6pm, while the English bulletin aired at 8:30pm.

In 1986, TV was already accessible to approximately 98% of the population, having now achieved almost complete coverage. In 1989 RTS Television began broadcasting 7 days a week, but only on evenings. Thanks to the installation of a satellite dish at the Hermitage complex in 1991, Seychellois viewers could watch CNN, which was relayed by RTS. In late March 1992, members of newly-legalised political parties reached an agreement with RTS to provide media coverage on their actions.

=== SBC ===
On 1 May 1992, following the reintroduction of the multi-party political system, RTS, previously a government broadcaster under the direct control of the Ministry of Information, became the Seychelles Broadcasting Corporation (SBC), an independent public broadcasting service.

The TV weather segments produced by the National Meteorological Services were overhauled in August 2005, following a training programme initiated by the UK Met Office.

For years, SBC received television broadcasts of the UEFA Champions League. Beginning in the 2006-2007 season, the group who acquired the rights to CFI excluded the Seychelles from the Francophone African market, causing SBC to begin a new round of negotiations.

In May 2008, SBC unveiled a new logo and a new channel identity. To this end, SBC dispatched two CFI graphic designers, Renaud Lefebvre and Guillaume Ollier. On 18 June 2008, SBC started airing two daily blocks of France 24 simulcasts, at 8-9am (every day) and 3-4pm (working weekdays only). In 2009, it started airing En Momen Avek Preziden (Meeting the President).

In March 2010, SBC renewed its television programming, placing greater attention on the production of local programs. Seasonal programs were introduced and the schedule was extended to 24 hours thanks to the advent of an automatic broadcasting system. Coinciding with this came the launch of a breakfast programme, Bonzour Sesel (Good Morning Seychelles), airing from 6 to 8am.

In November 2011, SBC expanded the airtime of CCTV-News from four hours to six, with the aim of delivering a 24-hour relay upon digitalization. It was expected that SBC would switch on its digital terrestrial network by the end of 2012, with capacity for twelve channels.

On 9 September 2012, SBC revamped its graphics and expanded the airtime of the 6pm French and 7pm English bulletins to make them more comprehensive. Local programming was increased, as well as the creation of a television operating base in Praslin.

=== SBC 1 ===
The channel was on track to be renamed SBC 1 in late 2017 with the soft launch of digital terrestrial television and SBC 2 started its test broadcasts. The rename was made effective on 28 June 2018, coinciding with its major rebrand. On 31 July 2020, SBC 1's analog signal shut down.
