= TéléSesel =

- Country: Seychelles
- Broadcast area: Seychelles
- Headquarters: Victoria, Seychelles

Programming
- Languages: Seychellois Creole; English; French
- Picture format: 1080i HDTV

Ownership
- Owner: Radius Studios

History
- Launched: 24 July 2017; 9 years ago

TéléSesel (styled in lowercase as telesesel) is a Seychellois cable television channel, owned by Radius Studios and available exclusively over Cable & Wireless Seychelles' network. The channel provides more local content than SBC's own channels.

== History ==
TéléSesel was created by Clave Camille and Gilmer Philoe, upon the former's establishment of Radius Studios, in 2015, and opened on 24 July 2017 as the first local high-definition channel in the country, on channel 1 of Cable & Wireless. Philoe supported the idea of more local television channels for Seychellois viewers. The goal was to complement, and not compete with, SBC and other services available. Its launch led to increased demand from local production companies.

In January 2018, it aired the eighth Cable Tunes award, the first time it aired on television.

The channel held a celebratory roadshow on 24 July 2022, marking its five-year anniversary.
