= Gladys Adda =

Tunisian communist and activist (1921–1995)

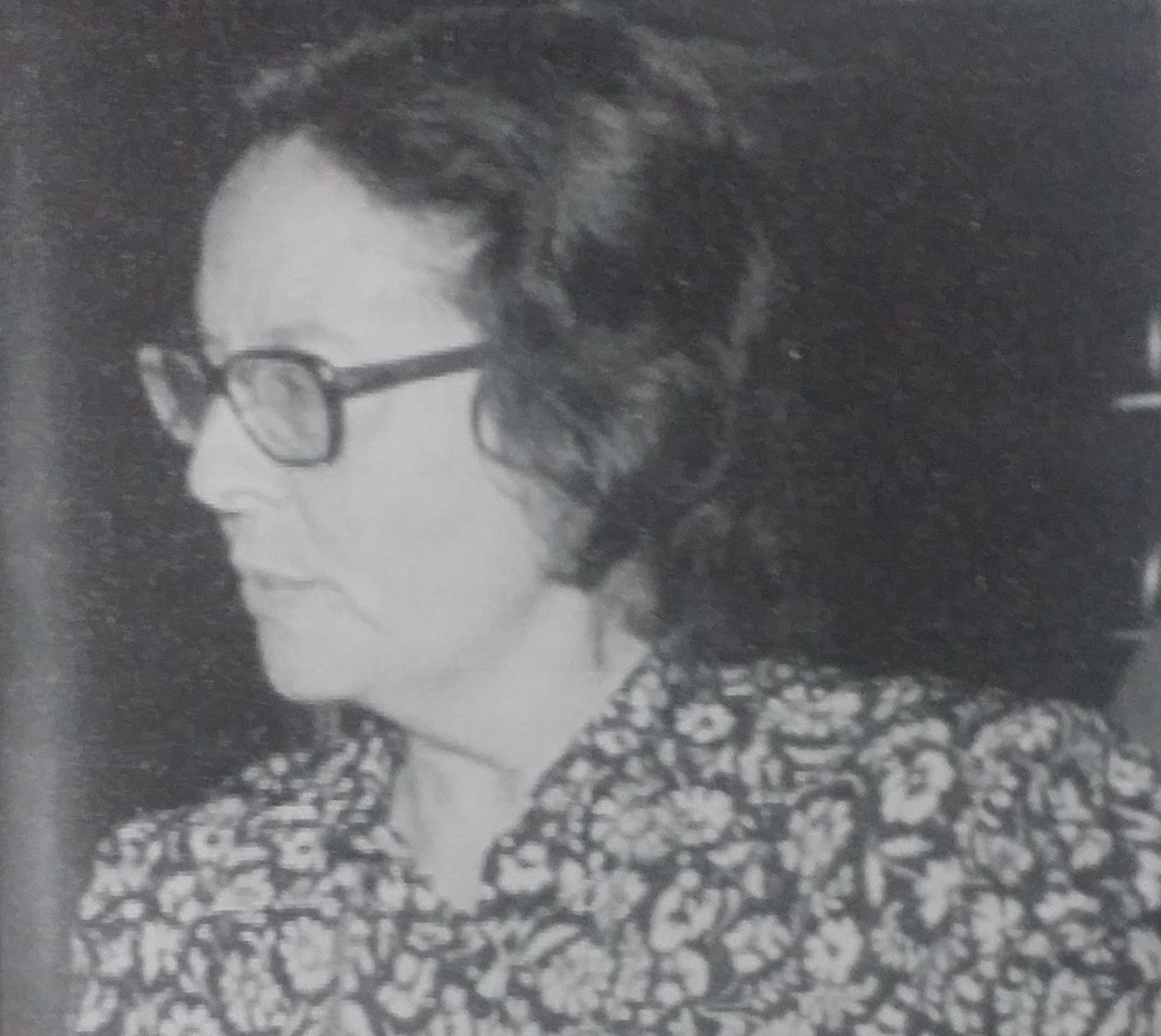
- Born: Gladys Scialom; June 2, 1921; Gabès
- Died: 1995 (aged 73–74); Tunis
- Political party: Communist
- Spouse: Georges Adda
- Children: Norbert Saâda, Serge Adda and Leila Adda

Gladys Adda (née Scialom; 1921 - 1995) was a Tunisian communist and activist for independence and women's rights.

== Life ==
Adda was born in Gabès on 2 June 1921 into a Jewish family. Unusually she was educated first with girls and then coeducationally. Despite attending primary school classes with a mix of Muslim, Jewish, and European girls, all of her teachers were French or European; the experience of undisguised racism from European teachers awakened Adda's awareness of European colonialism. Her Jewish community suffered some racism from antisemitic fascists, but the community was protected by the Muslim majority. Aged fifteen she was married to a man seven years her senior and she remained married to him for seven years until she divorced him, together, they had one son, Norbert Saâda. At the time Tunisia was part of the French Empire except during the Second World War when it was occupied by Nazi Germany. Adda engaged in political activism by covertly distributing anti-Nazi and anti-colonial leaflets against the German occupying forces in Vichy Tunisia.

In 1944 she met and married her second husband, Georges Adda, and they had twins. Their son Serge Adda became a successful French businessperson. The same year she, Neila Haddad and Gilda khiari were co-founders of the Union of the Women of Tunisia (UFT). This was an organisation associated with the local communist party and it was led by Nabiha Ben Miled who was a Muslim. She became involved with organising free clinics for women and alternative schooling for children and adults. At the time access to education at colonial schools was being denied as a result of the demands for Tunisian independence. The Addas were seen as a risk and Georges was imprisoned in the 1950s.

She and the UFT were involved in petitioning the French authorities on behalf of condemned Tunisian prisoners. Tunisia achieved independence in 1956 and unlike many she and her husband decided to stay in Tunisia, She and the UFT did not disband and they extended their support to activists in Algeria who were still trying to achieve independence from France. Adda and her husband became involved in the early distribution of Tunisian newspapers and as a result she gave lectures in Tunis.

She died in 1995; her widower Georges died in 2008.
