= Anne Lafortune =

Seychellois teacher and diplomat

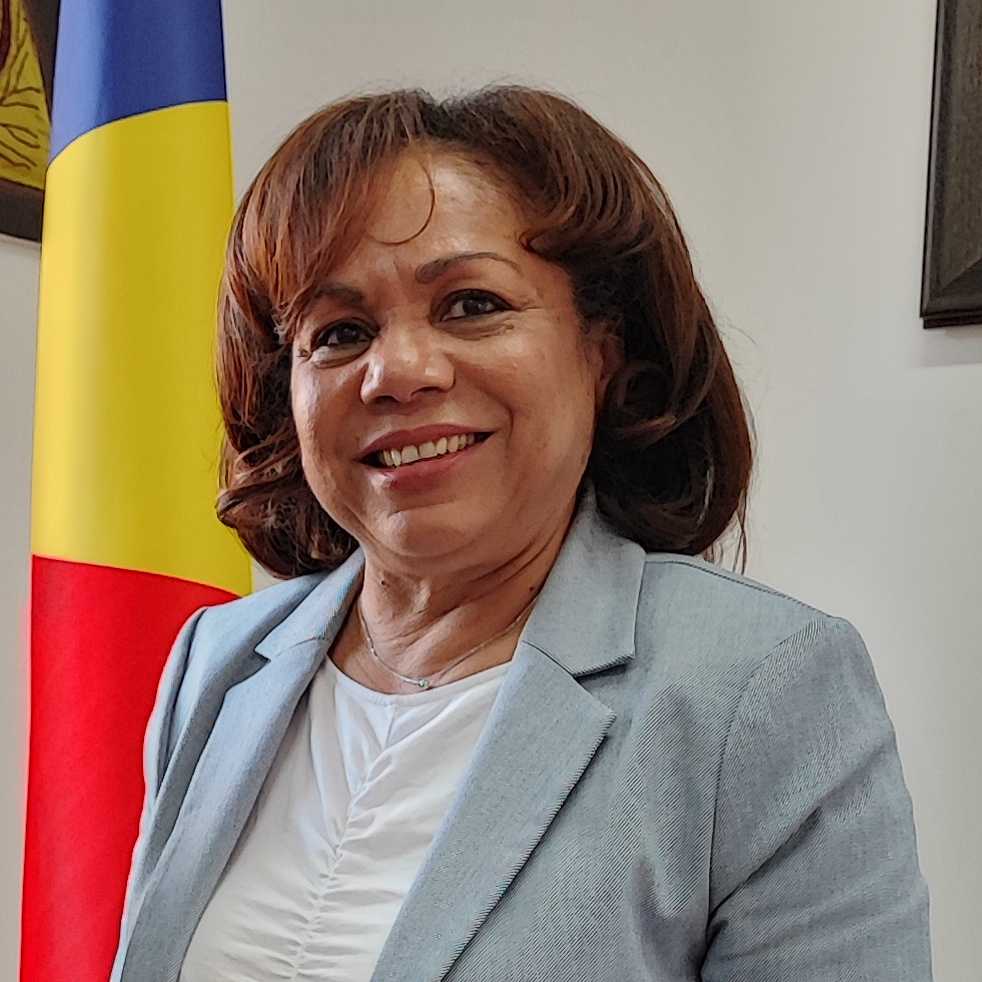
- Anne Lafortune, Ambassador for the Seychelles
- Born: Sabah
- Education: University of Bristol
- Occupation: diplomat
- Known for: ambassador to China, Japan and Korea for the Seychelles
- Children: two

Anne Lafortune is a Seychellois teacher turned diplomat. In 2023 she became her country's ambassador to China, Japan and South Korea.

== Life ==
Lafortune was born in Sabah in Malaysia as her family were living and working there.

She went into teaching and she became the Seychelles Polytechnic's director before she was employed by the Ministry of Education as their Director General for Technical and Further Education. In 2007 she moved out of education to be the Principal Secretary for Health and Social Development.

Lafortune became the Principal Secretary for Tourism in 2013 in the Ministry of Foreign Affairs and Tourism. In 2015 she received a World Travel Award on behalf of the Seychelles when it was recognised as the Indian Ocean's leading destination. She arranged for the training of tourism staff in Ireland. Her own education took place at Western Australia's Edith Cowan University and Bristol University in England.

She became an ambassador for the Seychelles in 2021. This is an honour that gives her the title of "Ambassador" for her life. There have been less than thirty ambassadors ever when she was selected. In 2023 she was accredited as the ambassador to China in the Great Hall of the People alongside 69 other ambassadors. She was also the ambassador to Japan and South Korea.

Lafortune sits on a number of boards in the Seychelles. These include the board for the Civil Aviation Authority, the Seychelles Investment Board, the country's Broadcasting Corporation and the Seychelles Licensing Authority.

== Private life ==
Lafortune has two children and a home on Mahe which is the main island of the Seychelles.
