= China–Seychelles relations =

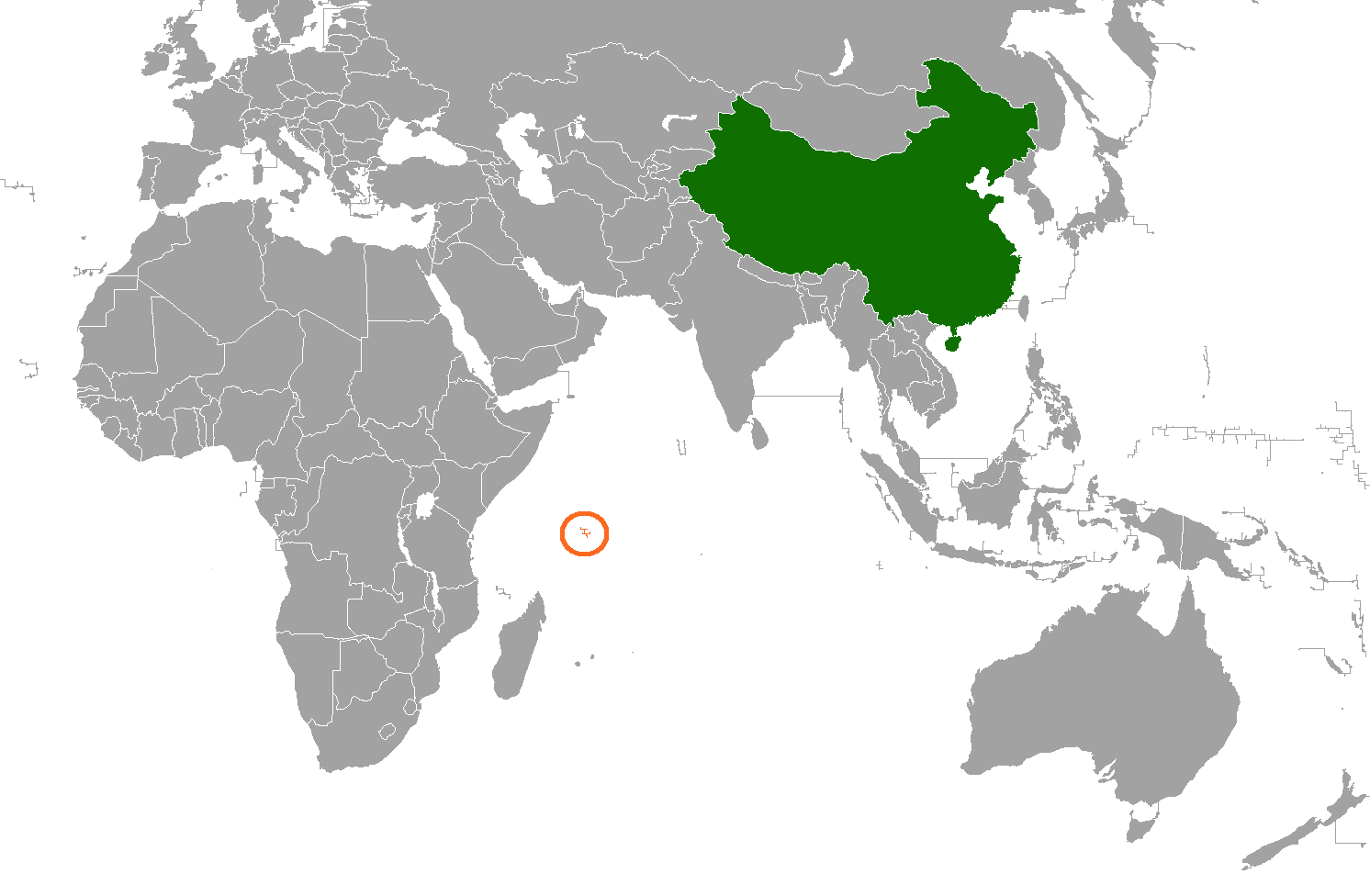

- China: Seychelles

China–Seychelles relations refer to bilateral relations between China and Seychelles. China has an embassy in Victoria and Seychelles has an embassy in Beijing and a consulate in Shanghai.

== Political ties ==
Diplomatic relations were established on June 30, 1976. China began providing Seychelles with diplomatic aide in 1977, including things such as constructing a poly-technical school and developing housing project in Les Mamelles. In 2002, China exported US$1.48 million worth of goods, while importing only $100,000 from Seychelles. The current Chinese ambassador to Seychelles is Wang Weiguo, who heads the embassy in Saint Louis, on the island of Mahe.

In 2011, the Seychelles government offered to China the possibility of establishing a port in Seychelles to supply ships fighting piracy off the coast of Somalia.

In its foreign relations, Seychelles maximizes the benefits it receives from both China and India by taking advantage of those two countries' rivalry with respect to the strategic waterway in which Seychelles exists.

== Economic relations ==
From 2000 to 2011, there are approximately 16 Chinese official development finance projects identified in Seychelles through various media reports. These projects range from a concessional loan of 300 million RMB in 2007, to a 321 million debt rescheduling in 2011, and a development aid grant worth US$8 million in 2011.

Seychelles joined the Belt and Road Initiative (BRI) in 2018.

== Media cooperation ==
In 2024, China provided technical equipment to Seychelles for the construction of its new headquarters for the Seychelles Broadcasting Corporation. The headquarters' construction was also supported by a grant from China.

== Sovereignty issues ==
Seychelles follows the one China principle. It recognizes the People's Republic of China as the sole government of China and Taiwan as an integral part of China's territory, and supports all efforts by the PRC to "achieve national reunification". It also considers Hong Kong, Xinjiang and Tibet to be China's internal affairs.
