= TV5 Monde Style =

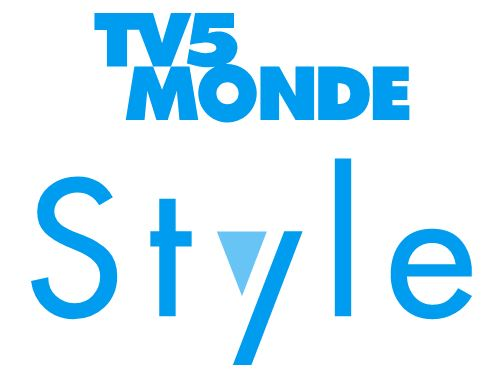
- Broadcast area: Asia-Pacific, Middle East, Europe, South Asia, Americas, Africa
- Network: TV5Monde
- Headquarters: Paris, France

Programming
- Language: French
- Picture format: 1080i (HDTV)

Ownership
- Owner: TV5MONDE, S.A.
- Sister channels: TV5Monde; TiVi5 Monde; TV5 Québec Canada; Unis

History
- Launched: 8 April 2015; 11 years ago

Links
- Website: asie.tv5monde.com/Style.aspx

Availability

Streaming media
- Dens TV Indonesia: www.dens.tv/tv-premium/watch/37/tv5%20monde-style-hd

TV5 Monde Style is a TV channel of TV5Monde dedicated to the "French way of life" (l'art de vivre à la française) broadcasting since April 8, 2015 in the Asia-Pacific and Arab world.

While TV5 Monde is already available worldwide with a general channel with news, movies, documentaries, magazines and cultural programming, TV5 Monde Style is concentrating on lifestyle programming. It broadcasts programs in fashion, luxury, hospitality, jewelry, gastronomy, oenology, design, garden art, architecture, cultural and historical heritage.

== Distribution ==
TV5 Monde Style is broadcast mainly in the Middle East and Asia-Pacific region via satellite, with subtitles in several languages (full subtitles in English, traditional Chinese and simplified Chinese, and partial subtitles in Arabic).
