= SBC 3 =

- Country: Seychelles
- Broadcast area: Seychelles
- Headquarters: Victoria, Seychelles

Programming
- Languages: Seychellois Creole; English; French
- Picture format: 1080i HDTV

Ownership
- Owner: Seychelles Broadcasting Corporation
- Sister channels: SBC 1 SBC 2

History
- Launched: 6 December 2017; 8 years ago

Links
- Website: www.sbc.sc

Availability

Terrestrial
- SBC's DTT platform: Channel 3

SBC 3 is a Seychellois free-to-air television channel owned by the Seychelles Broadcasting Corporation. It is an event channel, airing mostly parliamentary proceedings and surplus sporting events.

Broadcasts began on 28 June 2018. On certain occasions, SBC 3 barely airs programming, most notably over the year-end holiday season.

== Programming ==
The type of events seen on SBC 3 includes district meetings, religious events, especially during the pandemic years and sporting events; in 2025, it carried a package of 21 matches of the Club World Cup.

It also carries repeats from SBC 1 and SBC 2, as envisioned in the SBC Charter.
