= SBC 2 =

- Country: Seychelles
- Broadcast area: Seychelles
- Headquarters: Victoria, Seychelles

Programming
- Languages: Seychellois Creole; English; French
- Picture format: 1080i HDTV

Ownership
- Owner: Seychelles Broadcasting Corporation
- Sister channels: SBC 1 SBC 3

History
- Launched: 6 December 2017; 8 years ago

Links
- Website: www.sbc.sc

Availability

Terrestrial
- SBC's DTT platform: Channel 2

SBC 2 is a Seychellois free-to-air television channel owned by the Seychelles Broadcasting Corporation. It started test broadcasts in 2017, evolving into a full channel on 28 June 2018. The channel caters the education and information purpose of the SBC charter, and broadcasts a heavy amount of local programming, as well as the occasional sports and local live events.

== History ==
SBC 2 was first conceived in 2011, when the broadcaster signed an agreement with China Central Television at a time when the DTT service was in its testing phase; it was expected that the service would launch with more local programmes than the existing SBC channel.

SBC 2 was tested in 2017 when the digital terrestrial platform held test signals. On 28 June 2018, full-time broadcasts began; as such, the channel housed repeats of local programming already carried on SBC 1. Like with the existing channel, it broadcast from 6am to midnight; overnight programming consisted of relays of foreign news channels SBC has the rights to.

At the time of launching, SBC lacked the manpower to fill its programming with a fully-local schedule; as such, it started looking at independent production houses to provide content.

== Programming ==
SBC 2 covers parliamentary hearings (which in October 2020 started using robotic cameras).

The channel also houses same-day repeats of the 8pm SBC Nouvel bulletin from SBC 1 at 10pm. A limited number of foreign content is broadcast, as of May 2026, the channel was carrying the French dubs of the Brazilian telenovela Flor do Caribe and Terra e Paixão, programmes offered by Deutsche Welle (such as documentaries and its Afrimaxx programme), selected Premier League matches and the highlights show, and the Québécois series L'ombre de L'épervier. The channel shows a higher proportion of French-language programming compared to SBC 1, which airs more content in English; overall, SBC 2 has a higher amount of Creole programming.
