= Serge Adda =

French businessman (1948–2004)

- Born: 19 September 1948; Tunis
- Died: 6 November 2004 (aged 56); Paris
- Occupation: President of TV5
- Parent(s): Gladys Adda and Georges Adda

Serge Adda (19 September 1948 in Tunis – 6 November 2004 in Paris) was the president of the French television station TV5.

== Life ==
Adda was born in 1948 to a Tunisian-Jewish family, the son of Gladys Adda and Georges Adda. His parents were both active Tunisian communists and his father was jailed in the 1950s.

Serge became a Franco-Tunisian and an expert in political economy, Adda began his vocational career in 1971 as a researcher at CETEM (Centre d'étude des techniques économiques moderne). From 1975 to 1978, he was a director of research at École Spéciale d'Architecture.

In April 2001, he became an adviser to the president of the Canal+ Horizons group.

Adda was the president of TV5 from 23 October 2001 to his death. TV5 is, after Eurosport, MTV, and CNN, the fourth-largest European broadcaster. Adda emphasized a range of popular television programs.

From 1974 to 1981, he lectured at the University of Paris, and from 1982 to 1989, he was an advisor to UNESCO and the African Development Bank. Married with two children, Karim Adda, he died of cancer.
