= Seychelles Broadcasting Corporation =

State broadcaster of the Seychelles

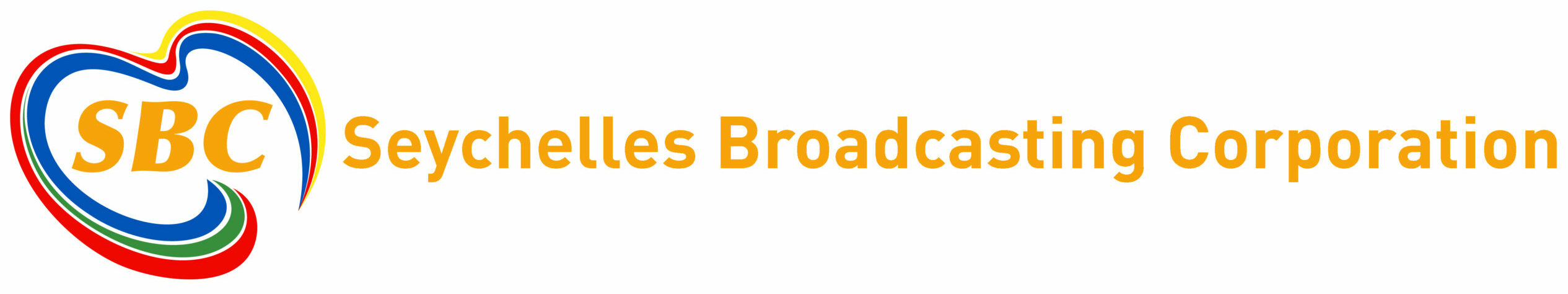

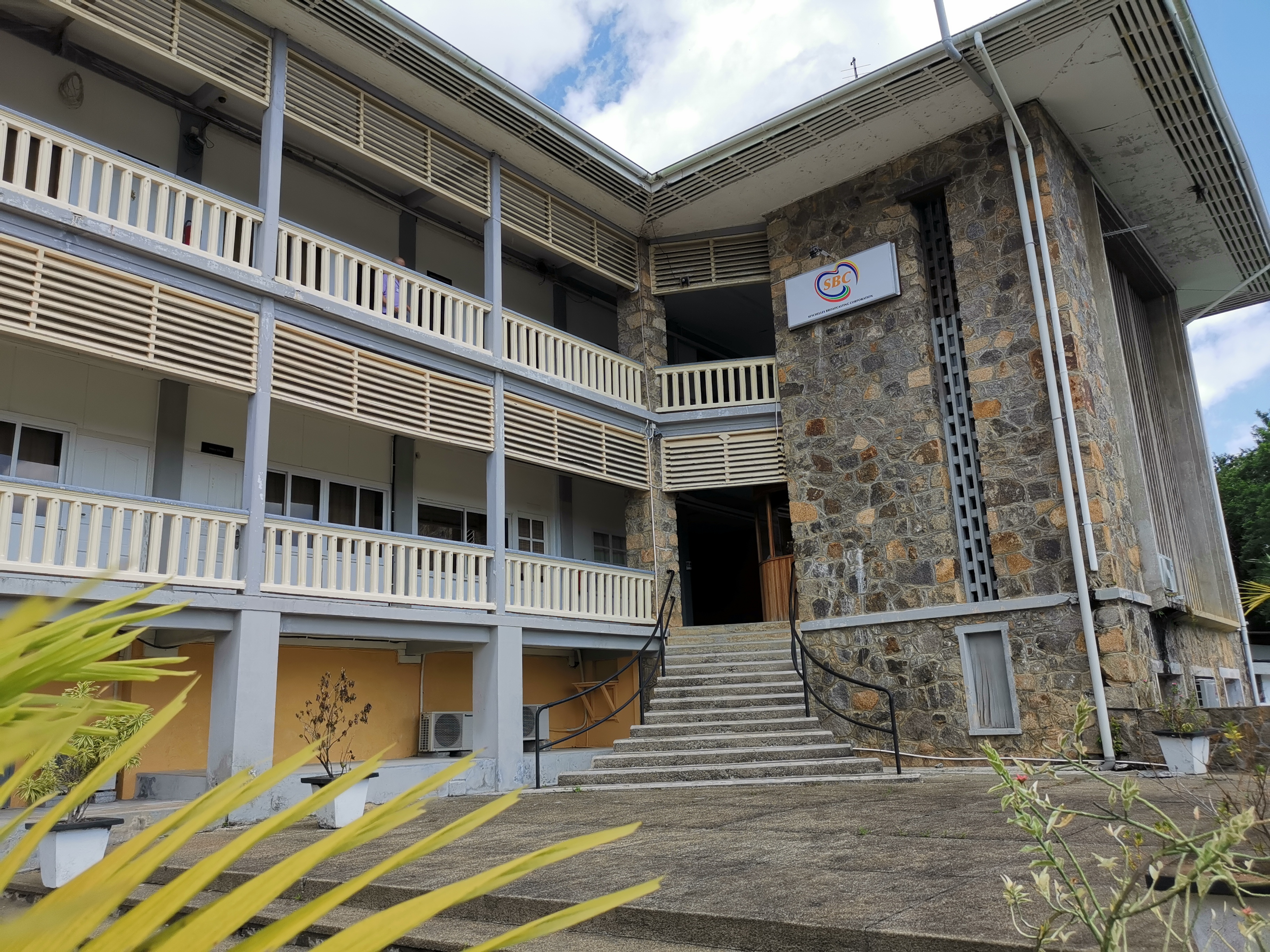
- SBC Headquarters, Hermitage
- Industry: Television and radio broadcasting
- Founded: 20 July 1965
- Headquarters: Hermitage Road, Victoria, Seychelles
- Area served: Seychelles
- Key people: Bérard Duprès, CEO
- Owner: Independent
- Website: Official website

The Seychelles Broadcasting Company (SBC) is the national broadcaster of the Republic of Seychelles with the mandate of informing, educating, and entertaining the population of Seychelles. Located on the hilltop of Hermitage, Mont Fleuri, the SBC owns and operates three television channels namely SBC 1, SBC 2, and SBC 3. In addition, the corporation also owns two of the largest radio station in the country, they are Paradise FM and Radyo Sesel.

The SBC also broadcasts free-to-view international television services on its DTT platform. These channels include Al Jazeera, DW, TV5 Monde, TiVi5, TV5 Lifestyle, CGTN, CGTN French, RT and France 24. The SBC also has the responsibility of relaying 2 international radio stations: Radio France International (RFI) and British Broadcasting Corporation (BBC World Service) on FM.

== History ==
=== Colonial era ===
Radio in the Seychelles was introduced in 1945, when the archipelago was still a British colony; it broadcast for just one hour a day and was initially operated by the Department for Education using the facilities of the telecommunications company. The first regular broadcasts, however, aired from 20 July 1965 with the official foundation of Radyo Sesel, equipped with a studio in Union Vale, near the capital. The staff consisted of a British manager/engineer and twelve local people. The broadcast hours were almost immediately four and a half hours a day in English, French and Creole. Most programs were provided by BBC Transcription Services. Other programs were produced locally or sent by international broadcasting organisations. Among the most popular programs were one about music at lunchtime and another on topics of interest to Creole speakers in the late evening.

In September 1966, Radyo Sesel made his debut in outdoor broadcasts on the occasion of the colonial governor's opening of the National Show, the country's main celebration. Religious ceremonies, choral songs and sports commentary were broadcast.

On 30 May 1971, an explosion occurred at Radyo Sesel's studios in Union Vale, caused by a demolition charge, which totally destroyed the transmitters.

=== After independence ===
In 1977, two years after the country gained independence, Radyo Sesel was equipped with its first outdoor vehicle, which made it possible to carry out live programs such as Tea Time Music. The staff was enriched by the arrival on the scene of new names such as Douglas Cedras, Jeris Moses and Marie-Cécile Medor, who led from various places in Mahé island. The hours of the schedule reached 65 per week.

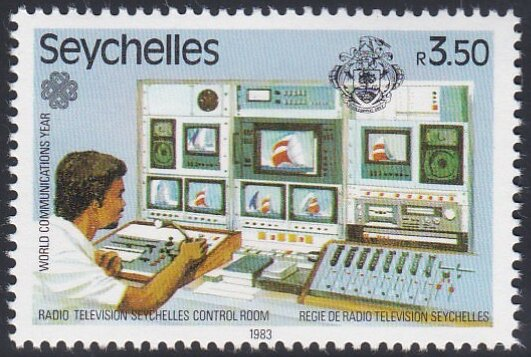
A 1983 stamp depicting the television control room of the newly-launched Radio Television Seychelles television service

In 1980, a television unit was established in Bel Eau to produce video programs for the Ministry of Education; on 31 December 1982 the first public television service was launched with Radio Television Seychelles (RTS), broadcasting from Hermitage every weekend from Friday to Sunday. During this phase, RTS started its television programmes at 5 or 6pm and ended at 10:30pm. The French news bulletin aired at 6pm, while the English bulletin aired at 8:30pm.

In 1986, TV was already accessible to approximately 98% of the population, having now achieved almost complete coverage. In 1989 RTS Television began broadcasting 7 days a week. Thanks to the installation of a satellite dish at the Hermitage in 1991, Seychellois viewers could watch CNN, which was relayed by RTS. In late March 1992, members of newly-legalised political parties reached an agreement with RTS to provide media coverage on their actions.

On 1 May 1992, following the reintroduction of the multi-party political system, RTS, previously a government broadcaster under the direct control of the Ministry of Information, became the Seychelles Broadcasting Corporation (SBC), an independent public broadcasting service.

On 30 May 1997, the Paradise FM radio station was launched, complementary to the already existing AM radio service.

The TV weather segments produced by the National Meteorological Services were overhauled in August 2005, following a training programme initiated by the UK Met Office.

In March 2010, SBC renewed its television programming, placing greater attention on the production of local programs. Seasonal programs were introduced and the schedule was extended to 24 hours thanks to the advent of an automatic broadcasting system.

In November 2011, SBC expanded the airtime of CCTV-News from four hours to six, with the aim of delivering a 24-hour relay upon digitalization.

On 9 September 2012, SBC revamped its graphics and expanded the airtime of the 6pm French and 7pm English bulletins to make them more comprehensive. Local programming was increased, as well as the creation of a television operating base in Praslin.

In May 2018, the Union Vale building was demolished to make way for the construction of the new SBC House. The radio staff was transferred to SBC's headquarters in Hermitage.

On 28 June 2018, SBC switched to digital television technology, bringing its bouquet to 10 TV channels and 4 radio stations, all free. Coinciding with that, SBC unveiled a new logo, which represents a coco-de-mer.

In October 2018, Radyo Sesel started broadcasting 24 hours a day.

The first annual Paradise FM Music Awards was held in December 2019, recognizing artists who have reached the top of the charts in the weekly Paradise FM Chart Attack show.

In July 2020, analog TV technology was officially and permanently shut down.

In August 2021, Radyo Sesel launched on the two subscription television companies, Cable & Wireless and Intelvision, as means to combat deteriorating AM reception.

In May 2022, SBC launched 'Leko', an audio on demand service available through Radyo Sesel and Paradise FM mobile applications. Radyo Sesel shut down its AM signal on 8 March 2024 at 3pm.

China gifted SBC technical equipment in 2024, for the construction of SBC's new headquarters. The headquarters' construction was also supported by a grant from China.

== Governance ==
The SBC is guided by Article 168 of the Constitution which makes provision for a State-funded but Independent broadcasting corporation.

1. The State shall ensure that all broadcasting media which it owns or controls or which receive a contribution from the public fund are so constituted and managed that they may operate independently of the State and of the political or other influence of other bodies, persons or political parties.
2. For the purposes of clause (1), the broadcasting media referred to in that clause shall, subject to this Constitution and any other law, afford opportunities and facilities for the presentation of divergent views.

The SBC Act of 2011 established SBC as an independent corporate body administered by a board of directors, appointed by the President of the Republic. In 2017, amendments to the SBC Act (SBC Amendment Act 2017) changed the manner in which board members were appointed and introduced the post of Deputy CEO.

== Services ==
=== Television ===
Name	Headquarters	Type	Launch	Language
SBC 1	Victoria	Generalist (airs most of the premiere content)	1983	English, French and Creole
SBC 2	Victoria	Generalist (airs mainly entertainment, educational programming, archived content, live sessions of the National Assembly and live external broadcasts, including the main sporting events)	2017	English, French and Creole
SBC 3	Victoria	Generalist (dedicated mainly to special events, such as press conferences, and repeats of programs already shown by SBC1 and SBC2)	2018	English, French and Creole

SBC 2 started broadcasting in 2017, simultaneously with the carriage of the TV5MONDE package of channels, as well as France 24, CGTN and RT, with the launch of digital terrestrial television.

=== Radio ===
Name	Headquarters	Type	Launch	Language
Paradise FM	Victoria	FM generalist service	1997	English, French and Creole
Radyo Sesel	Victoria	AM generalist service	1965	English, French and Creole

SBC is also responsible for the relays of RFI and the BBC World Service.

=== SBC+ ===
SBC+ is the corporation's OTT service. It provides streams of all SBC TV and radio channels, as well as the foreign channels SBC distributes on the terrestrial network. It launched in December 2024.
