= TiVi5 Monde =

TiVi5MONDE
- Country: France
- Broadcast area: France; Europe; United States; Americas; Africa; Middle-East
- Affiliates: TiVi5MONDE USA; TiVi5MONDE Afrique; TiVi5MONDE Maghreb Orient
- Headquarters: Paris, France

Programming
- Language: French
- Picture format: 480i/576i SDTV, 1080i HDTV

Ownership
- Owner: TV5Monde, S.A.
- Sister channels: TV5Monde; TV5Monde Cinéma; TV5 Monde Style; TV5 Québec Canada; Unis

History
- Launched: January 31, 2012; 14 years ago (United States); June 11, 2016; 10 years ago (Africa); January 28, 2022; 4 years ago; (Middle East and North Africa)

Links
- Webcast: Watch online (SD)
- Website: www.tivi5mondeplus.com

Availability

Terrestrial
- DTT (Ghana): SD
- StarSat (South Africa): Channel 700
- Zuku TV (Kenya): Channel 803
- DTT (Mauritius): MBC 17

Streaming media
- Sling TV: Internet Protocol television

TiVi5 Monde (French pronunciation: [ti vi sɛ̃k mɔ̃d]), stylized as TiVi5 MONDE, is an international pay television channel launched at the end of January 2012 by the Francophone network TV5 Monde, which is aimed to children (4–13 years). Its main goal is to teach French to young children through dedicated programs.

In the other regions, TiVi5 Monde is a block on TV5 Monde.

== History ==
The channel was launched in the United States in 2012 exclusively on Dish Network. On June 11, 2016, the channel was launched in Africa, exclusively on Canalsat Horizons, StarSat, and Zuku TV. On January 28, 2022, the channel was launched in the Middle East and North Africa exclusively on Arabsat.
