= Intelvision =

Intelvision is a Seychellois operator of cable television and internet services. It was founded in 2004 and competes with Cable & Wireless Seychelles.

== History ==
Intelvision started its cable TV services on 9 October 2004, initially limited to North Mahé. The vast majority of the channels was sourced from pan-African satellite television operator DStv and launched with 38 channels in a three-package system (Executive with 15 channels, Prestige with 30 and Extravaganza with 38). Although the cable network covered 80% of Mahé, there were still technical difficulties to be sorted out, eventually enabling an islandwide rollout in November. By October 2005, the Extravaganza package was the most popular, largely owing to the SuperSport and M-Net movie channels. In April 2006, it began delivering telephone and internet services, becoming the third such company in the country to do so. In June, it opened its own channel, Intelvision One, airing US series and movies, as well as Latin American telenovelas. It also planned introducing local content in the future.

The company announced a US$2 million infrastructure upgrade in July 2007. It also planned the introduction of PVR and Dual View decoders within four months. Standard decoders were also set to be replaced by new ones free of charge to existing subscribers; the newer decoders were available as an extra subscription. The telephone infrastructure, including the local earth station, were also being upgraded.

On 22 November 2013, Intelvision started broadcasting in the Praslin area, from a microwave link close to its offices in the Pension Fund Building in Grand Anse.

Still in 2007, Intelvision's content agreement with Multichoice ended, while in early May 2014, relays of DStv's channels were removed, causing it to operate a limited service for three weeks. Company president Mukesh Valabhji said that the channels were replaced by "better quality channels", but customers complained because of the constant repetition of programs. Multichoice said that, since 2007, Intelvision had been rebroadcasting its channels illegally.

Over time, Intelvision lost its dominance in the multichannel television sector to DStv itself and SBC's package of free-to-air terrestrial channels.

In March 2017, it launched its unlimited broadband service CRIMSON.

On 20 April 2023, the 2Africa cable system landed in Seychelles, enabling the company to use the submarine cable. It was expected to be operational from September.
