= North Mahé =

North Mahé is a region of Seychelles.
