= Vivianne Fock Tave =

Seychellois diplomat

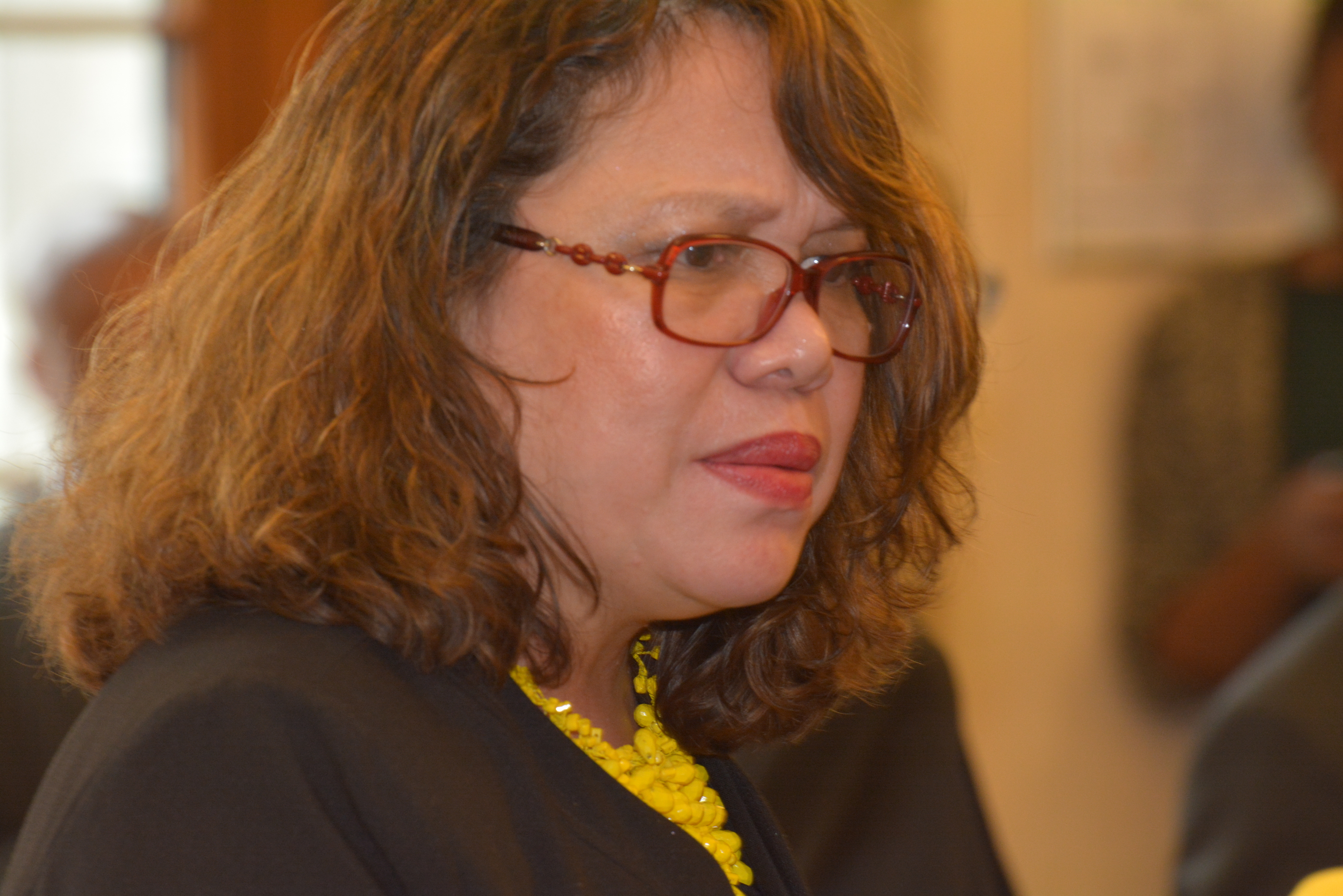
Vivianne Fock Tave at the WTO General Council meeting in December 2014

Vivianne Simone Fock Tave is the Seychellois Permanent Representative of Seychelles to the United Nations and Ambassador to the United States. She is the daughter of Gontran Fock Tave and Agnezina (née Belle).

She holds a Master’s degree in economics from the Technische Universität Berlin.

In 2010, she was accredited as Ambassador to the Netherlands and Luxembourg. In 2012, she became the first Ambassador to Hungary from the Seychelles. She was the Ambassador of Seychelles to Belgium and the European Union. In 2015, she became the ambassador to the People's Republic of China. She was also Ambassador of Seychelles to the Vatican and is the first female Seychelles Ambassador to occupy this role. Following that she served as the Principal Secretary of Foreign Affairs in the Ministry of Foreign Affairs and Tourism for Seychelles. In December 2025 she was accredited as the Permanent Representative of Seychelles to the United Nations and Ambassador to the United States. She speaks Seychellois Creole, English, German and French.
