= TV5 Québec Canada =

Canadian French language specialty television channel

- Country: Canada
- Broadcast area: National
- Headquarters: Montreal, Quebec

Programming
- Picture format: 1080i (HDTV) (downscaled to letterboxed 480i for the SDTV feed)

Ownership
- Owner: Le Consortium de télévision Québec Canada (Canadian Broadcasting Corporation, Télé-Quebec, TFO, Association des producteurs de films et de télévision du Québec)
- Sister channels: TV5 Unis

History
- Launched: September 1, 1988

Links
- Website: tv5unis.ca (in French)

TV5 Québec Canada (abbreviated to TV5) is a Canadian French-language specialty channel that focuses primarily on programming from international French-speaking broadcasters.

The channel shares a broadcast licence with its sister network, TV5 Unis, a channel devoted to broadcasting programming primarily focusing on Canadian French-speaking communities, in particular, those living outside of Quebec.

== History ==
The idea of a Canadian feed of TV5Monde, then known simply as TV5 Canada, was first proposed in 1986 when the Consortium de télévision Québec Canada (Television Consortium Québec Canada in English), comprising CBC/Radio Canada, Télé-Quebec, TFO and the Association des producteurs de films et de télévision du Québec, joined the TV5 consortium the same year. The proposed channel underwent a CRTC hearing on specialty channel applications in July 1987, and TV5 Québec Canada was launched on September 1, 1988, as the spiritual successor to the cable television channel TVFQ 99 (fr), which was originally launched in 1979 as a joint venture between Vidéotron and the French Ministry of Foreign Affairs to rebroadcast TF1, Antenne 2 and FR3 programming in Canada.

== Overview ==
TV5 Québec Canada has a partnership with TV5Monde, the second-most-widely distributed network in the world, reaching over 180 million households in over 200 countries. Unlike TV5Monde, which is based in Paris, France, and supervises the distribution of signals to all continents, TV5 Québec Canada is headquartered in Montreal, Quebec, and is owned by the non-profit group Le Consortium de télévision Québec Canada inc. (CTQC), which distributes and manages the channel in Canada.

As with the TV5Monde consortium, CTQC is also a co-operative organisation currently structured as follows: one representative from each of the following, Canadian Broadcasting Corporation (also known as Radio-Canada), Télé-Québec, TFO, and the Association des producteurs de films et de télévision du Québec (APFTQ) with two representatives appointed by the minister of Canadian Heritage, two others by Quebec's minister responsible for culture and communications and its minister responsible for international relations, and the remaining member of the board of directors is the president and CEO of CTQC.

== Programming ==
TV5 broadcasts a variety of French-language programming from Canada and around the world, including drama, sports, documentaries and information programming among a variety of other genres.

Canadian content is provided primarily by Télé-Québec and TFO, while foreign programming comes from the France Télévisions group, Arte France, RTBF (French language public broadcaster in Belgium), RTS (French language public broadcaster in Switzerland) and CIRTEF (council representing French-speaking Africa).

Ici Radio-Canada Télé and TVA are also partners in TV5 and provide programming to the international parent channel, but as both are already widely available across Canada, most of their programming is replaced on the Canadian version by content from Télé-Québec and TFO.

Unlike most other Canadian licensed channels, especially analogue licensed, TV5 Québec Canada airs a considerably lower amount of Canadian content than other Canadian services: only 15% during its entire broadcasting day and 15% in primetime. Of that amount, it presents at least 104 hours of original first-run Canadian programming per year.

== HD ==
On June 10, 2009, TV5 launched its own HD simulcast.
