= TV5Monde =

French television network

- Country: France
- Broadcast area: Worldwide
- Headquarters: Paris, France

Programming
- Language: French
- Picture format: 1080i 16:9 HDTV (SECAM/PAL/NTSC)

Ownership
- Owner: France Télévisions: 46.42% France Médias Monde: 11.97% Radio télévision suisse (RTS): 10.53% Radio-télévision belge de la Communauté française (RTBF): 10.53% CBC/Radio-Canada (SRC): 6.32% TVMonaco: 5.26% Télé-Québec: 4.21% ARTE France: 3.12% Institut national de l'audiovisuel (INA): 1.65%
- Parent: TV5Monde, S.A.
- Sister channels: TV5 Monde Style, TiVi5 Monde, TV5Monde Info, TV5 Québec Canada, Unis

History
- Launched: 2 January 1984; 42 years ago
- Former names: TV5 (1984–1989, 1993–2006); TV5 Europe (1989–1993)

Links
- Website: www.tv5monde.com

Availability

Terrestrial
- Analogue television: in Kinshasa, Pointe-Noire, Mauritania, Cape Verde, Mauritius and Seychelles
- Digital terrestrial television (Greece): ERT B only in Athens and Thessaloniki
- Virgin Media (UK): Channel 825 (TV5Monde Europe)
- DStv (Sub-Saharan Africa): Channel 435 (TV5Monde Afrique)
- StarTimes: Channel 639 (TV5Monde Afrique)
- Zuku TV (Kenya): Channel 814 (TV5Monde Afrique) (Zuku Fiber only)
- TrueVisions (Thailand): Channel 788 (TV5Monde Asie)

Streaming media
- Ziggo GO (Netherlands): ZiggoGO.tv
- Sling TV: Internet Protocol television

TV5Monde (French pronunciation: [te ve sɛ̃k mɔ̃d]), formerly known as TV5, is a French public television network, broadcasting several channels of French-language programming. It is an approved participant member of the European Broadcasting Union.

The network is available across Europe on satellite via Astra 19.2°E and Eutelsat Hot Bird (13°E) (both free-to-air), online and via TVPlayer.

== Summary ==
TV5 started on 2 January 1984 and was under the management of Serge Adda until his death in November 2004. The next director from 6 April 2005 was Jean-Jacques Aillagon, a former French Minister for Culture and Communication. The director-general is now Marie-Christine Saragosse.

In January 2006, TV5 underwent a major overhaul, including rebranding as "TV5Monde" to stress its focus as a global network ("Monde" is French for "World"). Also, the changes included a new schedule and a new program line-up. Since 1993, "TV5 Monde" is part of the channel's corporate name. Its Canadian operations are branded "TV5 Québec Canada", but the shorter version TV5 is also used.

== History ==
TV5 was formed on 2 January 1984, under the guidance of Claude Cheysson, the French Minister for Foreign Affairs, and TV5 President Serge Adda, by five public television channels: TF1, Antenne 2 and FR3 from France, the Swiss Télévision Suisse Romande and the Belgian RTBF. The "5" from the name TV5 comes from the five public broadcasters. On 18 December 1985, TV5 was amongst the first four channels carried by cable television in France, inaugurated in Cergy-Pontoise. As of 1987, the channel broadcast eight hours a day; the first original programme produced for the channel was the game show Le juste mot, co-financed by the French Foreign Ministry, followed in January 1987 by Le club de l'Europe, produced by TV5 members FR3 and RTBF and with the support of the European Commission, a programme about European news, whose first invitee was Jacques Delors.

Following its privatisation in 1987, TF1 retired from the TV5 consortium but continued to supply its programmes to the channel until 1995. On 1 September 1988, TV5 Québec Canada was created, followed by TV5 Afrique in 1991. The following year, TV5 transmitted using digital compression towards Latin America and the Caribbean. Its coverage was expanded in 1996 with the launch of its Asian-Pacific signal with TV5 Asie-Pacifique and the subscription channel TV5 États-Unis in the United States. Two years later, the Middle East feed was launched with TV5 Moyen-Orient in 1998.

In 1997, TV5Monde had an "insufficient" three-hour content agreement with The International Channel. Since October 1996, plans were made to launch a dedicated feed of the channel for the United States and Latin America, to be delivered using the Panamsat 3 satellite.

In early 1999, TV5 split its European signal into two, with the launch of TV5 France Belgique Suisse, a signal specific to Francophone Europe (France, Belgium, Switzerland, Monaco, Luxembourg). TV5 Europe continued to serve the wider continental audience.

A consortium formed by public channels Arte and La Cinquième entered into the capital of the channel, which brought with it new sources of programming. A new schedule was constructed, centred on news programmes such as news flashes on the hour, two TV5 bulletins and rebroadcasts of its partners' main news programmes (20 Heures from France 2, Soir 3 from France 3, Le Journal from TSR/RTS and 13 Heures from RTBF).

A meeting with ministers from TV5 in Vevey, Switzerland, gave a mandate to the channel's council of co-operation to reform the structure of the channel in the view of creating a unique worldwide channel. The national governments in charge of the five participants gave an agreement to turn management of TV5 États-Unis and TV5 Amérique Latine over to TV5 Monde, the new name for the channel's head operations in Paris.

From the September 11 attacks in 2001 to the 2003 Iraq War, the media coverage put the spotlight on TV5's particular way of broadcasting news bulletins from its member public broadcasters. International conflicts arising from the decision to go to war by the United States and the United Kingdom in which France notably refused to participate had relaunched the debate over whether to create an international news channel from a French perspective, resulting in the 2006 launch of France 24.

With the creation of France 24 placing TV5's own existence in doubt, its new CEO, Jean-Jacques Aillagon decided from 1 January 2006 to rename the channel to TV5Monde to underline its status better as the only international Francophone channel available on-air (France 24 was then available only in Europe, the Middle East, Africa and the United States cities of New York and Washington, DC, in French). Aillagon stepped down from his post on 3 March 2006.

The name TV5Monde applies only to its eight different signals, broadcast from its Paris headquarters. In Canada, such as in French-speaking Quebec, TV5 Quebec Canada is managed from Montreal, which keeps the original name "TV5", as it is operated by an independent company that is distinct from TV5Monde. As well as being part of the TV5 family, TV5 Quebec Canada has its own management and its schedule is made with the Canadian viewer in mind and to conform to Canadian broadcast regulations, which, sets domestic production quotas and limits foreign investors to a minority stake.

In 2007, a new programme schedule saw the reduction of programming from France Télévisions (France 2, 3 and 5), for example, ti one daily news bulletin from France 2 by abandoning France 3's midday news programme. In 2008, TV5Monde became part of holding company France Monde.

In 2009, TV5Monde split its Asia-Pacific signal into two, one of them being TV5Monde Asie, a feed for territories located between GMT+8 (Hong Kong) and GMT+12 (New Zealand). TV5Monde's Pacific signal is an adaptation of its existing Asian signal that has been adopted to its time zones to serve its viewers better. It currently broadcasts in Oceania and, despite the signal's name, in Japan, South Korea and South East Asia.

On 25 February 2015, the new signal TV5Monde Brésil was launched broadcasting its programming with Portuguese subtitles.

Monaco was announced to be joining the service with its public service broadcaster, TVMonaco (formerly called Monte-Carlo Riviera TV before its launch), from 1 September 2023.

On 8 May 2026, the National Communication Observatory in Niger suspended TV5Monde due to its "repeated dissemination of content likely to seriously undermine public order, national unity, social cohesion, and the stability of republican institutions". The decision was criticised by the Committee to Protect Journalists as "censorship".

=== April 2015 cyberattack and resulting disruption ===
On the evening of 8 April 2015, TV5Monde was the victim of a cyberattack by a hacker group known as "CyberCaliphate", which claimed to have ties to the terrorist organization Islamic State of Iraq and the Levant (ISIL). The hackers breached the broadcaster's internal systems in what Director Yves Bigot described as an "unprecedented" attack, overriding TV5Monde's broadcast programming for over three hours, with service only partially restored in the early hours of the following morning. Normal broadcasting services were still disrupted late into 9 April. Various computerised internal administrative and support systems including e-mail were also still shut down or otherwise inaccessible because of the attack. The hackers also hijacked TV5Monde's Facebook and Twitter pages to post the personal information of relatives of French soldiers participating in actions against the organization, along with messages critical of President François Hollande arguing that the January 2015 terrorist attacks were "gifts" for his "unforgivable mistake" of partaking in conflicts that "[serve] no purpose".

As part of the official response to the attack, the French Minister of Culture and Communications, Fleur Pellerin, called for an emergency meeting of the heads of various major media outlets and groups. The meeting took place on 10 April at an undisclosed location. French Prime Minister Manuel Valls called the attack "an unacceptable insult to freedom of information and expression". A colleague in his cabinet, the Interior Minister Bernard Cazeneuve, attempted to allay public concern by stating that France "had already increased its anti-hacking measures to protect against cyber-attacks" since the aforementioned terrorist attacks on January earlier that year, which had left a total of 20 people dead.

French investigators later discounted the theory that the attack was connected to ISIL but instead suspected the APT28 or Pawn Storm, a hacking group with alleged links to the Russian government. Investigators concluded that the attack was a test of the same sorts of cyberweaponry that were used to switch off a power station in Ukraine.

As a result, Airbus Defence and Space implemented the Keelback Net cybersensor.

== Content ==
Most of its content is taken from mainstream networks in the French-speaking world, notably France Télévisions from France, TVMonaco from Monaco, RTBF from Belgium, RTS from Switzerland and the Radio-Canada and TVA networks in Canada. In addition to international news, TV5Monde broadcasts Ligue 1, Coupe de France final, France Six Nations matches, films and music magazines.

== Ownership ==
The number "5" in the name is the number of founding networks: Télévision Française 1 (TF1), Antenne 2 (France 2), FR 3 (France 3), TSR (RTS Un) and RTBF (La Une). The partnership making up the TV5Monde consortium are France Télévisions, Arte France, Institut national de l'audiovisuel, Canadian Broadcasting Corporation, TVMonaco, Télé-Québec, RTBF and RTS. The consortium owns 51% of the service, and the other 49% is owned by France Médias Monde, a holding company that manages France's international broadcasting services.

- France Télévisions: 46.42%
- France Médias Monde: 11.97%
- Radio télévision suisse (RTS): 10.53%
- Radio-télévision belge de la Communauté française (RTBF): 10.53%
- CBC/Société Radio-Canada (SRC): 6.32%
- TVMonaco: 5.26%
- Télé-Québec: 4.21%
- ARTE France: 3.12%
- Institut national de l'audiovisuel (INA): 1.65%

== Channels ==
Nine feeds are being transmitted:

- TV5MONDE France Belgique Suisse Monaco (France, Belgium, Switzerland, Monaco, Andorra and Luxembourg)
- TV5MONDE Europe (rest of Europe) with subtitles in French, English, German, Dutch, Romanian, Russian, and Spanish
- TV5MONDE Afrique (Sub-Saharan Africa)
- TV5MONDE Maghreb Orient (Maghreb, Middle East) with subtitles in Arabic
- TV5MONDE Asie (Asia except Japan and Korea) with subtitles in English and Vietnamese
- TV5MONDE Pacifique (Japan, Korea and Oceania) with subtitles in English, Korean and Japanese
- TV5MONDE États-Unis (United States) with subtitles in English*
- TV5MONDE Amérique Latine (Latin America and the Caribbean) with subtitles in Spanish and Portuguese
- TV5 Québec Canada (Canada)**

(*)TV5MONDE États-Unis has certain programs subtitled in English, particularly some newscasts and most movies. It is unusual to watch a French movie without English language subtitles on TV5MONDE États-Unis.
(**)TV5 Québec Canada is produced in Montreal.

== Logos ==
The digital on-screen graphic was located on the upper right corner of the screen from 1991 to 2003, when it was moved to the upper left corner of the screen.

TV5 Europe logo, 1984–1988
(used in Canada and United States from 1988–1991).

TV5 Europe logo, 1988–1991.

TV5 Europe logo, 1991–1995.

TV5 logo, 1995–2006. Logo is still in use by TV5 Québec Canada.

TV5MONDE logo, 2006–2009.

TV5MONDE logo, 2009–2021.

TV5MONDE logo, 2021–2025.

TV5MONDE logo since 2025.

== Network availability ==
=== Europe ===
TV5Monde Europe is widely available through cable and IPTV providers across Europe. Programmes are broadcast in French, with optional subtitles in Dutch, English, French, German, Romanian, Russian and Spanish, subject to availability. In the United Kingdom, TV5Monde Europe was withdrawn from Sky on 30 November 2018 and from Virgin Media in January 2019, with free online streaming introduced as an alternative.

TV5Monde Europe is also broadcast free-to-air via Astra 19.2°E, Hot Bird at 13°E, Eutelsat 9B at 9°E, Hellas Sat at 39°E and Intelsat 10-02 at 0.8°W. The separate TV5Monde France Belgique Suisse (FBS) feed is distributed in France, Belgium and Switzerland, and is also available free-to-air via Astra and Intelsat 10-02.

TV5Monde is subject to must-carry requirements in French-speaking Belgium and Switzerland, as well as in Romania and Moldova. TV5Monde Europe is also available free-to-air through digital terrestrial television via the Hellenic Broadcasting Corporation (ERT) in Greece and in Italy's Aosta Valley.

=== Middle East and North Africa ===
TV5Monde Maghreb-Orient is broadcast free-to-air across the Middle East and North Africa via Nilesat 201 at 7°W and Badr 4 at 26°E, with Arabic subtitles. The channel is also distributed through cable and IPTV providers in the region.

=== Africa ===
TV5Monde Afrique is distributed across sub-Saharan Africa through free-to-air satellite broadcasts, cable, IPTV and subscription television services. The channel is available via SES-5 at 5°E and through regional television providers. In Mauritius, the Mauritius Broadcasting Corporation also carries TiVi5Monde on MBC 17.

In May 2025, the High Authority for Communication in Mali ordered TV5Monde removed from authorised television distribution services following its coverage of opposition demonstrations. On 5 May 2026, authorities in Burkina Faso banned the channel, citing allegations of disinformation and glorification of terrorism. On 8 May 2026, Niger also suspended TV5Monde and several other French media outlets, citing concerns about public order and national security.

=== North America ===
==== Canada ====
In Canada, TV5 Québec Canada operates a French-language television service featuring international francophone programming alongside Canadian productions. It also operates Unis TV, which focuses on French-speaking communities across Canada. Both services are distributed under a common broadcasting licence and are subject to mandatory carriage requirements established by the Canadian Radio-television and Telecommunications Commission (CRTC).

==== United States ====
In the United States, TV5Monde États-Unis is distributed as a subscription television service through cable, satellite and streaming providers, including Dish Network, Verizon Fios, Spectrum, Xfinity, Sling TV and Fubo. The channel is available in both standard and high definition, depending on the provider. Programming is primarily in French, with English subtitles available for selected programmes.

Additional services include the French-language children's channel TiVi5Monde and TV5Monde Cinema on Demand, which offers a selection of French-language films through participating television and streaming providers.

=== Latin America and the Caribbean ===
TV5Monde Amérique Latine is distributed through cable, satellite and subscription television providers across Mexico, Central America, the Caribbean and South America. The channel offers French-language programming with subtitles in Spanish, Portuguese and English, depending on the programme.

=== Asia, Australia and New Zealand ===
TV5Monde is distributed throughout the Asia-Pacific region through satellite, cable, IPTV and online services. Its regional feeds include TV5Monde Asie, serving South and Southeast Asia, and TV5Monde Pacifique, serving Northeast Asia and Oceania. Satellite distribution is provided through the AsiaSat network, with the Pacifique feed added to AsiaSat 5 in 2022. TV5Monde Asie-Pacifique operates two regional feeds: TV5Monde Asie, serving South and Southeast Asia, and TV5Monde Pacifique, serving Northeast Asia and Oceania. Programmes are available with subtitles in several languages, including English, French, Vietnamese, Japanese and Korean, depending on the feed and programme.

== HD ==
High-definition (HD) broadcasting of TV5MONDE FBSM started on 1 July 2015 via satellite in the CanalSat mux as an upscaled HD feed. In March 2017, the HD feed was changed from upscaled into native HD (1440x1080).

TV5MONDE Maghreb-Orient has been broadcast in HD since 10 March 2014 via Badr-4.

TV5MONDE Asie has been broadcast in HD in Taiwan since September 2014 and Singapore via StarHub TV since October 2015.

== See also ==
- TiVi5 Monde
- Denise Epoté, head of TV5MONDE Africa
