= Hana Sofia Lopes =

Luxembourgish-Portuguese actress

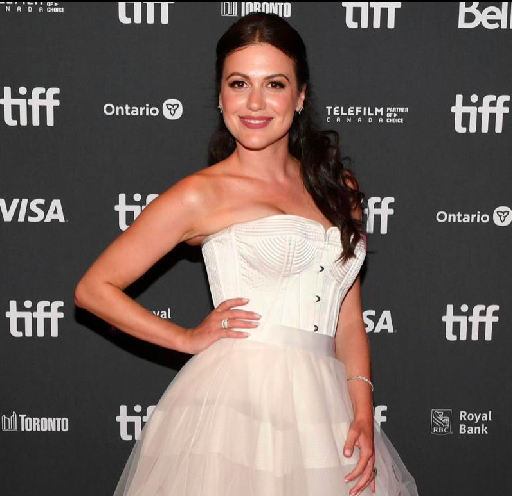
- Hana Sofia Lopes at the Toronto International Film Festival
- Born: 5 March 1990 (age 36); Luxembourg
- Education: Lisbon Theatre and Film School; Conservatoire national supérieur d'art dramatique
- Occupation: Actress
- Years active: 2011–present

Hana Sofia Lopes (born 5 March 1990) is a Portuguese-Luxembourgish actress born in Luxembourg.

Trained at the prestigious Conservatoire national supérieur d'art dramatique in Paris, she has appeared in over 60 productions across theatre, film, and television in Europe and North America, demonstrating versatility through languages, genres and cultures.

Her international work includes films such as Kanaval, selected for the Toronto International Film Festival, her leading role in the ZDF thriller Escape from Lisbon, as well as the globally streamed Netflix series Capitani.

She made her film debut opposite fellow Luxembourgish actress Vicky Krieps in Sexual Healing, a biopic about Marvin Gaye directed by Julien Temple.

In 2025, Forbes Portugal published an in-depth profile on Hana Sofia Lopes, highlighting her as an actress emblematic of Europe's cultural soft power. The article, titled "Hana Sofía Lopes Is Proof That European Talent Knows No Borders", emphasizes her cross-cultural work, her multilingual career, and her focus on strong, autonomous female protagonists.

She is fluent in French, German, Luxembourgish, Portuguese, Spanish, English, and Italian.

Lopes holds dual citizenship in Portugal and Luxembourg.

== Biography ==
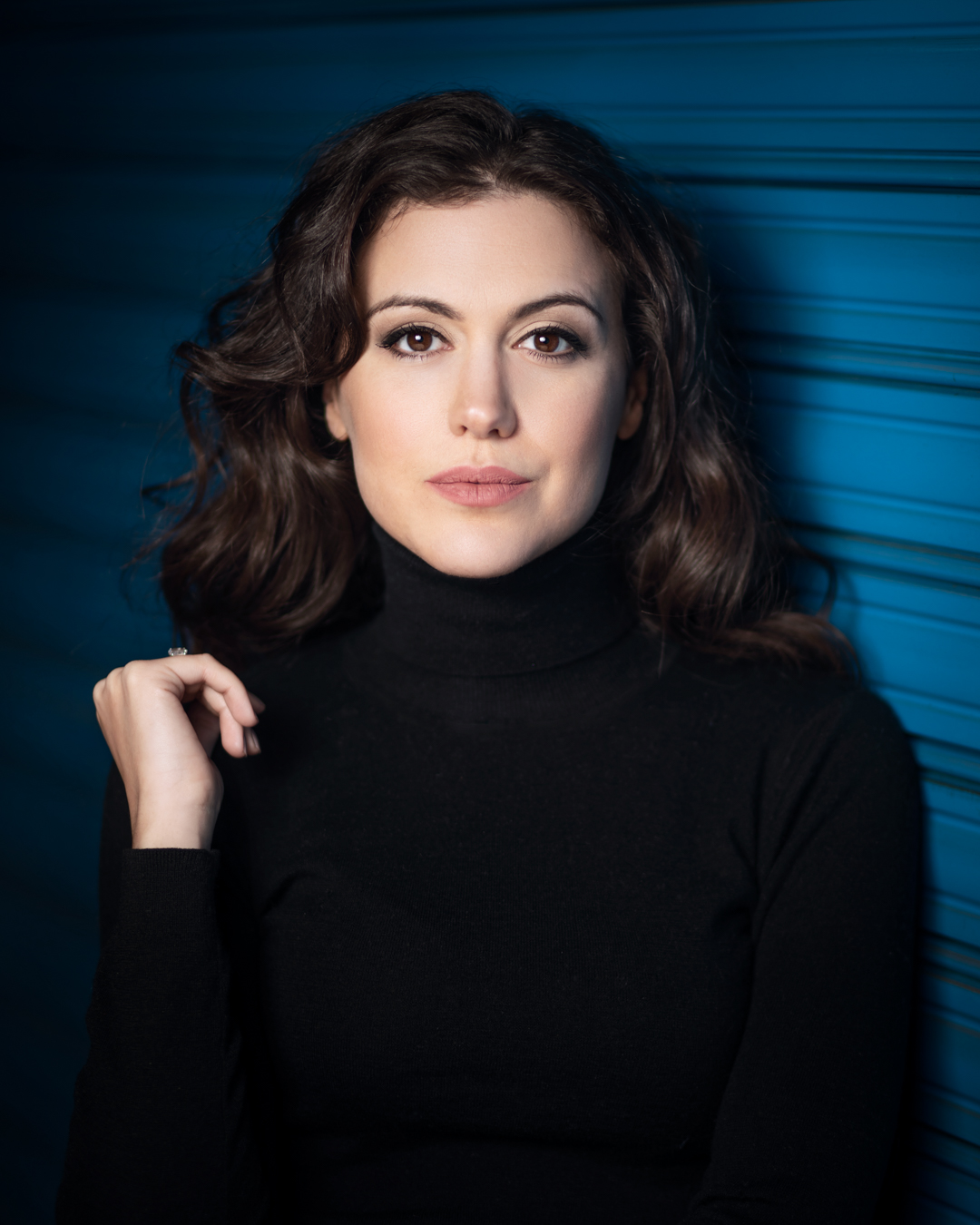
Hana Sofia Lopes in Lisbon

Lopes was born and raised in the Grand Duchy of Luxembourg, to Portuguese parents. Raised in a multilingual environment, she grew up speaking several languages, which later became a defining element of her artistic identity.

After high school at the Athénée de Luxembourg, she studied at the Lisbon Theatre and Film School, from which she graduated in 2012. As part of the Erasmus Programme, she performed a one-year university exchange at the Royal Academy of Dramatic Arts in Madrid (RESAD), Spain in 2011.

She then studied at the Conservatoire national supérieur d'art dramatique, France's National Drama Academy in Paris, in the classes of Daniel Mesguich, Sandy Ouvrier and French choreographer Caroline Marcadé, among others.

During a performance of the Marriage of Figaro at the Paris Drama Academy in 2014, film director Marco Serafini saw her performance on stage and decided to cast her in the leading female role in Toy Gun, a feature film that he was then developing. In this film, she plays the leading female role alongside John Hannah, Anthony LaPaglia and Julian Sands. Her performance in this film has landed her a Best Actress nomination at the Luxembourg Film awards, the Lëtzebuerger Filmpräis, in 2018.

In 2017, she made an appearance in the German TV series Bad Banks directed by German director Christian Schwochow. The series was broadcast on Arte and German broadcaster Zdf. This show marks Hana's first performance in a German-language project.

Subsequently, she played a Spanish anarchist in the Belgian-Spanish film Escapada directed by Sarah Hirtt. Spanish actors Sergi López and María León are also part of the cast.

In 2017 she was part of the cast of Arthur Miller's The Crucible, directed by the English director Douglas Rintoul. The premiere took place at Queen's Theater, Hornchurch in London. In 2018, she played the lead role in the French play Intranquillités, based on the Book of Disquiet by Portuguese author Fernando Pessoa, staged in Luxembourg.

In 2018 she starred alongside Juliette Lewis and Henry Rollins in the Canadian film Dreamland, directed by Bruce McDonald.

=== Rise in Portugal ===
Meanwhile, she has also built a career in Portugal. Her roles in the prime time TV series Mar Salgado (2015) and Coração d'Ouro (2016), co-produced by TV Globo and viewed daily by nearly 2 million viewers, have made her well known to audiences in Portugal. In 2017, she played queen Elizabeth of Aragon, the Queen of Portugal in the historical series Ministério do Tempo broadcast on RTP.

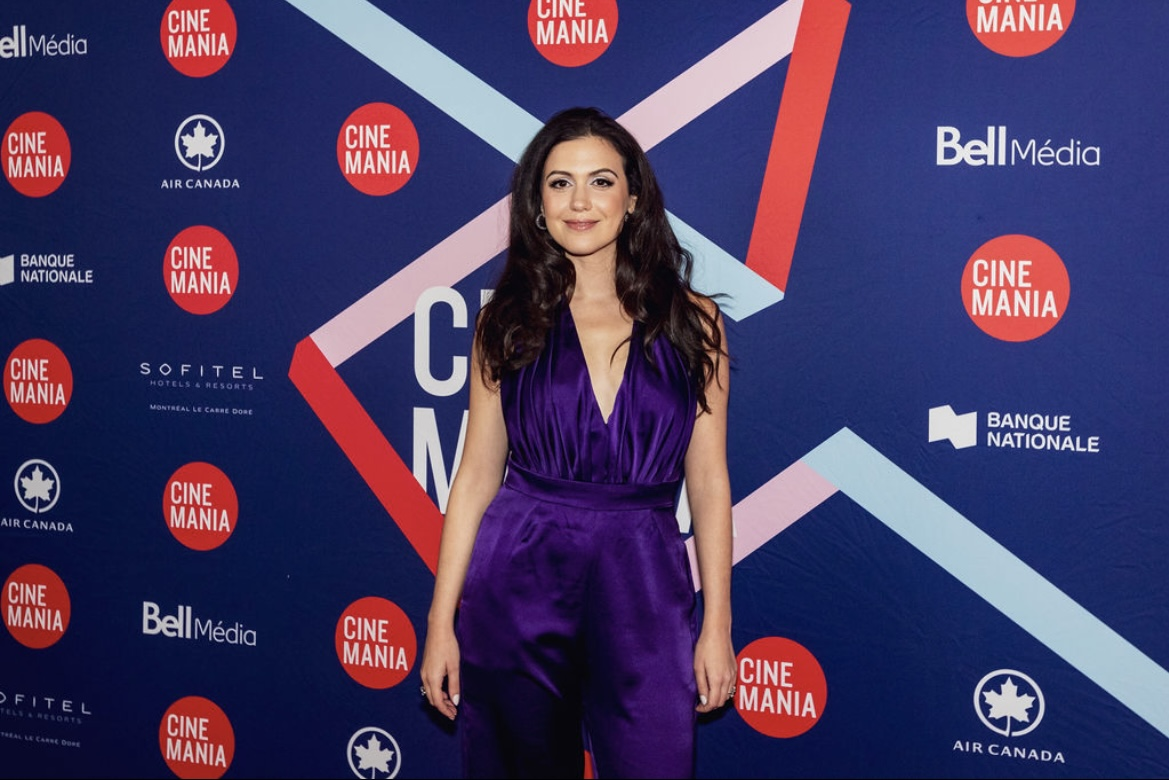
Hana Sofia at the Cinemania Film Festival in Montréal, Canada

=== International Theater presence ===
Between 2020 and 2024, Lopez became more of an actress on the European stage rather than at a national level, performing in twelve productions at many venues such as the Grand Théâtre de la Ville de Luxembourg, the Théâtre des Célestins in Lyon and the São João National Theatre Porto. Notably, she performed in Medea by Euripides (in English) and Hedda Gabler by Ibsen (in French), directed by Marja-Leena Junker.

In 2020 she was cast by French theatre director Michel Didym to play the leading role of Hanele in his production Habiter le temps alongside Irène Jacob and Jérôme Kircher. The production toured France, Switzerland and Belgium between 2020 and 2022.

In 2023, Luxembourgish director Frank Hoffmann, also the artistic director of the Recklinghausen Theatre Festival, created a role for her in his adaptation of The Iceman Cometh by Eugene O'Neill at the Théâtre National du Luxembourg. The production was a resounding success with audiences and will be revived twice between the 2023 and 2025 seasons.

=== World-premiere at the Toronto International Film Festival (TIFF 2023) and Netflix presence ===
Her latest feature film, Kanaval, directed by Canadian-Haitian filmmaker Henri Pardo, marks her rising international presence. Selected at the Toronto International Film Festival in the Centrepiece program, in September 2023, the film won the Amplified Voices Award and received an Honorable Mention for Best Canadian Film, along with four nominations at the Canadian Screen Awards. The film was named to TIFF's annual Canada's Top Ten list for 2023.

In October 2024 Hana Sofia Lopes was a member of the international jury at the CinEast Film Festival, alongside Smoke Sauna Sisterhood director Anna Hints. The jury was chaired by the German-Romanian Oscar nominated director Alexander Nanau. The jury awarded the Grand Prix to the Lithuanian film Toxic, directed by Saulė Bliuvaitė, recognizing its poignant portrayal of adolescent challenges and the strength of its performances.

Lopes plays the role of Maria in the second season of Capitani, streaming globally on Netflix.

=== First leading role on German television ===
In 2025, she was cast by ZDF, Germany's national television broadcaster, in the leading role of the thriller Escape from Lisbon, portraying the character Sofia Moreno alongside Hans Sigl. The film was broadcast on 17 March 2025, on ZDF. With nearly 6 million viewers and a market share of around 23 percent, it was a major success on German television.

German TV critic Rainer Tittelbach praised Hana Sofia Lopes as "a true discovery for German television." Germany's newspaper of record, the Süddeutsche Zeitung, published an interview and profile titled "Here's to the European Identity!" highlighting her cultural depth and versatility.

In 2025, Forbes Portugal published an in-depth portrait about Hana Sofia Lopes, highlighting her multicultural background and her role as an ambassador of a modern European soft power through her work. The article titled "Hana Sofia Lopes is living proof that European talent knows no borders" emphasized her multilingual career, the influence of Luxembourg's multicultural environment on her artistic development, and her growing international presence following the success of Escape from Lisbon.

=== Awards, recognition and recent work (2026-) ===
At the end of 2025, she was nominated for the title of "Luxembourger of the Year" (Lëtzebuergerin vum Joër), a prestigious public-voted national title, awarded annually to influential Luxembourgish personalities.

On 7 January 2026 it was announced that she would co-host the Luxembourg Song Contest 2026, the televised national selection for Luxembourg's entry to the Eurovision Song Contest, alongside RTL presenters Raoul Roos and Loïc Juchem.

In February 2026, she is set to appear in the World Premiere of the play Les Voleurs d'Amour by Nicolas Steil, directed by Frank Hoffmann at the Théâtre National du Luxembourg, marking the fifth consecutive year collaborating with the director. A production that explores themes of trauma, family and emotional memory.

She speaks French, German, English, Portuguese, Luxembourgish, Spanish, and Italian.

== Filmography ==
=== Films ===
- 2010: My Eyes Have Seen You (short) directed by Miguel Leao: Greta
- 2013: Someday (short) directed by Vito Labalestra: Alicia
- 2014: Amour Fou directed by Jessica Hausner: the older sister
- 2015: Ouni Mooss (court) directed by Adolf El Assal: Alice
- 2016: The Survivors directed by Luc Jabon: Lena
- 2019: Toy Gun directed by Marco Serafini: Giulia Redondini
- 2019: Escapade (Escapada) directed by Sarah Hirtt: Lola
- 2019: Dreamland directed by Bruce McDonald: Colero
- 2022: Le retour de la jeunesse de Marcello Merletto et Fabio Bottani: Nilde
- 2023: Personality by Lukas Grevis: the Boxer
- 2023: Sexual Healing directed by Julien Temple: Ivy Keaton
- 2023: Melusina directed by Whitney Fortmueller: Melusina
- 2023: E.A.F. directed by Lucie Wahl: Rapha
- 2024: La bête qui sommeille en nous directed by Jonathan Becker: Violette
- 2024: Kanaval directed by Henri Pardo: Justine
- 2025: Mission 160 directed by Lucie Wahl: Sofia
- 2025: Projeto Global directed by Ivo Ferreira: Jacinta
- 2025: Escape from Lisbon directed by Steffi Doehleman : Sofia Moreno

=== Television ===
- 2012: The Simpsons (voice-over Luxembourgish version): Lindsey Naegle (1 episode)
- 2012: Weemseesdet: Carla (4 episodes)
- 2012–2013: Comeback: Samantha (12 episodes)
- 2013–2014: Os Filhos do Rock: Carla (2 episodes)
- 2015: Mar Salgado: Camila (17 episodes)
- 2015–2016: Coração d'Ouro: Adriana (300 episodes)
- 2017: Bad Banks: Lola (1 episode)
- 2017: Ministério do tempo: the Queen of Portugal (1 episode)
- 2018: Zëmmer ze verlounen: Sophie (12 episodes)
- 2019: GZSZ: Amalia (3 episodes)
- 2022: Capitani 2: Maria – Netflix (6 episodes)
- 2024: O som e a Sílaba: Mathilde Lopes – Disney+ (1 episode)
- 2025: A luta continua: Jacinta - RTP

=== Stage ===
- 2010: Three Sisters by Anton Chekhov at Centro Cultural de Belém, Lisboa
- 2010: Phoenissae by Seneca at ESTC Lisboa
- 2011: Auto da barca do inferno by Gil Vicente at ESTC Lisboa
- 2011: Twelfth Night by William Shakespeare at ESTC Lisboa
- 2011: Peanuts by Fausto Paravidino at Theatre National Luxembourg
- 2012: Que formidable burdel! by Eugène Ionesco at RESAD Madrid
- 2012: Por el torno y el sótano by Tirso de Molina at RESAD Madrid
- 2014: Légendes de la forêt viennoise by Ödön von Horváth at CNSAD Paris
- 2014: The Marriage of Figaro by Beaumarchais at CNSAD Paris
- 2017: The Crucible by Arthur Miller directed by Douglas Rintoul at Queen's Theatre London
- 2018: The Book of Disquiet by Fernando Pessoa directed by Rita Reis at Escher Theater Luxembourg
- 2019: Dealing with Clair by Martin Crimp directed by Anne Simon at Théâtre Capucins Luxembourg
- 2020-2022: Hedda Gabler by Henrik Ibsen directed by Marja-Leena Junker Grand Théâtre Luxembourg
- 2020-2022: Habiter le temps by Rasmus Lindberg directed by Michel Didym at Théâtre des Célestins, Lyon
- 2021: The lost beginning by Pedro Beja directed by Pedro Beja at Teatro Nacional São João Porto
- 2022: Medea by Euripides directed by Rafael Kohnen at Grand Théâtre Luxembourg
- 2023-2024: Menina do mar by Sophia de Mello Breyner directed by Rita Reis at Escher Theater
- 2023-2025: Café Terminus by Eugene O'Neil directed by Frank Hoffmann at Theatre National Luxembourg
- 2026: Les Voleurs d'Amour by Nicolas Steil directed by Frank Hoffmann at Theatre National Luxembourg
