= Canadian Screen Award for Best Supporting Performance in a Drama Film =

Annual Canadian film award

- Country: Canada
- Presented by: Academy of Canadian Cinema & Television
- First award: 2023
- Currently held by: Elle-Máijá Tailfeathers for Sweet Angel Baby (2025)
- Website: academy.ca/awards

The Canadian Screen Award for Best Supporting Performance in a Drama Film is an annual award, presented by the Academy of Canadian Cinema and Television as part of the Canadian Screen Awards program, to honour the best supporting performance in a drama film.

After the academy announced in August 2022 that it was discontinuing its former gendered awards for Best Supporting Actor and Best Supporting Actress, they presented only a single award for Best Supporting Performance in a Film at the 11th Canadian Screen Awards in 2023. The organization subsequently decided to increase the number of acting awards again, with the new awards separated by genre of film instead of performer gender; beginning with the 12th Canadian Screen Awards in 2024, distinct awards will now be presented for Best Supporting Performance in a Drama Film and Best Supporting Performance in a Comedy Film.

== 2020s ==
| Year | Actor | Film | Ref |
|---|---|---|---|
2023; 12th Canadian Screen Awards
| 2023; 12th Canadian Screen Awards | Chantal Thuy | Ru | |
| 2023; 12th Canadian Screen Awards | Laurie Babin | Red Rooms (Les Chambres rouges) | |
| 2023; 12th Canadian Screen Awards | Nelson Coronado | Richelieu | |
| 2023; 12th Canadian Screen Awards | Martin Dubreuil | Kanaval | |
| 2023; 12th Canadian Screen Awards | Frances Fisher | The King Tide | |
| 2023; 12th Canadian Screen Awards | Charles-Aubey Houde | The Dishwasher (Le Plongeur) | |
| 2023; 12th Canadian Screen Awards | Alexis Vincent-Wolfe | Slash/Back | |
| 2023; 12th Canadian Screen Awards | Aden Young | The King Tide | |
2024; 13th Canadian Screen Awards
| 2024; 13th Canadian Screen Awards | Jeremy Strong | The Apprentice | |
| 2024; 13th Canadian Screen Awards | Lise-Yolande Awashish | Atikamekw Suns (Soleils Atikamekw) | |
| 2024; 13th Canadian Screen Awards | Zahra Bentham | Village Keeper | |
| 2024; 13th Canadian Screen Awards | Lothaire Bluteau | The Thawing of Ice (La fonte des glaces) | |
| 2024; 13th Canadian Screen Awards | Micah Mensah-Jatoe | Village Keeper | |
| 2024; 13th Canadian Screen Awards | Tom Mercier | Darkest Miriam | |
| 2024; 13th Canadian Screen Awards | Sandra Oh | Can I Get a Witness? | |
| 2024; 13th Canadian Screen Awards | Maxine Simpson | Village Keeper | |
2025; 14th Canadian Screen Awards
| 2025; 14th Canadian Screen Awards | Elle-Máijá Tailfeathers | Sweet Angel Baby | |
| 2025; 14th Canadian Screen Awards | Paul Ahmarani | Who by Fire (Comme le feu) | |
| 2025; 14th Canadian Screen Awards | Aurélia Arandi-Longpré | Who by Fire (Comme le feu) | |
| 2025; 14th Canadian Screen Awards | Edik Beddoes | Blue Heron | |
| 2025; 14th Canadian Screen Awards | Monia Chokri | Where Souls Go (Où vont les âmes?) | |
| 2025; 14th Canadian Screen Awards | Micheline Lanctôt | Where Souls Go (Où vont les âmes?) | |
| 2025; 14th Canadian Screen Awards | Katie Mattatall | There, There | |
| 2025; 14th Canadian Screen Awards | Leah Panimera | Wrong Husband (Uiksaringitara) | |
