= Canadian Screen Award for Best Lead Performance in a Drama Film =

Annual Canadian film award

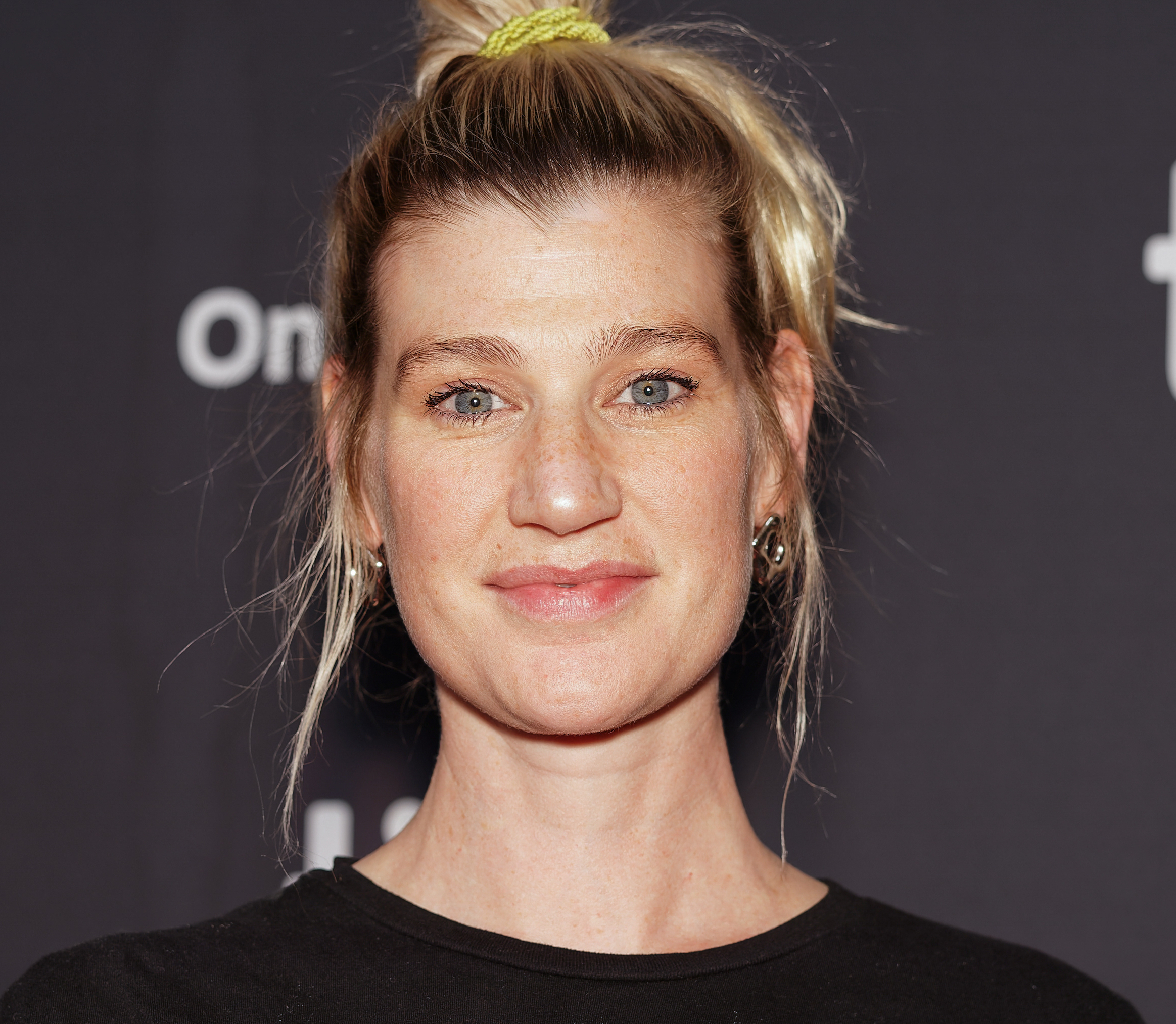
- 2025 winner: Grace Glowicki
- Country: Canada
- Presented by: Academy of Canadian Cinema & Television
- First award: 2023
- Currently held by: Grace Glowicki for Honey Bunch (2025)
- Website: academy.ca/awards

The Canadian Screen Award for Best Performance in a Drama Film is an annual award, presented by the Academy of Canadian Cinema and Television as part of the Canadian Screen Awards program, to honour the best leading performance in a drama film.

After the academy announced in August 2022 that it was discontinuing its former gendered awards for Best Actor and Best Actress, they presented only a single award for Best Lead Performance in a Film at the 11th Canadian Screen Awards in 2023. The organization subsequently decided to increase the number of acting awards again, with the new awards separated by genre of film instead of performer gender; beginning with the 12th Canadian Screen Awards in 2024, distinct awards will now be presented for Best Lead Performance in a Drama Film and Best Lead Performance in a Comedy Film.

== 2020s ==
| Year | Actor | Film | Ref |
|---|---|---|---|
2023; 12th Canadian Screen Awards
| 2023; 12th Canadian Screen Awards | Amrit Kaur | The Queen of My Dreams | |
| 2023; 12th Canadian Screen Awards | Ariane Castellanos | Richelieu | |
| 2023; 12th Canadian Screen Awards | Rayan Dieudonné | Kanaval | |
| 2023; 12th Canadian Screen Awards | Juliette Gariépy | Red Rooms (Les Chambres rouges) | |
| 2023; 12th Canadian Screen Awards | Mia Goth | Infinity Pool | |
| 2023; 12th Canadian Screen Awards | Oyin Oladejo | Orah | |
| 2023; 12th Canadian Screen Awards | Théodore Pellerin | Solo | |
| 2023; 12th Canadian Screen Awards | Alexander Skarsgård | Infinity Pool | |
2024; 13th Canadian Screen Awards
| 2024; 13th Canadian Screen Awards | Sebastian Stan | The Apprentice | |
| 2024; 13th Canadian Screen Awards | Oluniké Adeliyi | Village Keeper | |
| 2024; 13th Canadian Screen Awards | Christine Beaulieu | The Thawing of Ice (La fonte des glaces) | |
| 2024; 13th Canadian Screen Awards | Sean Dalton | Skeet | |
| 2024; 13th Canadian Screen Awards | Chaïmaa Zineddine Elidrissi | Gamma Rays (Les Rayons gammma) | |
| 2024; 13th Canadian Screen Awards | Britt Lower | Darkest Miriam | |
| 2024; 13th Canadian Screen Awards | Carrie-Anne Moss | Die Alone | |
| 2024; 13th Canadian Screen Awards | Oshim Ottawa | Atikamekw Suns (Soleils Atikamekw) | |
2025; 14th Canadian Screen Awards
| 2025; 14th Canadian Screen Awards | Grace Glowicki | Honey Bunch | |
| 2025; 14th Canadian Screen Awards | Milya Corbeil Gauvreau | Fanny | |
| 2025; 14th Canadian Screen Awards | Jasmin Geljo | Cat's Cry | |
| 2025; 14th Canadian Screen Awards | Marlene Jewell | There, There | |
| 2025; 14th Canadian Screen Awards | Theresia Kappianaq | Wrong Husband (Uiksaringitara) | |
| 2025; 14th Canadian Screen Awards | Nina Kiri | Out Standing | |
| 2025; 14th Canadian Screen Awards | Michaela Kurimsky | Sweet Angel Baby | |
| 2025; 14th Canadian Screen Awards | Noah Parker | Who by Fire (Comme le feu) | |
