= Mercenaire (2024 film) =

2024 Canadian short film directed by Pier-Philippe Chevigny

- Directed by: Pier-Philippe Chevigny
- Written by: Pier-Philippe Chevigny
- Produced by: Geneviève Gosselin-G.
- Starring: Marc-André Grondin; Sandrine Bisson; Émile Schneider; Jean-Guy Bouchard; Marc Beaupré
- Cinematography: Simran Dewan
- Edited by: Pier-Philippe Chevigny
- Production company: Le Foyer Films
- Distributed by: h264
- Release date: September 6, 2024 (TIFF)
- Running time: 15 minutes
- Country: Canada
- Language: French

Mercenaire is a Canadian short drama film, written and directed by Pier-Philippe Chevigny and released in 2024. The film stars Marc-André Grondin as David, an ex-convict who is struggling to readapt to life outside of prison with a job at a slaughterhouse.

The cast also includes Sandrine Bisson, Émile Schneider, Jean-Guy Bouchard and Marc Beaupré.

The film premiered at the 2024 Toronto International Film Festival. It was subsequently screened at the Festival International du Film Francophone de Namur, where it won the Prix Marion Hänsel. The film has also been selected at Clermont-Ferrand International Short Film Festival and won the Special Jury Award in the international competition. Mercenaire has been selected in multiple other film festivals such as Palm Springs International Film Festival, Busan International Short Film Festival, OFF Odense International Film Festival, Bogoshorts and Aesthetica Film Festival.

== Synopsis ==
Hired in a pig slaughterhouse through a social reintegration program, an ex-convict desperately tries to find another job while repressing his inner violence.

== Response ==
The film was named to TIFF's annual Canada's Top Ten list for 2024.

It won the Prix Iris for Best Live Action Short Film at the 27th Quebec Cinema Awards in 2025.
