= Enrique Miguel Baniqued =

Film producer

Enrique Miguel Baniqued is a Filipino Canadian film producer based in Toronto, Ontario, who was co-founder of the media production company Explorers. He is most noted as coproducer with Karen Chapman of the 2024 film Village Keeper, which was a Canadian Screen Award nominee for Best Motion Picture at the 13th Canadian Screen Awards in 2025.

He previously worked principally as a production assistant on short and feature films, with Village Keeper being his first credit as a producer. He and Chapman were also nominees for the Kevin Tierney Emerging Producer Award at the 2024 Indiescreen awards.
