= Zahra Bentham =

Canadian actress

Zahra Bentham is a Canadian actress. She is most noted for her performance as Tamika in the 2024 film Village Keeper, for which she received a Canadian Screen Award nomination for Best Supporting Performance in a Drama Film at the 13th Canadian Screen Awards in 2025.

She has also appeared in the television series Spinning Out and Self Made, and the films Guidance, White Lie and Morningside.
