= Maxine Simpson =

Maxine Simpson is a Canadian actress and retired nurse, who gave her debut performance as an actress in the 2024 film Village Keeper.

She received a Canadian Screen Award nomination for Best Supporting Performance in a Drama Film at the 13th Canadian Screen Awards in 2025.
