= Micah Mensah-Jatoe =

Micah Mensah-Jatoe is a Canadian actor. He is most noted for his performance as Tristin in the 2024 film Village Keeper, for which he received a Canadian Screen Award nomination for Best Supporting Performance in a Drama Film at the 13th Canadian Screen Awards in 2025.

He has also appeared in the television series Shelved and Slip, and the film Home Free.
