= Geneviève Gosselin-G. =

Canadian film producer

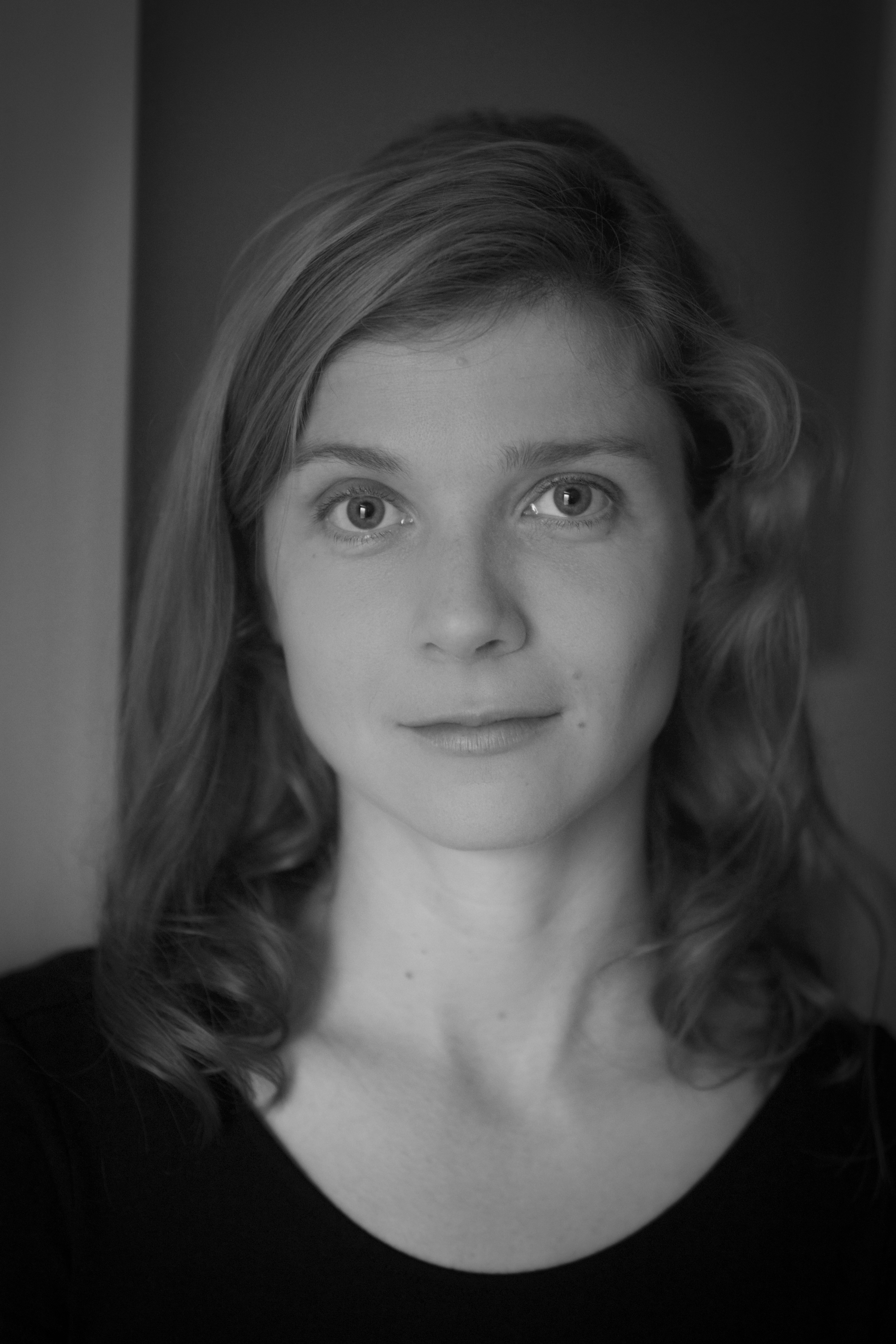

Geneviève Gosselin-G. is a Canadian film producer from Quebec, who was a founder of the film studio Le Foyer Films. She is most noted as producer of the 2023 film Richelieu, which was a Canadian Screen Award nominee for Best Picture at the 12th Canadian Screen Awards in 2024.

Her other credits have included the short films Rebel (Recrue), Joutel, Katshinau (Les Mains sales), Mercenaire and Elsewhere at Night (Ailleurs la nuit).
