= Rayan Dieudonné =

Rayan Dieudonné is a Haitian Canadian actor. He is most noted for his performance in the film Kanaval, for which he received a Canadian Screen Award nomination for Best Lead Performance in a Drama Film at the 12th Canadian Screen Awards in 2024.
