= Kanaval (film) =

2023 Canadian drama film

- Directed by: Henri Pardo
- Written by: Henri Pardo
- Produced by: Eric Idriss Kanago; Daniela Mujica; Adolf El Assal; Neigeme Glasgow-Maeda
- Starring: Rayan Dieudonné; Penande Estime; Martin Dubreuil
- Cinematography: Glauco Bermudez
- Edited by: Marc Recchia
- Production companies: Yzanakio; Wady Films
- Distributed by: Maison 4:3; Wady Media
- Release date: September 8, 2023 (TIFF)
- Running time: 112 minutes
- Countries: Canada; Luxembourg
- Language: French

Kanaval is a 2023 drama film directed by Henri Pardo. A co-production of companies from Canada and Luxembourg, the film centres on Rico (Rayan Dieudonné), a young boy who has emigrated with his mother Erzulie (Penande Estime) from their native Haiti to a small town in Quebec, where they live with childless older couple Albert (Martin Dubreuil) and Cécile (Claire Jacques).

The cast includes Hana Sofia Lopes, Jean Jean, Marc Assiniwi, Christian Cardin, Carol Beaudry, Rykko Bellemare and David Biron. It's produced by Éric Idriss-Kanago and Daniela Mujica (Canada) and Adolf El Assal and Neigeme Glasgow-Maeda (Luxembourg).

The film's production was first announced in 2020, when it received support from the Netflix/Canadian Film Centre Project Development Accelerator project. It entered production in April 2022, with shooting in both the Dominican Republic and Canada.

The film premiered in the Centrepiece program at the 2023 Toronto International Film Festival.

== Critical response ==
Courtney Small of That Shelf wrote that "Kanaval may not land all of the sprawling ideas it has flying in the air, but there is plenty to appreciate here. Anchored by Rayan Dieudonné’s moving wide-eyed performance, Pardo crafts an engaging film wrapped in mysticism and hope. Kanaval understands that the road that Rico and Erzuile find themselves on is one filled with uncertainty. However, the challenges are far more manageable when they are tackling them together."

The film was named to TIFF's annual Canada's Top Ten list for 2023.

== Awards ==
Award / Film Festival	Date of ceremony	Category	Recipient(s)	Result	Ref(s)
Toronto International Film Festival	2023	Best Canadian Film	Henri Pardo	Honored	
Toronto International Film Festival	2023	Amplify Voices Award for Best Film	Henri Pardo	Won	
Canadian Screen Awards	2024	Best Director	Henri Pardo	Nominated	
Canadian Screen Awards	2024	Best Lead Performance in a Drama Film	Rayan Dieudonné	Nominated	
Canadian Screen Awards	2024	Best Supporting Performance in a Drama Film	Martin Dubreuil	Nominated	
Canadian Screen Awards	2024	John Dunning Best First Feature	Henri Pardo	Nominated	
Prix Iris	December 8, 2024	Best Supporting Actor	Martin Dubreuil	Nominated	
Prix Iris	December 8, 2024	Best First Film	Henri Pardo	Nominated	
