= Marlene Jewell =

Canadian actress

Marlene Jewell is a Canadian actress. She is most noted for her performance in the 2025 film There, There, for which she received a Canadian Screen Award nomination for Best Lead Performance in a Drama Film at the 14th Canadian Screen Awards in 2026.

There, There was her first-ever acting performance.
