= Catherine Lutes =

Canadian cinematographer

Catherine Lutes is a Canadian cinematographer. She is most noted for her work on the film Disappearance at Clifton Hill, for which she received a Canadian Screen Award nomination for Best Cinematography at the 8th Canadian Screen Awards in 2020.

Her other credits have included the films The Armoire (2009), Molly Maxwell (2013), The People Garden (2016), Pyotr495 (2016), Mouthpiece (2018), Firecrackers (2018), Close to You (2023) and There, There (2024), as well as episodes of the television series Y The Last Man, Baroness von Sketch Show, You Me Her, Black Mirror, and Anne with an E.
