= Richelieu (2023 film) =

2023 Canadian drama film

- Directed by: Pier-Philippe Chevigny
- Written by: Pier-Philippe Chevigny
- Produced by: Geneviève Gosselin-G.
- Starring: Ariane Castellanos; Marc-André Grondin; Nelson Coronado
- Cinematography: Gabriel Brault-Tardif
- Edited by: Amélie Labrèche
- Production companies: Le Foyer Films; TS Productions; JPL Films
- Distributed by: Funfilm Distribution
- Release date: June 8, 2023 (Tribeca)
- Running time: 90 minutes
- Country: Canada
- Language: French

Richelieu (French: Richelieu (Québec), French: Dissidente (France)), also released as Temporaries in some territories, is a Canadian drama film, directed by Pier-Philippe Chevigny and released in 2023. The film stars Ariane Castellanos as Ariane, a woman who is hired as a Spanish-French translator at a food processing plant in Quebec that has a large staff of temporary migrant workers from Guatemala, but becomes an ally and advocate for the workers as she realizes the need to defend them from abuse and exploitation by owner Stéphane (Marc-André Grondin).

The cast also includes Nelson Coronado, Micheline Bernard, Ève Duranceau, Luis Oliva, Gerardo Miranda, Antonio Ortega, Émile Schneider and Marc Beaupré.

Chevigny's full-length directorial debut, the film entered production in 2021, under the working title Rive-Sud.

The film premiered on June 8, 2023, in competition at the Tribeca Film Festival. It had its Canadian premiere in July at the Fantasia Film Festival, and was commercially released in the fall.

== Awards ==
Award / Film Festival	Date of ceremony	Category	Recipient(s)	Result	Ref(s)
Canadian Screen Awards	2024	Best Picture	Geneviève Gosselin-G.	Nominated	
Canadian Screen Awards	2024	Best Lead Performance in a Drama Film	Ariane Castellanos	Nominated	
Canadian Screen Awards	2024	Best Supporting Performance in a Drama Film	Nelson Coronado	Nominated	
Canadian Screen Awards	2024	Best Cinematography	Gabriel Brault-Tardif	Nominated	
Canadian Screen Awards	2024	Best Casting in a Film	Ariane Castellanos, Victor Tremblay-Blouin	Nominated	
Canadian Screen Awards	2024	John Dunning Best First Feature	Pier-Philippe Chevigny	Nominated	
Prix Iris	December 8, 2024	Best Film	Geneviève Gosselin-G.	Nominated	
Prix Iris	December 8, 2024	Best Director	Pier-Philippe Chevigny	Nominated	
Prix Iris	December 8, 2024	Best Actress	Ariane Castellanos	Won	
Prix Iris	December 8, 2024	Best Supporting Actor	Marc-André Grondin	Won	
Prix Iris	December 8, 2024	Revelation of the Year	Ariane Castellanos	Won	
Prix Iris	December 8, 2024	Best Screenplay	Pier-Philippe Chevigny	Nominated	
Prix Iris	December 8, 2024	Best Editing	Amélie Labrèche	Nominated	
Prix Iris	December 8, 2024	Best Casting	Ariane Castellanos	Nominated	
Prix Iris	December 8, 2024	Most Successful Film Outside Quebec	Pier-Philippe Chevigny, Geneviève Gosselin-G.	Nominated	
Prix Iris	December 8, 2024	Best First Film	Pier-Philippe Chevigny	Nominated	
