= Nelson Coronado =

Canadian actor

Nelson Coronado is a Canadian actor based in Quebec. He is most noted for his performance in the film Richelieu, for which he received a Canadian Screen Award nomination for Best Supporting Performance in a Drama Film at the 12th Canadian Screen Awards in 2024.

Originally from Guatemala, he moved to Canada in 2010 to attend the Montreal School of Performing Art.
