= Rebel (2019 film) =

2019 Canadian short film

- French: Recrue
- Directed by: Pier-Philippe Chevigny
- Written by: Pier-Philippe Chevigny
- Produced by: Geneviève Gosselin-G.
- Starring: Édouard B. Larocque; Émile Schneider
- Cinematography: Gabriel Brault-Tardif
- Edited by: Pier-Philippe Chevigny
- Production company: Productions l'Unité Centrale
- Distributed by: H264 Distribution
- Release date: September 7, 2019 (TIFF)
- Running time: 15 minutes
- Country: Canada
- Language: French

Rebel (French: Recrue) is a Canadian short drama film, directed by Pier-Philippe Chevigny and released in 2019. The film centres on Alex (Edouard B. Larocque), a six-year-old boy whose father Dave (Émile Schneider) is a member of a far-right militia who are hunting refugees; taken out on the expedition, Alex is initially happy to play and have fun, but quickly changes his perspective and begins to rebel against his father after a chance encounter with a family hiding in the trees awakens him to what's actually going on.

The cast also includes Jean-Nicolas Verreault, Sasha Migliarese, Luc Boucher, Irlande Côté, Amir Sám Nakhjavani, Baharan BaniAhmadi, Denis Marchand, Hugolin Chevrette-Landesque, Ines Feghouli, Serge Pelletier, Juliette Maxyme Proulx, Ghislain LaRocque and Eliott Plamondon.

According to Chevigny, the film was inspired by a photograph of a young boy waving a flag at a La Meute demonstration. However, he also stated that he felt it was important for the film to not portray the militia members as straightforward villains, but as fundamentally normal people caught up in the emotion of the political climate around the migration crisis at the time the film was made.

The film premiered at the 2019 Toronto International Film Festival. It was screened at over 100 film festivals over the next two years, and won various awards; an award from the Tirana International Film Festival placed it in longlisted contention for the Academy Award for Best Live Action Short Film at the 93rd Academy Awards in 2021, although it did not make the final list of nominees.
