= London Bubble Theatre Company =

London Bubble Theatre Company is a community theatre and charity organization founded in 1972, focusing on all-ages acting classes and various outreach programs.

== Artistic Directors ==
London Bubble's Artistic Directors have been:

- Glen Walford 1972–1974
- Peter Coe 1975
- Glen Walford 1976–1979
- Bob Carlton 1979–1984
- Bob Eaton 1984–1986
- Peter Rowe 1986–1989
- Jonathan Petherbridge 1989–2020
- Marie Vickers 2020–present

== History ==
In 1972, due to the lack of theatre accessibility in London's outer boroughs, the Greater London Arts Association proposed the idea of a touring theatre to Glen Walford. Walford proposed the use of a tent that would be transferred between parks around London. Later that year, the London Bubble was established and the troupe toured around parks in 22 London boroughs.

The Company originated Return to the Forbidden Planet for a production in a tent.

== Awards ==
2017 - Arts & Culture London Youth Awards

2019 - SLCN Innovation of The Year Shine a Light Awards

2022 - Best Charity or Social Enterprise Southwark Business Excellence Awards
