= Lise-Yolande Awashish =

Lise-Yolande Awashish is an Atikamekw actress from Obedjiwan, Quebec. She is most noted for her performance as Lucie Petiquay in the film Atikamekw Suns (Soleils Atikamekw), for which she received a Canadian Screen Award nomination for Best Supporting Actress in a Drama Film at the 13th Canadian Screen Awards in 2025.
