= Bob Carlton =

English theatre director and writer (1950–2018)

Bob Carlton (23 June 1950 – 18 January 2018) was an English theatre director and writer. He is best known for creating and directing the jukebox musical Return to the Forbidden Planet, which won the Laurence Olivier Award for Best New Musical in both 1989 and 1990 and has been produced in many different countries around the world.

Carlton's hit musical combined rock'n'roll songs with some dialogue found in the works of William Shakespeare – primarily The Tempest – plus original action and dialogue adapting the plot and characters from Forbidden Planet, the 1956 science fiction film that play inspired. He also employed parts of this formula in 1984 with From A Jack To A King, a similar jukebox musical adaptation of Macbeth with dialogue written in iambic pentameter.

Carlton wrote several other plays and directed episodes of the television soap operas Brookside and Emmerdale Farm and the children's series Streetwise.

He was born in Coventry and attended King Henry VIII School, read drama at the University of Hull and, after graduation, won an Arts Council Trainee Director's Bursary to the Belgrade Theatre in his hometown of Coventry. He was later associate director at the Dukes Playhouse, Lancaster and York Theatre Royal before becoming artistic director of the London Bubble Theatre Company, a post he held from 1979 until 1983. It was during this time that he created and first staged Return to the Forbidden Planet.

From 1997 to 2014 he was the artistic director of the Queen's Theatre, Hornchurch. On 17 September 2014, it was announced that he was stepping down from the position to focus on his writing.

It was announced on 19 January 2018 that he had died from cancer the previous day.
