= Katie Mattatall =

Canadian actress

Katie Mattatall is a Canadian actress. She is most noted for her performance in the 2025 film There, There, for which she received a Canadian Screen Award nomination for Best Supporting Performance in a Drama Film at the 14th Canadian Screen Awards in 2026.
