= There, There (film) =

2024 Canadian drama film directed by Heather Young

- Theatrical release poster
- Directed by: Heather Young
- Written by: Heather Young
- Produced by: Britt Kerr; Martha Cooley; Heather Young
- Starring: Marlene Jewell; Katie Mattatall
- Cinematography: Catherine Lutes
- Edited by: Heather Young
- Production companies: Houseplant Films; Brass Door Productions
- Release date: September 29, 2024 (VIFF)
- Running time: 106 minutes
- Country: Canada
- Language: English

There, There is a Canadian drama film written, directed, and edited by Heather Young and released in 2024. Shot with a static camera, the film centres on the relationship between Ruth (Marlene Jewell), an elderly woman afflicted with early stage dementia, and Shannon (Katie Mattatall), her young caretaker who is struggling with having been abandoned by her boyfriend while she was pregnant with their child.

The film received a production grant from Telefilm Canada in 2022.

The film premiered at the 2024 Vancouver International Film Festival, and was screened in the National Competition at the 2024 Festival du nouveau cinéma, where it received a Special Jury Mention.

The film opened commercially on December 5, 2025.

== Synopsis ==
There, There tells the parallel stories of Ruth, an elderly woman with dementia obsessed with feeding the neighbourhood birds, and Shannon, her young homecare worker who is pregnant and has been deserted by the baby's father. The two women find comfort in one another at these very different stages in their lives.

== Awards ==
| Award | Year | Category | Work | Result | Ref |
|---|---|---|---|---|---|
| Canadian Screen Awards | 2026 | Best Direction | Heather Young | Nominated | |
| Canadian Screen Awards | 2026 | Best Lead Performance in a Drama Film | Marlene Jewell | Nominated | |
| Canadian Screen Awards | 2026 | Best Supporting Performance in a Drama Film | Katie Mattatall | Nominated | |
| Canadian Screen Awards | 2026 | Best Cinematography | Catherine Lutes | Nominated | |
