= Marianne Métivier =

Canadian film director

Marianne Métivier is a Canadian film director and screenwriter from Montreal, Quebec, whose debut feature film Elsewhere at Night (Ailleurs la nuit) released in 2025.

Of québécoise and Filipina descent, she studied film at the Université du Québec à Montréal. She directed a number of short films in the 2010s; her most noted short film, She Who Wears the Rain (Celle qui porte la pluie), was screened at numerous Canadian and international film festivals in 2019 and 2020, and was selected at the Berlinale Shorts Competition 2020.

She entered production on Elsewhere at Night in 2024, originally under the working title The Splendour of Life (Une splendeur de vivre). The film is slated to premiere in the National Competition at the 2025 Festival du nouveau cinéma.
