= Village Keeper =

- Film Poster
- Directed by: Karen Chapman
- Screenplay by: Karen Chapman
- Produced by: Enrique Miguel Baniqued; Karen Chapman
- Starring: Oluniké Adeliyi; Maxine Simpson; Zahra Bentham; Micah Mensah-Jatoe
- Cinematography: Jordan Oram
- Edited by: Christopher Minns; Xi Feng; Jordan Hayles
- Music by: Dalton Tennant
- Production company: Smallaxx Motion Pictures
- Distributed by: Levelfilm
- Release date: September 11, 2024 (TIFF)
- Running time: 83 minutes
- Country: Canada
- Language: English

Village Keeper is a Canadian drama film directed by Karen Chapman, and released in 2024. The film stars Oluniké Adeliyi as Jean, a Black Canadian widow living in the Lawrence Heights community of Toronto, where she tries to protect her children Tamika (Zahra Bentham) and Tristin (Micah Mensah-Jatoe) from neighbourhood violence.

The cast also includes Maxine Simpson as Jean's mother, as well as Oyin Oladejo, d'bi.young anitafrika, Ethan Burnett, Shiloh O'Reilly, Noah Zulfikar, Ricardo Betancourt, L.A. Sweeney, Mark Sparks, Gordon Fulton, Zara McLean, Jael Obasi and Mekeylah Minott in supporting roles.

Chapman's feature directorial debut, it entered production in summer 2023, in Toronto.

The film premiered in the Discovery program at the 2024 Toronto International Film Festival.

== Awards ==
Award	Date of ceremony	Category	Recipient(s)	Result	Ref.
Directors Guild of Canada	2024	Best Direction in a Feature Film	Karen Chapman	Nominated	
Canadian Screen Awards	2025	Best Motion Picture	Enrique Miguel Baniqued, Karen Chapman	Nominated	
Canadian Screen Awards	2025	Best Lead Performance in a Drama Film	Oluniké Adeliyi	Nominated	
Canadian Screen Awards	2025	Best Supporting Performance in a Drama Film	Zahra Bentham	Nominated	
Canadian Screen Awards	2025	Best Supporting Performance in a Drama Film	Micah Mensah-Jatoe	Nominated	
Canadian Screen Awards	2025	Best Supporting Performance in a Drama Film	Maxine Simpson	Nominated	
Canadian Screen Awards	2025	Best Original Screenplay	Karen Chapman	Nominated	
Canadian Screen Awards	2025	John Dunning Best First Feature	Karen Chapman	Won	
