= Oshim Ottawa =

Canadian actor and musician (1997–2026)

Oshim Ottawa

Oshim Ottawa (1997 – June 24, 2026) was a Canadian actor and musician from Manawan, Quebec. He is most noted for his performance as Philippe Flamand in the 2023 film Atikamekw Suns (Soleils Atikamekw), for which he received a Canadian Screen Award nomination for Best Lead Performance in a Drama Film at the 13th Canadian Screen Awards in 2025.

As a musician he was associated with Red Rockerz, a band who blend indigenous and electronic music.

Ottawa died on June 24, 2026, at the age of 29.
