= Pier-Philippe Chevigny =

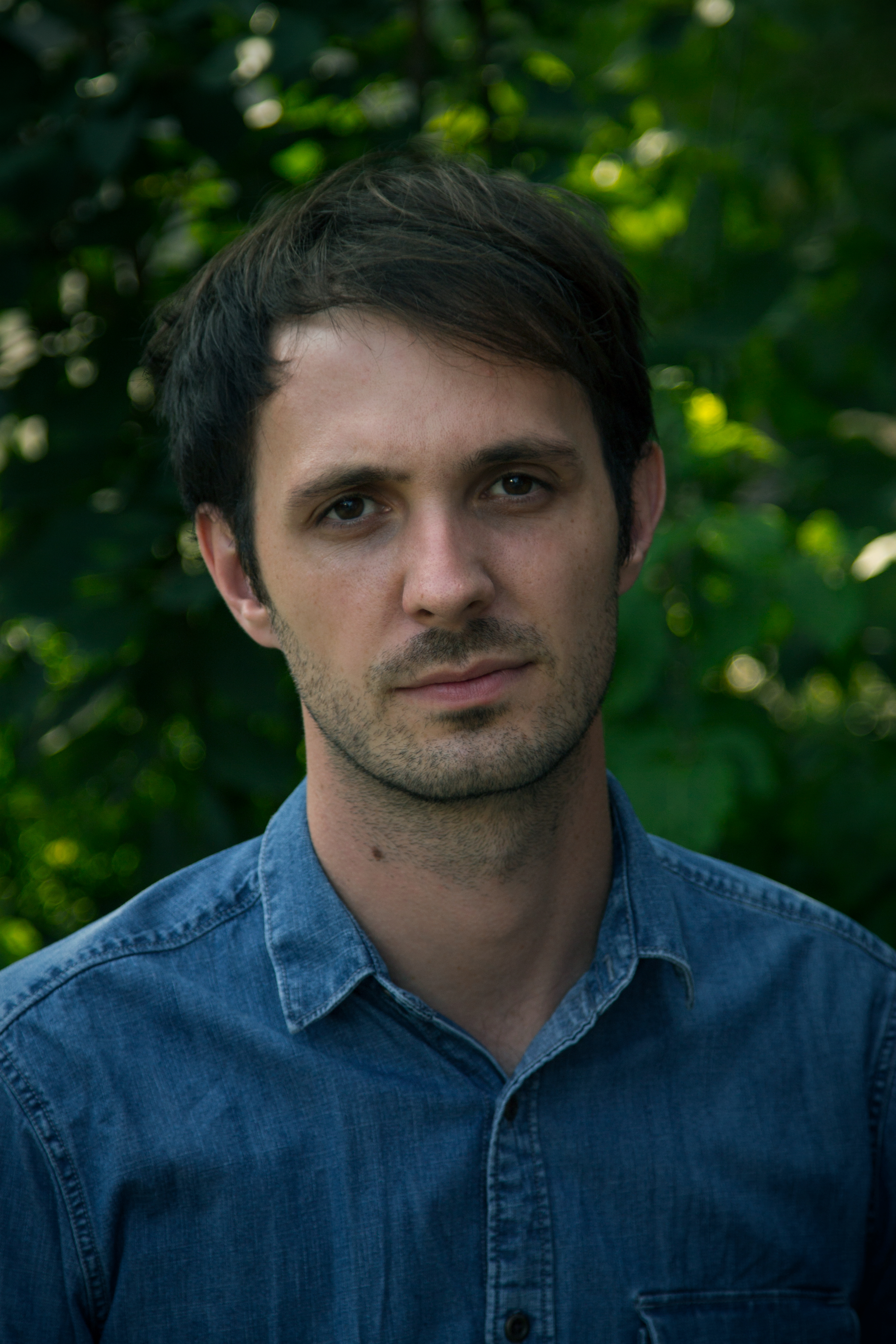
- Born: 1988 (age 37–38); Contrecœur, Quebec, Canada
- Occupations: film director, screenwriter
- Years active: 2009–present

Pier-Philippe Chevigny (born 1988) is a Canadian film director and screenwriter from Quebec, most noted for his 2019 short film Rebel (Recrue), and his 2023 feature debut Richelieu.

Originally from Contrecœur, Quebec, he is a graduate of the film school at the Université de Montréal. He made a number of short films before breaking through with Rebel, which premiered at the 2019 Toronto International Film Festival.

In 2021 he entered production on Richelieu. The film subsequently had its world premiere in the International Competition of the 2023 Tribeca Film Festival.

== Filmography ==
- Carré de sable - 2011
- Les Jours qui suivront - 2012
- La Résistance d'Hippocrate - 2013
- La Gardienne - 2013
- Tala - 2013
- The Visit (La Visite) - 2015
- Vétérane - 2017
- Hamecon - 2019
- Rebel (Recrue) - 2019
- Richelieu - 2023
- Mercenaire - 2024
- Arsenal - in development
