= Alexis Vincent-Wolfe =

Alexis Vincent-Wolfe is an Inuk actress from Iqaluit, Nunavut, Canada. She is most noted for her performance in the film Slash/Back, for which she received a Canadian Screen Award nomination for Best Supporting Performance in a Drama Film at the 12th Canadian Screen Awards in 2024.
