= Gabriel Brault-Tardif =

Canadian cinematographer

Gabriel Brault-Tardif is a Canadian cinematographer from Quebec. He is most noted for his work on the 2023 film Richelieu, for which he received a Canadian Screen Award nomination for Best Cinematography at the 12th Canadian Screen Awards in 2024.

His other credits have included the films Rebel (Recrue) and Gaby's Hills (Gaby les collines).
