= Elsewhere at Night =

- French: Ailleurs la nuit
- Directed by: Marianne Métivier
- Screenplay by: Marianne Métivier
- Produced by: Geneviève Gosselin-G.
- Starring: Camille Rutherford; Garance Marillier; Victor Andrés Trelles Turgeon; Émile Schneider; Amaryllis Tremblay
- Cinematography: Ariel Méthot
- Edited by: Myriam Magassouba
- Production companies: Altamar Films; Le Foyer Films; FUSEE
- Distributed by: h264 Distribution
- Release date: October 16, 2025 (FNC)
- Running time: 106 minutes
- Countries: Canada; Philippines
- Languages: French; English; Filipino

Elsewhere at Night (French: Ailleurs la nuit) is a 2025 drama film, directed by Marianne Métivier and released in 2025. The film centres on the interrelated stories of a group of women whose lives are changed by an impactful personal encounter.

== Synopsis ==
A scorching summer stretches across the countryside and the city. In a lush landscape, Marie, a sound artist in search of inspiration, begins to question her relationship. The arrival of Noée, a young traveler, disrupts her routine and that of Yan, a solitary farmer next door. In the city, Eva, newly arrived from the Philippines, walks sleepless nights, caught between homes, while Jeanne, a master's student, contemplates walking away from everything. Between moments of doubt and brief connections, their worlds echo one another.

== Cast ==
- Camille Rutherford
- Garance Marillier
- Victor Andrés Trelles Turgeon
- Émile Schneider
- Amaryllis Tremblay
- Kyrie Samodio
- Sue Prado
- Enchong Dee

== Production ==
The film entered production in 2024, initially under the working title The Splendour of Life (Une Splendeur de vivre). The film was shot in both Quebec and the Philippines.

== Release ==
The film premiered in the National Competition at the 2025 Festival du nouveau cinéma.

It had its international premiere at the Torino Film Festival in November 2025, and was released commercially in Canada on February 13, 2026.
