= Return to the Forbidden Planet =

Musical

- Music: Various Artists
- Lyrics: Various Artists
- Book: Bob Carlton
- Basis: The Tempest by William Shakespeare; 1956 film Forbidden Planet written by: Cyril Hume, Irving Block and Allen Adler
- Productions: 1983 London; 1989 West End; 1991 Off-Broadway; 2000/01 The English Theatre Frankfurt; 2009 St. Louis, MO
- Awards: Laurence Olivier Award for Best New Musical 1989 & 1990

Return to the Forbidden Planet is a jukebox musical by Bob Carlton based on the 1956 science fiction film Forbidden Planet, which, in turn, is loosely based on Shakespeare's play The Tempest. The show features a score of 1950s and 1960s rock and roll classics and dialogue largely adapted from well-known passages from Shakespeare.

Often billed as "Shakespeare's forgotten rock and roll masterpiece", Return to the Forbidden Planet has been performed all over the world since its premiere in London in the 1980s. It won the Olivier Award for Best New Musical for both 1989 and 1990.

Conceived for a cast of actor-musicians, the space ship sets conceals keyboards and drums. The campy sci-fi setting consists of silvered space suits and the robot, Ariel, is performed by an actor on roller skates, with a costume reminiscent of the original movie's Robby the Robot. There is a part for narrator (known as "the newsreader") on pre-recorded video, who has been performed by celebrities including Patrick Moore, Brian May, Richard O'Brien and Neil deGrasse Tyson.

== Plot ==
=== Act 1 ===
The bosun of the starship Albatross welcomes the audience as passengers aboard a routine survey flight, departing momentarily under the command of Captain Tempest. After takeoff, Captain Tempest converses with the ship's new Science Officer, who is a woman, and they argue about the importance of men and women on earth. During their argument, the ship gets caught in a meteor shower. The Science Officer suggests that they use the shuttle craft and abandon ship, but Captain Tempest insists on flying through the storm. During the confusion, the Science Officer escapes the ship via shuttle craft. Their spaceship is drawn mysteriously to the planet D'Illyria where the crew meet mad scientist Doctor Prospero, who has been marooned on the planet since his wife and science partner Gloria sent him and their daughter Miranda into space. Doctor Prospero offers to help repair the broken starship and he, his daughter, and their robot Ariel come aboard. The ship's cook, Cookie, is instantly taken by Miranda's beauty and falls in love with her, a love he thinks she returns. In fact she has fallen in love with Captain Tempest, against the will of her father. During discussions about locating the missing Science Officer, Ariel reveals information about Doctor Prospero's new formula 'X Factor’, which can enhance the brain and mind. After an argument with his daughter over her love for the captain, Doctor Prospero takes the draught of 'X Factor'. Soon afterwards, the ship is attacked by a foul monster, but during the attack it is revealed that Ariel is in the airlock with the missing Science Officer. To save them both, Captain Tempest orders the airlock opened, which allows the monster to gain access to the ship. During the confusion of the attack it is revealed that the Science Officer is Doctor Prospero's wife Gloria, who is then taken by the monster, as its tentacles attack the rest of the ship.

=== Act 2 ===
The story continues with the attack unfolding again, but this time Gloria isn't kidnapped by the monster, and Ariel the robot is able to attack the monster to make it retreat. After the attack, more is revealed about Doctor Prospero and Gloria's past. Captain Tempest puts Gloria under ship arrest for her crimes against her husband. She forms a quick alliance with Cookie, whom she persuades to release her and help steal the recipe for Doctor Prospero's 'X Factor' in exchange for helping him win over Miranda's heart. Gloria talks to Cookie, as Bosun, the ship's First Mate, talks to Captain Tempest about how to gain the love of Miranda. When the monster returns, it is revealed that it is created by Doctor Prospero's mind due to his having taken the 'X Factor'. Gloria tells Doctor Prospero that what she did to him was so that he could keep himself and their daughter safe from the 'X Factor'. Doctor Prospero has no choice but to leave the ship and sacrifice himself to save the others. Once Doctor Prospero has left, it is then revealed that D'Illyria is nothing other than a figment of Doctor Prospero's imagination, as it starts to destroy itself once the doctor has died. The ship escapes. Once again in space Gloria blesses the union of Miranda and Captain Tempest, and Cookie is pardoned for his behaviour towards Miranda and Captain Tempest. The show ends with the crew safe and well with their Science Officer back and Captain Tempest with a new bride.

== Productions ==
=== United Kingdom ===
Return to the Forbidden Planet was first performed by the Bubble Theatre Company in a tented theatre in Blackheath, London, on 23 May 1983. Following revisions to the material, versions of the show followed at the Everyman Theatre, Liverpool and the Tricycle Theatre, London, before opening, on 18 September 1989 at the Cambridge Theatre in London's West End. The London production won the Olivier Award for Best New Musical for both 1989 and 1990. A West End cast album was released in 1990 by Virgin Records.

The show was revived for touring productions in the United Kingdom in 1999, 2001 and 2002, with Patrick Moore reprising his pre-recorded role as the newsreader. A new production toured the UK in 2006 with Brian May as the newsreader.

In August and September 2012, a revival of Return to the Forbidden Planet played the Queen's Theatre, Hornchurch. The production was directed by the show's creator, Bob Carlton, who was then the theatre's artistic director. Richard O'Brien appeared as the newsreader. The production's musical supervisor was Julian Littman, the musical director was Greg Last, and the choreographer was Frido Ruth. In November 2014, the production returned to the Queen's Theatre for the a 25th anniversary prior to a UK tour.

=== Australia ===
When the musical opened in Sydney, Australia, the beginning of a national tour, the newsreader was played by Clive "Robbo" Robertson, who performed a futuristic parody of his own late-night TV news show, "Newsworld". An Australian cast album was released in 1991 by ATA Records.

=== North America ===
On September 27, 1991, Return to the Forbidden Planet opened Off-Broadway at the Variety Arts Theatre, the first theatrical production in a former nickelodeon. The cast included Julee Cruise, known to audiences from her role in Twin Peaks. The newsreader was James Doohan, known for his role as "Scotty" in Star Trek. It was nominated for two Outer Critics Circle Awards, but played to mixed reviews from critics and closed, after 243 performances, on April 26, 1992.

In Los Angeles, the ARK Theatre Company mounted a production of the musical in 2004, under the direction of Vanessa Claire Smith.

New Line Theatre in St. Louis, MO staged the show in March 2009. Critic Paul Friswold of The Riverfront Times wrote about the production, “Bob Carlton's whimsical take on The Tempest as refracted through a 1950s sci-fi prism features a galaxy's worth of fantastic rock & roll songs, punning wordplays on snippets of Shakespearean monologues and intentionally ‘Pigs in Space’ costuming. But this is no parlor trick of a musical; there's a rich vein of Shakespeare's favorite ingredient — the wondrous depths of the human heart — that elevates the show from cunning stunt to artful meditation on the destructive nature of power and the redemptive power of love.”

In 2019, Red Bull Theater mounted a one-night-only concert performance at Symphony Space in New York, benefitting the theater's upcoming productions. The production featured Tony Award nominees Steven Boyer, Robert Cuccioli, Patrick Page, Mary Testa, Kim Exum, Kevin R. Free, Jo Lampert, Amy Spanger, Charlotte Maltby, Jeffrey Eugene Johnson, Ben Jones and Salisha Thomas, with direction by Gabriel Barre and Music Direction by Greg Pliska. Astrophysicist Neil Degrasse Tyson also made a special appearance.

== Musical numbers ==
The score has varied since the show was first performed. This list reflects the show as it is currently licensed for performance.

Act 1

- "Wipe Out" - Orchestra
- "Albatross" - Orchestra
- "It's a Man's Man's Man's World" - Gloria and Tempest
- "Great Balls of Fire" - Company
- "Don't Let Me Be Misunderstood" - Prospero
- "Theme from 'Close Encounters of the Third Kind'" - Orchestra
- "Good Vibrations"- Ariel, Tempest, Miranda and Company
- "Yeh, Yeh" (replaced "The Shoop Shoop Song (It's in His Kiss)" in earlier versions of the show) - Cookie and Bosun
- "Ain’t Gonna Wash For a Week" - Cookie
- "I'm Gonna Change the World" - Tempest, Prospero and Ariel
- "Teenager in Love" - Miranda
- "Young Girl" - Tempest, Miranda and Cookie
- "She's Not There" - Cookie
- "Shakin' All Over" (replaced "All Shook Up") - Tempest, Prospero and Miranda
- "Gloria" - Company
Act 2
- "5-4-3-2-1" / "Gloria" - Company
- "Who's Sorry Now?" - Ariel
- "Tell Him" (as "Tell Her") / "Gimme Some Lovin' " - Gloria, Bosun, Cookie, Navigation Officer, Tempest and Company
- "Oh, Pretty Woman"
- "War Paint"
- "Robot Man" (Connie Francis version)
- "Shake, Rattle and Roll"
- "Go Now"
- "Only the Lonely"
- "The Young Ones"
- "Born To Be Wild" (replaced "We Gotta Get out of This Place")
- "Wipe Out (Reprise)"
- "Mr. Spaceman"
- "I Can't Turn You Loose" / "Monster Mash"
- "Great Balls of Fire (Reprise)"

Encore songs (variously)

- "I Heard It Through the Grapevine"
- "Johnny B. Goode"
- "It's So Easy!"
- "Join Together" and "When Will I Be Loved" (performed at the beginning of the Basingstoke run only)
- "Rockin' Around the Christmas Tree"
- "Telstar"

== Casts ==
Character	Production		
Character	Blackheath, 1983	West End, 1989	Queen's Theatre, 2012
Captain Tempest	John Ashby	John Ashby	Sean Needham
Doctor Prospero	Colin Wakefield	Christian Roberts	James Earl Adair
Ariel the Robot	Nigel Nevinson	Kraig Thornber	Fredrick Ruth (Frido Ruth)
Cookie	Mathew Devitt	Mathew Devitt	Mark Newnham
Science Officer	Nicky Furre	Nicky Furre	Jane Milligan
Bosun	Alan Barker	Anthony Hunt	Simon Jessop
Navigation Officer	Kate Edgar	Kate Edgar	Greg Last
Miranda	Annie Miles	Allison Harding	Natasha Moore
Newsreader	Magnus Pike	Patrick Moore	Richard O'Brien

== Awards and nominations ==
=== Original London production ===
Year	Award	Category	Nominee	Result
1989	Laurence Olivier Award	Best New Musical		Won
1989	Laurence Olivier Award	Best Actor in a Musical	Matthew Devitt	Nominated
