= Slash/Back =

- Poster
- Directed by: Nyla Innuksuk
- Screenplay by: Nyla Innuksuk; Ryan Cavan
- Produced by: Dan Bekerman; Christopher Yurkovich; Alex Ordanis; Nyla Innuksuk; Stacey Aglok Macdonald; Alethea Arnaquq-Baril; Ethan Lazar
- Starring: Tasiana Shirley; Alexis Vincent-Wolfe; Nalajoss Ellsworth; Chelsea Prusky
- Cinematography: Guy Godfree
- Edited by: Simone Smith
- Production companies: Mixtape VR; Red Marrow Media; Scythia Films; Stellar Citizens
- Distributed by: Mongrel Media; Sierra/Affinity
- Release date: 13 March 2022 (SXSW)
- Running time: 86 minutes
- Country: Canada

Slash/Back is a 2022 Canadian Inuit science fiction film directed by Nyla Innuksuk in her feature debut from a screenplay by Innuksuk and Ryan Cavan. It premiered at the 2022 South by Southwest Film Festival in Texas.

== Plot ==
Set in Pangnirtung, Nunavut, a remote community, this story follows four teenage girls. We are introduced to them as they are living a typical boring day. The girls decide to take a boat to the land, where they have always been warned never to go without an adult. Maika decides to bring her dad’s rifle.

On the land, the girls see a strange polar bear. Maika’s little sister shows up and the bear attacks her. The bear is shot and the girls run back to the boat and head home.

Uki goes back to investigate and discovers an alien artifact. She sees the bear and an elk dragging a body to the artifact that begins to drain the blood.

The police officer is later attacked by the polar bear and then finds Uki when he becomes a Skin. The girls escape and hide in a shipping container. Uki, Maika, and Jesse decide to find the two Skins and take them out after being unable to get ahold of their parents who are at a Social Dance.

After surviving the attack by the cop Skin, the girls decide Uki is to be bait to attack the fisherman Skin. Thomassie arrives with his Honda four wheeler and the girls use this to their advantage. When the fisherman Skin arrives, Thomassie captures the Skin and drives off but the Skin is able to get free. It chases Uki and attacks her, managing to attach and suck blood out of her.

Maika and Jesse follow the Skin’s blood trail and see it has gone to Maika’s house. The girls go inside where the Skin attacks Maika’s father. Maika gets knocked out and flashes back to when her dad taught her about hunting. She awakens and helps set her father free while slicing the throat of the Skin with a blade. A sharp light beam emits from the alien artifact and shoots into the sky. The Skin dries out and seems to die.

The girls see the light and a space craft flies out of it. The girls celebrate their victory.

A month later, things returned to normal except news reporters descending on the community. When asked, Maika says she’s a hunter. Uki talked to the reporters and the movie ends.

== Cast ==
- Tasiana Shirley as Maika
- Alexis Vincent-Wolfe as Jesse
- Nalajoss Ellsworth as Uki
- Chelsea Prusky as Leena
- Frankie Vincent-Wolfe as Aju
- Rory Anawak as Thomassie
- Kristian Bruun as Tony Konk
- Shaun Benson as Officer Lefebvre

== Production ==
The concept for Slash/Back was first presented at the 2018 Frontières Co-Pro Market in Montréal, followed by the 2019 Frontières Finance and Packaging Forum in Helsinki and then the Marché du Film at the Cannes Film Festival, after which point Sierra/Affinity boarded the project as an international distributor.

Principal photography took place on location on Baffin Island in summer 2019. It became the first production to film in the Inuit hamlet of Pangnirtung. The area was already experiencing a housing shortage so production flew in fifty beds and set up accommodation for the crews in two local schools. Acting workshops were set up to find local girls to star in the film.

== Release ==
A first look still was revealed in March 2021.

Slash/Back premiered at the 2022 South by Southwest Festival in Texas. In Canada, it was the opening night film at the TIFF Next Wave Film Festival.

On October 21, 2022, it was released in selected theatres and to video on demand service Vudu.

== Critical response ==
On the review aggregator website Rotten Tomatoes, the film received a 92% approval rating, based on 49 reviews, with an average rating of 6.8/10. The website's consensus reads, "An impressive feature debut for director/co-writer Nyla Innuksuk, Slash/Back puts a refreshing spin on the standard alien invasion thriller." On Metacritic, the film has a score of 67 out of 100, based on reviews from 11 critics, indicating "generally favorable reviews".

Barry Hertz of The Globe and Mail wrote that "the moments between can be rough, the result of a script whose last two acts can't reach the heights of its enticing conceit, a choppy sense of pacing that speeds up when it should slow down and vice versa, an amateur cast whose rawness is at odds with the story that they are enlisted with telling, and a no-frills visual-effects budget that robs the film of its central creature-feature thrills. There is, though, so much promise in every chilly inch of Innuksuk's vision, starting with her film’s firm sense of place – the director grew up in Nunavut, dreaming of darkness even when sunlight was 24/7 – and extending to how the director continues horror’s long tradition of sneaking in heavy themes that audiences might otherwise not so readily shoulder."

== Awards ==
The film was shortlisted for the Directors Guild of Canada's 2022 Jean-Marc Vallée DGC Discovery Award.
