= Douglas Rintoul =

British theatre director and playwright

Douglas Rintoul is a British theatre director and playwright.

He is currently the Chief Executive/Artistic Director of the New Wolsey Theatre in Ipswich. He was the artistic director of The Queen's Theatre, Hornchurch (2015–2022), he founded and ran the national touring company Transport Theatre (2017) and was a longstanding associate of Complicité.

Douglas was born in Bury St. Edmunds and grew up in Canterbury and Colchester. He read Drama & Theatre Arts at The University of Birmingham.

He won a Regional Theatre Young Director Scheme bursary to train at Salisbury Playhouse, was selected for the Royal National Theatre Studio Young Director Programme and won an Esmeé Fairbairn Regional Theatre Initiative Award. During his tenure as artistic director of the Queen's Theatre Hornchurch the organisation won the London Theatre of the Year Stage Award 2020. He was listed in The Stage's 100 most influential people working in the theatre and performing arts industry.

His script for his theatre production Elegy won a Royal National Theatre Foundation Playwright's Award. Hise productions have been nominated for 27 Offies.
