= Karen Chapman (director) =

Canadian film and television director

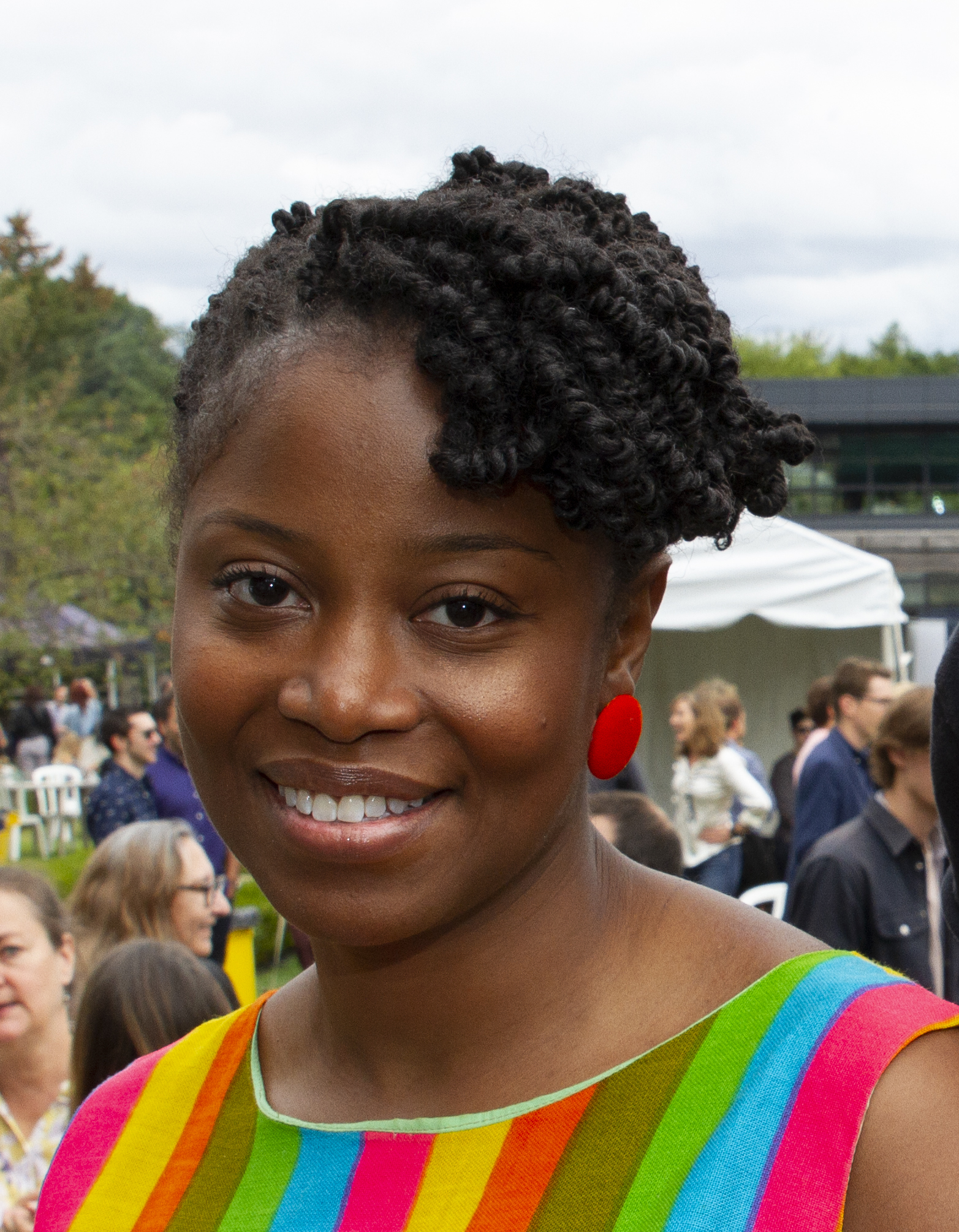
- Education: Emily Carr University of Art and Design; Canadian Film Centre
- Years active: 2000s–present
- Children: 2

Karen Chapman is a Canadian film and television director, whose debut feature film Village Keeper premiered at the 2024 Toronto International Film Festival.

A graduate of Emily Carr University of Art and Design and the Canadian Film Centre, she made a number of short films in her early career, prior to her screenplay treatment for Village Keeper being selected for Telefilm Canada's Talent to Watch program for emerging filmmakers in 2018.

In 2019 her short virtual reality documentary They Should Be Flowers premiered at the Hot Docs Canadian International Documentary Festival, and her narrative short film Measure premiered at the 2019 Toronto International Film Festival. They Should Be Flowers received a Canadian Screen Award nomination for Best Immersive Experience, Non-Fiction at the 8th Canadian Screen Awards in 2020.

She subsequently directed episodes of the television series Odd Squad, Holly Hobbie and Black Life: Untold Stories, and another short film titled Quiet Minds Silent Streets, before entering production on Village Keeper in 2023.

She received a nomination for the DGC Award for Best Direction in a Feature Film for Village Keeper. At the 13th Canadian Screen Awards in 2025, the film won the John Dunning Best First Feature Award.

== Filmography ==
- Beauty Lies - 2008
- Stain - 2013
- Walk Good - 2016
- Lessons Injustice - 2017
- Measure - 2019
- They Should Be Flowers - 2019
- Quiet Minds Silent Streets - 2022
- Village Keeper - 2024

=== Television ===
- Odd Squad - 2021
- Holly Hobbie - 2022
- Black Life: Untold Stories - 2023
