= Queen's Theatre, Hornchurch =

Theatre in East London

Queen's Theatre
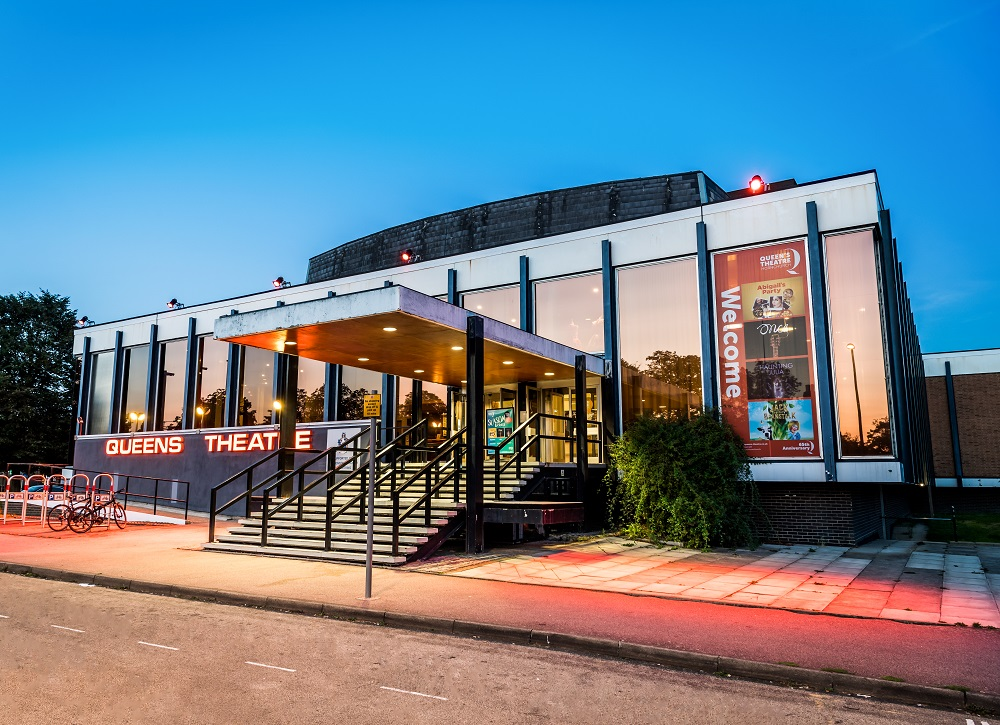
- Theatre exterior
- Interactive map of Queen's Theatre
- Address: Billet Lane; Hornchurch; England
- Location: London, UK
- Coordinates: 51.5652°N 0.2195°E
- Owner: Havering Council
- Operator: Havering Theatre Trust
- Seating type: Single tier raked
- Capacity: 507
- Type: Theatre
- Public transit: Emerson Park; Hornchurch

Construction
- Opened: 21 September 1953
- Rebuilt: 2 April 1975
- Years active: 1953–present
- Architects: Hallam and Brooks (Havering Council)
- Builder: H Webb (Construction) Ltd

Website
- www.queens-theatre.co.uk

Listed Building – Grade II
- Official name: Queens Theatre
- Designated: 13 May 2022
- Reference no.: 1480655

The Queen's Theatre is a 507-seat mid-scale producing theatre located in Hornchurch in the London Borough of Havering, East London, United Kingdom.

The theatre was originally located on Station Lane, Hornchurch, on a site that was used as a cinema and had become derelict. Hornchurch Urban District Council was one of the first councils to use powers of the Local Government Act 1948 to purchase the building in 1948. The 379-seat theatre opened in 1953, the same year as the Coronation of Elizabeth II. It opened as a repertory theatre with each production staged for two weeks.

Expected to be demolished to make way for a proposed road scheme, it was relocated to a new purpose-built building on Billet Lane in 1975. The theatre survived an extended period without Arts Council funding from 1985 to 2000, which caused it to be threatened with closure. Under the artistic direction of Bob Carlton and then Douglas Rintoul the fortunes of the theatre improved. Building improvement works took place in 2019. The theatre has been a Grade II listed building since 2022.

== History ==
=== Station Lane site ===
The first site was located on Station Lane, Hornchurch. It had operated as a cinema from 1913 to 1935 under the names Hornchurch Cinema and Super Cinema. The building fell into disuse in 1935. During World War II, it was used first for storage of drugs and medical supplies, and then to store furniture. The Local Government Act 1948 permitted councils to operate or contribute to the running of entertainment and cultural venues. Hornchurch Urban District Council was one of the first councils to take up these powers. (Note: The Belgrade Theatre in Coventry, opened in 1958, was the first purpose-built civic theatre using these powers.) It purchased the derelict cinema in 1948 in order to convert it into a theatre.

The 379-seat theatre was opened by Ralph Richardson on 21 September 1953 and the inaugural production was See How They Run. The theatre was named to reflect its opening in the same year as the Coronation of Elizabeth II. It was incorporated as a charity called the Hornchurch Theatre Trust on 19 October 1953. The eight directors were made up of two members from each political party represented on the council. After opening, the Hornchurch Council purchased additional land adjacent to the theatre in order to provide a car park, workshops and dressing rooms.

It ran as a repertory theatre with a company called the Queen's Players. Each production was staged for two weeks. Initially, it operated without any grant income. (Note: Arts Council grant funding began in 1953/54.) It was anticipated that the theatre could break even if attendance did not fall below 60%. It was successful in its opening year and was able to pay its running costs and rent, and repay a £500 loan (equivalent to £12,128 in 2025). After three years and seventy productions, including an annual pantomime, the theatre had maintained an average of 70% attendance.

Stuart Burge was the first director of productions. Clifford Williams was appointed to the role in 1958. Tony Richardson was appointed director of productions in 1959. David Phethean was director of productions from 1960. Ian Curteis, appointed December 1962, was director of productions for eight months in 1963, until he quit due to a disagreement with the directors. His last production was Candida.

Hornchurch Urban District Council was replaced by Havering London Borough Council in 1965 when Hornchurch became part of the London Borough of Havering. Havering Council planned to demolish the theatre in 1970 to make way for a road scheme. The last performance at the theatre was the closing night of a pantomime on Saturday 8 February 1975.

=== Move to Billet Lane ===
Havering Council was considering a new site for the theatre in 1968 and commissioned a study to evaluate the likely attendance if the theatre moved to an alternative site in Hornchurch or was relocated to Romford. The study showed that if the theatre was located in Romford, it would likely have a 25% greater attendance than in Hornchurch. Despite this, the reputation of the existing theatre was the deciding factor in keeping the theatre in Hornchurch.

The new theatre on Billet Lane, Hornchurch, was designed by Havering borough architects Hallam and Brooks. Construction was by H Webb (Construction) Ltd, a local firm of builders. It cost £718,921, paid by Havering Council. The theatre opened with quadraphonic sound equipment, radio assistive listening and air conditioning. The total cost was £1 million (equivalent to £7,766,938 in 2025), with £100,000 from the Arts Council of Great Britain. Havering Council increased domestic rates by ½p to pay for its contribution. Annual running costs for the new theatre were met by £45,000 from the Arts Council, £20,000 from Havering Council and £11,500 from the Greater London Council.

Peter Hall officially opened the new theatre on 2 April 1975, with an initial production of Joseph and the Amazing Technicolour Dreamcoat. Food and drink were available all day. An innovation was the season ticket plan, described at the time as "Rentaseat", that offered 20% discount on theatre tickets and also entrance to Hornchurch Football Club. The theatre had two artistic directors, John Hole and Paul Tomlinson. Regular Sunday jazz music performances were introduced to the foyer in February 1976.

=== Funding crisis ===
The theatre was significantly affected by the impact of the Local Government Act 1985 on arts funding. Up until 1984/85 the Hornchurch Theatre Trust received an annual grant of £148,000 (equivalent to £482,041 in 2025) from the Arts Council. This was reduced to zero from 1985/86 onwards as part of a policy of redistributing funding away from London to the metropolitan counties where the county councils that were funding the arts had been abolished. The Greater London Council, who had been funding the theatre, was also abolished as part of the reforms. This left Havering Council as the only grant giver funding the theatre.

Bob Tomson replaced John Hole as artistic director in 1985. By 1994 the theatre was receiving £236,000 from grant funding and income from ticket sales had increased with an average of 75% attendance. Havering Council had largely replaced the Arts Council funding and this was supplemented by a grant from the London Boroughs Grants Committee.

Marina Caldarone was appointed artistic director in 1991, replacing Bob Tomson. The charity name was changed to Havering Theatre Trust and in 1995 the number of trustees increased to eighteen.

=== Improved fortunes ===
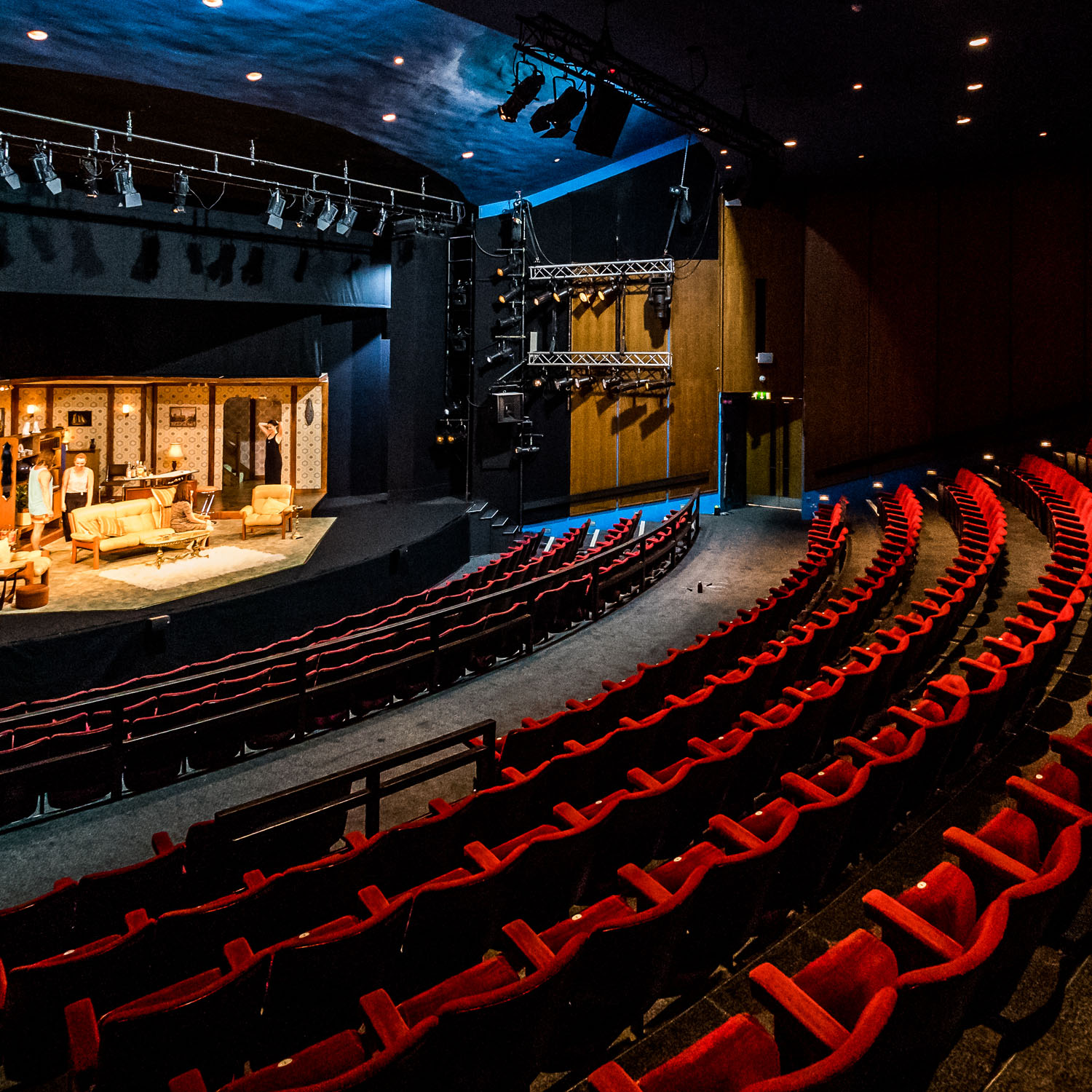
The Queen's Theatre Auditorium 2018

Bob Carlton was appointed artistic director in 1997, replacing Marina Caldarone. Carlton is credited as restoring Arts Council funding after a 15 year hiatus and saving the theatre from closure. In 2000, a new £50,000 fund was created by the London Arts Board (a regional body of the Arts Council) for theatres in Outer London and the Queen's Theatre received the entire pot. Havering Council was providing a grant of £340,000 with 75% of income coming from ticket sales. The theatre received increased London Arts funding to £165,000 over three years from 2001 and was visited by the Culture Secretary, Chris Smith, who promised to work to increase funding.

Queen Elizabeth II visited the theatre in 2003 as part of the Golden Jubilee celebrations and marking the 50th year of the theatre.

There was a 6.9% cut in arts council funding in 2010. In 2014, Arts Council England funding was secured until 2018.

Replacing Bob Carlton, Douglas Rintoul became artistic director in 2015. In 2018 the theatre received a grant of £350,000 from Arts Council England for building improvements. The bar was relocated to the foyer area in 2019.

In 2019, Arts Council England awarded £1 million to a consortium of eight arts and cultural organisations, led by the theatre, to create the Havering Changing cultural programme. The theatre won The Stage Awards for London Theatre of the Year in January 2020.

=== New creative direction ===
In 2021 the theatre received a £100,000 grant from Havering Council to help it recover after the COVID-19 pandemic had caused restrictions to the opening and operating of theatres for extended periods.

Douglas Rintoul quit as artistic director in January 2022. In March that year it was announced that there would no longer be a single artistic director of the theatre with a new model of rolling co-directors and associates. These were initially associate directors Maisey Bawden and Danielle Kassaraté with the Graeae Theatre Company as creative associate.

The theatre was Grade II listed on 13 May 2022 as part of the Platinum Jubilee of Elizabeth II celebrations. In November 2022, Arts Council funding was increased.

Alex Thorpe, Kate Lovell and Aisling Gallagher were announced as three new creative co-directors in May 2023.

== Productions ==
=== Station Lane ===
- See How They Run (1953)
- The Lady's Not for Burning (1954), starring Tom Chatto.
- The Queen and the Welshman (1958), the one hundredth production.
- Gaslight (1968)

=== Billet Lane ===
- Joseph and the Amazing Technicolor Dreamcoat (1975)
- Tommy (1978)
- Steaming (1985)
- Blood Brothers (1987), starring Kiki Dee and Con O'Neill.
- Hair (1989)
- Gaslight (1992)
- Lust (1992)
- It's Now or Never! (1994)
- The Rocky Horror Show (2011)
- Return to the Forbidden Planet (2012), starring Richard O'Brien.
- Made in Dagenham (2016)
- Educating Rita (2017)
- Priscilla, Queen of the Desert (2018)
- As You Like It (2019), musical composed by Shaina Taub.
- Beginning (2021)
- Kinky Boots (2022)
- My Beautiful Laundrette (2024)
- Bedroom Farce (2024)
- The Turn of the Screw (2024)
