= Émile Schneider (actor) =

Canadian film and television actor (born 1989)

- Born: March 30, 1989 (age 37); Granby, Quebec
- Education: Cégep de Saint-Hyacinthe
- Occupation: Actor

Émile Schneider (born March 30, 1989, in Granby, Quebec) is a Canadian film and television actor. He is most noted for his performance in the film Where Atilla Passes (Là où Attila passe), for which he garnered a nomination for the Prix Iris for Best Actor in 2017.

He has also appeared in the films Après la neige, The Lion's Path (Le rang du lion), Les poètes de Ferré, Kiss Me Like a Lover (Embrasse-moi comme tu m'aimes), Le pacte des anges, Forgotten Flowers (Les fleurs oubliées), I'll End Up in Jail (Je finirai en prison), Rebel (Recrue), Maria Chapdelaine, The Vinland Club (Le Club Vinland), Richelieu, Ababooned (Ababouiné), Elsewhere at Night (Ailleurs la nuit) and Tight Lettuce (Tissé serré), and the television series Trauma, Mémoires vives, L'Imposteur, Sortez-moi de moi, La Faille, Portrait-Robot , Stat, Les Armes, Virage and Casse-Gueule.
