= Atikamekw Suns =

2023 film directed by Chloé Leriche

- Cast and family members, showin in 2023
- French: Soleils Atikamekw
- Directed by: Chloé Leriche
- Written by: Chloé Leriche
- Produced by: Chloé Leriche
- Starring: Jacques Newashish; Mirotansa Chilton; Wikwasa Newashish
- Release date: October 5, 2023 (FNC)
- Running time: 103 minutes
- Country: Canada
- Languages: French; Atikamekw

Atikamekw Suns (French: Soleils Atikamekw) is a 2023 Canadian drama film, written, produced, and directed by Chloé Leriche. The film centres on the true story of five youths from the Atikamekw First Nation community of Manawan who were found dead in a truck in the nearby river in 1977, with police investigation remaining inconclusive to this day about whether the truck driving into the river was a simple accident or a racially motivated attack.

Its cast includes Jacques Newashish, Mirotansa Chilton, Wikwasa Newashish-Petiquay, Carl-David Ottawa, Lise-Yolande Awashish and Oshim Ottawa.

== Production ==
The film received production funding from Quebec's Société de développement des entreprises culturelles in 2019, and from Telefilm Canada in 2020. Its planned filming in summer 2020 was disrupted by the COVID-19 pandemic.

The film was shot principally in collaboration with the community of Manawan, although auditions were held in some other Quebec cities to allow First Nations actors from outside the community to try out for various roles in the film.

== Distribution ==
The film premiered at the 2023 Festival du nouveau cinéma.

== Awards ==
The film was shortlisted for the 2023 Jean-Marc Vallée DGC Discovery Award.

At the 2023 Festival du nouveau cinéma, it won the TV5 Public Prize for most popular francophone film. At the 2023 Abitibi-Témiscamingue International Film Festival, it won the Médiafilm Robert-Claude Bérubé Prize.

The film screened in the Borsos Competition at the 2023 Whistler Film Festival, where it won the awards for Best Film, Best Director for Leriche, and Best Performance for the film's entire cast as an ensemble.

In 2024, the film was the winner of the Prix Gilles-Carle from the Association québécoise des critiques de cinéma after being shown at the Rendez-vous Québec Cinéma. In 2025, it won the Prix Luc-Perreault, and the Prix collégial du cinéma québécois.
