= List of characters in mythology novels by Rick Riordan =

A list of most characters in various mythology series by American author Rick Riordan.

== Camp Half-Blood Chronicles ==
=== Introduced in Percy Jackson & the Olympians ===
==== Percy Jackson ====
Perseus "Percy" Jackson is a demigod, son of Poseidon and the mortal Sally Jackson. Percy lives on the Upper East Side of Manhattan. He has black hair and sea-green eyes. He has inherited special abilities from Poseidon, which include the ability to control water, boats, and ships; create small hurricanes; breathe and see clearly underwater; and talk to horse-like creatures and most aquatic animals. He struggles in his mortal life, having ADHD and dyslexia. This made him at first the subject of bullying from his peers. Percy is the first-person narrator in the Percy Jackson & the Olympians and The Senior Year Adventures.

Percy is a gifted swordsman using his shape-shifting sword pen Riptide (Ancient Greek: "Anaklusmos") for battle. It always appears back in his pocket even if he loses it. He is currently dating Annabeth.

In the films, Percy is portrayed by Logan Lerman. In the musical, he is portrayed by Chris McCarrell. Walker Scobell portrays the role in the TV series, with Azriel Dalman playing a younger Percy in flashbacks.

==== Grover Underwood ====
Grover Underwood is a satyr and Percy's best friend. He has curly reddish-brown hair and fur, acne, and a wispy goatee. His horns grow larger as the series progresses, and he takes increasingly careful measures to hide them and his goat legs while posing as a human. When he first appears, he walks with crutches, which Percy eventually learns are to hide his goat-like trot. He uses reed pipes to play music and sometimes has a cudgel. In The Battle of the Labyrinth, Grover is bestowed a part of Pan's essence by the Lord of the Wild himself Pan. Grover also begins a relationship with the dryad Juniper.

In The Lightning Thief, he earns a searcher's license after delivering Percy safely, allowing him to search for the lost god Pan. When Polyphemus captures him in The Sea of Monsters, he activates an empathic link with Percy that he had established a year prior and allows telepathic communication across great distances. At the end of The Last Olympian, he is named a Lord of the Wild and given a seat on the satyrs' ruling council, the Council of Cloven Elders.

In The Heroes of Olympus, Grover mainly appears as one of Camp Half-Blood's satyr allies reporting on Gaea's rising and participating in negotiations with the Romans to get Reyna to help transport the Athena Parthenos statue across the world.

In The Dark Prophecy, Meg summons Grover after getting a prophecy stating that she and Apollo will need a satyr guide. In The Burning Maze, Grover guides the two through the Labyrinth and, alongside the other nature spirits, aids in their fight against Medea and Caligula. After the death of Medea and Helios fading from existence, ending the California wildfires that he was causing, Grover returns to Camp Half-Blood.

In The Chalice of the Gods, Grover volunteers to join Percy's quests to get recommendation letters from the gods so that he can get into New Rome University. Grover uses his nature spirit connections to help search for Ganymede's chalice of immortality and then to help Percy sneak into Mount Olympus to return it to Ganymede in the midst of Zeus' brunch for his mother Rhea.

In Wrath of the Triple Goddess, Grover drinks a strawberry-flavored potion. He destroys Hecate's mansion and Hecuba and Gale escape the mansion, but later in the book, he helps to fix the mansion and get the pets back.

In the films, he is portrayed by Brandon T. Jackson and Bjorn Yearwood as young Grover in the second film. In the musical, he is portrayed by George Salazar. Aryan Simhadri portrays Grover in the TV series.

==== Annabeth Chase ====
Annabeth Chase is a demigod, daughter of Athena and West Point history professor Frederick Chase. She has an extensive paternal family, including Magnus Chase. Annabeth has honey-blonde hair and gray eyes. She has arachnophobia, a fear shared by her siblings due to their mother's relationship with Arachne, whom Athena turned into a spider. She also has dyslexia and ADHD but is good at keeping them in check. She is currently dating Percy; she develops a crush on him over multiple books.

Annabeth ran away from her father and stepfamily when she was seven and encountered Luke and Thalia. They lived as runaways until they were found by Grover and taken to Camp Half-Blood. Her attempts to bring Luke back into the fold are an important theme in the books.

Her main weapon is a short celestial bronze knife given to her by Luke. Annabeth also has an invisibility Yankees cap, a gift from her mother. At the end of The Battle of the Labyrinth, Daedalus gives Annabeth an advanced laptop of his and she studies his works. She loses it and her knife in The Mark of Athena when she and Percy fall into Tartarus.

In the films, she is portrayed by Alexandra Daddario, and Alisha Newton portrays a young Annabeth in the second film. In the American musical, she was portrayed by Kristin Stokes. Leah Jeffries portrays Annabeth in the TV series with her younger cousin Marissa Winans playing a younger Annabeth in flashbacks.

==== Chiron ====
Chiron is a centaur with a white stallion body and a son of Kronos. He is Percy's mentor and the activities director at Camp Half-Blood. He is the mythological Chiron who was granted immortality by the gods for as long as he is needed to train heroes. In The Lighting Thief, he first appears disguised as a Latin teacher, Mr. Brunner, at Percy's school. He also gives Percy Riptide.

In The Sea of Monsters, when Thalia's tree becomes poisoned, Chiron is blamed due to him being a son of Kronos and he is banished from camp. After Percy tricks Luke into exonerating Chiron, the centaur arrives with the Party Ponies, who are Chiron's cousins, to rescue Percy, Annabeth, Grover, and Tyson from the Princess Andromeda.

In The Battle of Labyrinth, Chiron becomes suspicious of the new sword instructor Quintus, who later turns out to be Daedalus in disguise. He also organizes the quest into the Labyrinth and participates in the battle with a monster army invading from the maze. Although Chiron is badly wounded, he survives the fight.

In The Last Olympian, Chiron leaves Percy to lead the army of Camp Half-Blood while he gathers much-needed reinforcements from the Party Ponies. Chiron directly confronts and is defeated by his father Kronos in battle. After Kronos' eventual defeat, Chiron allows Rachel into Camp Half-Blood to become the new Oracle of Delphi.

In The Lost Hero, Chiron refuses to tell the Greeks about the Romans as he has sworn to keep the secret due to the historic rivalry between the two. He eventually admits the truth about the Greeks and Romans after the quest to rescue Hera and the discovery of Bunker 9, but Chiron does not know where the Roman camp is.

In The Blood of Olympus, Chiron participates in the final battle with Gaea and leads a funeral alongside Nico for the campers who were killed in the battle, Greek and Roman.

In The Hidden Oracle, six months later, Chiron is still in charge of Camp Half-Blood, and he is dealing with missing campers, down communications and the arrival of a now mortal Apollo. He later participates in the battle with Nero's automaton.

In The Tower of Nero, Chiron is away from camp when Apollo and Meg return months later to face Nero. Chiron returns in time to receive a message from Rachel summoning reinforcements from camp which Chiron personally leads, disguising it as a field trip for the youngest campers.

In The Sun and the Star, Chiron is left alone at camp with Dionysus, Nico, and Will when the vast majority of the campers decide to return home for the school year. Along with the wine god, Chiron reluctantly authorizes the two demigods to go on a quest to Tartarus to rescue Bob and greets them upon Nico and Will's successful return with the Titan.

In Wrath of the Triple Goddess, Chiron surprises Percy by becoming his substitute history teacher at Alternative High School, although Chiron explains that it is simply a coincidence. Wanting to simply be a teacher sometimes, Chiron got Paul Blofis to put him on the district's substitute list. Percy then learns that Chiron's wheelchair is not just a disguise; he was previously accidentally shot in the leg by Hercules, causing him to have difficulty walking. Chiron provides Percy with information on Hecuba and is gone a few days later, much to Percy's disappointment.

Chiron is played by Pierce Brosnan in The Lightning Thief film and by Anthony Head in The Sea of Monsters film. In the musical, he is portrayed by Jonathan Raviv. In the TV series, he is portrayed by Glynn Turman, with the character depicted with a leg brace on his left hind leg as the result of the war injury.

==== Luke Castellan ====
Luke Castellan was a son of Hermes and May Castellan. He is described as handsome, with blonde hair, blue eyes, and a long scar on the side of his face given to him by Ladon. Besides the ability to open locks with his mind, which he inherited from his father, Luke is an excellent swordsman.

Introduced initially as the friendly head counselor of the Hermes cabin, Luke was resentful of his father, who adhered to the gods' policy of non-interference despite Luke's mother May Castellan's mental illness. Luke runs away from home at nine years old and eventually arrived at camp aged fourteen with Annabeth and Thalia. After the loss of Thalia, a failed quest and continued silence from Hermes, Luke's ongoing resentment turned into a strong hatred of his father and the other gods. At the end of The Lightning Thief, he is revealed to serve Kronos and receives a sword named "Backbiter" from Kronos. It is later reforged as Kronos' scythe and has the ability to harm both mortals and immortals. Just before giving himself over completely to host the spirit of Kronos, Luke bathes in the River Styx and obtains the invincibility of Achilles.

At the end of the series, Luke is eventually convinced to fight against Kronos, committing suicide to destroy the Titan, who was using Luke as his host, by stabbing himself in his "Achilles' heel" with a celestial bronze knife he had given to Annabeth when they first met with a promise to always remain her family, which becomes cursed after Luke's defection. When he died, Luke reiterates what Ethan had told Percy before: Unclaimed children and unrecognized gods deserve more respect than they had been given.

In the films, he is portrayed by Jake Abel, with Samuel Braun as a young Luke in the second film. In the musical, he is portrayed by James Hayden Rodriguez. Charlie Bushnell portrays Luke in the TV series.

==== Thalia Grace ====
Thalia Grace is the daughter of Zeus and Beryl Grace, a TV starlet. Her brother Jason was seven years younger than she.

Due to her mother's abusive nature, Thalia had considered leaving home since she was little, but stayed to protect Jason. When Jason is sacrificed to Hera by their mother during a visit to Sonora, Thalia finally runs away and stays on the run with Luke and Annabeth until they met Grover when she was 12. When they reached camp, Hades sent a horde of hellhounds that Thalia held off, sacrificing herself for her friends. Zeus pitied his daughter and turned her into a pine tree; her spirit then provided a magical barrier around the camp, keeping mortals and monsters out. Seven years later, she is separated from the pine tree with the Golden Fleece, which was applied to save it from poisons that were destroying the magical barrier protecting the demigods.

No longer assumed dead, she is the oldest surviving child of the Big Three gods, and thus was first in line to be the child of the prophecy. In The Titan's Curse, she is one of three chosen by Zoë to accompany her on her quest. On this quest, she is confronted by Luke, who she has not seen since she was turned into a pine tree. She refuses his offer to join him in his crusade. At the end of The Titan's Curse, she becomes the lieutenant of the Hunters of Artemis which freezes her age the night before her 16th birthday and prevents her from being the child of the prophecy. She returns occasionally to aid characters in later books.

Thalia has bright blue eyes and short, spiky black hair, and wears black eyeliner and punk style clothing. Jason describes her as having a Mediterranean complexion. She also shares some traits with her father, such as his pride, confidence, and vehement reactions to betrayal or contradiction. An incredibly skilled warrior, Thalia's weapons are a replica of the shield Égida named Aegis and a spear. Her main power is the ability to summon lightning and generate electric shocks. In The Titan's Curse, she ironically shows a fear of heights, despite being a daughter of Zeus.

She is portrayed by Paloma Kwiatkowski and Katelyn Mayer as the young Thalia in the second film. In the TV series, she is portrayed by Tamara Smart. Unlike the books, Thalia was saved from the Furies by Zeus and he turned her into a tree when she declined to become her father's "weapon". Her tree was poisoned by Luke using Python blood. When the Golden Fleece was placed onto the tree by Clarisse, Thalia emerged from the tree and her electrokinesis repelled Luke's army while knocking herself and Percy for three days.

==== Zoë Nightshade ====
Zoë Nightshade was the daughter of Atlas and Pleione. She was introduced as one of Artemis' huntresses, appearing in The Titan's Curse. She was described as looking around 14 years of age, although it was later revealed that she was well over 20,000 years old and a former Hesperid.

Zoë is described as tall, graceful and gorgeously beautiful with brown eyes, a slightly upturned nose, copper-colored skin, and long dark hair braided with a silver circlet on the top. When angry, she is said to have the same cold look in her eyes as her father, the Titan Atlas.

In her early life, Zoë helped Hercules complete his quest to steal the golden apple. Her sister Hesperides exiled her for this, causing her great pain because they were her only family. Ultimately, Hercules never gave Zoë any credit and eventually abandoned her. As a result, she holds a grudge against male Heroes.

After the Hesperides rejected her, Zoë joined the Hunters of Artemis, eventually rising to become Artemis' loyal lieutenant for over 2,000 years. Throughout the book, Zoë talks in Early Modern English. She also is said to speak in an old, strange accent.

Zoë shows particular interest in and love for the stars. The goddess Artemis transforms Zoë into a constellation upon her death.

In the TV series, she is portrayed by Saara Chaudry.

==== Tyson ====
Tyson is a Cyclops and Percy's half-brother. He is tall with unkempt teeth and fingernails, brown hair, and an eye. He is described as seemly young though intelligent. As a Cyclops, he has immunity to fire, super strength, an uncanny ability to mimic voices, enhanced senses, and understands the "old tongue" (the language spoken by Gaea to her first children). Tyson is close with several characters and magical creatures in the series, including Rainbow the hippocampus, the hellhound Mrs. O'Leary, and the harpy Ella, who eventually becomes his girlfriend.

In The Sea of Monsters, Tyson first appears as a huge homeless kid that is taken in as a class project by a school called Meriwether Prep. Tyson is sensitive, childish, and bullied with Percy being his only friend. He defends Percy when the Laistrygonians attack in the guise of a dodgeball game. Percy is forced to take him to camp, and a short time after they arrive, it is revealed that he is a baby Cyclops and thus a son of Poseidon, making him Percy's half-brother. Tyson faces a great deal of prejudice from the other campers due to his monster heritage and frustration from Percy when Poseidon claims Tyson as his son, causing Percy to be bullied as well. Charles Beckendorf's father, Hephaestus, employs Cyclopes, and he befriends Tyson and trains him in metalworking. When Percy and Annabeth secretly leave on a quest for the Golden Fleece, they only reluctantly take Tyson along and he befriends the hippocampus Rainbow who transports them to the Princess Andromeda. His gift to Percy, a wristwatch that Tyson had spent the summer working on, is a shield.

In The Last Olympian, Percy meets his brother again a year later when, after the destruction of the Princess Andromeda, he ends up in Atlantis. He later helps to defeat Typhon, leading Poseidon's army of Cyclopes. Following the defeat of Kronos, Zeus commends Tyson's bravery by making him the General of the Cyclopes.

In The Son of Neptune, Tyson is searching for the missing and amnesic Percy. When Percy's memories begin to return and he is unable to Iris message any of his friends, Percy manages to contact Tyson through a dream. Ella comments on Tyson's bravery and Percy notices that his brother is blushing, causing Percy to tease him about the romance blooming between Tyson and Ella. Tyson takes part in the Battle of New Rome, effortlessly killing Ma Gasket and her children and also battling Earthborn.

In The Mark of Athena, Tyson is present when the Argo II arrives. After Ella issues a prophecy, Percy discreetly orders Tyson to take Ella away, not wanting Octavian to learn of the harpy's knowledge of the lost Sibylline Books. After things go south, Percy contacts Tyson and orders him to take Ella to Camp Half-Blood where the harpy will be safe.

In The Blood of Olympus, Tyson is mentioned to have brought in a few friendly Cyclopes to aid in Camp Half-Blood's defense. Tyson brings Ella and Coach Hedge back to Camp Half-Blood on Rainbow and relays Reyna's message about her intention to come at sunrise. During the ultimate battle with Gaea, Tyson leads the friendly Cyclopes against the Earth goddess and her monster army. Afterwards, with the powers of prophecy no longer working, Tyson joins Ella and Rachel in traveling to New Rome in the hopes of reconstructing the Sibylline Books, the only source of prophecies left at the moment.

In The Tyrant's Tomb, Tyson and Ella have settled in New Rome where the harpy has been using her photographic memory to reconstruct the lost Sibylline Books.

In The Court of the Dead, Tyson is mentioned to still be living in New Rome with Ella and running their bookstore together. While they do not appear, Tyson and Ella help Johan with his research and the Cyclops crafts the harnesses used by the demigod-mythic strike team to carry the Coco Puffs into battle.

In the films, he is portrayed by Douglas Smith. In the TV series, he is portrayed by Daniel Diemer.

==== Nico di Angelo ====
Niccolò "Nico" di Angelo is an Italian-born Greek demigod who is the son of Hades and the Italian mortal Maria di Angelo. He is 10 years old in his first appearance in The Titan's Curse and 15 years old in his latest appearance in The Court of the Dead. He is an Italian boy with black hair, dark brown eyes, and olive skin.

Nico is first seen in The Titan's Curse as an unclaimed demigod rescued by Percy, Annabeth, Thalia, and Grover. At the end of the novel, it is revealed that Nico is a time-displaced son of Hades. Despite biologically being 10 years old when first introduced, he and his elder sister Bianca were born in the 1920s. After Zeus killed their mother Maria while trying to kill the children, Hades wiped their memories and placed them in the Lotus Hotel, where time stands still for decades, before they were removed and brought to the military academy Westover Hall.

He is native to Venice and can speak Italian (as his native language). Nico is initially depicted as cheerful and childlike, with olive skin and dark hair. He enjoyed playing Mythomagic, a Greek mythology-themed card game. He takes the death of Bianca very hard, becoming moody, secretive, and irritable blaming Percy Jackson for it, though he later forgives him. Afterward, he lived in the Underworld with his father Hades, where he becomes pale and shaggy-haired and begins wearing dark clothing. Nico, despite being very powerful, is extremely lonely, much like his father. His weapon is a Stygian iron sword, capable of absorbing monsters' essences rather than banishing them to Tartarus.

Nico's suggestion that Percy take on the curse of Achilles and his work to convince Hades to fight in The Last Olympian is crucial to the Olympians' success. He brings his half-sister Hazel back from the dead and establishes her at Camp Jupiter. At the end of The Son of Neptune, Nico travels through Tartarus to find the monstrous side of the Doors of Death.

In The Sun and the Star, two months after The Tower of Nero, Rachel gives Nico and Will the prophecy for their quest to Tartarus for the twelfth time, prompting Nico to convince a reluctant Chiron to give them an official quest.

Greek American novice actor Levi Chrisopulos portrays Nico in the TV series.

==== Rachel Dare ====
Rachel Elizabeth Dare, also known as the "Oracle of Delphi", is a mortal girl who can see through the Mist, the force that obscures gods and monsters from most mortals. Her father, Walter Dare, is a rich businessman, a fact which she is rather averse to. She first meets Percy in The Titan's Curse at the Hoover Dam, and they become friends. In The Battle of the Labyrinth, she guides Percy through the Labyrinth to Daedalus' workshop. It is hinted that she has some romantic feelings for Percy (which are noticed by Annabeth, who becomes extremely jealous). In The Last Olympian, she experiences strange visions about the Second Titan War.

Later, after speaking with Chiron, she decides to become the new Oracle of Delphi, according to her fate. She gives up her feelings for Percy, her life as she knows it, and chances the tormented fates of her predecessors to take on this daunting task. She has been driven mad like other oracles have. Her role as the oracle greatly aids the characters for the rest of the books. Rachel's first act as the Oracle is to deliver the next Great Prophecy, setting the plot of The Heroes of Olympus.

Following the loss of Delphi to Python, Rachel stops visiting camp and begins a frenzied attempt to regain her foresight. Once informed of Apollo's arrival, Rachel returns and learns that not only Delphi is lost, but also three other Oracles, and that only Rhea's Dodonian Oracle is still valid. She becomes upset upon learning of the existence of other Oracles, as Apollo has not told her before. In The Tower of Nero, Rachel regains her powers of foresight after Apollo kills Python and helps him battle Nero. She also provides Nico and Will with a prophecy.

In The Sun and the Star, two months after regaining her powers, Rachel has been forced to repeat her prophecy for Nico and Will's quest twelve times until they actually leave on it. It is later revealed that Hades had sent Nico the prophecy through Rachel so that Nico would rescue Bob.

She has red hair and freckles, is skilled at painting and drawing, and occasionally shown as a non-ADHD foil for her demigod teammates. Percy remarks on her ability to stand still for a long time at a charity event. Rachel has the power of foresight.

==== Clarisse La Rue ====
Clarisse La Rue is a daughter of Ares and the former lead counselor of the Ares cabin at Camp Half-Blood. She is hot-tempered, courageous, strong, an incredible fighter (usually using an electric spear), and a good military strategist. She can be stubborn and overconfident, much like her father. Despite their similarities, Clarisse has a fear of her father and disappointing him. This, along with a strong sense of honor and pride, often motivates her actions. She is aggressive toward most demigods, though she does respect and make friends with a few.

In The Sea of Monsters, Clarisse is given the quest to find the Golden Fleece. She is a main character in the short story "Percy Jackson and the Stolen Chariot". In The Last Olympian, Clarisse initially sits out the war for Olympus due to a personal feud. Enraged after the loss of her friend Silena, she later joins the battle, slaying a drakon and receiving the blessing of Ares. In The Blood of Olympus, Clarisse leads the Greek demigods into battle to defend the camp.

In The Wild Zone, she, Katie, Harper, Zuri, Benny, and Grant go to The Wild Zone.

In the film adaptations, she is portrayed by Leven Rambin. In the musical, she is portrayed by Sarah Beth Pfeifer. Dior Goodjohn portrays Clarisse in the TV series.

==== Will Solace ====
William Andrew Solace, also known as Will, is a demigod, son of Apollo and the mortal Naomi Solace.

He is a minor character in both Percy Jackson & the Olympians and The Heroes of Olympus, though becomes a supporting character in The Trials of Apollo, and finally becomes the deuteragonist of The Nico di Angelo Adventures.

He is the camp's best combat medic and is stated to run the infirmary several times. He is also the head of the Apollo cabin after the death of Michael Yew.

In contrast to his siblings, he lacks skills in archery due to his inherited gifts being for healing rather than combat. Though he later discovers he has several abilities, including using light rays and diseases alike as a weapon.

In The Last Olympian, when Annabeth had a knife wound in her shoulder, Will uses his healing powers to help cure Annabeth.

In The Blood of Olympus, Will attends a head counselor meeting discussing the situation with Romans. Will helps deliver Chuck, the son of Mellie and Gleason Hedge. Shortly after this, Will and Nico's team sabotages the Roman onagers, with Will using his ultrasonic whistle to help stun both the Greeks and Romans.

In The Hidden Oracle, Nico and Will are shown to have started dating each other in the six months since the battle. When Will's now-mortal father Apollo arrives at camp, Will and Nico aid Apollo in his quest and in adjusting to being mortal. After the battle with Nero's forces, Will treats the worst of the camp's cases of hay fever caused by Apollo's plague arrow.

In The Tower of Nero, Nico becomes depressed following the death of Jason as well as his other losses; Will is supportive and concerned for his boyfriend during these times. During the final battle with Nero, Nico and Will help Apollo alongside the troglodytes, with Will at one point arriving with unexpected reinforcements from camp, just as Nero has the upper hand. Following Nero's death, Will helps treat everyone's injuries and helps Apollo prepare for his final battle with Python.

In The Sun and the Star, two months after receiving their prophecy, Nico and Will are the last kids at camp after all of the other demigods, including the year-rounders, choose to leave to see the world or to be with their mortal families at the end of the summer.

In The Court of the Dead, Will's archery skills vastly improve after months of training. He is also able to purposefully use his light as a flashbang and when enraged, glows bright and hot enough to harm a minor goddess at a distance and has to power down to avoid accidentally incinerating Hazel with his touch when Will catches her.

==== Calypso ====
Calypso is the daughter of the Titan Atlas, who is imprisoned on the island of Ogygia for supporting her father during the First Titan War. She first appears in The Battle of the Labyrinth, where she nurses Percy back to health. She falls in love with Percy and is heartbroken when he has to leave. Percy asks the gods to release her at the end of The Last Olympian, but she is still residing there when Leo becomes trapped on Ogygia in The House of Hades, having been released from the curse of being forced to fall in love with all those to fall upon the island rather than the island itself. Leo and Calypso subsequently fall in love legitimately. When Leo leaves the island, he swears on the River Styx that he will return for Calypso. At the end of The Blood of Olympus, Leo gets back to Ogygia and frees Calypso.

In The Hidden Oracle, Calypso comes to Camp Half-Blood with Leo and reveals that, due to her choice to leave Ogygia, she has become a mortal. She accompanies Leo and Apollo in the latter's quest to find the Oracles and stop the Three Emperors from conquering North America. At the end of The Dark Prophecy, Calypso stays at the Waystation, while Leo goes to warn Camp Jupiter of an impending invasion and Apollo travels with Meg to search for the Erythraean Sybil. During The Dark Prophecy, Calypso regains her ability to use magic, although the goddess Britomartis suggests that she had simply lost control of her powers rather than losing them altogether. With training from Josephine, Calypso begins regaining control over her magic.

As a sorceress, Calypso can command wind spirits to do her bidding. She loses most of her control of them when she gives up her immortality; however, she is still capable of summoning them to a degree, though by consuming more power than usual. Also, due to spending a long time at Ogygia, she has mastered sewing and lock-picking, which she uses while finding the gryphons at Indianapolis Zoo. She is Leo's girlfriend as of The Blood of Olympus, The Hidden Oracle, The Dark Prophecy, and The Burning Maze. In The Tower of Nero, Leo reveals that Calypso is enjoying attending high school and is currently working as a counselor at a mortal band camp for kids. The two are currently in a fight due to Leo's disrespectful behavior toward women, but both Leo and Reyna are sure that they will work it out when she returns at the end of the summer.

==== Iapetus / Bob the Titan ====
Iapetus, commonly known as Bob the Titan, is the Lord of the West and the father of Atlas. Bob first appears as one of the main antagonists of "Percy Jackson and the Sword of Hades". He subsequently appears as a main character and a supporting character in The House of Hades and The Sun and the Star.

In "Percy Jackson and the Sword of Hades", Ethan uses the sword of Hades to release Iapetus from where he has been locked in Tartarus for millennia. Iapetus battles Percy, Nico, and Thalia and is thrown into the River Lethe. It erases the Titan's memories, leaving him with a childlike personality. Percy convinces the amnesic Iapetus that he is their friend Bob and he heals Percy's injuries from the fight and aids him in confronting Persephone over her secret creation of the sword in the first place. Bob is subsequently employed as a janitor in the Underworld by Hades.

In The House of Hades, while trapped in Tartarus, Percy and Annabeth briefly reminisce about Bob, inadvertently summoning him to their aid when the Titan overhears them. Bob acts as a guide and protector to Percy and Annabeth, his knowledge of Tartarus from his time trapped there proving vital in their quest to reach the Doors of Death and escape. However, the regenerative effects of Tartarus on monsters starts to heal Bob's mind and slowly restore his memories, including the fact that Percy was the one who erased them in the first place.

Bob befriends Small Bob, a saber tooth cat inadvertently created in The Titan's Curse.

In The Tower of Nero, Nico begins hearing a voice calling out to him for help from Tartarus. Nico later reveals to Apollo that he believes that the voice is Bob, suggesting that the Titan had in fact survived his battle with Tartarus at the Doors of Death.

In The Sun and the Star, he is rescued from Tartarus by Nico and Will. Having been killed fighting Tartarus, a reforming Bob was captured by Nyx who stuck the Titan in a permanent regeneration cycle.

=== Introduced in The Heroes of Olympus ===
==== Reyna Ramírez-Arellano ====
Reyna Avila Ramírez-Arellano (also known by her initials RARA) is a Puerto Rican demigod. She is a daughter of Bellona, a Roman goddess of war, and the younger sister of Queen Hylla of the Amazons. She and her sister worked for Circe during the events of The Sea of Monsters where Reyna was one of the attendants who looked after Annabeth. After Percy and Annabeth escape and free Blackbeard and his crew, Reyna and Hylla were captured by the pirates before eventually escaping and going their separate ways.

Reyna found the way to Camp Jupiter, where she became the praetor of the Twelfth Legion just four years after she joined. She is a well-respected but distrustful leader in New Rome. When she found out about the Greek demigods, Reyna chose not to pursue revenge, despite the difficult history between them, in part due to the impeding battle, which she understands Greeks and the Romans will have to be united to win.

She is described as intimidating and a natural leader; she has glossy black hair and very dark brown eyes. Reyna is a praetor at Camp Jupiter. Reyna's demigod ability is the power to lend her energy, skills, and character traits to nearby demigods. Similar to Leo, she can speak English, Latin and Spanish. Reyna is often accompanied by two magical dogs, Aurum and Argentum, or by her pegasus Scipio ("Skippy" dies after their trip from New York to Greece in The House of Hades after being slashed by a griffin's poisonous claw). Pegasus awards her the title of "Horse Friend" because of her kindness toward Scipio and his descendants. Unlike other characters, Reyna does not have an explicit "fatal flaw", leading to fan speculation including overprotection, distrust, and holding grudges.

In The Blood of Olympus, she, Nico, and Coach Hedge go on a quest to return the Athena Parthenos to Camp Half-Blood. While shadow-traveling to New York, the trio stops in San Juan and visits Reyna's former house, haunted by the ghosts of her relatives. There Reyna reveals that the Ramírez-Arellano family (which includes Roberto Cofresi and Captain Marion Frederic Ramírez de Arellano) has always been favored by Bellona. Reyna's father (an Iraq War veteran) deeply loved the goddess, but his PTSD turned this love into an unhealthy paranoia. When Reyna was ten years old, he became a mania. When the mania attacked Hylla, young Reyna picked up the closest weapon and killed what remained of her father. Reyna is reluctant to discuss the incident because patricide is "unforgivable" in New Rome.

Reyna had romantic feelings for Jason, which is shown throughout the series and noticed by several characters. After Jason had disappeared, it is implied that she briefly considered Percy a romantic partner. In The Tyrant's Tomb, Reyna is revealed to be asexual.

Following the Battle of San Francisco Bay, Reyna resigns as praetor and instead joins the Hunters of Artemis. In The Tower of Nero, after becoming a god once again, Apollo encounters Reyna who is settling in well with the Hunters and has been mentoring Leo in his behavior toward Calypso.

==== Leo Valdez ====
Leonidas "Leo" Valdez is a son of Hephaestus. He likes to joke around and relies on his sense of humor to bury the pain he feels due to his troubled past. He has curly black hair, brown eyes, a cheerful face, a slim and scrawny build, dark skin, and a mischievous smile. He is Hispanic-American and speaks Spanish. Leo can create and manipulate fire. He also has severe ADHD, even by demigod standards. He is an excellent mechanic and at one point repairs a bronze dragon running wild in the camp's woods, which he names Festus (Latin for "happy"). Inspired by a blueprint in Bunker 9, an abandoned bunker in the camp's woods, and a picture he drew in kindergarten, he also creates the Argo II, the flying ship the seven demigods of the Great Prophecy sail on to reach Greece.

When Leo was a small toddler, he met Hera, who, under that time was under the alias Tia Callida, his babysitter, who put him to sleep inside a burning furnace, made him poke snakes, and trained him with knives. His mother, Esparanza Valdez, after finding out, forbade Hera to see him.

When Leo was eight, Gaea burned down his mother's machine shop, resulting in her death, and leading him to believe that it was his fault as he had, and still has, pyrokinesis due to his hertiage to Hephaestus. Leo's remaining family, mostly his aunt Rosa, blamed him for her death and left him a foster child. He meets Piper at the Wilderness School in Nevada, after being in six foster homes. Leo sometimes thinks of himself as a seventh wheel, because in the group of seven he is alone with three couples, as for the first three books of The Heroes of Olympus, because of his insecurities. He eventually meets and falls for the titaness Calypso as she was saved by Leo after the Second Giant War whom he is still dating.

In The Blood of Olympus, Leo sacrifices himself to annihilate Gaea, but is brought back to life using the Physician's Cure and returns for Calypso on her island, Ogygia.

==== Festus ====
Festus is a mechanical dragon made by the Hephaestus cabin at Camp Half-Blood, and given wings by Leo years later. He was first encountered in "Percy Jackson and the Bronze Dragon" where Festus goes on a rampage before being shut down by Percy, Annabeth and Charles Beckendorf, who intend to reprogram Festus. In The Lost Hero, Festus has gone out of control ever since Beckendorf's death, but Leo's immunity to fire allows him to corral and tame the bronze dragon.

Festus transports Jason, Piper, and Leo before being destroyed by a crash-landing at King Midas' mansion. Leo asks Hephaestus to take his head to Bunker Nine at Camp Half-Blood, where he later repairs him to be the figurehead on the Argo II. Festus acts in this role throughout The Mark of Athena and The House of Hades, acting as the ship's control interface and occasionally helping to defend against attacks.

In The Blood of Olympus, Festus is secretly rebuilt by Leo and plays a vital role in the defeat of Gaea, lifting the primordial goddess high in the air where she's weaker and holding Jason and Piper steady as Piper charms the goddess to sleep. After Gaea's defeat, Festus resurrects Leo with the Physician's Cure and helps him rescue Calypso.

In The Trials of Apollo, Festus acts as one of Apollo's allies. In The Burning Maze, Festus transports Leo to Camp Jupiter to warn them of an upcoming attack and is mentioned to have helped to defend the camp. In The Tower of Nero, Leo mentions that he's using Festus as his workshop while Leo teaches homeless kids shop skills.

==== Piper McLean ====
Piper McLean is a daughter of Aphrodite and famous actor Tristan McLean. She is fifteen in The Lost Hero. Unlike most children of Aphrodite, Piper is not particularly obsessed with beauty or fashion. Piper is Cherokee on her father's side. She has tan skin, kaleidoscope eyes (they change color constantly), and choppy chocolate-colored hair which she cuts herself. Her demigod powers include "charmspeaking" (magical hypnosis) and the ability to speak French, as it is "the language of love". She is also occasionally able to see visions in her magic dagger Katoptris (ancient Greek for "mirror"), which once belonged to Helen of Troy. The dagger lost that power after the battle against the giants in Athens.

Piper's relationship with her father is mutually affectionate but strained, in part because of the small amount of attention he gives for her. After he is kidnapped by the giant Enceladus in The Lost Hero and subsequently rescued by Piper, Jason, and Leo, Mr. McLean's relationship with his daughter begins to improve. Piper is also very close to Jason and Leo, who are her best friends. She is also friends with all of the seven quest members in The Heroes of Olympus.

Piper's main weapon is Katoptris, though she later acquires a magic cornucopia and uses it as a weapon. After being captured by pirates in The House of Hades, Piper asks Hazel to teach her sword fighting, using a jagged celestial bronze sword taken from the Boread Zethes.

Piper's main love interest is Jason Grace, son of Jupiter, whom she met at school after Jason was placed there by Hera. She is shown to be very happy with him and date happily throughout their time as the 7. Their relationship unfortunately did not last as Piper breaks up with him while they are both attending school on California. Piper's family then moves to Oklahoma and she begins dating a Native American mortal named Shel.

In the Burning Maze, she is called upon by a depowered Apollo to help recruit Jason and help defeat the Roman Emperor Caligula. She is there to witness Jason's death at the hands on the emperor and proceeds to mourn him for a long while after.

In the Sun and the Star, Nico decides to give Piper a call to talk about his grief over Jason's death. Piper and Nico comfort each other while she reassures him that she is there for him always.

==== Jason Grace ====
Jason Grace was a son of Jupiter, Roman version of Zeus and the mortal actress Beryl Grace, and the younger brother of Thalia. He was raised by the wolf goddess Lupa and her pack, then later lived at Camp Jupiter. Jason is extremely powerful as he inherited many special powers from his father Jupiter like summoning lightning bolts, controlling winds, flying, summoning storm spirits, and creating different types of storms like thunderstorms, rainstorms, and hurricanes. Jason was also a master swordsman, spear user, and incredible fighter. After a plan by Hera has him and Percy Jackson swap camps, he and Thalia are reunited in The Lost Hero. Thalia reveals that their mother told her that Jason was dead, and that this was what finally drove her to leave home.

Jason was often described to be attractive. He had blond hair, blue eyes, and a scar above his upper lip due to him attempting to eat a stapler when he was two. Annabeth Chase described him as too "perfect" looking and Percy says he resembles a blond Superman.

By the age of fifteen, he had earned the rank of praetor (leader) and led the legion with his longtime partner, Reyna, who eventually fell in love with him. Jason also coordinated the Roman camp's attack on the Titan force prior to the events of The Lost Hero; he led an assault against Mount Tamalpais/Othrys and defeated the Titan Krios in combat. Jason is described as kind, open-minded, but very rule-abiding and duty-oriented due to his Roman upbringing, though Terminus describes him as a "rule-flouter". However this strict personality slowly began to loosen after his time in Camp Half-Blood with him learning to have fun and live more like a teenager. The Blood of Olympus, Jason becomes the Pontifex Maximus and becomes the bridge between Camp Jupiter and Half-Blood and the Roman and Greek demigods.

Jason's main love interest is Piper Mclean, daughter of Aphrodite, whom he is shown to already be dating in The Lost Hero. The two date throughout their time as the seven, but end up breaking up and going their separate ways.

Jason is later seen attending boarding school in California before he is called to help defeat Caligula by a depowered Apollo. He is killed in battle from a spear stabbing him between his shoulder blades during The Burning Maze by the Roman Emperor Caligula.

==== Hazel Levesque ====
Hazel Levesque is a demigod, a daughter of Pluto and Marie Levesque. She first appears in The Son of Neptune, at Camp Jupiter. It is later revealed that she has returned from the dead, assisted by her half-brother Nico. She grew up in the 1940s in New Orleans, where her mother had a gris-gris shop. When she was born, Pluto offered to grant her mother a wish, but her request for wealth backfired into an ability to control precious metals and gems, which both first view as a curse. Hazel died after Gaea tries to use Hazel's power over earth to resurrect Alcyoneus. When Hazel's mother changes her mind about helping Gaea, Hazel buries herself and her mother under the earth, delaying Alcyoneus' rebirth though killing them both, where she ends up in the Underworld. At some point before The Lost Hero, Nico finds Hazel in the Underworld and since the Doors of Death open. Nico is then able to take Hazel to the world of the living again.

Hazel is described as African American, having cocoa-colored skin, curly cinnamon-brown hair, and golden eyes. Her legion tattoo is described as looking like a cross with curved arms and a head. She eventually learns to manipulate her curse, manipulating precious stones and metals and sensing structures underground. She is an accomplished horse-rider and skilled with a spatha, taming her horse Arion by giving him precious metals. After the Second Gigantomachy, Hazel is promoted to the rank of centurion of the Fifth Cohort, succeeding her boyfriend Frank. During The Tyrant's Tomb, Hazel reveals that she has managed to break her curse with Frank, which is confirmed in The Tower of Nero. In The Tyrant's Tomb, she and Frank team up with Apollo and Meg to protect Camp Jupiter from the emperors Commodus and Caligula as well as the undead king Tarquin.

==== Frank Zhang ====
Frank Zhang, born Fai Zhang (his Chinese name), is a demigod, son of Mars and Emily Zhang, a Chinese-Canadian descendant of a demigod who died during military service in Afghanistan. He is taken care of by his grandmother after his mother's death, and makes his way to Camp Jupiter upon her insistence. Frank's family descends from Periclymenus, a grandson of Poseidon, who had the power to shapeshift. However, his combined power of being a son of Mars and having the ability to shapeshift caused the Fates to tie his life force to a piece of firewood when he was a baby, so if the wood burns up, he will die (as in the ancient Greek legend of Meleager). Eventually, Frank entrusts the firewood to Hazel.

Frank has a meek disposition. As he has been residing in Camp Jupiter for no more than a year, Frank is initially considered a probatio of the Fifth Cohort. In The Son of Neptune, Mars appears, informing Frank that he is his son and is to lead a quest.

Frank was described as "cuddly" and "fuzzy" and with a chubby, babyish face in The Mark of Athena, but in The House of Hades, after summoning the blessing of Mars to defeat a hoard of enemies, he transforms. He is then described as being taller and more muscular, though he is still as sensitive as before, and is embarrassed at his new appearance at first.

Frank burns his stick for the final time in The Tyrant's Tomb to kill Caligula. Despite the stick completely burning, Frank survives, freeing him from his curse. Apollo believes that by taking his fate into his own hands in such a noble way, Frank has created a new fate for himself free of his curse. It is also revealed that his romantic relationship with Hazel has enabled her to break her curse, fulfilling a prophecy that she had received that a descendant of Poseidon would wash away her curse.

In The Tower of Nero, Frank and Hazel are revealed to have become the most efficient praetors the Twelfth Legion has ever had and have been building up New Rome.

==== Coach Hedge ====
Gleeson Hedge is a satyr. He is first mentioned in The Last Olympian as the author of a distress call sent to Grover. Like Grover, Hedge is also a demigod Protector. He disguises himself as a coach at the Wilderness School to escort Piper and Leo (and later, Jason) to Camp Half-Blood. He also serves as the adult chaperone for the Argo II and later accompanies the Athena Parthenos to camp. Despite his often warlike and often overly aggressive attitude, Hedge is kind and understanding to campers in need. He enjoys extreme sports and martial arts movies. In The Lost Hero, Hedge falls in love with cloud nymph Mellie and marries her; by the time of The House of Hades, Mellie is pregnant with Chuck, a satyr baby, who is born at the end of The Blood of Olympus.

=== Introduced in The Trials of Apollo ===
==== Apollo / Lester Papadopoulos ====
Apollo, in the mortal form of Lester Papadopoulos, serves as the main protagonist of The Trials of Apollo.

In The Heroes of Olympus, Apollo's Roman descendant Octavian promises the god many things for blessing his prophetic skills, which leads to the Olympians' distraction from the true threat of Gaea, and to the resurgence of Python. As a result, the Delphic Oracle ceases to function, effectively halting demigod quests, and Zeus punishes Apollo. Zeus' punishment consists of making Apollo mortal, though he retains most of his personality and some more minor powers. This punishment is revealed in The Trials of Apollo. In his mortal form, Apollo's name is Lester Papadopoulos. Apollo has to adjust to a life of mortality and questing to regain his former powers and lifestyle.

Following a meeting with two thugs sent by Nero in Manhattan, Apollo encounters Meg, who claims him as her servant until he regains his godhood. Apollo is released by Meg after the revelation of her alliance with his enemy. His quest to become a god again is to liberate the oracles and face down his demons and the brutal mistakes he's made.

As Lester, Apollo is a 16-year-old teenager with curly brown hair, blue eyes, acne, and a "flabby" torso. He is narcissistic, prideful, and arrogant. His mortal transformation makes him empathize with mortals and reaches a higher understanding of the worth of life, the meaning of death, and what it means to be alive. In particular, he grows to care for Meg deeply and resolves to be there for her despite the difficulties involved.

After killing Python in The Tower of Nero, Apollo is reinstated as a god but is changed for the better by his time as a mortal, having grown up and established real relationships with his children and others. He does not define himself sexually but has been in relationships with both females and males.

==== Meg McCaffrey ====
Margaret "Meg" McCaffrey is a daughter of Demeter and the main character in The Hidden Oracle. Her father was murdered by "the Beast" (Emperor Nero) and she was subsequently adopted by Nero, gaslighted into personifying Nero's evil actions as separate from him. Nero taught her the arts of a demigod and gave her a pair of crescent rings which can transform into sickles made of imperial gold, before giving her a task to lure Apollo into the Grove of Dodona.

Meg is described as small and pudgy, with dark hair chopped in a messy pageboy style and black cat-eye glasses with rhinestones in the corners. She is free-spirited and adventurous, inquisitive, and is also confrontational. She poses questions with no subtlety, something that Apollo is annoyed with but later comes to regard as a unique trait. Her abilities as Demeter's daughter allows her to connect better with nature as well as summoning a karpos called Peaches, a power that none of Demeter's other demigod children are known to possess.

Even though she is Demeter's daughter, not Ceres (the Roman manifestation of Demeter) she fights like a Roman, with two swords; one for offense and one for defense. She is also known for her liking of unicorns in The Tyrant's Tomb.

==== Hemithea ====
Hemithea, known as "Emmie", is a retired Hunter of Artemis and caretaker of the Waystation. She lives with her partner, Josephine, also an ex-Hunter, and their daughter Georgia at the Waystation in Indianapolis. She and her sister were granted immortality by Apollo after escaping from the wrath of their father, King Staphylus. She then joined the Hunters of Artemis and fell in love with fellow hunter Josephine, so sometime in the 1980s, Josephine and Emmie gave up their immortality to grow old together. In The Dark Prophecy, she saves Calypso, Leo and Apollo from the Blemmyae with crossbow turrets and lets them stay at the Waystation. She comments on the similarities between Calypso and her half-sister Zoë.

==== Triumvirate Holdings ====
Triumvirate Holdings is a company that is led by three beings who are said to be the worst Roman Emperors in history. They force other people to worship them. During the Second Titanomachy, Triumvirate Holdings was responsible for giving Luke (at the time under the influence of Kronos) and his allies the Princess Andromeda, weapons, helicopters, and top human mercenaries. During the Second Gigantomachy, Triumvirate Holdings supplied Octavian with different weapons. Rachel described Triumvirate Holdings to be so rich that they make her father's company "look like a kid's lemonade stand". The trio have divided up North America into three major empires and are hunting for Oracles, which they plan to destroy.

Among the known members of Triumvirate Holdings are:

- Emperor Nero – Nero is a legacy of Apollo. He is the main antagonist of The Hidden Oracle and one of the two main antagonists of The Tower of Nero, alongside Python. The last in the Julio-Claudian dynasty, Nero is infamous for his tyranny and overindulgence in wealth and luxury with little regard to his subjects. He is the deified Roman Emperor, who has survived through the millennia along with two other deified Roman emperors – the Triumvirate. He forms an alliance with Python, who holds Delphi, while he himself controls the other oracles and plans to destroy Dodona. As the Emperor of the East, Nero lives in New York City, where he recruits and trains homeless demigods, and controls the eastern third of North America. He and the other two Roman Emperors have established Triumvirate Holdings. As "the Beast", Nero killed Meg's father, but later adopted and trained her in demigod arts so she could eventually lure Apollo into the Grove of Dodona. After Rhea restores the Grove of Dodona at Camp Half-Blood, Nero tries to force Apollo and Meg to burn the trees; failing at that, he sends a giant statue of himself, the Colossus Neronis, which originally stood in Rome, against Camp Half-Blood and Apollo and the Greek demigods defend the camp against it. He is killed by Apollo in The Tower of Nero and his power absorbed by Python.
- Emperor Commodus – Commodus is the main antagonist of The Dark Prophecy and one of the three main antagonists in The Tyrant's Tomb alongside Caligula and Tarquin. The last in the Nerva-Antonine dynasty, Commodus ascended as emperor at a young age and was known for his good looks and musculature, for which he was nicknamed the "New Hercules". In later life, he became increasingly dictatorial and paranoid as he suspected that people would overthrow him. He also had preferences for gladiatorial battles and would buy slaves and exotic animals to fight to the death. Eventually, Apollo, with whom he had an affair, assassinated him while taking the form of Narcissus, his wrestling partner. As a god, he reigned as the Emperor of the Middle, ruling from a base at Indianapolis. He sends many of his men, including a kidnapped Georgina, to seek the Oracle of Trophonius, as he himself fears the oracle's reputed ability to drive its seekers insane. At the end of The Dark Prophecy, he launches an attack at the Waystation, but is defeated by Apollo and his group. He manages to get away at the last second, having been blinded by Apollo's brief revelation of his true form. Later, Commodus joins forces with Caligula and Tarquin to destroy Camp Jupiter but ends up being killed by Apollo again.
- Emperor Caligula – Caligula is the main antagonist of The Burning Maze and one of the three main antagonists in The Tyrant's Tomb alongside Commodus and Tarquin. He was born into the first ruling family of the Roman Empire, conventionally known as the Julio-Claudian dynasty. Caligula was ambushed by his Germani guards which led to his mortal death. Following this incident, he employed the Strix and the Pandai to work for him while his fellow emperors continue to use Germani. Many years later, Apollo and Piper were brought to Caligula by his talking horse Incitatus as Caligula has the Pandai they subdued executed. Before he can have Meg and Jason executed, Caligula is stunned when Apollo threatens to commit suicide. After Apollo stabs himself Caligula sails north with his guards. Medea meets with Caligula and advises that performs a ritual before Apollo dies. Caligula later fights Jason and Tempest on the back of Incitatus where he manages to kill Jason. After making sure that he is dead, Caligula sets sail for the Bay Area. Later, Caligula joins forces with Commodus and Tarquin to destroy Camp Jupiter. Caligula ends up being killed by Frank who apparently sacrifices himself to destroy the emperor by burning up his firewood representing Frank's lifeline. To much surprise, Frank survives the experience and is left with his life no longer tied to the wood.
- King Tarquin – Tarquin is one of the three main antagonists in The Tyrant's Tomb alongside Commodus and Caligula. Tarquin is the last king of Rome and is depicted as a zombie. He participated in the Battle of San Francisco Bay where he targeted the Sibylline Books. Tarquin was killed by Hazel and Diana who stabbed him in the chest and shot him in the head with an arrow respectively.

=== Greek-Roman deities ===
==== The Olympians ====
Though not all the gods who appear in Rick Riordan's novels are truly Olympians (that is, gods who live on Mount Olympus), all Greek and Roman gods are generally considered to be a subset of the Olympians. As such, most characters in the series refer to these immortals generally as the "Olympian gods", to distinguish them from the Greco-Roman primordial gods and Titans.

- Zeus/Jupiter – The King of the Gods and the most powerful Olympian by far, Zeus is most prominent in The Lightning Thief but has several roles throughout the rest of Percy Jackson & the Olympians. Zeus is shown prominently throughout the series to be extremely narcissistic, paranoid and hypocritical. In The Lost Hero, under the influence of Khione, Zeus forbids contact between gods and mortals and closes off Olympus (against the influence of Khione), although he indirectly helps the protagonists several times on their quests. As the primary Olympian god, his demigod children reside in Camp Half-Blood's biggest cabin, Cabin 1, although the only person who resides there at the end of The Heroes of Olympus is Jason. In the film adaptation, Zeus is portrayed by Sean Bean. In the TV series, he is originally portrayed by Lance Reddick in season one as one of his final roles before his untimely death and later portrayed by Courtney B. Vance in season two. When Percy gives Zeus the Master Bolt to him while stating that Kronos had orchestrated its theft, Zeus still plans to continue the war with Poseidon. As Percy states that Ares turned on him when "someone stronger showed up" and asks what the other Olympians will think of him when Kronos returns to put him back in his place, Zeus tries to strike Percy with the Master Bolt only for Poseidon to intervene and surrender. As Zeus plans to have Athena set a meeting with the other Olympians about Kronos' threat after a brief discussion with Poseidon, he leaves telling Poseidon to make sure he never sees Percy again. In season two, Zeus saved Thalia from the Furies. When Thalia declined to be treated as a weapon to her father, Zeus turned her into a tree.
- Hera/Juno – Hera/Juno is the Queen of the Gods. In The Titan's Curse, she helped Percy and the others on their quest in The Battle of the Labyrinth. As Juno in The Lost Hero, she was kidnapped by Gaea, and contacted Jason to rescue her. Previously as Juno, she had sneaked out of Olympus and switched Percy and Jason to try to unite the Roman and Greek demigods, going against the wishes of Zeus as part of a plan to defeat Gaea. Her cabin in Camp Half-Blood is Cabin 2, the second biggest in the camp. Because she does not have demigod children, it is empty. In the film adaptation, Hera is portrayed by Erica Cerra. In the TV series, she is portrayed by Ming-Na Wen.
- Poseidon/Neptune – Poseidon/Neptune is the god of the sea, earthquakes, and horses and is the brother of Zeus and Hades. In The Lightning Thief, he is suspected of having stolen Zeus' master bolt with Percy's help which nearly started a war between Zeus and Poseidon. Percy is proven innocent after Percy recovers it from Ares. He is later present when Percy returns the master bolt to Zeus. Poseidon would later extend an invitation to Tyson to assist him at his underwater forge. Poseidon later fights Oceanus in the underwater front of the Second Titan War. He remains there in The Last Olympian while the other Olympians fight Typhon, until Percy convinces him that his power is necessary to defeat Typhon. He was last seen fighting the Giants in the Second Gigantomachy alongside Percy and the other gods and demigods and mentioned Kymopoleia to the other gods as his daughter after Percy and Jason reported meeting her. Though he is referred to as Neptune in the sequels of Percy Jackson & the Olympians when the Greeks and Romans are united, he has yet to appear in Roman form. His cabin in Camp Half-Blood is Cabin 3 in which Percy is the sole permanent occupant. In The Lightning Thief film, Poseidon is portrayed by Kevin McKidd. In the musical, he is portrayed by Jonathan Raviv. In the TV series, he is portrayed by Toby Stephens. He is first seen in a flashback talking to Sally where he advised her not to take him to Camp Half-Blood yet. Poseidon shows up in person to prevent Zeus from striking Percy by "surrendering". In season two, Poseidon appears in a dream that Percy has after Thalia's emergence from her tree. While voicing his knowledge of the prophecy to Percy, Poseidon invites Tyson to join him at his underwater forge while telling Percy that he's still needed at Camp Half-Blood.
- Hades/Pluto – Hades/Pluto is the god of the Underworld and brother of Zeus and Poseidon. He is an isolationist who distances himself constantly from other gods because they do the same to him, primarily out of fear. They continuously underestimate Hades who is in fact a very honorable and fatherly individual. He is the father of Nico and Bianca as Hades, and Hazel as Pluto. Hades teleported Sally Jackson to the Underworld during the Minotaur's attack on her and Percy. Percy, Annabeth, and Grover assumed that he was the culprit behind the Master Lightning Bolt's theft only to find out that he was not and that his Helm of Darkness was also stolen. After Percy defeated Ares, he gave the Helm of Darkness to the Furies for them to return to Hades. He returned Sally to the living afterwards. After the Second Titanomachy, Hades is granted Cabin 13 which is populated by Nico and is given a throne on Mount Olympus. In The Lightning Thief film, Hades is portrayed by Steve Coogan and is depicted as having a fiery winged demon form. In the TV series, Hades is portrayed by Jay Duplass.
- Demeter/Ceres – Demeter/Ceres is the goddess of agriculture. She appears alongside her daughter Persephone in The Last Olympian when they participate in the battle against the Titans. Demeter's cabin in Camp Half-Blood is Cabin 4. In The Lightning Thief film, Demeter is portrayed by Stefanie von Pfetten. In the TV series, she is portrayed by Jennifer Beals.
- Ares/Mars – Ares/Mars is the god of war and is the son of Zeus and Hera and the father of Deimos, Phobos, Eros, Clarisse (as Ares), and Frank (as Mars). Ares is a callous bully who is driven by either greed, aggression, violence or by the promise of violence. However, as Mars, he dislikes war without reason and is one of the more important Roman gods. He is however still a bully and is all for killing the Greeks. Percy first encounters Ares in The Lightning Thief, in which he drives a black Harley-Davidson motorcycle with flame decals and a leather seat made from human skin. Percy defeats Ares in a sword fight near the climax of the book. Before fleeing in his divine form, Ares curses Riptide to fail Percy when he needs it the most. Cabin 5 in Camp Half-Blood is the home of Ares' demigod children; it is said to be surrounded by all kinds of warfare apparatus, including spikes. In The Lightning Thief film, Ares is portrayed by Ray Winstone. In the musical, he is portrayed by James Hayden Rodriguez. In the TV series, he is portrayed by Adam Copeland. Unlike the book series, Ares does not curse Riptide and states that Percy has made an enemy for life.
- Athena/Minerva – Athena/Minerva is the goddess of wisdom and the daughter of Zeus and Metis. She first appears in The Titan's Curse, where she dislikes Percy and his relationship with her daughter, and votes to execute Percy due to his crucial role in the fate of Olympus. She then argues that it was the most logical and wise choice. As Minerva, she is a scatterbrain and lost. She hates the Romans for reducing her to that and tells her descendants to kill the Romans. She also leads her best children to the Athena Parthenos, although Aphrodite believes it to be subconscious, as Athena does not know where it is. After an argument between Minerva and Annabeth, she revokes the magical properties of her daughter's Yankees cap, but Athena eventually restores them to help against Serapis. In The Chalice of the Gods, Athena helps Percy on his quest to return Ganymede's stolen chalice, which Annabeth takes as a sign that her mother has finally accepted their relationship. Her color scheme is gray, and her cabin in Camp Half-Blood is Cabin 6. In the film adaptation, Athena is portrayed by Melina Kanakaredes. In the TV series, Athena is portrayed by Andra Day. She was mentioned in season one where Annabeth translate Echidna's language stating that Athena has sanctioned Echidna to enter her sanctuary after Medusa's head was sent to Mount Olympus. Athena first appears in Annabeth's Siren-induced hallucination during season two where she saves her from the Sirens.
- Apollo – Apollo is the god of the sun, light, music, truth, and healing. His Greek children live in Cabin 7 in Camp Half-Blood. He serves as a supporting character in Percy Jackson & the Olympians and The Heroes of Olympus, and is the protagonist of The Trials of Apollo as a mortal named Lester Papadopoulos. Apollo first appears in The Titan's Curse when he transports a group of demigods and Hunters at the behest of his twin sister Artemis. Later, he assists the quest group in rescuing Artemis from the Titans, even though doing so has been forbidden by Zeus. At the end of The Last Olympian, Apollo chooses Rachel as his new Pythia. After the war in the second series, the furious Zeus punishes Apollo with mortality for his failure to identify Gaea as a threat. He had to undergo different trials in the form of Lester in order to redeem himself. In The Lightning Thief film, he is portrayed by Dimitri Lekkos. In the TV series, he is portrayed by Hubert Smielecki.
- Artemis/Diana – Artemis/Diana is the goddess of the moon, animals, youth, and hunting. She is the daughter of Zeus and Leto and the twin sister of Apollo. Artemis, true to her vows, is distrusting of men, discourages the companionship or value of men, and encourages maidenhood. As a result, she has no demigod children, but recruits Hunters who serve as her companions and attendants. Cabin 8 is her honorary home at Camp Half-Blood, but because she is a virgin, it is populated only when her Hunters come to visit. Her Roman counterpart Diana only appears in The Tyrant's Tomb when Apollo summons her to help New Rome. Diana kills Tarquin and heals her brother's zombie infection. In The Lightning Thief film, Artemis is portrayed by Ona Grauer. In the TV series, she is portrayed by Dafne Keen.
- Hephaestus/Vulcan – Hephaestus/Vulcan is the gods' blacksmith, and the father of Charles Beckendorf and Leo as Hephaestus. At Camp Half-Blood, Cabin 9 is dedicated to him. He acts as a major ally of Percy in The Battle of the Labyrinth. In The Lost Hero, he defies Zeus by speaking to Leo through his dreams and delivers the head of the mechanical dragon Festus for use as the figurehead for the Argo II. In The Lightning Thief film, Hephaestus is portrayed by Conrad Coates. Timothy Omundson portrays Hephaestus in the TV series. Unlike the book series, Hephaestus shows up early where he finds Annabeth in his amusement park hideout with Percy trapped in the same throne that Hera was once trapped in. After agreeing to free Percy, he allows them to claim Ares' shield as Hephaestus tells Annabeth that he'll put in a good word to Athena.
- Aphrodite/Venus – Aphrodite/Venus is the goddess of love and beauty. She first appeared briefly in The Titan's Curse. Her appearance shifts constantly, always becoming more beautiful. Cabin 10 at Camp Half-Blood is the home of her demigod children. In The Lightning Thief, Aphrodite is portrayed by Serinda Swan.
- Hermes/Mercury – Hermes/Mercury is the messenger of the gods, and the god of travelers and thieves. He is the son of Zeus and Maia. In the Percy Jackson & the Olympians, Hermes helps Percy, hoping that he will be able to redeem Luke. All unclaimed demigods were packed into Hermes' cabin, Cabin 11, because Hermes welcomed all travelers until each god got their own cabin. In the film adaptations, Hermes is portrayed by Dylan Neal in the first film and by Nathan Fillion in the second film. In the TV series, he is portrayed by Lin-Manuel Miranda. Unlike the book series, Hermes is found at the Lotus Hotel and Casino where Percy and Annabeth try to get him to help them get into the Underworld. He was reluctant to help them due to an event that strained his relationship with Luke and that Poseidon advised him not to help anymore people get into the Underworld. After having found that Annabeth pickpocketed him, he leaves instructions and a map for them on his car. In season two, Hermes was sent by Poseidon to provide items to Percy in his quest to the Sea of Monsters.
- Dionysus/Bacchus/Mr. D – Dionysus/Bacchus is the god of wine, parties, and madness who is the son of Zeus and Semele. He was made the head of Camp Half-Blood for 100 years as punishment for pursuing "an off-limits wood nymph" romantically twice and forbidden and banned from drinking wine or growing grapes, causing Dionysus to be seen drinking Diet Coke as a substitute. He is portrayed as a cynical and unfriendly misanthrope who does not appear to have much respect for other beings except for Ariadne. He is a powerful god, but his powers are shown the least throughout the series. He has two demigod sons named Castor and Pollux, both of whom are the sole inhabitants of Cabin 12. As Bacchus, Dakota is his son. Dionysus was once a demigod who was made into a god. His seat on the Olympian Council originally belonged to Hestia who decided to abdicate it after Dionysus was first made into a god to avoid conflict. Dionysus hates his job and has a low opinion of demigods, likening them to Theseus and his abandonment of Ariadne. However, he is shown to be kind and helpful toward demigods on a few occasions, saving Percy and his friends from the Manticore in The Titan's Curse, curing Chris Rodriguez's madness in The Battle of the Labyrinth, and giving Nico counseling sessions in The Trials of Apollo following Jason's death. He typically refers to Percy by variations on his real name, only ever calling him Percy a few times in the series, usually only in extremely serious moments. In The Last Olympian, his 100-year sentence is shortened to only 50 years following the defeat of Kronos due to good behavior. In The Mark of Athena, Bacchus appeared to help the Heroes against two of the giants once they prove themselves to him. In The House of Hades, the giant Clytius stated that it took the combined forces of Dionysus and Hercules when they were both demigods to defeat him the last time. In The Tower of Nero, following his own punishment, Apollo suggested to Dionysus that Zeus might have a greater purpose to forcing Dionysus to run Camp Half-Blood and not to lose hope. In The Court of the Dead, Dionysus broke down in tears when his faded mother Semele was restored. He told Nico not to tell any of the campers about it. Dionysus is portrayed by Luke Camilleri in the first film and by Stanley Tucci in the second film. In the musical, he is portrayed by George Salazar. In the TV series, he is portrayed by Jason Mantzoukas.
- Hestia/Vesta – Hestia/Vesta is the goddess of the hearth and home. Like Artemis, she swore a vow of chastity so no conflict can spring up about her allegiance. As a result, she does not have any demigod children. Hestia gives up her golden throne on Olympus to Dionysus/Bacchus to keep the peace on the Olympian council, making the number of male and female gods unbalanced with seven men and five women. She is the title character of The Last Olympian, where she helps Percy figure out how to defeat Kronos. During the final battle, Hestia intervenes briefly to destroy her father's scythe after Percy knocks it into Hestia's hearth, she briefly appearing amidst the flames to give Kronos a disapproving look. She is described as preferring the shape of a young and softspoken girl with brown hair. She is also one of the only gods who has not tampered with the lives of Percy and his friends. In The Lightning Thief, Percy spotted her on his first day of camp, but mistook her for a regular young girl.

==== Minor Greco-Roman gods ====
- Achelous – Achelous is a river god with the face of a man and the head of a bull. He had previously fought with Hercules where Hercules removed one of Achelous' horns; in The Mark of Athena, his other horn is removed by Piper and becomes a cornucopia.
- Aeolus – Aeolus is the god of the wind. In The Last Olympian, he manipulates the winds to form a barrier around Olympus protect it from the Titans. In The Lost Hero, he is portrayed as frenetic and unbalanced by attempting to fill all the requests of the gods and hopes to be made god of the wind.
- Amphitrite/Salacia – Amphitrite/Salacia is the Queen of the Sea and wife of Poseidon/Neptune. She appears in one scene of The Last Olympian and is described as a beautiful goddess wearing armor with black hair and small horns resembling crab claws.
- Anemoi – The four wind gods.
  - Boreas/Aquilon – Boreas/Aquilon is the god of the north wind and winter. He first appears in The Lost Hero when Jason, Piper, and Leo ask for assistance. He has two immortal children called the Boreads and is the father of Khione.
    - Khione – Khione is the goddess of snow and is the daughter of Boreas and sister of the Boreads. She first appears in The Lost Hero when she betrays Jason, Piper, and Leo to the forces of Gaea. In The House of Hades, she attacks the Argo II and banishes Leo to Ogygia before she is defeated by the combined forces of Piper and Festus.
    - The Boreads – The Boreads are the sons of Boreas and the brothers of Khione. Calais is depicted as a big simpleton who struggles with words that have more than two syllables, while Zethes is shown to maintain an 1980s hairstyle. In The Lost Hero, the Boreads are seen with Boreas. In The House of Hades, Khione and the Boreads attack the Argo II. The three of them are defeated when Piper charmspeaks Festus to life. Piper also takes one of the Boreads' celestial bronze swords for her own use.
  - Notus/Auster – Notus/Auster is the god of the south wind and summer. He appears in The House of Hades when the damaged Argo II is docked at his palace for several days. The god is depicted as switching often between his Greek and Roman forms, causing a great deal of frustration for Jason in their negotiations. He eventually encourages Jason to simply take what he wants and to choose between being Greek or Roman, at which point the god settles on the form of Notus due to Jason's choice of Greek. Notus then lends the demigods four venti to tow their damaged ship to Malta.
  - Zephyrus/Favonius – Zephyrus/Favonius is the god of the west wind and spring. He appears in The House of Hades. In The Hidden Oracle, Apollo suspects that Zephyrus gives him aid against the Colossus Neronis after accepting Apollo's apology to him.
  - Eurus/Vulturnus – Eurus/Vulturnus is the god of the east wind and autumn.
- Asclepius/Vejovis – Asclepius/Vejovis is the god of healing and is the son of Apollo and Phoebus. In The Blood of Olympus, Asclepius is first mentioned by Apollo on Delos, as the only person to have ever successfully cured death. Apollo gives Leo, Frank, and Hazel his location in Epidaurus. Piper, Leo, and Jason later meet Asclepius in the Asclepion. He quickly diagnoses Jason with myopia and gives him a pair of glasses. Later, he uses the Pylosian mint and the Makhai to formulate the physician's cure and gives the trio instructions on its use which allows Festus to resurrect Leo after his death.
- Enyo/Bellona – Enyo/Bellona is the goddess of war, who is the mother of Hylla and Reyna as Bellona. Though she is never seen in the series, she indirectly helps Reyna to kill Orion by empowering her with her strength.
- Britomartis – Britomartis is the goddess of hunting and fishing nets. In The Dark Prophecy, she encounters Apollo, Leo, and Calypso at the Waystation where she tasks them to retrieve her pet gryphons, Heloise and Abelard, as payment for the secret route to the lair of Commodus. Later, she contacts the Hunters of Artemis to serve as backup for the protection of Waystation. Britomartis also jump-starts Calypso's lost magic.
- Deimos – Deimos is the god of terror. A son of Ares, he appears in "Percy Jackson and the Stolen Chariot", where he torments Clarisse, forcing her and Percy to cooperate to defeat him. In The Blood of Olympus, he helps to defeat the giant Mimas.
- Delphin/Delphinus – Delphin/Delphinus is the god of dolphins and is one of Poseidon's lieutenants. He was seen briefly during a war council meeting in Poseidon's palace in The Last Olympian in the shape of a dolphin.
- East River – East River is a river god who personifies the river in New York. East River only appears in The Last Olympian when he sinks Titan ships coming to attack Olympus for half a sand dollar given to him by Percy.
- Elpis/Spes – Elpis/Spes is the goddess of hope. She remains in Pandora's pithos as the only thing for humans to keep when other evils were released to the world. In The Last Olympian, the pithos is given by Percy to Hestia by the reasoning that hope remains the safest in hearth. In The Blood of Olympus, Gaea times her awakening to coincide with the Feast of Spes, a Roman festival honoring the goddess.
- Eris/Discordia – Eris/Discordia is the goddess of chaos and the daughter of Nyx. In The House of Hades, Percy and Annabeth encounter Eris alongside Nyx and Eris' siblings near the Mansion of Night.
- Eros/Cupid – Eros/Cupid is the god of love and is the son of Aphrodite/Venus and Ares/Mars. In The House of Hades, Jason and Nico convince Cupid to give them Diocletian's Scepter.
- Ganymede – Ganymede is the cupbearer of the gods. He appears in The Sea of Monsters as part of a public service announcement advising users of the Gray Sisters' taxi service to use the seat belt. In The Chalice of the Gods, Ganymede's chalice is stolen by Geras and he enlists Percy's help to get it back. He is depicted as a beautiful teen, but one who is stuck with all of his anxiety, self-doubts, and fears forever while retaining Zeus' attention and the other gods' scorn. In The Sea of Monsters film, Ganymede is portrayed by Richard Yearwood.
- Geras – Geras is the god of old age and the son of Nyx. In The House of Hades, Geras is among the children of Nyx that encounter Percy and Annabeth near the Mansion of Night. In The Chalice of the Gods, he steals Ganymede's chalice. Percy wins the chalice back by embracing Geras and in so doing, old age, mortality, and everything that comes with it which earns him Geras' respect.
- Harpocrates – Harpocrates is the god of silence. He was imprisoned by Triumvirate Holdings and used to silence all demigod communications. After being freed by Apollo, Reyna, and Meg, he wills himself out of existence to help defeat his captors and save Camp Jupiter, bringing an end to the communications blackout. However, it takes months to fade fully with demigod communications only being fully restored by The Sun and the Star three months later. It is revealed that he was once an incarnation of the Egyptian god Horus, but Greek belief in him as a separate entity had turned Harpocrates into a minor Greek-Egyptian hybrid deity.
- Hebe/Juventas – Hebe/Juventas is the goddess of youth. She is the daughter of Zeus and Hera and wife of Heracles. Hebe is amongst the minor gods who allied themselves with the Titans. After the war, she is awarded Cabin 18 in Camp Half-Blood. In The Chalice of the Gods, she is one of the suspects for the theft of Ganymede's chalice, but she is ultimately cleared of any wrongdoing.
- Hecate – Hecate is the goddess of magic. She was an ally of Kronos in Percy Jackson & the Olympians, but supports the gods against Gaea. Her minions are the empousai and her daughter is Circe. After the Titans are defeated, Hecate reconciles with Olympus and is granted Cabin 20 at Camp Half-Blood for her children. In The House of Hades, she reveals that she was the one who had led Hazel's mother to the spell that had summoned Pluto. Hecate teaches Hazel how to use magic and helps to guide the Argo II to Epirus. At the Doors of Death, Hecate teams up with Jason, Leo, Frank, Piper, and Hazel to defeat the giant Clytius, the bane of magic.
- Hudson River – Hudson River is a river god who personifies the river in New York. He only appears in The Last Olympian where he sinks Titan ships coming to attack Olympus for half a sand dollar given to him by Percy.
- Hypnos/Somnus – Hypnos/Somnus is the god of sleep the son of Erebus and Nyx and the father of Morpheus and Clovis, the latter of whom is his demigod child in Camp Half-Blood. He has Cabin 15 at Camp Half-Blood.
- Iris/Arcus – Iris/Arcus is the goddess of rainbows. She administers a network of rainbows used by demigods and Olympians to communicate remotely something that is known as Iris Messaging. It is revealed that she does not actually handle much of the Iris Messaging system personally, instead delegating it to her cloud nymph assistant Fleecy. While Iris Messaging works for all demigods, the Romans were unaware of it and as a result, typically do not use the system. She is the mother of the demigod Butch, who makes a small appearance in The Lost Hero, who was the company of Annabeth in finding "the boy with one shoe" which was Jason. After the Second Titanomachy, she is granted Cabin 14 for her demigod children. In The Son of Neptune, she meets Frank, Percy, and Hazel on their quest in finding the missing legion's eagle and is revealed to be one of the very few gods unaffected by the growing split personality problem. She offers Frank advice about his powers and has Fleecy help the Romans send an Iris Message for the first time. She is also mentioned to be an old friend of Chiron's in The Sea of Monsters and allows him to listen in on Percy and his friends communications, enabling Chiron to rescue them from trouble just in the nick of time. In The Trials of Apollo, Triumvirate Holdings use Harpocrates to block demigod communications, including Iris Messaging as part of their plans. After Harpocrates' death in The Tyrant's Tomb, Iris Messaging is finally restored to a degree, allowing Apollo to use it as part of a ceremony to summon Diana for help. However, as revealed in The Tower of Nero, communication still remains spotty a month later as the block slowly fades and Iris Messaging is still down between the East and West Coasts of North America due to the distance. In The Sun and the Star, taking place two months later and three months after Harpocrates' death, Iris Messaging has finally been fully restored.
- Janus – Janus is the Roman god of gates, doorways, beginnings, and endings. He appears as a minor character in The Battle of the Labyrinth. He has two faces, and each face seems to think the exact opposite of what the other face thinks. After harassing Annabeth, he is sent away by Hera. In Percy's dreams, he learns that Janus had influenced Daedalus to allow his nephew Perdix to die.
- Kymopoleia – Kymopoleia is the goddess of sea storms and daughter of Poseidon. She is betrothed to Briares, whom she resents. In The Blood of Olympus, Kymopoleia works with Polybotes to hinder the demigods while sailing through the Aegean Sea after feeling abandoned by her father. She is convinced by Jason to switch sides, because she wants to be feared and respected. Together, they kill Polybotes. She is nicknamed "Kym" by Percy who attempts to get her to give her husband a second chance, Percy having previously met and befriended Briares. Before they part ways, Kym gives her half-brother and Jason an important clue about defeating Gaea.
- Lares – Lares are household gods and ancestor spirits. They are guardians at Camp Jupiter.
  - Cato – Cato is a Lar. In The Son of Neptune, Cato is seen at the senate meeting where Frank is made a Centurion.
  - Marcus – Marcus is a Lar. In The Court of the Dead, he is mentioned to be helping Will with his archery. Frank tells Will that Marcus was part of the auxilia in ancient times from a famed battalion of Roman archers, meaning that Will was getting lessons from a well renowned archer during his era.
  - Vitellius – Vitellius is a Lar and is a descendant of Asclepius. In The Son of Neptune, he was first seen when Hazel was introducing Percy to him. In The Court of the Dead, he acts as a drill instructor for the Fifth Cohort.
- Laverna – Laverna is the Roman goddess of thieves, cheats, and liars. She appears as a servant of Pirithous, Tantalus, and Mary Tudor in The Court of the Dead, abducting the mythics from Camp Jupiter on their behalf.
- Morpheus/Somnia – Morpheus/Somnia is the god of dreams and son of Hypnos. He is among the minor gods that appears as an ally of Kronos in The Last Olympian. He puts the entire city of New York and Grover to sleep during the battle. Following Kronos' defeat, Morpheus is among the minor gods that reconcile with Olympus.
- Melinoë – Melinoë is the goddess of ghosts, who lives in the underworld. She appears only in "Percy Jackson and the Sword of Hades", where she scares people by showing them the ghosts of deaths they regret.
- Mithras – Mithras is the Roman god of warriors. In The Mark of Athena, he is mentioned by Aphrodite when she talks about how Athena was changed by the Romans. Later, Annabeth stumbles on a cult of ghosts dedicated to him, who look down on her for being a girl. She realizes everything they are talking about from pictures, statues, and the corpses of other dead children of Athena in the cult's chamber and manages to escape. In The Tower of Nero, it is mentioned that he was originally a Persian god who was adopted by the Romans. One of Mithras' sacred creatures is used by Nero who was a part of Mithras' cult when he was a Roman emperor.
- Nike/Victoria – Nike/Victoria is the goddess of victory. She is on the Athena Parthenos in Athena's hand. Her children are in Cabin 17 at Camp Half-Blood. Leo, Hazel, Frank, and Percy meet her in The Blood of Olympus and later kidnap her as she has been driven insane by the split between the gods' Greek and Roman selves, risking her giving victory to the giants instead. She is imprisoned aboard the Argo II and is tricked into giving the demigods information on the physician's cure. Leo is mentioned to have discussed his plan to defeat Gaea with her as well. After the split is healed, Leo releases her from the ship and she resumes her role as Zeus' charioteer in the final battle with the giants, proclaiming victory to the gods.
- Nemesis – Nemesis is the goddess of vengeance and mother of the late Ethan. After the Second Titanomachy, she is granted Cabin 16 for her demigod children. Nemesis is seen in The Mark of Athena where she gives Leo a cursed fortune cookie. In The Sun and the Star, it is revealed that she saved Nico's life when he first fell into Tartarus. She later appears alongside her siblings Hypnos and Epiales, but does not take part in Nyx's battle against Nico, Will, Bob and Small Bob. Nemesis is the first to turn against Nyx, declaring that she is also the goddess of balance and Nyx's actions are unjust. Nemesis helps restrain Nyx so that the group can escape, provides them with as much good luck as she can and directs them to sail the River Acheron back to the Underworld in order to escape. However, Nemesis warns the demigods that luck will not be on their side if they ever return to Tartarus, something that they are all too happy to swear that they will not do.
- Palaemon – Palaemon is the god of sharks and one of Poseidon's lieutenants in the war against Oceanus.
- Pan/Faunus – Pan/Faunus was the god of the wild and patron of all satyrs. Pan had been missing for over 2,000 years and the satyrs sought him fervently. After Percy and his friends find Pan in The Battle of the Labyrinth, he dies peacefully and releases his spirit to Percy, Grover, Rachel, and Annabeth. As a result, Grover inherits some of his powers, instinctively displaying Pan's unique Panic cry to defeat an attacking army of monsters. In The Last Olympian, Grover carries on the legacy of Pan by sending teams of satyrs to clean up the world.
- Persephone/Proserpine – Persephone/Proserpine is the goddess of spring and the queen of the Underworld. She is the wife of Hades and the daughter of Demeter and Zeus. Hades only allows her to visit Demeter in the spring and summer and remain in the Underworld in the fall and winter. She is said to be able to "soften" Hades and make him more merciful. Unlike most minor gods, she sides with Olympus during the war against the Titans. In the film adaptation, Persephone is portrayed by Rosario Dawson.
- Phobos – Phobos is the god of fear. A son of Ares, he appears in "Percy Jackson and the Stolen Chariot", where he tormented Clarisse along with his brother. He has the power to show people their greatest fears, but Percy and Clarisse cooperate to defeat him. In The Blood of Olympus, a statue of Phobos is used by Piper to kill Mimas which fulfills the requirement of "one god and one demigod cooperating" in killing giants.
- Pomona – Pomona is the Roman goddess of plenty. She is not seen in person, but a statue of her speaks in The Last Olympian, becoming irritated when she is mistaken for Demeter by Percy, throwing bronze apples at Percy and Will.
- Semele – Semele is the mother of Dionysus. She is a mortal princess who was turned into a goddess by Zeus after her death. She appears in The Court of the Dead as an eidolon who has mostly forgotten her past, but works with the Greek and Roman demigods to investigate the disappearance of the other mythics. Semele is later restored to corporeal form by Hecate and reunites with her son, explaining that after being mostly forgotten, she had begun to fade from existence, similar to Pan.
- Terminus – Terminus is the Roman god of boundaries. In The Son of Neptune, he is portrayed as obsessive-compulsive and obsessed with order. He guards the city limits of New Rome in the form of a number of statues of himself and often irritates Percy during his time in New Rome. When Polybotes attacks the camp, Percy convinces Terminus to help him kill the giant as a giant can only be killed by a demigod and a god working together. After defeating Polybotes, Percy smashes him in the nose with Terminus' head, causing the giant to disintegrate. Terminus subsequently relieves Percy of any further inspections by the god. In The Mark of Athena, he confronts the Argo II when it arrives. In The Tyrant's Tomb, Terminus protects his young assistant Julia during the Battle of San Francisco Bay. After Julia's parents are both killed in the attack, it is stated that Terminus intends to adopt the young girl himself. In The Court of the Dead, Terminus works with the Greek and Roman demigods in investigating the disappearance of mythics from Camp Jupiter. Terminus is the one who identifies Laverna as the culprit and works with Will and the Coco Puffs to force her to retreat.
- Thanatos/Letus – Thanatos/Letus is the god of death and a lieutenant of Hades. In The Son of Neptune, the forces of Gaea capture Thanatos, allowing their dead allies to quickly return to life. He resumes his duties after being rescued by Percy, Hazel, and Frank.
- Tiberinus – Tiberinus is a river god who appears to Annabeth in The Mark of Athena. He guided her to the beginning of the Roman leg of her quest for the Athena Parthenos. To Annabeth, he looks exactly like Gregory Peck.
  - Rhea Silvia – Rhea Silvia is a former Vestal Virgin who mothered Romulus and Remus, the founders of Rome. She was made an immortal and wife of Tiberinus after she was given a death sentence for breaking her chastity vow. In The Mark of Athena, Rhea Silvia and Tiberinus give advice to Annabeth about the location of the Athena Parthenos. She is described as looking like Audrey Hepburn.
- Triptolemus – Triptolemus is the god of farming who is associated with Demeter. He was once a mortal prince who assisted Demeter after Persephone was taken to the Underworld and was eventually made into a minor god by her as a reward. In The Mark of Athena, Frank, Hazel and Nico seek him out on the advice of Hecate. Due to his hatred for Hades, Triptolemus turns Nico into a corn plant and refuses to heal Hazel's poisoning, but he eventually makes a deal with Frank to help if Frank can obtain him a new serpent for his chariot. After Frank succeeds, the god restores Nico and heals Hazel before giving them an antidote to the poison that they will have to drink to enter the House of Hades. Triptolemus then takes off in his chariot to spread knowledge about agriculture to the world.
- Triton – Triton is a sea god depicted as a merman with two fishtails. He acts arrogant toward Percy, but respects Tyson.
- Tyche/Fortuna – Tyche/Fortuna is the goddess of fortune, who was awarded Cabin 19 at Camp Half-Blood after the Second Titan War. Her Roman counterpart Fortuna is celebrated by Camp Jupiter in the "Feast of Fortuna" on June 24 every year to decide what fortune that would befall the camp.

=== Primordial deities ===
The primordial deities are the deities that came before the Titans and the Olympians came into existence. Among the known primordial deities are:

- Gaea/Terra – Gaea/Terra is the embodiment of Earth who and the primary antagonist of The Heroes of Olympus. Gaea is the wife of Ouranos, and mother of the Titans, the Elder Cyclopes, the Hekatonkheires, the Giants, and Antaeus. She is the grandmother of the Olympians, whose rule she resents. As of The Son of Neptune, she remains sleeping in the ground, but retains some consciousness and influence. Like Kronos, she commands an army of mythological figures and monsters dissatisfied with the Olympians. During The Blood of Olympus, she is defeated by Leo, Piper, and Jason who lift her into the sky, charm her to sleep and then incinerate her with a mighty blast of fire combined with a shot from an onager by Octavian, a legacy of Apollo and the former augur of Camp Jupiter. As a goddess, she cannot be killed, but her essence is scattered so much she will never able to form a consciousness again, suffering the same fate as her son Kronos.
  - Ourea – Ourea are the primordial gods of the mountains and the children of Gaea. In The House of Hades, some Ourae made up the Apennine Mountains. When the Argo II tried to cross the Apennine Mountains, the Ourae there attacked them with boulders because they were loyal to Gaea. They hurl boulders from their mountaintops and severely damage the Argo II. Leo turns the Argo II away from the Apennine Mountains to come up with a different plan.
- Akhlys – Akhlys is the goddess of misery, and a daughter of Chaos and Night. She is described as a miserable-looking old woman who carries the Aegis shield with Medusa's head carved into it. In The House of Hades, she offers the Death Mist to Percy and Annabeth, but later betrays them by luring them into Nyx's territory and trying to kill them with poison. In anger, Percy manipulates the poison back at Akhlys, causing her to run away in fear. This is the first time that Annabeth sees the darker part of Percy's personality.
- Keto – Keto is a primordial sea goddess and the sister and wife of Phorcys. In The Mark of Athena, Keto appears as a girl named "Kate" who is encountered in Phorcys' aquarium in Atlanta. When Coach Hedge discovers Phorcys' ruse, he frees Percy and Frank after knocking "Kate" out. After Percy, Coach Hedge, and Frank escape from the aquarium, Keto sends a skolopendra (shrimp monster – one of her children) after them.
- Nyx – Nyx is the primordial goddess of night, said to be the oldest being in the universe besides Chaos itself. In The House of Hades, Percy and Annabeth accidentally wander into her territory and try to pose as tourists guided by a brochure that does not mention Nyx. Angered, Nyx shows just how important she is and summons her children, who emit pitch-black darkness that even Nyx herself cannot see through it. Before she can catch them, the couple leave through the Mansion of Night. In The Sun and the Star, taking place over a year later, Nyx works to force Bob the Titan to turn back into Iapetus and seeks to lure Nico into Tartarus to stay, believing that he belongs there due to his own inner darkness. To this end, Nyx works to use Bob's distress call to Nico to lure him back, having briefly met the demigod during his first trip into Tartarus and she creates a number of cacodemons out of Nico's darkness. Nico and his boyfriend Will manage to free Bob and confront Nyx and her children Nemesis, Hypnos, and Epiales. After Nico rejects Nyx's manipulations and releases the cacodemons – symbolically letting go of his own demons in the process – Nyx's children turn on her and restrain the goddess for Nico's group to escape with Hypnos going so far as to burn down her home. Although Nyx breaks free and follows them, she is unable to cross the River Acheron due to being full of pain. Weakened and injured, Nyx is forced to retreat, allowing the demigods to escape from Tartarus with Bob and his pet saber-tooth cat Small Bob.
- Ouranos – Ouranos is the embodiment of the sky and is the husband of Gaea and the father of the Titans. When Gaea gave birth to the Elder Cyclopes and the Hekatonkheires, Ouranos hurled them into the pits of Tartarus because of their ugly appearances. Kronos later castrated Ouranos before cutting him to pieces. Ouranos then cursed Kronos, stating that his child would come to overthrow him just as he had. Not much is mentioned about Ouranos afterwards. In Percy Jackson's Greek Gods, Percy describes Ouranos to be tall and muscular with long dark hair and his skin changing depending on if it is day or night. In The Blood of Olympus, it is revealed that like his wife Gaea and his son Kronos, his essence is scattered so much that he will never able to form a consciousness again. However, in The Hidden Oracle, Apollo states that he can see Ouranos' sleeping face in the sky.
- Phorcys – Phorcys is a primordial sea god and the brother and husband of Keto. In The Mark of Athena, he and Keto run an aquarium in Atlanta, Georgia which contains many rare sea monsters. Following a "VIP" tour, Phorcys traps Percy and Frank (who had turned into a golden koi fish) in a tank to fight each other. This attracts the attention of Coach Hedge, who manages to break the glass tank as they escape promising to return and free the sea creatures that Phorcys has in captivity.
- Styx – Styx is the primordial river goddess of the same name. Taking oaths under Styx' name binds people into a contract; breaching them will mean consequences, oftentimes misery, for them. While multiple people have sworn under Styx' name, Styx herself does not appear until The Dark Prophecy, where she appears in Apollo's vision threatening him with punishment for breaking his oath of not playing music or practicing archery until he regains his immortality. In The Tower of Nero, she appears to Apollo after he defeats Python and asks if he has learned his lesson. Apollo finally realizes that the constant disasters that he had attributed to Styx were actually caused by himself while she had only appeared to berate him for his recklessness in each case. Styx is pleased that Apollo has learned his lesson and vanishes, telling him to hold on to what he has learned.
- Tartarus – While Tartarus is the name of a location where the Titans were imprisoned, there is a primordial god by that name as well. Through Gaea, Tartarus fathered Typhon and the Giants. His real form is the whole Tartarus itself, but he personifies himself in a form that stands several feet tall with a face of a swirling vortex and a voice that makes it seem going inward, rather than outward. In The House of Hades, the personification of Tartarus appears in physical form where he makes a remark about Gaea's awakening. Annabeth and Percy fight Tartarus until Iapetus and Damasen sacrifice themselves so Percy and Annabeth can get out of Tartarus. In The Tower of Nero however, Nico comes to suspect that Iapetus at least survived and that he has been calling out to him from Tartarus for help. In The Sun and the Star, Nico and his boyfriend Will learn that while both Iapetus and Damasen perished fighting Tartarus, they were allowed to regenerate rather than the primordial god destroying them utterly as was previously feared. Although Damasen is still reforming, Nico and Will manage to rescue Iapetus who has been imprisoned by Nyx within Tartarus.

=== Titans ===
The Titans are the children of Gaea and Ouranos. Most of them fought against the gods during the Titanomachy which ended with the Gods winning. Among the featured Titans are:

- Kronos/Saturn – Kronos/Saturn is the king of the Titans, the Lord of Time, and the main antagonist of Percy Jackson & the Olympians. He is the father of all the elder Olympians, as well as Chiron. He fights with a scythe with a six-foot-long magical blade that can harm both gods and mortals and was used to dismember his father Ouranos. Kronos is initially trapped in Tartarus, but eventually escaped to possess Luke. In this form, he personally led the Titan army against Olympus. He was finally defeated by his own host, in fulfillment of the first Great Prophecy. However, Hermes states that Kronos cannot be killed and is instead scattered so thin that he hopefully can never form a consciousness again, the same fate that later befalls his mother Gaea. In The House of Hades, the Titan Koios echoes this, telling Bob that while bits and pieces of Kronos' essence still remain, it is nothing that can ever be put back together again even with the help of the healing powers of Tartarus on monsters. In The Sea of Monsters film, Kronos is voiced by Robert Knepper. He was shown to have a gigantic, demonic body along with superhuman strength and the ability to use parts of his own body as projectile weapons. In the TV series, Kronos is voiced by Nick Boraine. His voice was heard in Percy's dreams.
- Rhea – Rhea is the queen of the Titans, and the mother of the elder Olympians. Unlike Kronos, she loved the children that she gave birth to and even kept Zeus from being eaten. Since Kronos' defeat, Rhea retreated to Upstate New York, but continues to keep in touch with her children. In The Hidden Oracle, Apollo learned that an oracle that Rhea created called the Grove of Dodona is the only one yet to be conquered by Nero. Rhea subsequently appears to Apollo to offer him advice. In The Chalice of the Gods, Zeus hosts a brunch for Rhea on Olympus, forcing Percy to sneak in and return Ganymede's chalice to him. Before the brunch, Rhea had not been on Olympus in a long time.
- Aigaios – Aigaios is the partner of Oceanus. He assisted in the Titans' War against Poseidon. In The Titan's Curse, Tyson reports that Aigaios protected the Princess Andromeda from Poseidon's wrath.
- Atlas – Atlas is the general of the Titan army. He is the father of Calypso and the five Hesperides, one of them being Zoë, who is later disowned because she helped Hercules steal the golden apples. Atlas was imprisoned on the mountaintop of Mount Tamalpais near San Francisco, forever cursed to hold up the sky. He is extremely powerful and strong, even for a Titan. He was the primary antagonist in The Titan's Curse, but is mocked by the other Titans in later books for his failure. He does not participate in Kronos' final assault as Luke and Kronos opted not to release him for his failure. In the TV series, he will be portrayed by Holt McCallany.
- Helios/Sol – Helios/Sol is the Titan of the Sun and the grandfather of Medea. In The Titan's Curse, Apollo mentions that he and Selene faded when the Romans took over and his role was given to him. In The Burning Maze, Medea summons her grandfather from the depths of Tartarus so that she can absorb his power alongside the essence of Apollo and make Caligula the new God of the Sun. Helios is summoned again to fight Apollo, Piper, and Meg. When Medea is defeated, Helios goes supernova. When Apollo encounters Helios in the burning maze, Apollo promises to free him from Medea's control in exchange that he lets them pass. After Piper kills Medea and frees Helios from his prison, Apollo persuades Helios to hold his rage and finally rest while planning to keep his memories alive.
- Hyperion – Hyperion is Titan of the East. He is the father of Helios and Selene. He appears in The Last Olympian, when he is clad in full golden armor and battles Percy. He has all the powers of the Sun. Grover traps Hyperion by turning him into a tree. In The House of Hades, Hyperion is stopped from reforming in Tartarus by his brother Bob the Titan, his tree having apparently died which sent him back to Tartarus. He and Krios are seen later guarding the Doors of Death. Both are obliterated by the physical form of Tartarus as a show of power.
- Koios – Koios is the Lord of the North. In The House of Hades, Koios is briefly seen in Tartarus. He mentions that his daughter Leto had been mistreated by Zeus after "she bore him those fine twins" (Apollo and Artemis). Percy describes Koios as having Apollo's smile and Artemis' eyes.
- Krios – Krios is the Titan of Stars and constellations and Lord of the South. Percy first sees him in a dream during The Last Olympian. He wears armor decorated with glowing stars. In The Lost Hero, Jason claims to have defeated Krios in single combat on Mount Othrys (located on Mount Tamalpais in San Francisco) at the same time of the events happening in The Last Olympian. In The House of Hades Krios is seen with Hyperion guarding the Doors of Death. Both of are obliterated by Tartarus' physical form.
- Leto – Leto is the mother of Apollo and Artemis. In The House of Hades, Koios suggests that she might have been destroyed and sent to Tartarus at some point as he expects her to have finally reformed by now which takes longer for the peaceful Titans. In The Dark Prophecy, Lester has a vision of Leto begging Zeus to lift Apollo's punishment and allow him to return to Mount Olympus. Zeus refuses, stating that Apollo's real test is yet to come.
- Oceanus – Oceanus is the Titan of the Ocean. He is depicted as having the upper body of a muscular man with a long beard and horns and serpentine lower body. He did not fight the Olympians in the original Titanomachy. In The Last Olympian, he assaults Poseidon's forces underwater. Oceanus is incredibly powerful and his intense battle with Poseidon lasts for days and creates storms and tsunamis. After the defeat of Kronos, Oceanus escapes back to the depths of the ocean.
- Prometheus – Prometheus is the Titan of Forethought. Like Oceanus, Prometheus prefers to fight for the more powerful side. He supported the Olympians in the first Titanomachy, but joined with Kronos in the second part because of Zeus' cruel punishment for Prometheus' gift of fire to mankind and a foresight that the Titans would win. This punishment ended only with Hercules, a fact Prometheus uses to justify his claims to love Heroes. He was sent to negotiate Percy and Thalia's surrender during the Battle of Manhattan, offering them the spirit of Elpis. He flees after Kronos' defeat, sending a list of excuses to Mount Olympus. Hermes tells Percy that if Prometheus is smart, he will not show his face again for another few centuries.
- Selene/Luna – Selene/Luna is the Titan of the Moon and the sister of Helios. In The Titan's Curse, Apollo mentions that due to the neglect of the Romans, Helios and Selene were eventually forced to give up their roles to Apollo and Artemis before the two eventually faded from existence. In The Tyrant's Tomb, Apollo is surprised to learn that Ida is a legacy or descendant of Luna due to his belief that the Titan had faded long ago. However, Apollo remembers that he'd thought the same thing about Helios whom he had recently encountered in the Labyrinth after Medea had resurrected the Titan.

=== Gigantes ===
The Gigantes (also called the Great Giants) are giant-like beings that were made by Gaea and Tartarus to overthrow Olympus. They were previously defeated by the gods and Heracles during the Giantomachy. Each was meant to oppose a specific god. They can only be defeated by a god and demigod working together. Most of the Gigantes are described as being very tall with dragon-like legs and shaggy hair.

- Alcyoneus – Alcyoneus is a 40-foot-tall Gigantes. He has rust-colored legs. Hazel almost resurrected him during World War II. She sacrificed herself to stop his resurrection, but she only delays it until the 1980s. Alcyoneus eventually rises in The Son of Neptune. He is invincible as long as he remains in his homeland which after his resurrection is Alaska. Frank, Hazel, and Arion drag him into Canada where Alcyoneus is decapitated by Hazel after being made vulnerable. He is the bane of Hades/Pluto.
- Clytius – Clytius is a 20-foot-tall Gigantes. He has ash-colored legs. Clytius opposes Hecate. He appears in The House of Hades, guarding the living side of the Doors of Death in Epirus. He is defeated by Hecate, Jason, Leo, Piper, Nico, Frank, and Hazel.
- Damasen – Damasen is a 20-foot-tall peaceful Gigantes. He has red legs and appeared in The House of Hades. He had been made to oppose Ares/Mars. Damasen had been exiled to Tartarus as he was peaceful and for refusing to take part in the ancient fight against the gods and Hercules. Percy and Annabeth encountered him in Tartarus when Iapetus brought them to his lair. When the personification of Tartarus arrives near the Doors of Death, Damasen confronted him with Iapetus so that Percy and Annabeth could escape back to the living world. In The Tower of Nero, Iapetus is believed to have survived his presumed demise and is calling out to Nico for help, suggesting that Damasen may have survived as well. In The Sun and the Star, it is revealed that both Iapetus and Damasen were killed in their fight with Tartarus. However, while Iapetus has reformed and is rescued by Nico and Will, Damasen is still regenerating over a year later and the demigods cannot find any sign of him as a result, although they spend the night in his abandoned hut.
- Enceladus – Enceladus is a 30-foot-tall Gigantes with green legs. He was the first Giant to be reawakened in The Heroes of Olympus. He opposes Athena/Minerva. In The Lost Hero, he is killed by Jupiter and Jason as the Giants can only be killed by a god and Hero working together. In The House of Hades, Enceladus re-enters the world through the Doors of Death. He is presumably killed once again during the final battle in The Blood of Olympus.
- Ephialtes and Otis – Ephialtes and Otis are twin 12-foot-tall Gigantes that look somewhat more human than most of their brothers since they each have two snakes for legs, which are usually hidden under their black pants. They both oppose Dionysus/Bacchus. They are awakened in The Mark of Athena by Gaea. Ephialtes and Otis manage to capture Nico and were tasked by Gaea to kill all demigods of the prophecy but two, whom they were to bring to her. They fought Jason and Percy who defeated them with the help of Bacchus. In The House of Hades, Ephialtes and Otis returned to the living world through the Doors of Death. They are presumably killed once again during the final battle in The Blood of Olympus. In The Sun and the Star, they briefly appear in a flashback to when they captured Nico inside Tartarus.
- Hippolytos – Hippolytos is the Messenger of the Gigantes. He is 30-foot-tall and has orange legs. He opposes Hermes/Mercury. He makes a minor appearance in The Blood of Olympus.
- Mimas – Mimas is a 25-foot-tall Gigantes with charcoal-colored legs. He opposes Hephaestus/Vulcan. Mimas makes a minor appearance in The Blood of Olympus, where he tries to kill Annabeth and Piper but he is killed instead with the help of Phobos.
- Orion – Orion is a 20-foot-tall Gigantes who opposes Apollo and Artemis/Diana. In The Heroes of Olympus, Orion is sent by Gaea to hunt down Nico, Reyna, and Coach Hedge throughout their journey of bringing the Athena Parthenos from Greece to New York in attempt to stop the two camps from destroying each other. He nearly catches them numerous times, but they either shadow travel away before he has the chance or are saved by allies (such as the Hunters of Artemis and the Amazons). Orion murders countless Hunters and Amazons, including Phoebe, but escapes. With the help of Athena and her mother Bellona, Reyna killed Orion by strangling him with her cloak which Athena had infused with a part of her shield Aegis.
- Periboia – Periboia is the Princess of the Gigantes who is Porphyrion's daughter. She opposes Aphrodite/Venus. She appears in The Blood of Olympus.
- Polybotes – Polybotes is a 30-foot-tall Gigantes with Komodo dragon-like legs. He opposes Poseidon/Neptune and can turn water to poison. Polybotes attempts to destroy Camp Jupiter in The Son of Neptune with an army of monsters. He is killed by Percy and Terminus. He expresses a particular desire to capture Percy and make him watch as he kills Poseidon. In The House of Hades, Polybotes returns to the living world through the Doors of Death and later succeeds in convincing Kymopoleia in joining the giants. However, he was once again defeated by Jason and Kymopoleia herself after Jason convinced her to turn sides.
- Porphyrion – Porphyrion is the King of the Gigantes. He is 40-foot-tall. with green legs that are described to be the same color as lima beans. He opposes Zeus/Jupiter. Awakened in The Lost Hero, Porphyrion fights Jason and his friends. Hera forces him to retreat, but cannot kill him as only a god and a demigod together can kill a giant. He is killed by Jason and Zeus in The Blood of Olympus.
- Thoon – Thoon is a shriveled wizened Gigantes with white legs. He opposes the Fates. Thoon makes an appearance in The Blood of Olympus. During the final battle, he is beaten to death by the Fates themselves with clubs which Jason notes is a scary sight.

=== Demigods ===
The following demigod characters all have one parent who is a Greek or Roman god (or, more rarely, a Titan), while the other parent is a mortal human. It is common for these "half-bloods", as they are known, to grow up unaware that they are not entirely human. They are frequently referred to by gods and other mythological beings as "mortals".

- Alabaster Torrington – An English American demigod son of Hecate, Alabaster appears in The Son of Magic. Due to being Hecate's son, he is the half-brother of the murderous monster Lamia. Alabaster allied with Kronos during the Titan War in The Last Olympian and was sent into exile after the Titan War after refusing to stay at Camp Half-Blood. He claims to have led his siblings to their deaths during the war against the Olympians. Alabaster's powers include the ability to cast protection spells for himself, the ability to track other people, the ability to remove a spell from another person, and the ability to control the Mist, which allows him the ability to manipulate the memories and perceptions of those who cannot see through it. Alabaster is the only canon demigod in any of the series to not be created by Rick Riordan and was instead created by his son Haley.
- Alice Miyazawa – Alice is a teenage Japanese American daughter of Hermes. She is a close friend of Julia, and the two are never far from one another. Chiron states that she and Julia have taken over the Stoll brothers' knack for mischief, following Travis' enrollment in college and Connor's sudden reservement that it caused. The two girls harbor a crush on Apollo.
- Austin Lake – Austin is a teenage African-American son of Apollo. His mother, Latricia Lake, is a music professor at Oberlin College in Oberlin, Ohio whose music theory class Apollo once took. He first appears in The Last Olympian, where he is seen fighting alongside his brothers and sisters of the Apollo Cabin. Austin serves as a major character in The Hidden Oracle, where his and Kayla's abductions in the woods by Nero prompt Apollo to rescue them. In The Tower of Nero, he participates in the final battle with the Roman emperor Nero. Austin's main power is a form of musical audiokinesis. He can use his musical abilities to heal (via his singing voice) and put curses on (Austin is able to put week-long curses on people that make them only able to talk in rhyming couplets) others and possesses an aptitude for music higher than even most his fellow children of Apollo. Miles mainly plays jazz music and is an excellent saxophone player who is also proficient (though not to the same extent) at the violin. In addition to his musical abilities, Austin, like many children of Apollo, is very skilled at archery.
- Bianca di Angelo – Bianca was a daughter of Hades and the older sister of Nico. Percy, Annabeth, Grover, and Thalia rescued her and Nico along with the help of the Hunters of Artemis from Westover Hall and Dr. Thorn. She becomes a Hunter of Artemis, whom she attempts to rescue in The Titan's Curse, alongside Percy, Grover, Thalia, and Zoë. She sacrifices herself to save the group from a mechanical prototype of Talos which she turned on when she got a figurine of Hades for Nico. Nico tries to summon her from the dead many times but only meets her when Percy comes. In The Son of Neptune, she tries for rebirth on the Isle of the Blest. In The Sun and the Star, Hades arranges for Bianca's spirit to appear to Nico in a dream along with their mother Maria to give Nico closure on the loss of his family. In the TV series, she is portrayed by Olive Abercrombie.
- Billie Ng – Billie is a daughter of Demeter. In The Hidden Oracle, she is the only demigod of the Demeter cabin left in the winter season after the disappearance of her counselor, Miranda, until the arrival of Meg. She points out Meg's parentage during her claiming, in which a sickle and grain, symbols of Demeter, glow above her head.
- Bobby – Bobby is a caregiver of Hannibal. He is first mentioned in The Son of Neptune. His Olympian parent is unknown. In The Tyrant's Tomb, Bobby becomes a zombie due to attacks of eurynomos, and is killed by his friend Lavinia.
- Butch Walker – Butch is the head counselor of the Iris cabin at Camp Half-Blood. He and Annabeth bring Jason, Piper, and Leo to the camp at the beginning of The Lost Hero. He is bald and muscular, with a tattoo of a rainbow on his upper arm. In The Chalice of the Gods, he is mentioned to be from Minnesota and is at home and thus unable to help Percy, Annabeth and Grover to meet his mother.
- Castor and Pollux – Castor was a son of Dionysus and Pollux is a son of Dionysus. They are twin brothers, and both are named after the Gemini. Pollux survives the war against the Titans, but Castor is killed in The Battle of the Labyrinth when he was stabbed by a demigod allied with Kronos.
- Cecil Markowitz – Cecil is a son of Hermes. In The Blood of Olympus, he is a part of the team sent to sabotage Camp Jupiter's onagers. In The Hidden Oracle, he is the first to be kidnapped by Nero and strapped to a crucifix to be sacrificed to burn the Grove of Dodona, although Apollo and Meg manage to save him.
- Charles Beckendorf – Charles was a son of Hephaestus. He was the head counselor of the Hephaestus cabin before he died and was replaced by Jake Mason. Like his father, he is a master smith. He is African American. He was in a relationship with Silena, and is described as Mrs. O'Leary's best friend next to Percy. He died during an assault on the Princess Andromeda with Percy in the beginning The Last Olympian, around the age of 18. He had plans to attend NYU in the fall. After death, his ghost is visited by Nico in the Underworld where he is waiting for Silena (suggesting but it is not confirmed he knew that she was the "spy") to join him. When Silena dies during the Battle of Manhattan, her last word is Beckendorf's name, suggesting that she sees him in Elysium and that they are reunited in the afterlife.
- Chiara Benvenuti – Chiara is a daughter of Tyche. She is Italian and indulges in the language when she curses, which Apollo understands much to his dismay. She has a rivalry with Damien, but is shown to be close friends otherwise. Apollo has more than once expressed his interest on her, though he does it with Damien also.
- Chris Rodriguez – Chris is a teenage Hispanic-American son of Hermes. After never being claimed by Hermes, Chris turned against the Olympians and initially sided with Kronos. He first appears in The Sea of Monsters and appears on Luke's yacht The Andromeda and is sent on a quest to the Labyrinth to find an entrance to Camp Half-Blood. While inside the Labyrinth, Chris was driven insane by the Ghost King Minos, but is rescued by Clarisse (who has feelings for him) and is taken back to Camp-Half Blood. In The Battle of the Labyrinth, Dionysus uses his powers to restore Chris' sanity and Chris begins dating Clarisse after the two bond when she takes care of him during his recovery from the Labyrinth. In The Last Olympian, Chris fights with Clarisse and the rest of the camp in the Battle of Manhattan. Chris is noted to be a very capable fighter, having been selected by Kronos' forces to travel through the highly dangerous and complex Labyrinth alone and being one of the best fighters at the Battle of Manhattan. Chris likely possesses the standard abilities of a child of Hermes and is specifically known to have the ability of clauditiskinesis, or the ability to sense and control the internal structure of any lock he comes across, even being able to manipulate a lock telepathically if he concentrates hard enough. In the film adaption of The Sea of Monsters, Chris Rodriguez is portrayed by Grey Damon. In the TV series, he is portrayed by Andrew Alvarez and Kevin Chacon.
- Clovis – Clovis is the lead counselor of the Hypnos cabin. In The Lost Hero, Annabeth consults him regarding Jason's memory loss. In The Blood of Olympus, Nico sends a dream message to him to contact Thalia.
- Connor and Travis Stoll – Connor and Travis are sons of Hermes. They serve as lead counselors of the Hermes cabin after Luke's departure. The Stolls are known to be crafty and mischievous, like their father. They are tall and thin, with stringy brown hair. Both survive the Titan war. In The Hidden Oracle, Connor becomes the sole counselor due to Travis attending college, something that he still has not gotten over with. They are friends of Percy.
- Dakota – Dakota was a son of Bacchus. He has a borderline-addiction to extra-sugary red Kool-Aid. He was both a centurion of the Fifth Cohort and a senator, known for often being on a sugar high. Despite his frequent states of hyperactivity, Dakota is still often shown to be a capable leader and friend in both, such as being one of the first people to accept Percy into life at Camp Jupiter instead of treating him with contempt and suspicion and being one of the first Roman officers to defy Octavian's orders in The Blood of Olympus and choosing to side with Reyna and her attempts to de-escalate the conflict between Camp Half-Blood and Camp Jupiter. In The Tyrant's Tomb, he is mortally wounded during the Battle of San Francisco Bay and later dies of his injuries. His funeral pyre is scented with Kool-Aid in honor of his love for it. In The Sun and the Star, Will fondly remembers Dakota clumsily trying to help out in the infirmary after the final battle with Gaea. Dakota possessed the standard abilities of a child of Bacchus, such as chlorokinesis (the ability control plants) and the ability to either induce or cure madness in an individual and is an excellent fighter, holding his own against Jason.
- Damien White – Damien is a son of Nemesis. He has a heated rivalry with Chiara, although Apollo hints that the two are in a relationship at the end of The Hidden Oracle.
- Drew Tanaka – Drew is a daughter of Aphrodite. In The Lost Hero, she was the lead counselor of the cabin, succeeding Silena. She bullied and controlled her cabin members with her power of charmspeak, leading Piper to successfully challenge her for the lead counselor position. She appears in The Serpent's Shadow where she attends the same private high school as Sadie and bullies and harasses her. During a school dance, she unknowingly meets Anubis, leaving her stuttering "oh my gods" repeatedly as she jealously watches Anubis and Sadie dance with each other.
- Ellis Wakefield – Ellis is a son of Ares. In The Hidden Oracle, he is the second demigod to be kidnapped by Nero in the woods of Camp Half-Blood. Apollo later frees him and the others. In the TV series, he is portrayed by Adam Swain.
- Ethan Nakamura – Ethan was a son of Nemesis. He fought with Kronos and the Titans but begins to rethink his position. In The Last Olympian, he learns Percy's Achilles' heel, but instead of killing him, Ethan turns on Kronos. However, his attack fails and Kronos kills him. Before he falls to his death 500 feet from Olympus, Ethan tells Percy that none of the bad blood that led to the war would have been caused if the minor gods had thrones on Olympus.
- Georgina – Georgina is a maybe daughter of Apollo who was adopted by Hemithea and Josephine and raised at the Waystation. When she was seven, she started to show signs of her father's powers when the Oracle of Trophonius entranced her. She was kidnapped by Commodus before the events of The Dark Prophecy. Apollo frees her and realizes that she may be a daughter he does not know about.
- Gwendolyn "Gwen" – Gwendolyn is a centurion of the Fifth Cohort at Camp Jupiter. She is killed in The Son of Neptune but comes back to life because of Thanatos' capture. Her return prompts Mars to appear at Camp Jupiter and explain the circumstances of Thanatos' absence. She retires as centurion the day after because she decided to attend the college in New Rome and was replaced by Frank . It is suggested that her death was because she was murdered by Octavian, but this is never confirmed.
- Halcyon Green – Halcyon is a son of Apollo gifted with prophecy and under "house arrest" for revealing to a young woman her fate. He gives his life to save Luke and Thalia from the Leucrotae and his burning mansion in The Diary of Luke Castellan.
- Harley – Harley is a son of Hephaestus, first seen in The Lost Hero. He is eight years old at the time of The Hidden Oracle, but very muscular. Harley has been trying to locate Leo, his older half-brother, with a magical beacon ever since his disappearance in the aftermath of the Second Gigantomachy.
- Holly and Laurel Victor – Holly and Laurel are a pair of sisters and daughters of Nike. As per their upbringing, they are very competitive and refuse to be made second, hence why they are placed as co-counselors of the Nike's cabin, otherwise, as Kayla puts it "they would've taken over the camp by now and proclaimed a dictatorship". Apollo describes them as looking like the "gorgeous, ferociously athletic African nymphs" that he and Artemis used to hang out with at Lake Tritonis.
- Jacob – Jacob is the legion Aquilifer (which is an eagle bearer) of Camp Jupiter. His godly parent is unknown. In The Tyrant's Tomb, he is killed during the Battle of San Francisco Bay.
- Jake Mason – Jake becomes the head of the Hephaestus cabin after Beckendorf's death in The Last Olympian. He is severely injured during the Hephaestus' cabin's attempt to tame the bronze dragon later named Festus. In The Lost Hero, he steps down and gives the lead counselor position to Leo, after Leo finds Hephaestus' bunker in the woods. In The Sun and the Star, it is revealed that he came out as LGBTQ after Nico publicly came out as gay.
- Jason – Not to be confused with Jason Grace or the mythical Jason, he is a demigod briefly mentioned in The Titan's Curse, being instructed by Thalia to team with Silena and Laurel during capture the flag. His godly parent is unknown.
- Julia Feingold – Julia is a daughter of Hermes. Like her best friend, Alice, she harbors a crush on Apollo.
- Katie Gardner – Katie is the head counselor for Demeter's cabin at Camp Half-Blood after the war with the Titans. Katie strongly dislikes the Stoll brothers, who once put chocolate Easter bunnies on the Demeter cabin's grass roof.
- Kayla Knowles – Kayla is a daughter of Apollo first mentioned in The Last Olympian carrying out the orders of Michael Yew. She is a major character in The Hidden Oracle, and is abducted by Nero. Kayla's inherited gift is archery. Her father, Darren Knowles, is a Canadian archery coach.
- Lacy – Lacy is a daughter of Aphrodite who befriends Piper in The Lost Hero. She also appears in The Kane Chronicles, where she is familiar with Sadie.
- Larry – Larry is A senator at Camp Jupiter and a member of either the First or Second Cohort.
- Laurel – Not to be confused with Laurel Victor, Laurel is only mentioned in The Titan's Curse. Because of circumstances around her mention, she may be a daughter of Aphrodite.
- Lee Fletcher – Lee was the head of Apollo cabin. He leads a team to attack a dragon threatening the camp. He is killed by a giant in The Battle of the Labyrinth.
- Lavinia Asimov – Lavinia is the daughter of Terpsichore, Muse of Dance, and likes to hike. She is promoted to centurion of the Fifth Cohort at the end of The Tyrant's Tomb where she plays a vital role in the Battle of San Francisco Bay.
- Leila – Leila is a daughter of Ceres and a centurion of the Fourth Cohort. In The Blood of Olympus, she and the rest of her cohort defect to Reyna's side once the latter arrives at Long Island.
- Lou Ellen Blackstone – Lou Ellen is a daughter of Hecate in The Lost Hero. She is known for playing magical tricks on fellow campers. In The Blood of Olympus, she is part of the team that sabotages the Roman onagers, using her control over the Mist to help hide the team from their enemies.
- Malcolm Pace – Malcolm is the assistant counselor of the Athena cabin under Annabeth. In The Sun and the Star, it is revealed that he came out as LGBTQ after Nico publicly came out as gay.
- Michael Kahale – Michael is a son of Venus and a centurion of the First Cohort at Camp Jupiter. He is Native Hawaiian. Michael is one of Camp Jupiter's greatest fighters and possesses the powers of amokinesis (which allows him to control love, lust, and beauty), beauty radiation (this ability is shown to actually be a major asset in battle and combat as it prohibits his enemies from attacking him even to counter his own attacks), and most notably superhuman strength, with Reyna noting that his strength is on a comparable level to both a Laistrygonian and a Cyclops. Michael is shown to be very loyal to Octavian due to the latter being his sponsor, although he is shown to often be conflicted in complying with Octavian's more questionable decisions, a reluctance that increases as Octavian's actions bring Camp Jupiter closer and closer to war and unnecessarily jeopardizes the safety of both camps. In The Blood of Olympus, he reluctantly follows Octavian's order to attack Camp Half-Blood, but his loyalty to Octavian finally ends when he chooses to allow Octavian to die when the latter ignites an onager with his feet being tangled with it. In The Tyrant's Tomb, he is said to have been sent on a failed quest to stop the emperors' yachts, although it is currently unknown if he lived or died. He is later mentioned by Will in The Sun and the Stars, when Will recalls that he, Nico, and Michael did not attempt to stop Octavian from accidentally getting himself killed, although Will does not mention if nor does he imply that Michael is either alive or dead.
- Michael Varus – Michael was a son of Janus and a former praetor of Camp Jupiter in the 1970s. He was killed by Alcyoneus during an expedition in Alaska and the eagle of Camp Jupiter was stolen with him. This tarnished the reputation of Varus' cohort, the Fifth, which was not recovered until Jason's promotion to praetor over three decades later. Varus' ghost appears to attack Percy in The Son of Neptune and again in The Blood of Olympus where he confronts Jason with his mother's mania and then mortally wounds him with an imperial gold sword.
- Michael Yew – Michael Yew was a son of Apollo and succeeded Lee Fletcher as head of the cabin. He is described as very short, with a face that reminds Percy of a ferret. In a The Demigod Files interview with Clarisse, she mentions that she would want to pulverize Michael, thus stating that they are enemies. He is an excellent archer like most of Apollo's children and uses sonic arrows which were given to him by his father. He was presumed killed after leading a group of demigods in the fight against Kronos' army; Percy found his bow, but not his body. In The House of Hades, he's mentioned as having died. In The Sun and the Star, Michael appears to Will in a nightmare of the Battle of Manhattan caused by Nyx.
- Miranda Gardiner – Miranda is second in command of the Demeter cabin in The Lost Hero. She assumes the head counselor position later in the series. In The Hidden Oracle, Miranda is the third to be kidnapped during Nero's spree in luring Apollo, which greatly disturbs Chiron due to her important status as counselor, though Apollo manages to rescue her. She is dating Sherman.
- Mitchell – Mitchell is a son of Aphrodite who is a friend of Piper in The Lost Hero.
- Nyssa Barrera – Nyssa is a daughter of Hephaestus. She meets Leo in The Lost Hero. She is mentioned on several occasions in the beginning and end of The Lost Hero. She also helps plan out Harley's Three-Legged Death Race in The Hidden Oracle.
- Olujime – Olujime, also known as Jamie (and Jimmy in the eBook edition), is a demigod that worked as a mercenary for Commodus in The Dark Prophecy. Olujime is a young Yoruban Nigerian man, with his heritage being shown through his usage of the Yoruban and Hausan martial arts Gidigbo and Dambe. Jamie is a graduate student at Indiana University, where he is studying to earn his graduate degree in accounting, with it being revealed that the reason he began working as a mercenary for Commodus was to financially support himself. Sometime after becoming a mercenary, Olujime had a falling out with his employer which led to Commodus imprisoning Jamie out of fear of the latter betraying him. Jamie would turn against Commodus when he was freed from his prison by Apollo and assisted Apollo in defending the Waystation. Through his turning on his former employer and his subsequent interactions with Apollo, Olujime is shown to ultimately be a good and kind man who was simply down on his luck and redeems himself by helping in the defense of the Waystation. Jamie states that he has an unnamed girlfriend, much to the dismay of Apollo, whom had grown attracted to him. Jamie is notable for being the first demigod to appear in the series to not be Greek, Roman, or Norse (the Egyptian gods in The Kane Chronicles do not sire children with mortals, therefore there are no Egyptian demigods in the continuity of the series) and is instead a Yoruban demigod with powers of electrokinesis, which are revealed when he uses in the battle of the Wavestation. Due to their shared abilities of electrokinesis Olujime's fighting style reminds Apollo of the fighting styles of Zeus and/or Jupiter, although his usage of Yoruban and Hausan/non-Greco Roman martial arts and fighting styles, along with the different coloration of Olujime's electric powers and the electric powers of Zeus' children (The powers of Zeus and his children are consistently depicted as bright gold, while the powers of Olujime are depicted as having a red coloration) make Apollo and Thalia recognize that Jamie is not a demigod of Greek or Roman origin and is instead from a separate pantheon entirely. Olujime's exact godly parentage is unknown, but it is very likely that he is the son of the Yoruban Orisha Shango, who in the Yoruban religion has control over thunder, electricity, and lightning. Additionally tying Jamie to Shango are the red coloring of his powers, with red being a color often associated with Shango, their common usage of an ax, and the red and white necklace that Olujime wears (white, like red, is another color associated with Shango).
- Paolo Montes – Paolo is a son of Hebe from Camp Half-Blood who first appears in The Hidden Oracle. He is Afro-Brazilian and speaks mainly in Brazilian Portuguese, but understands English. In addition to the standard youth manipulation powers that a child of Hebe possesses, Paolo has vitakinesis power that enable him to heal himself from incredibly gruesome injuries, to the extent that he is shown to be capable of mending numerous amputated limbs back to full functioning capacity in a short time. Paolo again appears in Camp Half-Blood Confidential with his fellow campers discussing curses. He is briefly mentioned in The Sun and the Star by Will, where Will mentions that he still attends Camp Half-Blood and was one of the demigods inspired by Nico coming out.
- Pranjal – Pranjal is a son of Asclepius who works as Camp Jupiter's healer. In The Tyrant's Tomb, he and Meg gather Buster's horn shavings as one of the ingredients for a medicine to heal Apollo's stomach cut. However, he is unable to cure the god's zombie infection and he can only help by keeping it at bay for a while.
- Sherman Yang – Sherman is a son of Ares who was left in the care of his cabin as Clarisse, the counselor, is attending university. He marks Meg for target after the latter kicks him in the crotch, together with Connor. Like the other children of Ares, he is easily provoked. He is dating Miranda. In The Tower of Nero, Apollo sees him negotiating the spoils of war with the leader of the Troglodytes following the defeat of Triumvirate Holdings.
- Silena Beauregard – Silena was a daughter of Aphrodite. She was the head of the cabin for most of Percy Jackson & the Olympians. She was kind to Percy and befriended Clarisse after giving the other girl advice about her first relationship. She served as a spy for Kronos within Camp Half-Blood, but wanted to quit when her actions led to the death of her boyfriend Charles Beckendorf. Luke blackmails her into continuing as a spy. In The Last Olympian, she redeems herself by disguising herself as Clarisse and leading the Ares cabin into battle against the Titans. She dies a Hero's death and is given a funeral at camp. In The Lightning Thief musical, she is portrayed by Carrie Compere.
- Valentina Diaz – Valentina is a daughter of Aphrodite and the only member of her cabin left during winter season in The Hidden Oracle.

==== Historic demigods ====
Different historic people are mentioned to have Greek gods as their parents or are otherwise involved with the series. Among the known historical demigods are:

- Adolf Hitler – Austrian painter turned Fascist dictator. The son of Pluto. Hazel says Pluto looks like him.
- Alfred Hitchcock – The son of an unknown god. Alfred is mentioned when Percy and Will arrive at the Plaza Hotel. It says that the Plaza attracted many famous demigods over the years, such as Hitchcock and the Beatles.
- Amelia Earhart – The daughter of Zeus. In The Sea of Monsters, Annabeth mentions Earhart when talking to Circe. She was among the list of great female Heroes. In The Lost Hero, Aeolus mentions that he knocked Earhart out of the sky and that the gods still pester him about it while talking to Jason, Piper, and Leo in his fortress.
- Archimedes – Archimedes is the son of Hephaestus, credited with the creation of many modern machines and an accurate approximation of pi. He is in modern times considered one of the best-known and one of the greatest of Hephaestus' children. It is the wish among many of Archimedes' modern-day siblings to find the lost works of Archimedes. During the Second Punic War, Archimedes was killed by a Roman guard working for General Marcus Claudius Marcellus who had given specific orders not to harm Archimedes. While searching for Nico with Frank and Hazel in Rome as seen in The Mark of Athena, Leo recovered the lost works of Archimedes. He uses them to destroy the eidolons, possessive spirits working for Gaea. He planned to take them to Bunker 9 at Camp Half-Blood to study them further. With Archimedes' works, Leo hoped to save Camp Half-Blood from the Roman forces from Camp Jupiter. Subsequently, Leo is seen to have adapted some of them for use on the Argo II in The Blood of Olympus as well as his own personal use.
- Banastre Tarleton – A demigod son of Bellona who participated in the Battle of Waxhaws. According to Reyna, Tarleton ignored the Colonial leader Abraham Buford's white flag and his forces massacred Buford's men. It is also mentioned that he was one of many Roman demigods who fought for the British during the American Revolution while the Greeks fought for the colonists.
- Blackbeard – The son of Ares, who was a notorious English pirate during the early 18th century. Instead of dying in his famous last stand, his ship landed on Circe's island where he and his crew were turned into guinea pigs for several hundred years. In The Sea of Monsters, Edward Teach is seen in guinea pig form. While on a quest, Annabeth used Hermes' multivitamins to turn all of the guinea pigs back into humans. Along with his crew, he began to chase after Circe while Percy and Annabeth escaped with their pirate ship, the Queen Anne's Revenge. In The Son of Neptune, Reyna reveals that Blackbeard and his pirates took over the island and enslaved Reyna and her sister before they managed to escape. In the TV series, he is portrayed by Andrew Kavadas.
- Frédéric Bartholdi – The son of Athena who designed the Statue of Liberty. In "Percy Jackson and the Stolen Chariot", Percy mentions Bartholdi to Clarisse. According to what Annabeth had told Percy, Bartholdi designed the Statue of Liberty as a representation of his mother Athena.
- George Washington – A son of Athena and the first president of the United States. In The Lightning Thief, Washington is mentioned in the book as one of the few famous and successful demigods who survived outside of Camp Half-Blood and is depicted in one of the works displays during the Camp Half-Blood fireworks.
- Harriet Tubman – A daughter of Hermes and an abolitionist spy. In The Battle of the Labyrinth, Chiron states that Tubman once used many clear-sighted mortals on the Underground Railroad, hinting that she may have utilized the Labyrinth to help transport escaped slaves.
- Harry Houdini – The son of an unknown god who is a famous magician and escape artist. It is mentioned in The Lightning Thief that he, Orpheus, and Hercules have each been able to escape from the Underworld. A Nereid said that Houdini "could escape even the depths of Tartarus".
- Jack London – The son of Mercury and author of The Call of the Wild. He was mentioned in The Lost Hero as the architect of the Wolf House where Lupa judges the demigods to see if they are worthy of being trained at Camp Jupiter.
- Joshua Lawrence Chamberlain – The son of an unknown god and a soldier in the American Civil War. In The Sea of Monsters, Chamberlain is mentioned by Chiron when talking to Percy after having rescued him and his friends from the Princess Andromeda.
- Louis XIV – The son of Apollo and a king of France. In The Hidden Oracle, Louis is mentioned by Apollo when talking about his children.
- Peter Stuyvesant – The son of Hecate and the Dutch director-general of the colony of New Netherland. In Wrath of the Triple Goddess, he leads a ghostly army on Halloween night before being banished by Percy and Annabeth.
- Thomas Faynor – The son of Hephaestus. He is mentioned as being the last child of Hephaestus to be able to create and control fire before Leo. Faynor accidentally started the Great Fire of London in 1666 after losing control of his powers.
- William H. Seward – The son of Hebe and a former Governor of New York. During the Battle of Manhattan in The Last Olympian, Annabeth activates a statue of Seward in Madison Square Park. The statue was one of many that Daedalus had created, to either attack or defend the Olympian gods, depending on which he needed to do to survive.
- William Shakespeare – The son of Apollo, and one of the rotating members of the Judgement Pavilion.
- William Tecumseh Sherman – A son of Ares who fought in the American Civil War. In The Mark of Athena, Sherman was mentioned by Coach Hedge when he and the seven arrived in Atlanta calling him Frank's half-brother and mistaking the son of Mars as Greek.

==== Legacies ====
The following are mentioned not as direct children of the Olympians, but as grandchildren, great-grandchildren, or the like:

- Bryce Lawrence – Bryce was a legacy of Orcus. In The Blood of Olympus, he is seen by Reyna in a dream. Despite being banished from Camp Jupiter by Reyna years ago for having killed his own centurion, Octavian allows him to return turning a blind eye to his cruelty toward the rest of his fellow cohort when he first joined the legion. He is given his probatio necklace and is assigned to the Fifth Cohort. In South Carolina, Bryce overhears Reyna telling the story of killing her father. He tries to capture her and take her to Octavian to charge her with the crime of patricide. He then is turned into a ghost by Nico and forced into the Underworld.
- Emily Zhang – Emily Zhang was Frank's mother. She was a Canadian Forces soldier who died in Afghanistan. She was descended from Periclymenus, a grandson of Poseidon, which imbues her with the ability to shapeshift.
- Grandma Zhang – Grandma Zhang was Emily's mother, also with her family's gift. She believed Frank should spend more time studying his Chinese heritage. Her fate is unknown after a monster attack destroys her home, but it is suggested that she may have managed to escape by shapeshifting into a bird.
- Julia – Julia is a little girl who is the descendant of an unspecified god. In The Son of Neptune, she works as Terminus' helper at the security checkpoints at the New Rome town line. She often hides playfully underneath Terminus' statue base. Her parents died in The Tyrant's Tomb and Terminus adopted her in the end of the book.
- Octavian – Octavian was an ambitious and cunning descendant of Apollo. He reads the auguries for Camp Jupiter. He is thin and blonde and is said to "look eighteen but could probably pass as younger". After seeing Octavian and Will together, Nico describes Octavian as a watered-down, unhealthy version of Will – like a photo that had been copied too many times and without anything that makes a child of Apollo special. After Jason disappears, he campaigns to succeed to Jason's position as praetor. He is suspicious of the amnesic Percy when he arrives at Camp Jupiter. He deduces Percy is a Greek demigod, rather than Roman, by calling him graceus, the Latin for "greek", mocking him, and attempting to undermine his quest. It is also implied that he murders Gwen, the centurion of the Fifth Cohort. However, Gwen is quickly resurrected due to the Doors of Death being open. When demigods from Camp Half-Blood arrive at Camp Jupiter, Octavian declares the Greeks invaders and urges the Romans to fight them off, believing the Greeks to be in league with Gaea. His warmongering escalates further in The House of Hades when he violates direct orders from Reyna not to attack Camp Half-Blood after leaving for her quest to get the Athena Parthenos back to Long Island, leaving him in command of the Legion. Apollo himself shows disgust toward Octavian and his actions later on, although Zeus suggests that Apollo may have encouraged Octavian. As time goes on, Octavian's actions and behavior grow more insane and he eventually declares himself Pontifex Maximus. In The Blood of Olympus, he leads a siege of Camp Half-Blood with an army of Roman soldiers and allied monsters and onagers that, as revealed in The Hidden Oracle, came from the Three Emperors. Octavian's rule is eventually overthrown after a team from Camp Half-Blood sabotages his weapons and Reyna returns with the Athena Parthenos to restore order, supported by two of the legion's centurions. When Gaea rises, Octavian loses his mind completely and decides to launch an onager shot at the goddess. Nico and Will confront Octavian who fails to notice that his robes got caught in the firing ropes. Remembering Hades' wisdom that some deaths should not be prevented, Nico allows Octavian to fire, resulting in the insane Roman launching himself at the goddess as well. Octavian is killed in the explosion, but his actions are covered up and he is declared a Hero as his shot may have actually aided Leo in defeating the goddess. From Leo's perspective, he heard a comet shrieking like a little girl as it flew toward him, much to Leo's surprise and confusion. However, Nico was left worried that all he did by allowing Octavian to kill himself was to kill Leo, unaware that Leo was resurrected after the battle. In The Sun and the Star, Nico and Will both admit that they suffer from guilt over allowing Octavian to kill himself in such a manner and not trying to stop him.

=== Mythological figures ===
The following characters from Greek mythology appear in this series. Most of them are the direct children of gods or Titans, but a few are mortals with such great power that they are able to influence the realm of the gods.

- Achilles – Achilles was the son of Thetis and Peleus. The ghost of Achilles appears briefly in The Last Olympian, warning Percy about the Curse of Achilles.
- Agamethus – Agamethus was the son of King Erginus and mortal half-brother of Trophonius. He was decapitated by Trophonius to spare the latter from being captured following a disastrous attempt to steal the riches of King Hyrieus. His headless ghost resurfaces to deliver baby Georgina to Hemithea and Josephine at the Waystation and later becomes a constant visitor of the sanctuary. Lacking a head, he speaks by arranging the letters of a Magic 8 Ball.
- Charon – Charon is the ferryman who carries the dead across the River Styx to the underworld. Percy and his friends meet him in The Lightning Thief. He also states he does not like being confused with the centaur Chiron. He likes Italian suits. In the film adaptation, Charon is played by Julian Richings. In the musical, Charon is portrayed by Carrie Compere. In the TV series, Charon is portrayed by Travis Woloshyn.
- Chrysaor – Chrysaor was a half-giant and the son of Medusa and Poseidon, the brother of Pegasus, and the father of Geryon. He is first mentioned in The Last Olympian when Percy and Annabeth go to see the Oracle of Delphi in the attic of the Big House. A pair of fuzzy dice is said to have been stolen from his car. In The Mark of Athena, Chrysaor and his crew attacked the Argo II in the Mediterranean with the intent to sell Piper and Hazel to Circe, kill Jason, and then give Annabeth and Percy to Gaea. Chrysaor battles Percy on the deck of the Argo II. Once Chrysaor's crew abandon him, Frank and Percy surround him. Chrysaor is knocked off the Argo II by Frank and Percy and Chrysaor falls into the sea. His ship, golden mask, and loot are claimed by the Argo II crew who then sacrifice it as an offering to Bacchus.
- Circe – Circe is a Greek sorceress and the daughter of Helios. Circe ran a magical beauty boutique in the Sea of Monsters, where she went by the alias of "C.C.". While she treated females at her spa, she turned males into guinea pigs. When Percy was turned into a guinea pig, Annabeth used multivitamins from Hermes to restore him, and together they defeated Circe. In The Heroes of Olympus, it is revealed that Circe employed Reyna and Hylla after they left Puerto Rico, until the pirates were freed and proceeded to capture the sisters. In the TV series, Circe is portrayed by Rosemarie DeWitt.
- Daedalus – Daedalus was an architect of the Labyrinth. He was the son of Athena and the father of Icarus. He killed his nephew Perdix but escaped eternal punishment by casting his soul into automatons. Athena branded him with a murderer's brand in the shape of a partridge. In The Battle of the Labyrinth, Daedalus appears under the alias of a Camp Half-Blood worker named Quintus (Latin: "the fifth"). Percy and Annabeth convince him to use his technical genius to help defeat the Titan army in the Labyrinth. He then accepts death, willing to Annabeth his laptop filled with thousands of years of notes and ideas, which Annabeth puts to use before its loss in The Mark of Athena. In death, he becomes the Underworld's architect and is allowed to visit Icarus and Perdix on weekends. In The House of Hades, Daedalus' Labyrinth is restored by Pasiphaë, although it is stated in The Hidden Oracle to be less malevolent ever since his death.
- Eurytion – Eurytion is a son of Ares who works on Geryon's ranch. He appears in The Battle of the Labyrinth and helps Percy and Annabeth locate Hephaestus.
- Heracles/Hercules – Heracles/Hercules was a famous Greek Hero and the son of Zeus and Alcmene. Following his death, Zeus brought him up to Mount Olympus to live with him and he is engaged to Hebe. Heracles was mentioned in (but did not appear in) Percy Jackson & the Olympians, usually when monsters that he had fought show up to trouble Percy. In The Titan's Curse, it is revealed that Zoë helped Heracles steal the Apples of the Hesperides and gave him a magical sword Riptide which he had forgotten to return, leaving her to be disowned by her sisters and him giving her no credit for her help. Hercules appears in The Mark of Athena where he was tasked by Zeus to guard the Pillars of Hercules and issues Piper and Jason a quest for permission to enter the Mediterranean Sea, having them steal Achelous' other horn for him although Piper chooses to keep it for herself. In The House of Hades, the giant Clytius reveals that Hercules and Dionysus, both then very powerful demigods well on their way to becoming gods, had helped Hecate to defeat him the first time.
- Hyacinthus – Hyacinthus was a beloved lover of Apollo. The right for him was contested between Apollo and Zephyrus, and when the former refused to share, Zephyrus caused an accident that led to Apollo's accidental killing over Hyacinthus. His death is regarded by Apollo as one of his two greatest losses of his life, together with Daphne's petrification. Upon his death, Hyacinthus was reincarnated as a hyacinth. To this day, Apollo is still haunted by visions of him.
- Irus – Irus was a beggar who ran afoul of Odysseus upon his return to Ithaca. In The Blood of Olympus, Jason posed as Irus to get close to the ghosts of the Suitors of Penelope.
- King Midas – King Midas was a king who possessed the golden touch which turned anything he touched to gold. He is among the people brought back to life by Gaea in The Lost Hero where his Golden Touch was restored upon him and his son Lityerses emerging from the Doors of Death. It has been mentioned that Midas has occasionally turned Lityerses to gold by mistake causing him to use the nearby lake to wash the gold off of him. Jason, Piper, and Leo come to Midas' mansion in Omaha, Nebraska. He was initially polite before revealing his allegiance and turning Leo and Piper into solid gold. Jason fought back against Midas and Lityerses and managed to restore Leo and Piper to life along with his other victims. Midas is left at the mercy of his freed victims and it is confirmed in The Dark Prophecy that he was sent back to the Underworld.
- King Minos – King Minos is a former king who becomes one of the judges of the Underworld. Nico consults him in The Battle of the Labyrinth, but Minos kidnaps Nico and tries to kill Daedalus who constructed the Labyrinth for him. Fighting back, Nico banishes Minos back to the Underworld. When Daedalus later ends up in the Underworld, Minos tries to convince the other two judges to punish Daedalus to no avail.
- King Pirithous – King Pirithous is the son of Zeus and King of the Lapiths. He was known for being friends with Theseus following his victory of over the Minotaur. They planned to be married to anyone who was a daughter of Zeus. With Theseus wanting to marry Helen of Troy, Pirithous wanted to marry Persephone. When traveling to the Underworld, they stopped to rest and found themselves unable to get off the rock as the Furies appear before them. Heracles later traveled to the Underworld where he freed Theseus. When Heracles tries to free Pirithous, the Underworld shook because of him wanting to marry someone who was already the wife of one of the Big Three. Sometime later, Hazel encountered Pirithous. Hades eventually freed Pirithous where he hoped that he learned his lesson. Unbeknownst to Hades, Pirithous went on to ally with King Tantalus and Mary Tudor in a revenge plot against Hades that involved overthrowing him and taking control of the Underworld.
- King Sisyphus – A former ruler of Corinth. He had committed violations of guest hospitality, seduced his niece, plotted to kill his brother, Salmoneus, and told the river god Asopus where Zeus had his daughter. His major crimes involved cheating death twice. The first where he tricked Thanatos into showing him how the chains worked causing Thanatos to be trapped until Ares freed him (Thanatos being trapped displeased Ares since no one in battle could die). The second time was when he complained to Persephone that his wife Merope did not give him a proper funeral and sent Sisyphus' spirit to the living. Even when Sisyphus did not want to return to the Underworld, he was forcefully dragged back there by Hermes. His punishment in The Fields of Punishment was to push a boulder up a hill. When it got close to the top, the boulder would roll back to the bottom and Sisyphus was condemned to begin again. He appears in "Percy Jackson and the Sword of Hades" when Percy and Nico asked his advice while Thalia pushes the boulder up the hill. He does not really help them much, but he does say that he helped someone else. He said that he told that other person to go see Melinoë. Therefore, Percy and his friends go to see Melinoë as Sisyphus begs for them to set him free from his punishment for being here was a minor set-back.
- King Tantalus – King Tantalus is the spirit of a king from the Fields of Punishment who is the son of Zeus. He ended up there after killing his son Pelops, cutting him up, and serving him as food to the gods. His punishment in the Fields of Punishment was to stand under a fruit tree in the middle of a lake. When he tried to pluck the fruit to eat, the branches of the tree rose out of his reach and when he bent down to drink the water, the level would retreat. Tantalus became "tantalized" by having food and drink close to him, but unable to enjoy either. He becomes the activities director at Camp Half-Blood after Chiron is fired. He appears in The Sea of Monsters as a minor character. Even when hired as the activities director, he could not eat or drink as the food kept evading him. Tantalus is shown to hate Percy and his friends even more than he hates most half-bloods, yet shows favoritism to Clarisse, as when naming her Hero when the camp was attacked by Colchis Bulls or when she wins the chariot race and throwing a banquet in her honor. When Tyson is brought to camp, Tantalus insults and makes fun of him even when Tyson is claimed by Poseidon. When the camp is attacked by a large flock of Stymphalian birds, Tantalus blames it on Percy, Annabeth, and Tyson's "bad chariot driving" despite that they were the ones who defeated the birds. At the end of the book, his curse is lifted by Dionysus just before he is sent back to the Underworld as he attempts to take some food along. None of the campers are sad to see him go. In The Court of the Dead, Tantalus is one of three Underworld judges plotting to overthrow Hades alongside King Pirithous and Mary Tudor where he wears a satyr mask. In the TV series, Tantalus will be portrayed by Timothy Simons. Unlike the books, King Tantalus has a stuck-up personality, is shown to enforce the laws of Camp Half-Blood, and attempts to stop Percy, Annabeth, and Tyson from leaving Camp Half-Blood. In the season two finale, Tantalus finally grabs onto a chicken leg when making a speech and gets struck by a fireball from one of Luke's inside people.
- Lityerses – Lityerses is the son of King Midas who is nicknamed "Lit". In The Lost Hero, he and Midas emerged from the Doors of Death and were resurrected. After King Midas turns Leo and Piper to gold, he has Lityerses fight Jason before Midas can turn him to gold. After Jason defeats Lityerses, King Midas tries to help him only to accidentally turn him to gold. After throwing a rug over Lityerses, Jason summoned a thunderbolt that caused rain to come down on those who had been turned to gold, leaving Lit trapped as Midas was killed by his freed victims. By the events of The Dark Prophecy, Lityerses is freed from his golden form by Commodus and goes to work for him. He later defects to the side of the Waystation's inhabitants and helps to defeat Commodus' attack. Lit subsequently decides to settle at the Waystation and protect it from further harm. In The Tower of Nero, he continues to live at the Waystation and is stated to be adjusting well and to be heading up an elephant visitation program with Camp Jupiter.
- Medea – Medea was a sorceress and a granddaughter of Helios. Jason, Piper, and Leo encounter her in The Lost Hero, where she runs a mall in Chicago under the name "M" after being resurrected by Gaea through the Doors of Death. She becomes enraged upon learning Jason's name which he shares with her former husband, the Hero that recovered the Golden Fleece who left her. Her magic causes Jason and Leo to become hostile to one another. Realizing Medea is an agent of Gaea, Piper brings them to their senses and leads their escape before Medea can do anything else to them. In the process, Medea's mall is destroyed and she is killed in the explosion. Aphrodite later warns Piper that Medea will eventually return along with others due to the Doors of Death being opened by Gaea's forces. In The Burning Maze, a once again resurrected Medea returns and she is now working for Caligula. When she engages Meg in a charmspeak battle, she announces her plans to take Apollo's essence, combine it with her grandfather's leftover power, and make Caligula the new God of the Sun. Medea later appears in the throne room of Caligula asking him to perform the ritual after she trapped Jason and Piper in a tornado prison. When Apollo stabs himself, Medea and Caligula rush to perform the ritual before he dies. Her being focused on the ritual weakened the tornado prison enabling Piper to punch Medea. When Apollo reaches Herophile's holding area, Medea appears and prepares to extract Apollo's essence. Piper saves Apollo by stabbing Medea and pushing her into Helios' flames.
- Muses – Muses are the immortal daughters of Zeus and the Titan Mnemosyne, who inspired and preside over several creative arts. In The Lightning Thief, the Muses performed on Mount Olympus at the time when Percy returns Zeus' Master Bolt. As the gods celebrate, the Muses play music that sounds like anything the listener wants, so no one argues about the music. In The Titan's Curse, the Muses perform their music after the Gods decide not to kill Percy and Thalia. According to Percy, everybody hears the music they only want to hear, like classical for the gods and hip hop for the younger demigods. In The Last Olympian, a few Muses are shown playing some tunes on Olympus. Their hearts were not into it because of Kronos' attack on Mount Olympus while the Gods were out fighting Typhon.
  - Calliope – Calliope is the Muse of epic poetry.
  - Clio – Clio is the Muse of history.
  - Erato – Erato is the Muse of love poetry.
  - Euterpe – Euterpe is the Muse of music.
  - Melpomene – Melpomene is the Muse of tragedy.
  - Polyhymnia – Polyhymnia is the Muse of hymn.
  - Terpsichore – Terpsichore is the Muse of dance.
  - Thalia – Thalia is the Muse of comedy.
  - Urania – Urania is the Muse of astronomy.
- Narcissus – Narcissus is a hunter who was renowned for his beauty and disdained those that had loved him. Nemesis puts a spell on him that causes him to fall in love with the reflection of himself in the water where he dies upon not being able to leave his own reflection. After Gaea opened the Doors of Death, he was resurrected. In The Mark of Athena, Narcissus is encountered by Hazel and Leo at the Salt Lake in Utah where the demigods are looking for the Celestial Bronze which is needed to help repair the damaged Argo II. When Narcissus realizes that Hazel and Leo have managed to steal his bronze plate which he uses to be able to admire his own reflection, he and a mob of nymphs run after them, trying to kill them.
- Oracles – The Oracles are both beings and places that can give prophecies in Greek mythology. There are five Oracles, and four of them are associated with Apollo.
  - Oracle of Delphi – Apollo's Oracle of Delphi resides in the mummified remains of its host, until its power was transferred to Rachel in The Last Olympian. At the end of World War II, the Oracle issued the Great Prophecy, saying a child of the Big Three would determine the preservation or destruction of Olympus. This caused those gods to form a pact not to father more demigods. After Zeus killed his lover Maria di Angelo as a result of the prophecy, Hades cursed the Oracle's spirit to be trapped in its host in retaliation with this curse being broken after Nico and Hades were given acceptance by the gods and Camp Half-Blood. An attempt to transfer the spirit to May Castellan while the Oracle was still cursed resulted in May's insanity. Throughout The Trials of Apollo, the Oracle's power is inaccessible to Rachel until Apollo kills Python. In The Sea of Monsters film, the Oracle of Delphi is voiced by Shohreh Aghdashloo. In the musical, she is portrayed by Carrie Compere. In the TV series, she is portrayed by Jennifer Shirley and Heather Feeney.
  - Trophonius – Trophonius is the son of Apollo and is the half-brother of Agamethus. He and his brother's attempt to steal the riches of King Hyrieus ended with Trophonius reluctantly decapitating Agamethus to save himself, despite him having begged Apollo to save them. Later, he became guardian of an oracle which bears his name, reputedly the oracle that would drive its seekers into insanity unless proper rituals are conducted. Regardless of his antagonism to Apollo due to his predicament, he asks his father to destroy the Oracle and himself, so Commodus would not be able to access it again.
- Pasiphaë – Pasiphaë was a Greek sorceress and the daughter of Helios who appears in The House of Hades. She is resentful of the gods for punishing her by giving birth to Minotaur, while her husband, Minos, who caused the problem in the first place, enjoys the right as a judge in the Underworld for being Zeus' son. She is allied with the giants and restored the Labyrinth. She enters into a battle of sorcery with Hazel, who manages to drop her through a trap door into a bottomless pit using magic.
- Phineus/Phineas – Phineus/Phineas was a blind seer who appears in The Son of Neptune. Percy finds him in Portland where the Harpies are trying to steal his food. Before he dies from Gaea making him choose the poisoned gorgon's blood from the offer Percy gave him, he reveals to Percy the location of Alcyoneus' camp. In The House of Hades, Percy experiences a curse laid upon him by Phineas' death while in Tartarus.
- Procrustes – Procrustes was the son of Poseidon who is depicted as a half-giant and rogue thief/blacksmith who was previously defeated by Theseus. Procrustes appears in The Lightning Thief as "Crusty", a Los Angeles mattress store owner. He traps Annabeth and Grover on his waterbeds and tries to stretch their spine. Percy traps him using Procrustes' own stretching equipment and then decapitates him with Riptide. In the TV series, Procrustes is portrayed by Julian Richings.
- Sciron – Sciron was a thief and son of Poseidon. He had previously fought Theseus in the past. In The House of Hades, Sciron and his giant turtle waylaid the Argo II on the coast of Croatia. Like his fight with Theseus, Hazel defeated Sciron by pushing him off of the cliff where he was gobbled by the Giant Sea Turtle.
- Semele – Semele is the mother of Dionysus. In The Court of the Dead, Semele was revealed to have faded until she is restored by Hecate which filled Dionysus with tears of joy.
- Suitors of Penelope – Suitors of Penelope are men who competed to become the next wife to Penelope when they believed that she became a widow when Odysseus was fighting in the Trojan War. When Odysseus returned, his disguised appearance spoke to Penelope to hold a contest where the Suitor that can string Odysseus' bow will become her new husband. When Odysseus won the contest, he sheds his disguise and kills the Suitors with the help of Telemachus and Philoeteus. In The Blood of Olympus, Jason, Piper, and Annabeth encounter the ghosts of the Suitors of Penelope on Ithaca, where they are now allied with Gaea. After their true identities are revealed by the ghost of Michael Varus, the three destroy the Suitors.
  - Antinous – Antinous is one of the suitors of Penelope.
  - Eurymachus – Eurymachus is one of the suitors of Penelope.
- Theseus – Theseus was a Hero who was the son of Poseidon and younger than Percy had assumed. When Nico was trying to summon Bianca in The Battle of the Labyrinth, he ended up summoning the spirit of Theseus.

=== Other Greco-Roman beings ===
==== Greco-Roman humanoids ====
Many of the beings and creatures of Greco-Roman myths are humanoid; they possess both the intelligence and some of the physical features of humans. The vast majority of these creatures are friendly, such as nymphs and centaurs. Unlike most Greek creatures, these beings are also unquestionably sentient and tend to have large roles in the novel series.

- Agrius and Oreius – Agrius and Oreius were humanoid bears who were born from Polyphonte and a bear due to the power of Aphrodite. They were also the great-grandsons of Ares due to Polyphonte being Ares' granddaughter. The two served as Luke's henchmen in The Sea of Monsters but were killed by the Party Ponies and Blackjack.
- Amazons – Amazons are a tribe of female warriors who usually worshiped goddesses like Hera and Artemis. Some Amazons appear in The Son of Neptune, where they are sent to their compound at Reyna's request. They also run the billion-dollar Amazon.com, which they use as a source of cover and revenue. Though they are often confused with the Hunters of Artemis, the Amazons are not misandrists and like men just fine; they are just a very matriarchal society in which their male spouses are made to work in manual labor while the Amazons work as administrators. In The Blood of Olympus, the Amazons collaborate with the Hunters of Artemis to protect Reyna from Orion, resulting in many casualties.
  - Doris – Doris is an Amazon who is loyal to Otrera. In The Son of Neptune, she and Lulu guarded Percy and Frank.
  - Hylla Ramírez-Arellano – Hylla is the older sister of Reyna, the praetor of Camp Jupiter. She is a demigod daughter of Bellona and the Amazon Queen. She looks a lot like Reyna with glossy black hair and black eyes, long lashes, and a scar on her forehead. She as her sister had the bearing of a swordswoman but stronger. Hylla wears a black suit with a golden belt. Reyna describes her sister as a "chameleon" because she is always changing. They have similar personalities but Hylla seems more funny and "chill". She was born in Puerto Rico and worked for Circe during the first series with her sister. She also spent a year living with pirates and winning the crew's respect. She had an awful childhood and was always trying to protect her sister from their dad. Her father was in the army and the whole Ramírez-Arellano family was favored by Bellona. While worshiping her, Hylla's father falls in love with the idea of war and Bellona. They have the two kids together. Later, the father shows symptoms of PTSD. It turned out he had become a mania, or an insane soul with the worst qualities, and was no longer human. The mania knocks out Hylla, Reyna think she is dead and unknowingly kills her father, who was, technically, already dead. All that was left was the crazed and obsessed remnants of the soul. In The Blood of Olympus, the Amazons have been working with the Hunters of Artemis who kidnap Reyna and take her to an Amazon headquarters, where Hylla reunites with her sister. Orion breaks into the Amazon HQ and kills every Hunter and Amazon, but the girls escape to their old house, and try to defeat Orion without success. Hylla orders Reyna to leave because she had to stay in combat with the supervivients, hunters, and some Amazons. Though she is never seen afterwards, Orion later confirms that Hylla is still alive, to Reyna's relief. In the TV series, she is portrayed by Jasmine Vega.
  - Kinzie – Kinzie was an Amazon who was the daughter of a nymph and is close and loyal to Hylla. She disarmed Percy and sent Frank flying across the room in The Son of Neptune. Kinzie also cornered Percy during the Feast of Fortuna and asked Percy out, though he declined. In The Blood of Olympus, Kinzie is killed by Orion.
  - Lulu – Lulu is an Amazon guard who is loyal to Otrera. In The Son of Neptune, Lulu and Doris guarded Percy and Frank.
  - Otrera – Otrera was a daughter of Euros and the first Queen of the Amazons who was originally killed by Bellerophon. In The Son of Neptune, she is revealed to be among those who emerged from the Doors of Death. She challenged Hylla for the title of Queen of the Amazons. When she planned to defeat Hylla, Otrera plans to have the Amazons help Gaea and the Giants destroy Camp Jupiter. Hylla manages to defeat Otrera twice until Thanatos is freed from the chains where he was trapped, making sure she would not rise from the dead and challenge her again.
- Arachne – Arachne was a weaver who was turned into a spider by Athena after she got angry when Arachne won in a weaving contest against her. In The Mark of Athena, Arachne appears as a spider-like monster who is the last obstacle for Annabeth's quest to the Athena Parthenos and is in collaboration with Otus and Ephialtes. Annabeth challenges Arachne to a weaving contest where Annabeth tricks Arachne into making monster-sized Chinese handcuffs which Annabeth places onto Arachne. When Annabeth states to Arachne that the Athena Parthenos will restore Mount Olympus, Arachne goes into a fit and brings down her chamber enough to open a chasm to Tartarus. As Arachne falls down into Tartarus, she manages to ensnare Annabeth at the last minute as she and Percy go down the chasm with Nico promising to meet them at the Doors of Death. In The House of Hades, Arachne ambushes Percy and Annabeth which ended with Percy using Riptide to destroy Arachne.
- Antaeus – Antaeus was a half-giant who is the son of Poseidon and Gaea. He was invincible as long as he maintained contact with the ground, so Percy defeated him by hanging him in the air with chains and then killing him.
- Argus – Argus is a humanoid figure with eyes all over his body and works as a security guard at Camp Half-Blood. He rarely speaks as he is said to have an eye on his tongue. He cares for Hera a lot because she is his creator.
- Blemmyae – Blemmyae are a race of headless people with their facial features on their chest.
  - Nanette – Nanette was a Blemmyes who works for Triumvirate Holdings. In The Dark Prophecy, Nanette tries to arrest Apollo, Calypso, and Leo in the name of Triumvirate Holdings but is destroyed by the Waystation's traps. However, she quickly reforms. Apollo later tricks her into carrying a bomb toward the Cave of Trophonius where she meets her end.
- Cacus – Cacus was a fire-breathing giant and the son of Hephaestus. In Percy Jackson and the Staff of Hermes, Cacus had stolen Hermes' caduceus. He later attacked Percy and Annabeth and implied that he was working for Gaea, although he did not give her name, to shut down the gods communications. He is destroyed by Percy using the caduceus' Laser Mode, in reality a giant rocket launcher that fires energy blasts.
- Centaur – Centaurs are half-man, half-horse creatures, often depicted as wild and drunk. Chiron is the only truly civilized centaur. Many of his kin are part of the Party Ponies. There are other centaurs who work for Gaea's army.
  - Cyprian Centaurs – Cyprian Centaurs are a race of centaurs with cattle-like horns who are half palomino and originate from Cyprus. They were born after Zeus accidentally impregnated Gaea. These centaurs enjoy killing demigods. In The Son of Neptune, they attacked Camp Jupiter, but most were either killed or retreated.
  - Party Ponies – Party Ponies are an extended family of rowdy centaurs who reside in the United States with chapters hailing from each respective state. They are key players in two major incidents in the series. In The Sea of Monsters, they go along with Chiron and rescue Percy from Luke during their duel on the Princess Andromeda. In The Last Olympian, they help Chiron and the others fight the major battle between the gods and the Titans.
    - Larry
    - Owen
- Cyclopes – Cyclopes are a race of one-eyed giants who have four species as mentioned in The Lost Hero. The first group of Cyclopes are the Elder Cyclops who are the sons of Gaea and Ouranos. They and the Hekatonkheires were imprisoned in Tartarus by Ouranos. They are friendly and help the gods ever since the Titanomachy when they were freed from their imprisonment. The second group of Cyclopes are Poseidon's Cyclopes who are the children of Poseidon and mostly work in his underwater forge. Tyson is one of these. The third group of Cyclopes is the Southern Cyclopes, who are also the children of Poseidon. They largely raise goats and live in caves. The fourth group of Cyclopes is the Northern Cyclopes, who helped the Titans make weapons and are smarter than the southern group of Cyclopes. Several northern Cyclopes were seen fighting with Kronos' army in The Battle of Manhattan. In The Dark Prophecy, many Cyclopes were present at the rehearsal of Commodus' naming ceremony.
  - Grunk – Grunk is a Cyclops who is loyal to Caligula. In The Burning Maze, he was seen by Apollo and Piper playing volleyball with some mortal mercenaries. Piper sings them a song to distract them so that they can get away.
  - Ma Gasket – Ma Gasket was a female Cyclops of the Northern Cyclops faction who is the mother of Sump and Torque. She appears in The Lost Hero when Jason, Piper, and Leo visit her factory, Monocle Motors in Detroit. She is destroyed when Leo drops an engine on her, but due to the Doors of Death being open, she quickly begins reforming. In The Son of Neptune, Ma Gasket leads the Cyclopes in an attack on Camp Jupiter, but is destroyed for a second time by Tyson.
    - Sump – Sump is a son of Ma Gasket who appears in The Lost Hero.
    - Torque – Torque is a son of Ma Gasket who appears in The Lost Hero.
  - Polyphemus – Polyphemus is a Cyclops of the Southern Faction. Percy and his friends encounter him on an island in The Sea of Monsters. He is shown to be blind and there was also a reference about Odysseus being responsible for blinding him under the alias of "Nobody". Grover ended up on his island where he tried to pass off as a female Cyclops as long as possible. This led to his confrontation with Percy. When Polyphemus tries to pray to Poseidon to get revenge on Percy for hurting him, Percy states that Poseidon is also his father. He later tried to eat them only for them to escape. However, Polyphemus sinks their ship in the process unaware that Rainbow's Hippocampus group rescued them at the last minute as Polyphemus boasts that he bested "Nobody". In The House of Hades, Annabeth falls victim to a curse of blindness that the arai lay upon her due to Polyphemus cursing Annabeth for using her invisibility to trick him. Bob the Titan is able to cure Annabeth of the affliction. In The Hidden Oracle, it is suggested that Leo, Festus, and Calypso had a run in with Polyphemus while they were stuck in the Sea of Monsters. In The Sea of Monsters film, Polyphemus is portrayed by Robert Maillet and voiced by Ron Perlman. He is shown to be half-blind where he appears to be slowly recovering from it. When Luke fell into his cave during the fight, Polyphemus can detect him. In the TV series, Polyphemus is portrayed by Aleks Paunovic. Like the film, he is shown to be half-blind. In addition, he is shown to match anybody's voice which he did to impersonate Grover and fool Clarisse. He later fought Tyson who managed to defeat him. Tyson told Percy that Polyphemus "won't be a problem anymore".
  - Unnamed Cyclopes Group – A group of Cyclopes once abducted a younger Annabeth. They would later be taken down by Thalia. In The Sea of Monsters film, two of the Cyclopes that attacked Thalia, Luke, Annabeth, and Grover outside of Camp Half-Blood were portrayed by Derek Mears and Aleks Paunovic. In the TV series, three Cyclopes appeared where the one that spoke was portrayed by Brody Romhanyi.
- Cynocephali – Cynocephali are a race of dog-headed men from India. In The Blood of Olympus, Octavius obtained some Cynocephali from Triumvirate Holdings. In The Dark Prophecy, the Cynocephali are seen at the naming rehearsal held by Commodus as he prepares to invade the Waystation. In The Tyrant's Tomb, the Cynocephali are amongst the monsters used in Caligula's attack on Camp Jupiter. In The Sun and the Star, Nico and Will face a number of the creatures in Tartarus, particularly after Will accidentally breaks some regeneration pods containing them. However, with the help of Small Bob most are killed and the rest are driven off.
- Echidna – Echidna was the wife of Typhon and the mother of Cerberus, Chimera, Hydra, the Nemean Lion, and Ladon, as well as several others not in the series. She is part woman, part snake. She is first seen in The Lightning Thief as an old lady who owned a chihuahua which was actually Chimera in disguise. She assisted Chimera in fighting Percy at the top of the St. Louis Arch. She and the Chimera disappeared after Percy dove into the water. In The Sun and the Star, it is revealed that Echidna worked for Gaea during the Second Giant War and she threw Nico into Tartarus. In the TV series, Echidna is portrayed by Suzanne Cryer.
- Empousai – Empousai are seductive shapeshifting women who are similar in appearance to vampires, but have one shaggy donkey leg and one bronze leg. Two Empusa pose as cheerleaders in The Battle of the Labyrinth. In The Last Olympian, an unnamed Empousai appears as part of the truce party along with Prometheus, Morrain, and Ethan. She stated that she was released from Pandora's pithos.
  - Kelli – Kelli was an Empousai who poses as a cheerleader in The Battle of the Labyrinth. She was killed by Annabeth. In The House of Hades, Kelli is among the Empousai that make their way to the Doors of Death so that Kelli can get even with Percy. However, Bob the Titan suddenly drops on Kelli and crushes her flat.
  - Seraphone – Seraphone was an Empousai who distrusted Kelli and feared Hecate. In The House of Hades, Seraphone was among the Empousai that make their way to the Doors of Death. When they attack Percy and Annabeth, Annabeth tricks the Empousai into believing that Kelli was useless and weak and that she was leading them all into danger. Annabeth tells them to follow Seraphone as she was older and wiser. Hearing this made Seraphone happy and declared that she was the leader. Kelli became angry and killed Seraphone.
  - Tammi – Tammi was an Empousai who posed as a cheerleader in The Battle of the Labyrinth. She was killed by Percy.
- Eurynomos – Eurynomos are ghoulish creatures from the Underworld who can induce a lethal wasting disease with their claws. When a Eurynomos eats the flesh off a dead person, they rise as a skeleton warrior. In The Tyrant's Tomb, Lester and Meg are attacked by one while en route to Camp Jupiter. Before it can eat them and Jason's corpse, they are saved by Lavinia. Apollo is injured in the process and slowly wastes away with Camp Jupiter's healers being unable to cure him due to Apollo's latent godly nature. At the last minute, Apollo is healed by Diana, the Roman form of his sister Artemis.
  - Caelius – Caelius was a Eurynomos who is loyal to Tarquin. In The Tyrant's Tomb, Caelius mentions Tarquin's upcoming attack on Camp Jupiter. He is beheaded by Hazel.
- The Fates – The Fates are the personification of destiny and are controllers of the Threads of Life. In The Lightning Thief, Percy and Grover encounter them at an old-fashioned fruit stand. In The Last Olympian, the Fates take Luke's dead body away after the Second Olympian War. In The Blood of Olympus, the Fates are seen fighting their old enemy Thoon and killing him the same way they did back in the Gigantomachy.
  - Clotho – Clotho is the Fate who spins the Thread of Life. In the TV series, Clotho is portrayed by Cindy Piper.
  - Lachesis – Lachesis is the Fate who measures the Thread of Life. In the TV series, Lachesis is portrayed by La Nein Harrison.
  - Atropos – Atropos is the Fate who cuts the Thread of Life and chooses the manner of the person's death. In the TV series, Atropos is portrayed by Joyce Robbins.
- Faun – Fauns are the Roman counterparts of satyrs. In contrast to Camp Half-Blood's helpful satyrs, fauns are mostly beggars and are often used for amusement purposes.
  - Don – Don was a faun who lived at Camp Jupiter. In The Son of Neptune, Percy and Hazel run into Don who needs money for making up bad lies. When Percy asks why the fauns are not like the satyrs, Don states that fauns are free-spirited. He also detects Percy's empathy link to Grover, but the amnesic Percy does not understand what he's talking about. In The Tyrant's Tomb, Don is a friend of Lavinia's and joins her team to sabotage Caligula's yachts. Although they succeed, Don is mortally wounded in the explosions when he stays behind to ensure that they go off. Don dies and is reincarnated as a beautiful laurel sapling which Apollo orders to be planted and honored as the reincarnation of a Hero.
- The Furies – The Furies are Hades' chief servants and torturers. They personally searched for Hades' Helm of Darkness, believing that Percy had stolen it.
  - Alecto – Alecto acted as Percy's pre-algebra teacher Mrs. Dodds in The Lightning Thief. She is Percy's first true monster encounter and he manages to destroy her with Riptide, although she quickly reforms. In an attempt to protect Percy, Chiron and Grover attempt to convince him that there is no Mrs. Dodds. Alecto later witnesses Percy's fight with Ares and as a result, he's exonerated of stealing Hades' Helm of Darkness which Percy gives to Alecto to return to her master. Alecto orders Percy to be a Hero and to never end up in her clutches again for the wrong reason before leaving with the other Furies. In The Last Olympian, it is revealed Alecto acted as the lawyer who rescued Nico and Bianca from the Lotus Hotel and Casino after sticking them in there in the first place. In the film adaption, Alecto is portrayed by Maria Olsen. In the musical, she is portrayed by Sarah Beth Pfeifer. In the TV series, Alecto is portrayed by Megan Mullally. Her role is expanded where she follows Percy, Annabeth, and Grover to Medusa's lair and had to keep her eyes shielded. Thanks to a trick, Percy used Medusa's head to petrify Alecto in mid-flight enough for her to shatter. She was restored overtime and was confronted in a beach house by Percy following Ares' defeat as he gives her the Helm of Darkness while having her tell Hades to honor their deal.
  - Megaera – Megaera is a Fury representing grudges.
  - Tisiphone – Tisiphone is a Fury representing avenged murder. In the TV series, Tisiphone is portrayed by Sara J. Southey.
- Germani – Germani are the Roman Emperor's elite bodyguards. They come from Germania and are described as being 7-foot-tall and hulking with blond hair and snake tattoos. In The Burning Maze, it is revealed that Caligula uses Pandai and Strix because the Germani are responsible for his mortal death. In The Tower of Nero, after Nero's death, they are rendered mortal and surrender. It is shown that they are left somewhat directionless now that their leader is gone and they have to readjust to the mortal world.
  - Alaric – Alaric was a Germani who briefly worked as a prefect for Commodus. In The Dark Prophecy, Alaric was made a Prefect when Commodus believed that Lityerses was not being effective enough. After his failed strategy during the attack on the Waystation, Alaric was killed by Commodus.
  - Albatrix – Albatrix is a Germani who works for Commodus.
  - Gregorix – Gregorix is a Germani who works for Caligula and Commodus. In The Tyrant's Tomb, he is seen with them during the Battle of San Francisco Bay. He flees following the deaths of the emperors and he is not seen again.
  - Vincius and Garius – Vincius "Vince" and Garius "Gary" hail from Batavia. Their names are Latinized as Nero cannot pronounce their original Germanic names.
  - Vortigern – Vortigern was a Germani who works for Commodus. In The Dark Prophecy, Nero instructed Vortigern and Marcus to take Meg to Commodus. After Meg got away, Commodus was not pleased with their failure and had Lityerses behead them both with his sword.
  - Vercorix – Vercorix is a Germani who works for Nero in The Tower of Nero. After several failed attempt to find the correct remote control for Nero's bombs, he is accidentally shot in the groin by Apollo and disintegrates.
- Geryon – Geryon was described as having a normal head, a face weathered and brown from years in the sun, slick black hair, a pencil-thin moustache, two beefy legs wearing a large pair of Levis. He has three chests, each wearing a different colored shirt: green, yellow, and red. In The Battle of the Labyrinth, he is the owner of Triple G Ranch with Orthrus guarding the ranch. He gave Percy an apparently impossible task: cleaning out the stables of carnivorous horses, one of the Labors of Hercules. Percy managed to complete the task, but Geryon went back on his deal to let Percy's friends free and the two fought. Percy found Geryon a strong opponent, as Geryon's three hearts made him almost impossible to defeat. Percy defeated Geryon with a well-placed arrow that went through Geryon's side hitting all three hearts at once, killing Geryon. Percy is informed that it will take Geryon probably at least a century to reform and Percy suggests that they reshape the ranch for the better so that Geryon will have to work for them when he inevitably returns. Percy initially believes that it was Apollo and Artemis who had helped him to make the shot, but later discovers that it was in fact Hera instead. In The House of Hades, Geryon had cursed Percy to feel the pain that he had when Percy killed him. The arai later told Percy about this. Percy later spotted Geryon amongst the monsters awaiting their turn to go through the Doors of Death. However, the Doors of Death were closed before Geryon could make it back to the mortal world. In The Sun and the Star, Menoetes reveals that Geryon has since reformed. Geryon is dating Menoetes, who suggests that they will both stay in the Underworld to work on Menoetes' farm.
- Ghoul – The Ghouls serve as the security guards in the Underworld and make a sound that is similar to bats. They escort the souls of the wicked to the Fields of Punishment as seen in The Lightning Thief when they take a preacher who had been scamming people there.
- Giant – Giants are human-shaped monsters of great stature and strength. Besides the Cyclopes and the Gigantes, there are different species of giants in Greek mythology.
  - Gegeines – Gegeines are six-armed giants who are 7- to 8-feet tall. They wear leather loincloths and previously fought Jason and the Argonauts. They appear in The Lost Hero, being summoned by Enceladus to fight Jason, Piper, and Leo.
  - Hekatonkheires – Hekatonkheires, the Hundred-Handed Giants have incredible strength, superior even to the Cyclopes. They are taller than mountains and their arms are as thin as noodles. Like the Elder Cyclopes, the Hekatonkheires are the children of Gaea and Ouranos and were hurled into Tartarus by Uranus. The Hekatonkheires and the Elder Cyclopes were later freed by Zeus and assisted him in the Titanomachy. In The Sea of Monsters film, a Hekatonkheires portrayed by Anthony Shim worked as a barista at a coffee shop with a harpy. Its appearance in the film was depicted as having eight arms when in the presence of demigods.
    - Briares – Briares is a Hekatonkheires who was imprisoned on Alcatraz Island by Kampê in The Battle of the Labyrinth. It is mentioned that his brothers Cottus and Gyges have faded because people have forgotten about them. When Tyson finds that Briares is too afraid to escape, he is heartbroken. At the end, Briares returns to help defeat Luke and the Titans. In The Last Olympian, Percy sees Briares helping Poseidon defeat the forces of Oceanus. In The Blood of Olympus, Percy and Jason encounter Briares' wife Kymopoleia and Percy encourages her to give Briares another chance.
  - Hyperborean – Hyperboreans are a race of 30-foot-tall snow giants with blue skin and gray hair who come from Hyperborea. In The Last Olympian, the Hyperboreans are on the side of the Titans. In The Son of Neptune, a group of peaceful Hyperboreans are seen living in Anchorage, Alaska.
    - Morrain – Morrain is a Hyperborean who appeared in The Last Olympian. He was a part of a truce meeting. Morrain was not seen taking part in the Battle of Manhattan and his current fate is unknown.
  - Laistrygonian – Laistrygonians are muscular 8-foot-tall cannibalistic giants who were previously encountered by Odysseus. In The Sea of Monsters, three Laistrygonians serve as the brawn of Kronos' army. Three of them infiltrated Percy's school as visitors from Detroit and attacked the students with flaming dodgeballs. They were defeated by Percy, Annabeth, and Tyson. In The Battle of the Labyrinth, a Laistrygonian assisted Kelli in capturing Percy, Annabeth, and Rachel. Two more Laistrygonians were seen in Daedalus' lair, where they followed Minos and carried Nico with them. When the Titan army made their way through the Labyrinth and attacked Camp Half-Blood, the Laistrygonians were among the monsters who took part in the attack. They were pushed back by the campers in Apollo's cabin and the Laistrygonians retreated when Grover unleashed the powers of Pan. In The Last Olympian, the Laistrygonians were seen in the Battle of Manhattan. When one Laistrygonian tried to attack Sally Jackson, she managed to shoot it. In The Son of Neptune, a large amount of Laistrygonians guard Grandma Zhang's house in anticipation of the arrival of Percy, Frank and Hazel. His memory slowly returning, Percy recalls his encounter with the giants from The Sea of Monsters and calls them Canadians in reference to Annabeth's explanation at the time. With the help of Frank's undead servant Gray, the three manage to break through Laistrygonians and get into the house where Mars reveals that the giants want to eat Frank to get his shapeshifting abilities. The Laistrygonians attack the next morning, destroying the house, but the three demigods manage to escape to an airfield in Grandma Zhang's car, where they board a plane. The three leave behind Ella the harpy and by the time Tyson arrives, the Laistrygonians are gone. Although Frank's grandmother is apparently killed in the attack, she may have managed to escape by shapeshifting into a bird and flying away. Although unmentioned in the books, the Laistrygonians are grandsons of Poseidon in Greek mythology, making them Percy's relatives. In the TV series, they replace Agrius and Oreius as main henchmen.
    - Joe Bob – A Laistrygonian. He is killed by Annabeth. In the TV series, Joe Bob is portrayed by Mark Gibbon. He and his fellow Laistrygonians attacked Camp Half-Blood and was killed by Clarisse.
    - Marrow Sucker – A Laistrygonian. He is killed by Tyson when he throws the Laistrygonians' flaming dodgeballs back at them. In the TV series, Marrow Sucker is portrayed by Dan Payne. He and his fellow Laistrygonians attacked Camp Half-Blood and retreat after Joe Bob was killed. Marrow Sucker later appears on board the Princess Andromeda.
    - Skull Eater – A Laistrygonian. He is eventually destroyed by Tyson who punches him hard in the face. In the TV series, Skull Eater is portrayed by Daniel Cudmore. He and his fellow Laistrygonians attacked Camp Half-Blood and retreat after Joe Bob was killed Skull Eater later appears on board the Princess Andromeda. Skull Eater joined Alison and the demigods with her in targeting Annabeth. He is killed by Clarisse.
    - Chet Jr. – A Laistrygonian who appears in the TV series, portrayed by Mark Gibbon.
    - Brain Eater – A Laistryogonian who appears in the TV series, portrayed by Paul Cheng. He appears on the Princess Andromeda alongside Marrow Sucker and Skull Eater.
    - Spine Crusher – A Laistrygonian who appears in the TV series, portrayed by Kyle Strauts. He is among the Laistrygonians that assist Luke's demigod allies in attacking Camp Half-Blood.
    - Skull Crusher – A Laistrygonian who appears in the TV series, portrayed by Daniel Cudmore. He is among the Laistrygonians that assist Luke's demigod allies in attacking Camp Half-Blood and is allowed passed the barrier by Luke.
- Gorgons – A trio of female humanoid creature with snakes for hair. Anyone who looks at the face of the Gorgon Medusa turns to stone.
  - Medusa – The Gorgon who is the sister of Stheno and Euryale. Under the moniker of "Aunty Em", she attempted to lure Percy, Annabeth, and Grover into a false sense of security and turn them into stone statues as seen in The Lightning Thief. She is defeated and her severed head is mailed to the gods of Olympus as proof of the trio's courage. Though the package was later marked "Return to sender". Percy's mom uses her head to turn Gabe Ugliano to stone. She is mentioned several times throughout the following books and Thalia's shield has a replica of her head on it. In The Last Olympian, Kronos mentions that Medusa has yet to reform. In the film adaptation, Medusa is portrayed by Uma Thurman. After Medusa was beheaded, her head was used to defeat the Hydra. In the TV series, Medusa is portrayed by Jessica Parker Kennedy.
  - Stheno – A Gorgon who is the sister of Medusa and Euryale. In The Lightning Thief, Medusa mentions that her sisters have faded from existence. In The Lost Hero, she is amongst the monsters who were brought back to life when the Doors of Death opened. Stheno is later found to be chasing Percy with her sister Euryale and is described by Percy as appearing as a dumpy old grandmother but with rooster feet and bronze boar tusk sticking out of the corners of her mouth. Percy manages to destroy the gorgons using the Little Tiber, but they later reform in time for the Battle of New Rome. Both are killed in the battle, one by Percy's pet hellhound Mrs. O'Leary. When the gorgons are destroyed the first time, they leave behind two vials of their blood, one of which is later used by Percy to destroy Phineas while the other heals his memories.
  - Euryale – A Gorgon who is the sister of Medusa and Stheno. In The Lightning Thief, Medusa mentions that her sisters have faded from existence. In The Lost Hero, she is amongst the monsters who were brought back to life when the Doors of Death opened. Euryale is later found to be chasing Percy with her sister Stheno. Percy manages to destroy the gorgons using the Little Tiber, but they later reform in time for the Battle of New Rome. Both are killed in the battle, one by Percy's pet hellhound Mrs. O'Leary. When the gorgons are destroyed the first time, they leave behind two vials of their blood, one of which is later used by Percy to destroy Phineas while the other heals his memories.
- Gray Sisters – Women who share one eye and one tooth. In The Sea of Monsters, Percy, Annabeth, and Tyson run into the Gray Sisters who are in the form of three taxi drivers. During the Gray Sisters' argument, Percy manages to grab their eye and demand the location of which they had mentioned. They tell him 30, 31, 75, 12 which Percy did not understand. He however gave the eye to Wasp and they drop the three off at Camp Half-Blood. Later at the campfire, Percy figures out that the numbers were used for longitude and latitude, which leads to the Sea of Monsters. They are seen again in The Tower of Nero transporting Apollo and Meg and in The Sun and the Star transporting Kayla Knowles and Austin Lake into Manhattan from Camp Half-Blood. In the film adaptation, the Gray Sisters are portrayed by Mary Birdsong, Yvette Nicole Brown, and Missi Pyle. In the TV series, the Gray Sisters are portrayed by Sandra Bernhard, Kristen Schaal, and Margaret Cho.
- Harpy – The Harpies are winged spirits of sudden, sharp gusts of wind. They were known as the "Hounds of Zeus" and were dispatched by the god to snatch away people and things from the Earth. Three Harpies work in Camp Half-Blood as "the Cleaning Harpies" being allowed to eat any camper who stays in Camp Half-Blood past noon in the last day of the summer without completing their form or if the camper is caught sneaking out of their cabin at night. In The Titan's Curse, it is shown that there are some Harpies allied with the Titans. In The Sea of Monsters film, a harpy (portrayed by Camille Atebe) worked as a barista at a coffee shop with a Hekatonkheires.
  - Aello – A Harpy whose name means "storm swift". She is a member of Camp Half-Blood's "Cleaning Harpies".
  - Aeolus' Harpies – In The Lost Hero, several unnamed harpies work for Aeolus. They construct a floor in the main studio for Jason, Leo, and Piper to walk on. Mellie does not like them because the harpies are mean sudden gusts, whereas the aurae are all gentle breezes.
  - Celaeno – A Harpy whose name means "the dark". She is a member of Camp Half-Blood's "Cleaning Harpies", and is also known as Podarge (which means "fleet-foot").
  - Ella – A Harpy who appears in The Son of Neptune. She has red hair and feathers, grey eyes, and a bony structure. She has extensive knowledge about the Romans and their culture. Ella is very valuable to the enemy side as she might have knowledge of several scrolls of prophecies. She has memorized a lot of books, and often recites a few prophecies from the Sibylline books that Octavian desperately wants. It is mentioned toward the end of The Son of Neptune, that Ella needed to be hidden from Octavian because of this important knowledge. She was one of the Harpies who was trying to torment the blind psychic Phineas. Near the end of the book, it is revealed that Tyson has a crush on Ella and that she has a crush on Tyson. Because of this, Ella remains with Tyson at Camp Jupiter. After Python's power blocks the Oracles, Ella's knowledge of the Sibylline books becomes vital. In The Tyrant's Tomb, Ella is shown to be in a relationship with Tyson and is transcribing the books by tattooing information onto Tyson's skin. Ella helps Apollo against Triumvirate Holdings with her prophecies and provides Apollo with the first part of a prophecy that he has to seek out the rest of in The Tower of Nero.
  - Ocypete – A Harpy whose name means "swift wing". She is a member of Camp Half-Blood's "Cleaning Harpies".
- Hunters of Artemis – A group of girls who gave up love in exchange for immortality and youthfulness. As their name implies, they are followers of Artemis in her hunts, though a lieutenant is chosen to lead them when Artemis is not around. Members are recruited both from mortals and demigods. They have a strong aversion to males and tend to regard them as disgusting and untrustworthy. However, their immortality will fade if they ever fall in love or "fall in battle". In battles, the hunters primarily use bows and arrows to attack. Zoë serves as the group's lieutenant for over 2,000 years, but after her death in The Titan's Curse, she is succeeded by Thalia. In The Blood of Olympus, many members are massacred by the Gigante Orion (who is not the mythical Orion that Artemis knew) while attempting to give Reyna time to escape from Puerto Rico. In The Tyrant's Tomb, Reyna joins the Hunters.
  - Bianca di Angelo
  - Celyn – A hunter who appears in The Blood of Olympus. She is killed by Orion.
  - Naomi – A daughter of Hecate and another hunter who captures Reyna in The Blood of Olympus. She is killed by Orion.
  - Phoebe – One of the Hunters of Artemis, the best tracker among them. She is suspicious of boys. In The Blood of Olympus, she is revealed to have looked about 14 and to have lived since Artemis first knew Orion. She eventually dies by the hands of Orion.
  - Hemithea – Daughter of King Staphylus of Naxos and granddaughter of Dionysus, she was turned into a god by Apollo alongside her sister Parthenos to escape her father's wrath. She joined the Hunters of Artemis, but later gave up the membership and her immortality with her lover Josephine. The two settled and became protectors of Waystation, where Hemithea became known as "Emmy", and adopted Georgina. She has an interest at plants, with which she quickly befriends Calypso.
  - Josephine – Daughter of Hecate, she was a member of the Hunters until she decided to quit with her lover Hemithea, giving up her immortality in the process. The two became protectors of Waystation and adopted Georgina. She is an expert at mechanics and was previously affiliated with mafia in the early 20th century.
  - Hunter Kowalski – A hunter who attempted to spy on Commodus, she is instead captured and enslaved by him. She is freed by Apollo, Meg, and Leo, and joins them and the others defending the Waystation against Commodus' army.
- Ichthyocentaur – Creatures who resemble centaurs, but with fish tails and horns resembling lobster claws. In The Mark of Athena, the demigods encounter the Ichthyocentaurs who save them from Keto and her children. The Ichthyocentaurs also run a camp for merpeople heroes.
  - Aphros – An Ichthyocentaur who is the half-brother of Chiron. He teaches home economics.
  - Bythos – An Ichthyocentaur who is the half-brother of Chiron. He teaches fighting.
- Kampê – A snake-haired winged centauroid creature who is half-woman half-dragon with the heads of various animals growing from her torso. She who imprisoned the Hundred-Handed Ones and Cyclopes during the First Great War. She is feared by all, and is defeated by Briares in The Battle of the Labyrinth by being crushed by boulders. Her scimitars are taken by Camp Half-Blood and stored in the attic as spoils of war as seen in The Last Olympian.
- Kerkopes – Two brothers who are the children of Oceanus and Theia. They worked as thieves until they were caught by Hercules and turned into monkeys by Zeus. In The House of Hades, the Kerkopes have set up shop in Bologna, Italy. When the Argo II docks there, the Kerkopes attacked the ship and robbed it, taking things like an Archimedes Sphere and Piper's dagger Katoptris. Leo and Jason chase them and at the Fountain of Neptune, they incapacitated Jason by trapping him in a net. Leo chases them to their hideout and defeats them with a home-made flash-bang grenade. He then got their possessions back and agreed not to kill Passalos and Akmon on the condition that they go to America and disrupt the Romans to slow down their attack on Camp Half-Blood. Later, in a dream, it is shown that they are being very successful in this goal. As part of the deal, Leo retrieves an almanac belonging to Triptolemus from their treasure, and takes a bronze astrolabe that the Kerkopes had stolen from Odysseus when he was an old man which proves to be vital in Leo's quest to return to Ogygia and rescue Calypso.
- Khromandae – Large, grey-eyed humanoids covered in blonde hair. Khromandae were discovered during Dionysus' invasion of India and communicate via ear-splitting shrieks. They were part of Tarquin, Caligula, and Commodus' army who attacked Camp Jupiter in The Tyrant's Tomb.
- Lamia – The daughter of Hecate who was one of the former love interests of Zeus until Hera turned her into a monster after the death of her children. In The Son of Magic, Lamia is revived by Gaea to kill Hecate's son Alabaster Torrington. Alabaster manages to defeat Lamia until Hecate arrives to save both her children. According to Hecate, Lamia will not try attacking Alabaster again knowing he could use that spell against her.
- Leontocephaline – A creation of Mithras who resembles a lion-headed humanoid entwined with a snake that has no head and no tail. In The Tower of Nero, he acts as the guard of Nero's fasces, requiring the sacrifice of a being's immortality to give it to them which Nero thinks is the perfect defense as he believes Apollo will not give up his own immortality to defeat him. Instead, Lu offers her immortality which is actually Nero's immortality due to their link. Intrigued, the creature gives her the weapon, making Lu mortal and allowing Apollo to kill Nero.
- Lotus-eaters – A group of humans who were previously encountered by Odysseus. A number of them run the Lotus Hotel and Casino in The Lightning Thief. The hotel is filled with arcade games that makes visitors not want to leave alongside the lotus cookies they serve. It is later revealed that Bianca and Nico were hidden in their casino for decades by Hades to protect them and keep them from aging. In the TV series, the Lotus-eaters also filled the air of the Lotus Hotel and Casino with the lotus scents.
- Lycanthropes – Humans who were turned into werewolves and can only be killed by silver. They were created by Zeus after the first Lycanthrope Lycaon tried to feed him human flesh and then hired assassins to target Zeus in his sleep to test his immortality. They appear as the servants of Gaea and her giant son Orion in The Lost Hero and The Blood of Olympus.
  - King Lycaon – A king who was turned into a wolf by Zeus for testing his immortality. He first appears in his wolf form with his pack in The Lost Hero trying to kidnap Jason and kill Leo and Piper. However, they are thwarted when the Hunters of Artemis arrive and drive off the werewolves. Lycaon is injured by Thalia and so he does not take part in the final battle at the Wolf House alongside the other werewolves. In The Blood of Olympus, Lycaon and his pack serve the giant Orion, hunting Reyna, Nico and Coach Hedge for him. The werewolves corner the three in Portugal, but Nico manages to kill Lycaon by stabbing him in the heart with Reyna's silver pocketknife. Lycaon melts into a pool of darkness which Nico then uses to shadow travel himself, his companions and the Athena Parthenos away from the remaining werewolves and Orion.
- Maenad – Several Maenads appeared in "Leo Valdez and the Quest for Buford". They are seen skipping in a mall-shaped clearing in the Camp Half-Blood Forest. When a Drakon attacks them, the Maenads manage to easily kill it.
- Merpeople – A race of sea creatures who are half-human and half-fish. The male merfolk are called Mermen and the female merfolk are called Mermaids. They serve Poseidon. In The Last Olympian, Percy wakes up underwater near Atlantis where he sees various Merpeople in battle armor fighting the forces of Oceanus.
  - Bill – A merman who was trained at "Camp Fish-Blood" (as Leo called it) by Aphros and Bythos.
- Minotaur/Asterion – The Minotaur is part-man, part bull. The monster of the labyrinth who chased Percy all the way to Camp Half-Blood. Percy defeats the monster atop Half-Blood hill and claims its broken horn as a spoil of war which he keeps and later hangs on his cabin wall. The Minotaur returns in The Last Olympian as a general for Kronos' army at Williamsburg Bridge and now wearing armor. It was defeated by Percy again. In The House of Hades, the Minotaur's history is mentioned after Piper and Leo encounter his mother at the Doors of Death. In The Court of the Dead, the Minotaur has returned again, but this time seeking a new path in life. Now going by his birth name of Asterion, he shows remorse for his past actions, does not have a grudge against Percy, and a desire to change for the better. At the end of the book, Asterion settles at Camp Jupiter with other monsters or mythics who feel the same way. In the film adaptation, the Minotaur's head resembles a cape buffalo's head. In the TV series, the Minotaur was depicted as having ears like an American Brahman.
- Nymphs – Female, magical beings usually associated with some natural feature. Many different kinds of nymphs are seen in Rick Riordan's novels, including naiads (river nymphs), dryads (tree nymphs), and aurae (wind nymphs).
  - Aurae – Wind spirits who work at Camp Jupiter as seen in The Son of Neptune.
    - Mellie – An aurae who is the wife of Coach Hedge and the mother of Chuck Hedge. She is the personal assistant of Aeolus as seen in The Lost Hero. At the end, she works as Piper's dad's assistant Tristan McLean. In The Burning Maze, Mellie appeared at the Aeithales where she greets Apollo and Grover. After hearing of Jason's death, she and Coach Hedge head to Malibu to help a grieving Piper. When on the airfield, Mellie tells her family that she will be going to the McLean family's home in Oklahoma.
  - Cloud Nymphs – The Cloud Nymphs are mentioned briefly in the series, particularly in The Heroes of Olympus.
    - Fleecy – A cloud nymph who works at Iris' co-op. She appears in The Son of Neptune. She manages Iris-messaging after Iris begins focusing on her shop. Fleecy is described as young, with frizzy white hair and eyes that change colors from gray to white to black.
  - Dryad – Nymphs who are associated with trees and forests.
    - Agave – A Dryad who sent Grover to explore the Labyrinth. In The Burning Maze, Agave and Money Maker were found in the burning maze by Grover and those with him. Grover takes them back to Aeithales and Agave is healed while Money Maker dies of her injuries.
    - Aloe Vera – A caring Dryad who lives in Aeithales near Palm Springs. In The Burning Maze, Aloe Vera tends to Apollo and Meg when they arrive and even tends to them following an attack by Medea.
    - Daphne – A dryad whom Apollo fell in love with. Eros, after a conflict with Apollo, shot an arrow that made the latter fall in love with Daphne, yet at the same time shot an arrow that made Daphne hate him. She ran away and, realizing that Apollo would never give up, asked Gaea to transform her into a tree. Apollo still grieves for Daphne's fate, which he considered one of his two greatest losses, and is frequently haunted by visions of her and other dryads blaming him.
    - Joshua – A laid-back and nature-loving Dryad who lives in Aeithales near Palm Springs. According to Apollo, male Dryads like Joshua are rare. In The Burning Maze, Joshua greets Apollo and Meg when they arrive. Meg has a crush on Joshua, and Apollo attempts to give her advice on how to catch his eye, but is ignored and he tells Meg that she is being super obvious.
    - Juniper – A Dryad who is Grover's girlfriend. In The Battle of the Labyrinth, she informs Percy that she has seen Luke using the entrance to the Labyrinth and that she has also seen Daedalus using the entrance to the Labyrinth.
    - Meliae – The Dryads of the ash tree. They were born when Kronos castrated Ouranos and his blood fell to Gaea. They eventually died, but were reincarnated as seeds. The Meliae were found by Phillip McCaffrey, who was determined to restore them. After Caligula destroyed the greenhouse that Philip was going to plant their seeds, a saguaro cactus named Hercules hid the seeds. In The Burning Maze, Meg found the seeds, planted them and they helped to slay Incitatus and the Pandai soldiers with him. Then the Meliai transplanted themselves and put their roots around the pool at the ruins of Aeithales. Their magic worked so well that Aeithales rebuilt itself in a day.
    - Money Maker – A Dryad who sent Grover to explore the Labyrinth. In The Burning Maze, Money Maker and Agave were found in the burning maze by Grover and those with him. He takes them back to Aeithales. While Agave is healed, Money Maker dies from her burns.
    - Prickly Pear – A rough and crabby Dryad who lives in the Aeithales near Palm Springs. In The Burning Maze, Prickly Pear greets Apollo and Meg when they arrive and scolds Grover.
  - The Hesperides – The daughters of the Titan Atlas and the sea goddess Pleione who tend to the Garden of the Hesperides which is accessible only during sunset. They are described as looking identical to their estranged sister Zoë who was originally a part of them before she became disowned for supporting the gods during the Titan War. They briefly reunite with Zoë and then accompanying Percy and the others in heading to Mount Tamalpais in The Titan's Curse. They warned them that they will not be a match against Atlas and pulled the Ladon card. Zoë retaliates by waking Ladon with a shout, and calling her sisters cowards when they chided her for insanity. As Zoë distracted Ladon to help Percy and Thalia evade it, the oldest of the Hesperides called Zoë a fool and they disappeared.
  - Naiads – Nature spirits who inhabit streams and rivers and lakes, or any fresh body of water.
    - Brooke – A naiad who inhabits the brook in Camp Half-Blood. Gave a warning to Leo, Piper, and Jason about her "Crazy Cousins" in Leo Valdez and the Quest for Buford.
  - Nereids – A race of sea nymphs.
    - Eudora – A Nereid who Percy encounters in the Mississippi River after escaping from Echidna and the Chimera. When Percy, Annabeth, and Grover arrive at Santa Monica Beach, Eudora provides them with Poseidon's Pearls which will help them get out of the Underworld. In Chalice of the Gods, Eudora appears as a substitute school counselor. Eudora is portrayed by Jelena Milinovic in the TV series.
  - Oreads – A race of mountain nymphs.
    - Echo – An Oread who loved her voice. Zeus fell in love with Echo causing Hera to curse Echo into repeating everything she says. She did have an encounter with Narcissus at the time when he was admiring his reflection in the water. When Echo evaded the love advances of Pan, she was killed by some panicked shepherds and her fragments were scattered by Gaea. In The Mark of Athena, Leo and Hazel encounter Echo on a small island, where they were looking for lime and Celestial Bronze to repair the damaged Argo II. Echo helps Leo get the Celestial Bronze from the lake as Leo makes insults toward Narcissus which Echo repeats. Before Leo leaves, Echo kisses him and briefly becomes more visible; Leo describes her as beautiful, but forgettable.
- Palikoi – Geyser gods who in times past were worshiped by runaway slaves for protection. Others can make oaths with them. While oaths toward Styx are prolonged and cancerous, a single breach of oath with the Palikoi will result in immediate death.
  - Pete – Pete is a Palikoi employed by a marketing company. He is tasked to operate in the Woods of the Camp Half-Blood while collecting surveys on customer service. Apollo makes an oath with Pete to rescue Meg who is kidnapped by the Myrmekes.
  - Paulie – Paulie is Pete's fellow worker in a marketing company. He is kidnapped by Nero who intends to use his power to break through the Grove of Dodona's walls. Apollo is able to rescue him along with the other abducted demigods.
- Pandai – A long-living warlike tribe from an Indian mountain valley with big ears, eight fingers, eight toes, and white hair covering their body. In The Burning Maze, Caligula uses Pandai and Strix because the Germani were responsible for his mortal death.
  - Amax
  - Crest – Crest was a Pandai who is one of the bodyguards of Caligula. Unlike most of the Pandai, Crest was more interested in music. He later dies buying Apollo time to get away from Medea.
  - Flange – Flange was a Pandai who is a messenger for Caligula. Flange was killed by Caligula when he hears that the attack on Camp Jupiter has failed.
  - Peak
  - Reverb
  - Timber
  - Wah-Wah
- Satyr – Half man, half goat. Most of the Satyrs work at Camp Half-Blood. Their Roman counterpart are the Fauns. Grover and Coach Hedge are satyrs.
  - Augustus – A satyr who is exclusive to the TV series where he is portrayed by Ted Dykstra. He was depicted as a friend of Grover's family who was looking for Pan only to end up at the Lotus Hotel and Casino.
  - Council of Cloven Elders – A group of Satyrs whose main duty is to abide over the Satyrs' search for Pan. The Council of Cloven Elders reside in the forum within Camp Half-Blood's forest are responsible for determining which Satyrs are worthy of receiving a searchers' license. To achieve a searcher's license, a Satyr must be a successful protector and bring a demigod to Camp Half-Blood alive.
    - Leneus – Leneus was a member of the Council of Cloven Elders. He hated Grover and though he was a liar. Leneus is killed in The Last Olympian and is reincarnated as a laurel. When he dies, Grover takes his place in the Council of Cloven Elders. In the TV series, Leneus is portrayed by Garfield Wilson.
    - Maron – A member of the Council of Cloven Elders. He only appears in The Battle of the Labyrinth, when he, Silenus and Leneus try to exile Grover because they think that Pan is still alive and Grover is lying about his death. He and the other members of the council are described as being old and fat satyrs. In the TV series, Maron is portrayed by Jason Gray-Stanford.
    - Silenus – Silenus is the leader of the Council of Cloven Elders and is shown to hate Grover calling him an "outcast" and a "liar". He also has suspicions that Grover is a spy.
  - Ichneutae – Ichneutae was a satyr who is exclusive to The Sea of Monsters film, portrayed by Jordan Weller. Ichneutae was present when Clarisse won the obstacle tower. He was chosen by Dionysus to guide her to the Golden Fleece. Clarisse mentioned that he was eaten by Scylla and his last words were "I got this".
  - Lysas – A satyr who was mentioned to have been the chosen one of Pan where he was tasked by the god himself to spread the word that "The great god Pan has died". Even though he refused to believe this, he spread the word to the world in Ephesos. In The Lightning Thief, Grover mentions that a sailor off the coast of Ephesos heard a mysterious cry saying that Pan has died. It is revealed in The Battle of the Labyrinth that it was a satyr called Lysas.
  - Millard and Herbert – Two satyrs sent by Chiron to find and alert Rachel to visit Camp Half-Blood in The Hidden Oracle. While Rachel is successfully clued in, she states that the satyrs came to her wounded and died soon afterward.
  - Uncle Ferdinand – Grover's uncle who was one of the victims of Medusa in the Garden Gnome Emporium. When Kronos' army was hiding out there in The Last Olympian, his statue form is now missing an arm and has graffiti on it without Medusa to watch over it.
  - Woodrow – A satyr and Camp Half-Blood's music instructor as seen in The Hidden Oracle. He is afraid of Apollo due to the latter's apparent history of flaying a satyr due to his loss in a musical contest which Apollo himself vehemently denies.
- Scythian Dracaenae – A race of humanoid females with twin snake tails in place of legs. They make up a considerable portion of the Titan Lord's forces. In The Sea of Monsters, Percy first encounters them on the Princess Andromeda. In The Titan's Curse, some Scythian Dracaenae attacked Percy's group after he had defeated Atlas. In The Battle of the Labyrinth, Percy fights a Scythian Dracaenae in Antaeus' lair. Percy almost immediately kills it much to Antaeus' disapproval. The Scythian Dracaenae also show up in the actual Battle of the Labyrinth as one of the main types of soldiers. In The Last Olympian, the Scythian Dracaenae are seen taking part in the Titan Army's attack on Manhattan.
  - Queen Sess – The Queen of the Scythian Dracaenae who appears in The Last Olympian. She fought Chiron alongside Kronos and was killed when Chiron fired one of his arrows in between Queen Sess' eyes.
  - Sssssarah – A Scythian Dracaenae. In The Dark Prophecy, she was freed from Commodus by Lester, Leo, and Calypso and is shown to be friendly. She settles at the Waystation.
- Troglodytes – Reptilian humanoids who live underground and have an obsession with hats. In The Tower of Nero, the Troglodytes encounter Apollo, Meg, Rachel, and Will in their tunnels. They later partook in the fight at Nero's tower. When Nico and Will plan to travel into Tartarus to rescue Bob the Titan, the two explain that the troglodytes can help them as they can dig in and out of anywhere safely, even Tartarus. In The Sun and the Star, it is revealed that Nico relocated the Troglodytes to the Underworld after the destruction of their previous home and they've set up a new home on the shores of the River Styx. Screech-Bling and Hiss-Majesty help Nico and Will get into Tartarus through their shortcut, the River Acheron. The Troglodytes invite both demigods to visit them when they return from Tartarus and depart before they can get emotional over the goodbye.
  - Screech-Bling – Screech-Bling is a Troglodyte who dresses like George Washington. He serves as his kind's CEO. He later helps Nico and Will get into Tartarus.
  - Click-Wrong – Click-Wrong is a Troglodyte who is the group's cook and wears a chef hat.
  - Creak-Morris – Creak-Morris is a Troglodyte.
  - Grr-Fred – Grr-Fred is a Troglodyte who is the CSO of his kind. He has been shown to wear a cowboy hat, a firefighter hat, and a police hat.
  - Hiss-Majesty – Hiss-Majesty is a non-binary Troglodyte who befriends Will during The Sun and the Star. They are shown to be very fast, helping to guide Nico's sword in taking down a drakon, much to their companions' surprise. Before parting ways, Hiss-Majesty reveals that they intend to work as a cow herder for Menoetes which they credit Will with.
- Zombie – Several zombies were seen as passengers on the Princess Andromeda in The Sea of Monsters. Clarisse used the zombies of Confederate soldiers to operate the CSS Birmingham.
  - Jules-Albert – Jules-Albert is an undead race car driver given to Nico by Hades as a gift. Jules Albert acts as Nico's chauffeur and is used by Nico in The Blood of Olympus to transport himself, Leila, and Dakota to Camp Half-Blood since none of them know how to drive.

==== Greco-Roman creatures ====
- Amphisbaena – Amphisbaena was a snake with another snake head at its end. In The Tower of Nero, Apollo encounters one in the subway. When he grabs it, it recites part of the Terza Rima prophecy before being killed by the Gaul Luguselwa.
- Apollo's Cattle – Apollo's Cattle are the sacred cattle herd of Apollo. In The Battle of the Labyrinth, Apollo's Cattle were seen at the Triple G Ranch under Geryon's care since Apollo never has time to take care of them. Apollo was unaware that he was using some of the cattle for meat and feeding them to the monsters who work for Kronos. Although Apollo did not have any cattle in actual Greek mythology, these cattle are based on the Cattle of Helios.
- Arai – Arae are winged female daemons who inhabit Tartarus. They are similar to the Furies, but their number is not limited to three, and they are under control of Nyx instead of Hades. The spirits carry the grudge of anyone whom their killer have wronged; when Percy kills some of them, they release the grudges of Kampê's death and Calypso's isolation in Ogygia.
- Arion – Arion is a horse, son of Neptune and Ceres, making him Percy's half-brother. He appears in The Son of Neptune when Hazel frees him from the Amazons. He is described as having a tan coat with a black mane and tail. He is a free spirit and seems to have a bad temper, being known to curse when his abilities are challenged. After Hazel frees him, Arion becomes her steed, although he is known to reluctantly let others ride him at Hazel's request. In The Tyrant's Tomb, he rescues Frank from the inferno that he caused to kill Caligula after Frank's apparent death. In The Court of the Dead, Hazel continues to ride Arion who helps her to stop Pirithous from escaping.
- Automaton – Highly developed robots with intricate circuitry that makes them hard to fix. Most are made out of steel, but some are made out of celestial bronze or other materials. In Percy Jackson & the Olympians, Annabeth discovers that many statues in Manhattan are actually automatons created by Daedalus, an army that could either defend or attack Olympus.
  - Argentum – Argentum is Reyna's silver Automaton hound who appears in The Son of Neptune, The Mark of Athena, The House of Hades, and The Blood of Olympus.
  - Aurum – Aurum is Reyna's gold Automaton Hound who appears in The Son of Neptune, The Mark of Athena, The House of Hades, and The Blood of Olympus.
  - Celedon – Celedon are automatons forged by Hephaestus to serve as Apollo's backup singers. In Percy Jackson and the Singer of Apollo, Percy had to find the fourth Celedon for Apollo after it left Mount Olympus and fled into Times Square.
  - Colossus of Nero – A gigantic automaton built under Nero's orders in the images of Apollo and himself. Nero uses the statue to invade Camp Half-Blood in The Hidden Oracle. The Colossus proceeds to destroy the Dining Area and Demeter's Cabin before being infected with Apollo's hay fever plague arrow and subsequently decapitated. The headless statue is then given to Poseidon to be repurposed, likely into a statue of Poseidon himself.
  - Mechanical Spiders – A group of automaton spiders created by Hephaestus.
  - Talos – Talos is a giant automaton. Percy, Thalia, and Bianca fight a prototype of Talos in the Junkyard of the Gods. Apparently, he has a manhole at the base of his foot for servicing. Bianca went in to mess up his circuit so they could defeat him. He fell on some power lines, electrocuting Bianca.
- Basilisk – Basilisk are fire-breathing snakes with colorful spikes and poisonous bites. In The Son of Neptune, they attacked Camp Jupiter, but Frank shapeshifts into a mongoose (or weasel) and scares them off. In The Blood of Olympus, several attack Percy and Jason under the sea while more are in Nyx's monster army in Tartarus in The Sun and the Star.
- Buford – Buford is a walking table who Leo saved from a supply closet and prefers to be polished by Lemon Pledge instead of Windex. He assists Leo in constructing the Argo II in Bunker 9. Eventually, Leo programs a talking mini-hologram of Coach Hedge onto Buford.
- Cacodemons – Cacodemons are demonic balls of darkness created by Nyx in The Sun and the Star, they serve as literal embodiments of Nico's emotions. Affectionately dubbed the Coco Puffs by Nico, they are adopted by him and Will. In The Court of the Dead, the Coco Puffs accompany the couple to Camp Jupiter. They play a vital role in defeating the Court of the Dead and their minions, sharpening the senses of anyone holding them to see through the Court's illusions and helping Nico to break two gods out of the chains of Prometheus.
- Carthaginian Serpent – Carthaginian Serpent was a 120-foot-tall serpent. In The Dark Prophecy, Apollo, Meg, and Leo face this monster while making their way to Commodus' lair. Apollo tricked it into crashing into a nearby condemned condominium.
- Centicore – Centicore are deadly antelope-like creatures who guard the Cave of Trophonius. Due to their endangered status, Apollo goes to great lengths not to kill them as he soaks himself in the waters of Lethe and Mnemosyne.
- Cerberus – Cerberus is a three-headed dog who guards the entrance to the Underworld. In The Lightning Thief, he befriends Annabeth. He also appears in The Last Olympian when he is playing with Mrs. O'Leary. Cerberus is the son of Echidna and Typhon. In the TV series, Cerberus resembles a three-headed rottweiler.
- Charybdis – Charybdis is one of the two monsters (the other being Scylla) who live on either side of a narrow channel of water, which is the entrance to the Sea of Monsters. She takes the form of a giant mouth that swallows and releases water, creating whirlpools. She is described by Percy as an "orthodontist's nightmare".
- Chimera – Chimera was a three-headed beast who is part lion and part goat, and has a snake-headed tail. It is first seen in the form of a chihuahua. It confronted Percy atop the St. Louis Arch alongside its mother Echidna. Overwhelmed by the creature and poisoned by its snake head, Percy was forced to jump into the water below to escape it. It disappeared after Percy dove into the water. In The Sun and the Star, it is revealed that the Chimera had aided Echidna in throwing Nico into Tartarus. In the TV series, the Chimera is depicted with a different dog form and having the head and front paws of a lioness, the horns and hindquarters of a goat, the hood of a cobra, and a snake tail with poisonous barbs.
- Clazmonian Sow – Clazmonian Sow is a flying pig who appeared directly after Hyperion was defeated. Percy defeats it with the help of Blackjack, a statue of Hermes, and the New York Public Library's two stone lion statues (that were really automatons).
- Colchis Bull – Fire-breathing bronze bulls created by Hephaestus with silver horns and ruby eyes. In The Sea of Monsters, some of these bulls attack Camp Half-Blood and are defeated by Tyson. They were later used to make the tracks for the Chariot Race. In The Sea of Monsters film, only one Colchis Bull attacked Camp Half-Blood and was slain by Percy.
- Dragons – Large reptilian creatures that sometimes have wings. They commonly guard things and are younger than Drakons.
  - Draco Aionius – Some of these monsters attacked Camp Half-Blood while Percy was on his adventures in The Sea of Monsters.
  - Ladon – A giant dragon who is one of the offspring of Echidna. It defends the Hesperides' apple tree. Ladon poisons Zoë in The Titan's Curse.
  - Peleus – A dragon who guards the Golden Fleece, which hangs on the tree that Thalia was previously within. He may be named after Peleus.
  - Python – A giant Earth Dragon who was an old enemy of Apollo. In The Blood of Olympus, Python was revived by Gaea during the Second Gigantomachy and it was mentioned that Python reclaiming Delphi was one of Apollo's many failures. In The Hidden Oracle, Apollo and Meg are in the Labyrinth when they overhear Python talking to Nero about the plans to control all the Oracles. In The Tower of Nero, Apollo manages to destroy Python forever by dropping him into Chaos. The death of Python restores the powers of the Oracles and he is stated to have become so powerful that he could even influence the threads of the Fates themselves. After Python's destruction upon falling into Chaos, Apollo regains his place as a god.
  - Sun Dragons – A type of Dragon who are associated with Helios.
    - Phil and Don – Sun dragons who Helios gave his granddaughter Medea to pull her golden chariot. In The Lost Hero, Medea keeps Phil and Don in large sundial compartments at her department store. She releases them to attack Jason, Piper, and Leo. Phil and Don were defeated by Festus. In The Burning Maze, Phil and Don pull Medea's golden chariot when she challenges Meg to a charmspeak battle. Both of them are beheaded by Meg.
- Drakons – Giant serpent-like creatures who are several millennia older than dragons. They come in three different types: Aethiopian, Lydian, and Maeonian. In Leo Valdez and the Quest for Buford, an unidentified Drakon appeared in the Camp Half-Blood Forest until it was ripped apart by the Maenads. In The Sun and the Star, two attack Nico and Will in the Underworld, but Nico kills one with Hiss-Majesty's help, scaring off the other one. In The Court of the Dead, a baby drakon is amongst the mythics taken prisoner by Pirithous, Tantalus and Mary Tudor. It later sides with the demigods and the good mythics and is described as fighting against Pirithous' largest Cyclops henchman at one point.
  - Aethiopian Drakon – A Drakon with terrifying green eyes who originated from Africa. One was being raised by Luke in The Sea of Monsters. When one of the Bear Twins seemed reluctant to do his bidding, Luke threatened to feed him to the Drakon. In The Battle of the Labyrinth, an Aethiopian Drakon was seen in the cargo bay of the Princess Andromeda.
  - Lydian Drakon – The oldest and fiercest of the Drakons who once attacked the village of Lydia. It is a 200-foot long Drakon with a paralyzing stare in sheer terror and armor-corroding acidic venom. In The Last Olympian, Kronos unleashed it upon Manhattan where it killed many half-bloods before being killed by Clarisse.
  - Maeonian Drakon – A green and yellow Drakon who once attacked Maenoia, Turkey. In The House of Hades, the Maeonian Drakon resides in the swamps of Tartarus. It attacked Percy, Annabeth, and Bob the Titan and was killed by Damasen. Damasen's curse was to slay the Maeonian Drakon every day. After being convinced to change his fate by Annabeth, Damasen manages to tame the Maeonian Drakon and rides it into battle against the embodiment of Tartarus himself.
- Eidolons – A race of spirits who can possess demigods. In The Mark of Athena, the Eidolons work for Gaea and one possesses Leo, causing a civil war between the Greek and Roman demigods. Later, two more possess Percy and Jason and force them to fight to the death before they are subdued by Piper who exorcises all three. The eidolons later return in new hosts in Rome, but are destroyed for good by Leo.
- Elephant – The elephants are large herbivores native to Africa and southern Asia. Any elephant that is bred for war is called a war elephant.
  - Hannibal – A war elephant who is owned by Camp Jupiter and often cared for by Bobby.
  - Livia – A war elephant owned by Commodus. In The Dark Prophecy, Livia was present at the rehearsal of Commodus' naming ceremony until she was rescued by Apollo and Thalia. In The Tyrant's Tomb, Apollo makes a claim that she and Hannibal would get along.
- Erymanthian Boar – A giant boar and servant of Pan who appears in The Titan's Curse. Percy, Thalia, Zoë, Grover, and Bianca first encounter it in Cloudcroft, New Mexico where Grover realizes its potential as a form of rapid transportation.
- Fire-Breathing Horse – A race of horses bred at the Triple G Ranch for war purposes. Some are shown to pull Ares' war chariot. In The Dark Prophecy, some Fire-Breathing Horses are owned by Commodus.
- Flesh-Eating Horse – A group of female horses bred at the Triple G Ranch. Some of them tried to eat Percy while he was cleaning the stables, but his use of hydrokinesis which washed them all clean scared them into behaving.
- Flesh-Eating Sheep – Carnivorous sheep owned by Polyphemus. They help to guard the Golden Fleece. Described as being a big as a hippopotamus and attacking like piranhas.
- Gale – An immortal polecat who was once a powerful and benevolent witch in ancient Greece before being transformed by Hecate. In The House of Hades, Gale appears as one of the goddess of magic's animal companions. In Wrath of the Triple Goddess, Percy, Annabeth, and Grover house and pet-sit for Hecate, leading to Hecuba and Gale getting out. Gale is captured and enslaved by four naiad sisters who utilize her alchemy talent to create a new range of potions. After being rescued, Gale helps Percy to create a cure for the creature transformation that he, Annabeth and Grover had been forced to undergo. Having learned of Gale's past and talent for alchemy, Percy convinces Hecate to let Gale resume her magical work with assistants who have opposable thumbs. Percy also plans on doing a project on her in his history class as a forgotten part of Greek history. In The Court of the Dead, Gale and Hecuba both briefly appear alongside Hecate before she sends them home.
- Giant Badger – A giant badger. In The Last Olympian, it was mentioned that Coach Hedge tried to fend off the Giant Badgers and tried to summon Pan to help him to do that.
- Giant Crab – A giant crab who may be Cancer. In The Last Olympian, Percy fought it in the Princess Andromeda during his mission with Charles Beckendorf. He defeated it by stabbing the soft tissue on its belly. In The Court of the Dead, the giant crab is mentioned amongst the mythics imprisoned in Golden Gate Park. Its presence confuses Nico, who does not understand why a giant crab is there.
- Giant Eagle – A giant-size eagle who appears throughout The Heroes of Olympus. The Giant Eagles are mainly used by the Romans for transporting and protecting Roman demigods.
- Giant Raven – A giant-sized raven. Caligula and Nero use a flock of them in The Tyrant's Tomb to protect Harpocrates due to the ravens hatred for Apollo. Apollo manages to scare them away at first by singing Dean Martin's "Volare", adopting a similar tactic used by Percy to disorient the Stymphalian Birds in The Sea of Monsters. When the ravens return, they are killed by Apollo, Reyna and Meg.
- Giant Scorpion – A giant-sized scorpion. Daedalus (under the alias of Quintus) ordered several Giant Scorpions from the Triple G Ranch and kept them in their boxes in the Sword Fighting Arena. He eventually let them out in the camp's forest for a game. In The Blood of Olympus, Orion mentions that his first death was at the hands of a giant scorpion that Gaea summoned to sting him to death after Orion was cursed by Apollo and went insane.
- Giant Sea Turtle – A large sea turtle who accompanied Sciron into attacking the Argo II in The House of Hades.
- Giant Snake – A large snake. It attacked Tyson and Grover when they were in the Labyrinth in The Battle of the Labyrinth.
- Giant Squid – A giant squid who may be the Kraken. It was among the sea monsters in Oceanus' army.
- Gryphon – A creature who is part eagle, part lion. They are known to collect golds for their nests and even lay golden eggs. The Gryphons appear in The Son of Neptune, where they are seen in Alcyoneus' camp. They are not to be confused with the griffins of The Kane Chronicles.
  - Abelard – A pet Gryphon to Britomartis who appeared in The Dark Prophecy.
  - Heloise – A pet Gryphon to Britomartis who appeared in The Dark Prophecy. She lays an egg while in Commodus' captivity and is later killed during the battle at Waystation.
  - Orcus – A small and friendly Gryphon who appears in The Court of the Dead amongst the mythics visiting Camp Jupiter looking to change for the better. Having not been on Earth in centuries, Orcus is unfamiliar with the modern world which gives him anxiety, causing a panic attack in the middle of the Caldecott Tunnel. This helps endear him to the Roman demigods who witness Orcus' struggles. Orcus later decides to leave to explore the world rather than remaining in the Roman camp.
- Hellhound – The hellhounds are a main part of Luke's army and monsters in general. They are described as very large black dogs with fiery glowing eyes. They were also mentioned to reside in the Fields of Punishment. Daedalus owns a hound named Mrs. O'Leary, who, unlike her relatives, is loving and loyal. In The Last Olympian, a group of hellhounds are seen in Kronos' army.
  - Mrs. O'Leary – A friendly hellhound who belonged to Daedalus under his alias of Quintus. She befriends Percy during The Battle of the Labyrinth and Daedalus gives Percy a whistle to summon her in a time of need, saving Percy and his friends lives at one point. When Daedalus decides to have Nico release his soul, he gives Percy ownership of Mrs. O'Leary. She subsequently appears several times as Percy's pet, searching for him and killing a gorgon in The Son of Neptune and fighting the Colossus of Nero alongside him in The Hidden Oracle. In Wrath of the Triple Goddess, it is mentioned that she travels the world as an independent hellhound, spending most of her time at Camp Jupiter, but Percy is able to summon her using a magical whistle crafted for him by Leo.
  - Hecuba – The former queen of Troy who was transformed into a hellhound by Hecate at the end of the Trojan War. She appears as one of Hecate's animal companions in The House of Hades. In Wrath of the Triple Goddess, Percy, Annabeth and Grover house and pet-sit for Hecate which leads to Hecuba getting out and wreaking havoc in Astoria before Percy convinces her to stand down. In The Court of the Dead, Gale and Hecuba both briefly appear alongside Hecate before she sends them home.
  - Nope – A hellhound puppy found by Percy and Mrs. O'Leary in Wrath of the Triple Goddess while they were searching for Hecuba. Nope is named for the fact that his barks sound like the word "nope". He is eventually adopted by Hecate.
- Hippalectryon – An endangered animal who is part chicken, part horse. In The Battle of the Labyrinth, they are seen at the Triple G Ranch.
- Hippocampus – Creatures that are horses from the waist up with a fish tail from the waist down. They are also called "fish ponies" by Tyson.
  - Rainbow – A Hippocampus who befriends Tyson, who named it, in The Sea of Monsters after being summoned by Percy for transport to the Princess Andromeda. He is stated to be bigger than most of his species and as such, has no trouble carrying a Cyclops on his back. Rainbow later rescues Tyson after the sinking of the CSS Birmingham and helps to carry Percy and his friends safely out of the Sea of Monsters after they get the Golden Fleece. When Tyson departs for Poseidon's palace, Rainbow gives him a ride. He is mentioned often following this by Tyson who maintains a friendship with Rainbow. In The Last Olympian, after Blackjack is stolen by Rachel, Percy summons Rainbow for a ride to Camp Half-Blood. In The Blood of Olympus, Rainbow gives Tyson and Ella a ride across Long Island Sound to rescue Reyna, Nico and Coach Hedge from Roman demigods. He then carries Tyson, Ella and Coach Hedge back to camp. When Tyson explains to Reyna that he had reached the ship on Rainbow, Reyna is confused at first thinking that he is talking about an actual rainbow before Nico clarifies the matter. In The Tyrant's Tomb, Tyson has Ella give him a tattoo of Rainbow. Rainbow also appears in The Sea of Monsters film.
- Incitatus – A talking white horse who wears golden horseshoes and is owned by Caligula. In The Burning Maze, Incitatus brings Apollo and Meg to Caligula. He later assists Caligula in fighting Jason and Tempest which ends in Jason's death. During the fight at the old Los Angeles Zoo, Incitatus and the Pandai with him are killed by the Meliai.
- Hydra – A serpentine monster with nine heads. Every time a head is chopped off, two new heads grow back. This monster appears in The Sea of Monsters where its life force is linked to the Monster Doughnut Shop. It was destroyed by the cannons of the CSS Birmingham, with several of its heads being kept as spoils of war in the Camp Half-Blood attic. In The Mark of Athena, Percy fights a Hydra when he, Jason, and Piper are on a mission to rescue Nico from Ephialtes and Otis. In The Lightning Thief film, the creature takes the form of five janitors (played by Tom Pickett, Keith Dallas, V.J. Delos-Reyes, Spencer Atkinson, and Tim Aas) in the Parthenon replica in Tennessee. The Hydra is ultimately defeated after being petrified with Medusa's head.
- Karpoi – Grain spirits who are the size of toddlers. While many of them are malevolent thanks to their service to Gaea, children of Demeter are apparently also capable of summoning karpoi.
  - Peaches – A friendly Karpoi resembling a pudgy human toddler with green eyes and green hair. He is controlled by Meg.
  - Quinoa – A friendly Karpoi appearing in The Court of the Dead amongst the mythics seeking refuge at Camp Jupiter. Quinoa quickly endears himself to the population of New Rome and finds a job as a kindergarten teacher.
- Keres – Spirits of famine and disease who feed on violent deaths. They reside in the Underworld and support the Titans but do not assist them in The Last Olympian. In "Percy Jackson and the Sword of Hades", several of them attacked Percy, Thalia, and Nico. One of them poisoned Percy, yet Bob the Titan managed to heal him.
- Katobleps – A race of cow-like monsters who appear in The House of Hades. A number of them are killed by Frank in Venice, with the last one being transformed into a serpent by Mars on Frank's request. In The Court of the Dead, a herd of katobleps are amongst the mythics trapped in Golden Gate Park.
- Ketos – Chiron mentions Ketos, a giant sea monster, in The Titan's Curse.
- Khromandae – A race of monsters with shaggy blonde fur, gray eyes, sharp teeth, and speak in high-pitched shrieks. Dionysus once used them in his drunken invasion of India. In The Tyrant's Tomb, the Khromandae participate in the Battle of San Francisco Bay, but are taken out by Apollo and Meg.
- Lemures – A race of angry ghosts who are seen on multiple times in The House of Hades.
- Leucrotae – Creatures who had the body of a red-furred lion and the hooves and tail of a horse and cannot be harmed by metal weapons. In The Diary of Luke Castellan, Luke and Thalia were trapped in Halcyon Green's mansion and encountered by two Leucrotae who speak with a man's voice. The two of them discovered that the Leucrotae are linked to Halcyon's thoughts. When Thalia uses Greek fire on the Leucrotae, Halcyon sacrifices his life by luring the Leucrotae away so that Luke and Thalia can escape.
- Leviathan – These are mentioned by Poseidon in The Last Olympian as giant sea creatures that are neutral in the war between Poseidon and Oceanus.
- Lupa – The wolf who raised Romulus and Remus. She guides the children of Roman gods to Camp Jupiter after they are left for her at the Wolf House where she trains them to become Roman soldiers upon finding the worthy ones. She is the Roman counterpart of Chiron who does a similar job for the Greek demigods, only she is more militaristic.
- Makhai – The spirits of battle and combat. In The Blood of Olympus, Asclepius used the Makhai and the Pylosian Mint to formulate the Physician's Cure.
- Mania – Ghosts who personify insanity, madness and crazed frenzy. In The Blood of Olympus, Beryl Grace and Julian Ramírez-Arellano are among the Mania. In The Sun and the Star, the ghost of the half-centaur Amphithemis is one while trapped in Tartarus.
- Manticore – A monster with the face of a man, the body of a lion, and the tail of a scorpion. In this franchise, the Manticores can assume human forms. More Manticores appear in The Sun and the Star as part of Nyx's monster army. In The Sea of Monsters film, a Manticore (portrayed and also motion-captured by Daniel Cudmore in deleted scenes) appeared as a top henchman of Luke. It is killed by Grover and Clarisse.
  - Dr. Thorn – A Manticore in human form who appeared in The Titan's Curse. Dr. Thorn is the vice-principal of Westover Hall, the school that Bianca and Nico attended. He is angry that in the ancient days, the Gods forced him to live out in Persia where he never had any decent challenges as he would in Ancient Greece. Thorn hunts Nico and Bianca and acts as one of the primary henchmen of Luke and the Titan Atlas hunting for the Ophiotaurus. Percy manages to contact Dionysus at Camp Half-Blood and the god kills Thorn by covering him in vines and turning him to dust. In The Sun and the Star, a reformed Thorn and his fellow Manticores appears amongst Nyx's monster army in Tartarus, where he tries to exact revenge upon Nico against Nyx's orders. Fed up with him, Nyx sucks Thorn into darkness. In the TV series, he will be portrayed by David Costabile. In this show, his Manticore form is depicted as having the face of a man, the body of a humanoid lion from the waist up, and the body of a scorpion from the waist down.
- Myrmekes – Giant ant-like creatures who like shiny things like gold. In "Percy Jackson and the Bronze Dragon", some Myrmekes trapped Charles Beckendorf in their nest. In The Hidden Oracle, Apollo and Meg come across a trio of Myrmekes who kidnap Meg, forcing Apollo to infiltrate their nest and rescue her. Later, Apollo successfully persuades the mother ant "Mama" to help him and other demigods return to Camp Half-Blood.
- Nemean Lion – A lion who is one of the children of Echidna and Typhon. It has a hard skin in which no weapon can penetrate and was previously killed by Heracles. Luke and Atlas sent the Nemean Lion to the National Air and Space Museum to stop the group of questing Hunters and Demigods. It battled with Percy, but was hard to defeat because of its bulletproof and sword-proof pelt. Percy eventually defeated it by throwing astronaut food into its mouth thus exposing its one unprotected surface, its mouth, to the Hunters' arrows. Zoë allows Percy to claim the lion's pelt as a spoil of war and it turns into a bulletproof coat that protects Percy until he sacrifices it to Poseidon.
- Nosoi – The spirits of illness, plague, and disease who were originally locked up in Pandora's Box. In The Hidden Oracle, several Nosoi attack Apollo and Meg, but are defeated by them and the Karpoi Peaches.
- Ophiotaurus – A half-cow/half-snake monster. It was nicknamed Bessie by Percy who initially assumed it was female, although Grover later informed him that it was male. Percy saved it from a trawler's net after being fetched by the Hippocampi. Bessie was supposedly the creature that Artemis was hunting because it could destroy Olympus. He appears in The Titan's Curse and The Last Olympian.
- Orthrus – A two-headed dog owned by Geryon and brother to Cerberus.
- Pegasi – A species of winged horses. They are named for the original mount of Bellerophon, who was born from the blood of Medusa.
  - Pegasus – The original Pegasus who is the immortal father of the species. He is stated to have not been seen in person for centuries, but Pegasus comes to Reyna, Nico, and Coach Hedge's aid in The Blood of Olympus, leading eight other Pegasus to help transport the Athena Parthenos. He eventually departs when the group arrives at Long Island Sound, but reveals that he came to honor Reyna's close relationship with Scipio for which Pegasus declares her Horse Friend, a high honor.
  - Blackjack – A black Pegasus and Percy's loyal friend. He is first introduced in The Sea of Monsters on the Princess Andromeda where Percy indirectly rescued him from Kronos' minions although Percy mistakes Blackjack for a female at the time. Subsequently, he acts as Percy's main method of transport, constantly referring to Percy as "Boss", much to Percy's annoyance. In The Last Olympian, he allows Charles Beckendorf to ride him with Percy's permission and is later hijacked by Rachel to get to Camp Half-Blood quickly, much to Percy's annoyance. In The Blood of Olympus, Blackjack is one of eight Pegasus enlisted by the original Pegasus himself to help carry the Athena Parthenos. Blackjack acts as Nico's steed despite his previous distaste for the son of Hades and comforts Reyna. Blackjack is severely wounded by Orion, but Reyna is able to save his life and he is stated to be recovering nicely after the final battle with Gaea's forces.
  - Guido – A gray and white Pegasus who is friends with Blackjack. In The Last Olympian, Guido and Porkpie aided Percy and Blackjack in the Battle of Manhattan. In The Blood of Olympus, Guido is one of eight Pegasus enlisted by the original Pegasus himself to help transport the Athena Parthenos. After Pegasus' departure and Blackjack being severely wounded, he allows Reyna to ride him the rest of the way to Camp Half-Blood where she rides Guido throughout the battle with Gaea's forces. After the battle, Guido decides to adopt Reyna as his human and return to Camp Jupiter with her. However, Guido does not appear nor is he mentioned in The Tyrant's Tomb or The Tower of Nero which both also feature Reyna.
  - Porkpie – A gray and white Pegasus who is friends with Blackjack. In The Last Olympian, Guido and Porkpie aided Percy and Blackjack in the Battle of Manhattan.
  - Scipio – Reyna's Pegasus who appears in The Son of Neptune. His nickname was "Skippy" because he was the color of peanut butter, the same color as chestnuts. He died at the end of The House of Hades when Reyna is forced to euthanize him following Scipio's severe injuries from a griffin attack. In The Blood of Olympus, the original Pegasus honors Reyna and Scipio's great friendship by coming to her aid personally, the first time that Pegasus has been seen in centuries. As a result of how much Reyna had cared for Scipio, Pegasus declares her Horse Friend, a high honor.
- Pit Scorpion – A deadly type of scorpion who appears in The Lightning Thief. When Luke brings Percy into the woods and reveals his allegiance to Kronos, he summoned a Pit Scorpion to attack Percy. He tells Percy he should not go for his sword as the pit scorpion can kill in sixty seconds and can jump up to fifteen feet. When Luke disappears, Percy manages to kill it even though it managed to sting him. Wood nymphs help Percy recover from its poison. In The Sun and the Star, a number of Pit Scorpions appear part of Nyx's army in Tartarus and fight Bob the Titan.
- Scylla – One of the two monsters (the other being Charybdis) who live on either side of a narrow channel of water in the Sea of Monsters. Should a ship sail too close to her, she uses her six heads to pluck off crew members on deck and devour them. According to Clarisse, Scylla would just pick up and crush the whole boat if the crew hid below deck. In The Sea of Monsters film, Scylla was mentioned by Clarisse to have eaten Ichneutae.
- Sea Serpent – A large serpent who lives in the sea. Deimos is seen riding one in "Percy Jackson and the Stolen Chariot". In The Last Olympian, a sea serpent was seen among the sea monsters in Oceanus' army.
  - Carthaginian Serpent – A giant serpent with a deadly venom who guards the entrance of Commodus' lair in Indianapolis.
- Sirens – Dangerous bird women whose sweet songs lead many sailors to their deaths on the jagged rocks. In The Sea of Monsters, they almost killed Annabeth.
- Skeleton – Skeletons are the undead troops that make up Hades' undead army. In The Lightning Thief, Hades has skeletons in army uniforms guarding his palace. In The Battle of the Labyrinth, Nico manages to employ them as part of a ritual that will enable him to call the spirit of his sister to speak with her. In The Last Olympian, Nico and Hades manage to bring a troop of skeletons to help fight the Titans. They are later seen constructing a cabin at Camp Half-Blood which is dedicated to Hades. In The House of Hades, they are on the demigods side and help them in Hades' temple in Epirus. In The Court of the Dead, a number of skeleton guards serve Pirithous, Tantalus, and Mary Tudor.
- Skolopendra – A sea monster who is 200 feet long. It looks like a cross between a giant shrimp and a cockroach with a pink chitinous shell, a flat crayfish tail and millipede-type legs. Its face is pink like an enormous catfish with two glassy eyes and a gaping toothless maw. In The Mark of Athena, Ceto sent Skolopendra after the demigods after their escape from Phorcys' aquarium. It attacked the Argo II when Leo forgot to turn the monster-detection system on. Skolopendra withdraws into the ocean when Leo and Hazel throw test tubes filled with Greek fire into its mouth.
- Small Bob – A saber-toothed skeleton cat who was accidentally created by Atlas' minions in The Titan's Curse while attempting to create Spartus. Atlas has the cats destroyed and they are sent to Tartarus where Percy, Annabeth, and Bob the Titan encounter the one that Bob names Small Bob in The House of Hades. While generally taking on the form of a small calico cat, Small Bob can grow in size to a large saber-toothed cat if he wishes to. Bob takes Small Bob as his pet throughout their journey to the Doors of Death. Small Bob is presumed destroyed at the end of the book along with Bob and the friendly giant Damasen while holding off the embodiment of Tartarus so that the demigods can escape. In The Sun and the Star, taking place over a year later, while on a rescue mission for Bob, Will happens to run into Small Bob and instantly recognizes the cat from Percy and Annabeth's stories. Recognizing Nico and Will as friends, Small Bob guides them through Tartarus to his master and protects them from attacking monsters several times. He later accompanies the demigods and Bob back to the mortal world and leaves with Bob as the Titan heads west to figure out his future.
- Spartus – A troop of skeletons armed with weapons. They are usually summoned by planting dragon (Sybaris) teeth in the ground and watering them with blood. In The Titan's Curse, some Spartoi ambushed Percy, Thalia, Zoë, Grover, and Bianca in New Mexico. Due to her being a child of Hades, Bianca managed to destroy them. In The Son of Neptune, Frank (as a gift from his father) is given a spear with the tip of a dragon's tooth that when planted with raise one of the Spartoi, he uses this to defeat the basilisks outside of the R.O.F.L. headquarters, to kill some of the Laistrygonians surrounding his grandmother's house then using his final charge to protect the mortals on a train from attacking Griffins.
  - Gray – A Spartus that can be summoned by Frank. He lost this ability after his spear ran out of charges.
- Sphinx – A monster with the head of a woman and the body of a lion. Percy and his friends encountered the Sphinx while navigating the labyrinth. Rather than tell riddles, the Sphinx asked historical questions which Annabeth refused to answer as an insult to her intelligence. They are not to be confused with the Sphinx from The Kane Chronicles.
- Strix – Owl-like creatures who eat the flesh and blood of humans. They curse the mortals who kill them. Anyone scratched by the talons of the Strix will be paralyzed. In The Burning Maze, Apollo's Lester Papadopoulos form was chased by a flock of Strix. After one Strix gets through the tomato bomb and scratches Lester on the cheek, Grover was able to reason with it as the Strix states that it was sent by Emperor Caligula to kill them. Under the advice of the Arrow of Dardona, Meg, and Grover grew strawberries to distract the flock of Strix so that they can get away. Other Strix appeared on the Julia Drusilla Yachts where Caligula uses them as surveillance. Caligula replaced the Germani with Strix and Pandai because the Germani are responsible for his mortal death.
- Stymphalian Birds – A flock of Stymphalian birds attack Camp Half-Blood in The Sea of Monsters while the camp's defenses are weakened. Percy and Annabeth use Chiron's boombox and Dean Martin's "Volare" to scare them so that Apollo's cabin can shoot them down. A flock of Stymphalian Birds attack the Argo II in The House of Hades but are quickly dealt with by Festus. In The Blood of Olympus, Frank and Hazel are mentioned to have fought a flock of them on Pylos, but they are quickly dealt with by Piper shooting vegetables at them with her cornucopia. In The Tyrant's Tomb, Apollo recalls the story of Percy using music against the Stymphalian birds and uses the same tactic to scare away a flock of giant ravens. In The Demigod Files, Phobos summons them to fight Clarisse after he steals Ares' war chariot. In The Sun and the Star, Will accidentally releases a flock of them from a regeneration pod in Tartarus. Will manages to stun them briefly using his ultrasonic whistle and the ones that are not killed by Small Bob are eventually forced to flee.
- Taurus Sylvestre – Also known as Forest Bulls. They are a race of cattle with red fur and blue eyes. The Taurus Sylvestre are the known enemies of the Troglodytes. If they fall into a pit, they will die from their anger leaving their hides behind. In The Tower of Nero, three Taurus Sylvestre were in the rail cars on the Dare family's property. They escaped and were chased into a construction site by Apollo, Meg, Nico, and Will. The three Taurus Sylvestre fall into a pit and die from their anger as the four look at them. Some of them later end up in the troglodyte caves. In The Sun and the Star, Nico has relocated the Troglodytes to the Underworld due to the Taurus Sylvestre destroying their original home.
- Telekhine – Dog-faced sea demons that reforged Kronos' blade in The Battle of the Labyrinth. In The Mark of Athena, some Telekhines are seen in a water tank at the Georgia Aquarium.
- Trojan Sea Monster – A sea monster that rampaged the coasts of Troy until it was slain by Heracles. It is also known as the Keto Trois. In The Lost Hero, Jason claims to have slain this monster while fighting Porphyrion of the Gigantes.
- Typhon – A very powerful monster born from Gaea and Tartarus. He sired many monsters by Echidna. He lives and sleeps inside Mount St. Helens. In The Battle of the Labyrinth, Percy causes Mount St. Helens to erupt while trying to escape Telekhines and he inadvertently awakens Typhon in the process. In The Last Olympian, Typhon awakes and moves across America destroying everything in his path. As he is concealed in mist, Typhon's appearance is not described and appears as a freak storm. The gods of Olympus try to stop him, but he is too powerful. In the end, Poseidon and his army help to defeat him and Poseidon opened up a tunnel that sends Typhon directly into Tartarus. Once Typhon was defeated, a wave of anemoi thuellai were born.
- Unicorn – A horse with one horn. A herd of unicorns are used as steeds for the campers of Camp Jupiter. A red-tinted Lares with the head of a wolf guards them.
  - Buster – A unicorn who lives in Camp Jupiter. In The Tyrant's Tomb, Meg and Pranjai use his horn shavings to tend to the scratch on Apollo's stomach. He later joins the other unicorns in fighting the invading zombies during the second wave of Caligula's Assault on Camp Jupiter.
  - Horatio – A unicorn who lives in Camp Jupiter. In The Tyrant's Tomb, Horatio is among the unicorns who fight Tarquin's army during the Battle of San Francisco Bay.
  - Muffin – A unicorn who lives in Camp Jupiter. In The Tyrant's Tomb, Muffin is among the unicorns who fight Tarquin's army during the Battle of San Francisco Bay.
  - Shirley – A unicorn who lives in Camp Jupiter. In The Tyrant's Tomb, Shirley is among the unicorns who fight Tarquin's army during the Battle of San Francisco Bay.
  - Whagadoodle – A unicorn who lives in Camp Jupiter. In The Tyrant's Tomb, Whagadoodle is among the unicorns who fight Tarquin's army during the Battle of San Francisco Bay.
- Venti – Storm spirits who were born when Poseidon opened a tunnel that sent Typhon into Tartarus. Depending on how chaotic they are, Venti can appear as either smoky men with angel-like wings or smoky horses. In The Lost Hero, Aeolus sent the Venti to prevent Jason, Piper, Leo, and the Hunters of Artemis from rescuing Hera. Their Greek counterparts are anemoi thuellai. In The Blood of Olympus, they attack the Argo II. Later, a team of ventus belonging to Notus is harnessed by Jason to tow the damaged ship to Malta.
  - Dylan – A ventus who was among the venti that attacked Jason, Piper, and Leo in The Lost Hero. In The Blood of Olympus, Jason captures the biggest and meanest venti during the attack on the Argo II, unaware that it is his old enemy Dylan. Dylan is forced to provide Jason air to breathe underwater, but unexpectedly aids Jason of his own free will in the battle against Polybotes, saving Jason's life. Through Kymopoleia, Dylan begs Jason to release him and promises never to attack Jason again. Jason is disgusted to realize that he has been "breathing Dylan", but Dylan earns his gratitude for Dylan's help against the Giant. Upon returning to the surface, Jason complies with Dylan's request and releases him.
  - Tempest – A ventus in smoky horse form who appears in The Lost Hero. Jason tames Tempest so that it can help him fight Porphyrion. After Jason dies in The Burning Maze, Tempest returns his body to his friends and then vanishes.

== The Kane Chronicles ==
=== Main characters ===
==== Carter Kane ====
Carter Kane is one of two protagonists and narrators of The Kane Chronicles and is a descendant of Narmer and Ramses the Great. He is the son of Julius and Ruby Kane. After the death of his mother when he was eight, he spent six years travelling the world with his Egyptologist father. His sister Sadie lives with their maternal grandparents and Carter and his father visit Sadie twice a year, on the winter and summer solstices.

After his father is captured by the god Set during The Red Pyramid, Carter spends most of his time with his sister Sadie and uncle Amos Kane. He becomes the host of Horus in the first novel, and often collaborates with and receives advice from the god. He also develops a romantic relationship with the shabti of magician Zia Rashid, and subsequently spends much of his time trying to find the real Zia and demonstrate his feelings toward her.

Carter has dark skin and hair. His specialty is combat magic; his preferred weapon a khopesh, but he loses it in The Throne of Fire. He is often given leadership responsibilities and struggles to accept his role, until he willingly becomes pharaoh of the House of Life during The Serpent's Shadow. In The Son of Sobek and The Crown of Ptolemy, Carter teams up with Percy and Annabeth to combat Setne, briefly using Greek magic and Annabeth's invisibility cap.

==== Sadie Kane ====
Sadie Kane is one of two protagonists and narrators of The Kane Chronicles and is the younger sister of Carter. She is left in the care of her non-magical grandparents in London after the death of their mother Ruby Kane. Sadie has to abruptly leave her life in London when she goes to revive the twenty-first Nome and fight Set after the god captures her father, Julius Kane. Sadie becomes the host of Isis in The Red Pyramid and continues to study the goddess' path throughout the series. She also becomes romantically involved with one of the Brooklyn House initiates Walt Stone and also with the god Anubis, though her relationship with either is not formalized until after Walt becomes the "eye" of Anubis in The Serpent's Shadow, due to this she is the only current polyamorous character in Rick Riordan's works.

She has caramel-colored hair, fair skin, and blue eyes, some traits inherited from her mother Ruby. Her magical specialty is with spells, potions, and hieroglyphics.

==== Walt Stone ====
Walt Stone is one of the twenty-first Nome's initiates, who arrives at Brooklyn House sometime between the first and second novel. He has dark skin and is from Seattle, where he lived with his mother. Walt is a sau, or charmmaker. In The Throne of Fire, it is revealed that Walt has inherited a deadly curse from his ancestor Akhenaten, which will kill him before reaches adulthood, as it did to his father and their famous ancestor King Tut. The curse progresses more quickly when he uses magic, which is why he specializes in charms and also why he begins to call on the god Anubis for guidance. In The Serpent's Shadow, Walt finally succumbs to the curse, but as he dies he allows himself to become the host of Anubis, whose spirit can essentially keep him alive. Both Anubis and Walt Stone have romantic feelings for Sadie, which makes it easier for Walt to host Anubis. In The Staff of Serapis, Sadie tells Annabeth that it is confusing dating both of them while they are merged, although she has accepted it.

==== Zia Rashid ====
Zia Rashid is a magician from the first Nome who was born and raised in Egypt. She is found and raised by Iskandar, the Chief Lector, after the destruction of her hometown by Apophis. When Julius Kane released five gods through the Rosetta Stone, she became the unexpected host of Nephthys, and was subsequently placed by Iskandar in an underwater prison so the House of Life could not eliminate her. A shabti of her was created to take her place; it is destroyed during the fight with Set in The Red Pyramid. Carter falls in love with this shabti and seeks out the real Zia to free her and release Nephthys' spirit. Zia, who specializes in fire magic, later becomes the host of Ra and the two manage to destroy Apophis in The Serpent's Shadow. Her initial indifference to Carter slowly evolves into romance, and the two begin dating at the end of the series when Ra ascends back to the heavens.

==== Amos Kane ====
Amos Kane is Julius Kane's younger brother, Carter and Sadie's uncle, and the leader of the twenty-first Nome (New York). He takes in Carter and Sadie after Julius hosts Osiris and is trapped by the god Set. During the first novel, Amos is possessed by Set and forced to lure his niece and nephew to the god's pyramid in Phoenix, Arizona. Once freed, Amos goes for healing at the first Nome, and does not return to Brooklyn House until the second novel. His experience hosting Set has changed him, however, and eventually leads to his decision to voluntarily host the god during the final battle with Apophis. Amos succeeds Michel Desjardins as leader of the House of Life after he sacrifices himself fighting Apophis. After the final battle, Carter becomes the Pharaoh, but leaves Amos in charge of running the day-to-day operations of the House of Life in Amos' capacity as Chief Lector.

==== Anubis ====
Anubis is the god of funerals and death with the appearance and personality of a teenager despite him being over 5,000 years old. Anubis is the son of Nephthys and Set, but felt closest to his uncle Osiris, who raised him in Duat. Unlike the other Egyptian gods, Anubis does not require a host to manifest on Earth and is instead able to appear in any place of death. In The Red Pyramid, Sadie sees him several times in dreams without understanding who he actually is and develops an immediate attraction to Anubis. To get the Feather of Truth, Carter and Sadie travel into the Underworld where Sadie meets Anubis in person for the first time and convinces him to give her the feather before Anubis teleports them to New Orleans. Later, Anubis appears to Sadie when she touches her father/Osiris' tomb and attempts to warn her against her actions. Days after the battle is over, Anubis visits Brooklyn House to transport Carter and Sadie to meet with their father and Osiris, calling his time with Sadie "stimulating", but annoying Sadie as Anubis tells her mother that Sadie has a sharp tongue.

In The Throne of Fire, Anubis appears in a graveyard in London while she is being chased by two hostile gods, although he is unable to help her directly as Anubis cannot manifest outside of the graveyard. Instead, Anubis directs Sadie to the second part of the Book of Ra and gives her a Netjeri blade and kisses Sadie as a birthday present. After Sadie and Carter are knocked unconscious, she encounters Anubis in a dream who is talking with Walt Stone and he gives her more advice about the Book of Ra. To Sadie's disappointment, Anubis is not present when she and Carter are gambling their souls with Khonsu. Anubis later states that he was busy with a "side project" that he will not elaborate on while Walt glances at a picture Sadie made of Anubis, suggesting that the god and the magician are plotting something together.

In The Serpent's Shadow, Anubis appears with Sadie's mother after she is knocked unconscious and offers her clues about the shadow box that she saved. During a dance that Sadie attends, Anubis appears to dance with her, stunning the popular girls who were harassing Sadie moments before, including Drew and making them extremely jealous. Anubis offers Sadie advice on her and Carter's plan to destroy Apophis despite the magic being so forbidden that he's not even allowed to talk about it. Anubis then reveals that ghosts are being absorbed by Apophis' shadow before his great-grandfather Shu appears to break the two up. Shu reveals that due to Anubis' growing romantic feelings for Sadie, he has been banned from seeing her with Anubis stating that such a relationship is forbidden unless the god is using a human host which has never been how Anubis works.

Walt eventually admits to Carter that Anubis thinks he only has until the next day's sunset to live and that the god has been helping him to make sense of his strange new power to turn things to dust. Anubis thinks he understands why Walt has that particular power and Anubis has a plan to extend his life, but it is not a cure and is risky, never been done before and might come with side effects that they will not like. When Walt is near death from his curse, Anubis appears to him and Sadie is annoyed to realize that the two have been plotting behind her back together. Near death, Walt agrees to what they've been planning together, both Anubis and Walt unable to bring themselves to leave Sadie. After Walt dies, Anubis vanishes and Walt is suddenly resurrected. Sadie finally realizes that Walt and Anubis' plan was for Walt to become Anubis' host and that Walt's strange death powers had come from him channeling Anubis' power for months. Overwhelmed, Sadie leaves through a portal that Anubis opens for her to help Carter while Walt and Anubis, still too weak to move, remain behind for the time being to recover.

Anubis and Walt fight in the final battle with Apophis and the rebel magicians, playing a crucial role in the defeat of the latter. Although Apophis' destruction means that the Egyptian gods must depart the Earth for the time being, Anubis using Walt as his permanent host means that he can stay and pursue a real life, something that Anubis has never gotten before. Sadie starts a romantic relationship with Walt and Anubis, finally able to be with both of the boys that she loves without having to choose between them.

In The Staff of Serapis, Sadie mentions to Annabeth that she is still dating both Walt and Anubis and that it is confusing, but she has accepted it. Annabeth is left confused by the comment about Sadie's "funeral god boyfriend", but she does not question it.

==== Iskandar ====
Iskandar is the Chief Lector of the House of Life. Born in the 1st century BCE, during the reign of Cleopatra VII, he witnessed the end of the Egyptian monarchy and the absorption of Egypt into the Roman Empire. He came to believe this was the fault of the gods and ended the House's policy of calling upon them; Ruby Kane's vision of Apophis rising changes his mind, but it is too late for him to make any real change. He saved Zia after her village's destruction and, sensing that she holds the power to host Ra, arranged for her confinement in an underwater prison under the watch of Nephthys while creating a shabti of her to protect Carter and Sadie, both of whom also hold the potential to become hosts of gods. Shortly after meeting them, he dies in his sleep, knowing that these three can make a change where he could not. He is succeeded by Michel Desjardins as the House's leader. Sadie briefly encounters his spirit in the Realm of the Dead while making her way through it.

==== Michel Desjardins ====
Michel Desjardins (Dey-shard-dahn) is an antagonist and leader of the House of Life after the death of Iskandar. Desjardins is the grandnephew of Jean-François Champollion and approximately 200 years old, considered "young" for a magician. As such, he has known only the House policy forbidding the Path of the Gods. He is therefore at first opposed to cooperation with the gods and disagrees with the Kanes when they claim it is necessary to stop Apophis. As a result of his antagonistic behavior, the Kanes wrongly suspect him of being the host of Set in The Red Pyramid. After Set's defeat, Desjardins is outraged that Carter and Sadie chose to make a deal with the god rather than banish, but chooses not to attack them in the end, realizing that enough fighting has been done for one day and that his men appear to be wavering after witnessing the Kanes give up the powers of Horus and Isis willingly. In The Throne of Fire, he works with Vladimir Menshikov in the latter's attempt to hunt Sadie and Carter, believing his lies about how the Kanes' efforts will empower Apophis. Throughout the book, Desjardins grows visibly weaker and older and Zia Rashid realizes that Menshikov has been poisoning him while Desjardins mistakenly believes that it is the weight of leadership getting to him. Desjardins eventually realizes the truth and comes to the Kanes rescue in the Duat where Menshikov has been possessed by the spirit of Apophis. Desjardins casts an execration spell upon Menshikov, killing him and banishing Apophis deeper into the Duat for a while. However, the effort costs Desjardins his life as Desjardins uses up all of his life force to cast the spell. Before dying, Desjardins makes peace with the Kanes and has them pass on his title of Chief Lector of the House of Life to Amos Kane. He is mentioned several times throughout The Serpent's Shadow, particularly in relation to how the Kanes plan to defeat Apophis is to perform their own execration upon the god. It is noted that Desjardins only faced a weaker manifestation of the snake and could not do more than banish him for a while the Kanes face Apophis himself at his full power.

==== Set ====
Set is the ancient Egyptian god of evil and an antagonist of The Red Pyramid and a supporting character in The Throne of Fire and The Serpent's Shadow. Although he initially appears to be the main antagonist of The Red Pyramid, Set is actually manipulated secretly by Apophis throughout the book. While Set is evil, he is stated many times to be more of a necessary evil, unlike Apophis. In ancient times, Set acted as the faithful lieutenant of Ra in the eternal war against Apophis and he was born on the third Demon Day, or December 29. He would eventually marry his sister Nephthys and have a son with her, Anubis, but Anubis was raised by Osiris and Isis instead. After Ra retreated into the heavens and Osiris became the new Pharaoh of the gods, Set refused to stand for it, imprisoned his brother in a magnificent sarcophagus and relentlessly chased Isis who was able to rescue Osiris. However, Set blew Osiris into fourteen different pieces and although Isis managed to reconstruct her husband, she was only ever able to resurrect him as the Lord of the Underworld. Set was eventually dethroned by Horus in revenge and in time, would be imprisoned along with the rest of the gods by the House of Life.

In The Red Pyramid, Julius Kane uses the Rosetta Stone to release Osiris and return him to his throne in the Underworld as a first step toward restoring the gods due to the increasing threat of Apophis. However, Julius inadvertently releases all five gods of the Demon Days, including Set who imprisons Julius and Osiris in a sarcophagus and begins draining them of their power. He also secretly possesses Amos Kane to get close to Julius' children Carter and Sadie, the hosts of Horus and Isis respectively, whom he sends various minions after, including two other gods. Goaded by his demon minion Face of Horror, Set decides to summon a storm that will destroy North America at sunrise on his birthday to increase his own power. Despite Set's machinations and having to avoid the House of Life, the Kanes manage to confront Set at his base, the Red Pyramid. As Carter fights Set, Sadie teleports the pyramid to Washington, DC through a portal, severing Set from the source of his power, the desert, and stopping the storm and his plot. Having gotten Set's secret name "Evil Day" from Nephthys, Sadie performs a spell to banish Set deep into the Duat, but sensing that something is wrong, looks into the rift that the spell opened and spots Apophis, the true orchestrator of the plot. Breaking the spell, Sadie uses the Feather of Truth to show Carter and Set Apophis in the sky and Carter kills Face of Horror who is revealed to be possessed by Apophis whose true plan was to use the Chaos energy generated by Set's storm to escape from his prison. Rather than continue their attempt to banish Set, the Kanes negotiate with him, recognizing Set as a necessary evil and an important part in the war with Apophis. In exchange for being released, Set swears on his secret name and Ra's throne to not return until he is summoned to help in the fight against Apophis. Once Set is released, he departs into the Duat.

In The Throne of Fire, Vladimir Menshikov summons Set into a malachite jar, trapping him and using his knowledge of Set's secret name to force the god to reveal the properties of Apophis' prison. Noticing the Kanes hiding nearby, he alerts Menshikov to their prison and, outmatched by the older magician, Sadie breaks the jar and frees Set who incapacitates Menshikov and allows the Kanes to escape as thanks. After Carter is poisoned by a deadly monster snake, Set helps Sadie get Carter to safety and in exchange for Sadie giving him back his secret name, he offers her the location of the last part of the Book of Ra which Bes confirms that Set would know as he was the one to hide it. After making Set agree to a continuing truce with her family, Sadie takes the deal. In addition, Set informs Sadie of where to find the missing Zia Rashid, which makes Sadie suspicious as Apophis did the exact same thing, although not as well as Set. To Sadie's surprise, Set keeps their deal and departs without trying to harm them. He is later present when Ra retakes his throne.

In The Serpent's Shadow, Amos is revealed to have been communicating with and channeling the power of Set, concerning Carter, Sadie and Zia who fear that Set may be controlling Amos again. Set appears to Carter on the Egyptian Queen and reassures Carter that he is not manipulating Amos, implying that Amos had in fact sent Set to talk to Carter. Set insists that he is simply a necessary evil, balancing out the other gods who are good and that he does not want Apophis to win, reminding Carter of his service as Ra's faithful lieutenant. During the final battle with Apophis and the rebel magicians, Amos acts as Set's host and although Amos is in control, he appears to struggle with some of Set's more violent tendencies. After Apophis is destroyed, Set is exiled along with the other gods. He attends Horus' coronation as Pharaoh of the gods, supporting him, but with a smile that suggests that Set has something evil planned. In addition, Amos begins wearing crimson clothing which Carter thinks is to play up his connection to Set. As a result, Carter doubts that Amos will have any more trouble enforcing his rule.

==== Apophis ====
Apophis is the serpent of Chaos who fought Ra in ancient times and the primary antagonist of The Kane Chronicles. When Ra eventually retired to the heavens, he sacrificed his third aspect Khepri to seal Apophis away in a prison deep within the Duat and sent his loyal cat goddess Bast to fight Apophis for eternity inside of the prison. Before the series begins, Ruby Kane, who has prophetic abilities, foresees Apophis' eventual escape and sacrifices herself to rescue Bast from their prison as a first step to restoring the gods and preventing Apophis' rise.

In The Red Pyramid, Apophis acts from behind the scenes after Julius Kane begins the process of releasing the other gods. By possessing Set's demon minion Face of Horror with a fragment of his soul from within his weakened prison, Apophis pushes Set to create a storm that will destroy all of North America which will create enough Chaos energy to allow Apophis to break free. Both the gods and the magicians remain unaware of Apophis' role in the events, believing that Set is only acting on his own, something that Set himself is also unaware of. During the final battle, as Sadie performs a banishing spell for Set, the advice of her mother causes her to look into the sky and see Apophis within the rift opened by the spell and she finally understands the truth. Breaking the spell, Sadie uses the Feather of Truth to reveal Apophis to both her brother Carter and Set. Enraged, Apophis has Face of Horror attack Sadie, but Carter kills him with his sword. As the demon dies, Apophis taunts them at what he had managed to accomplish through only a fragment of himself before the fragment rejoins Apophis in the closing rift. Recognizing that Apophis is returning and is the greater threat, the Kanes make a deal with Set rather than banishing him.

In The Throne of Fire, the Kanes and their allies work to combat Apophis' inevitable escape by locating and restoring Ra to power. At the same time, Apophis has magician assassin Vladimir Menshikov, one of his allies, hunt the Kanes and sends various monsters after them. Despite the best efforts of Apophis' forces, the Kanes manage to awaken Ra, but he is in a weakened and senile state. In a final confrontation in the cavern holding Apophis' prison, the Kanes learn that the price of retrieving Khepri – Ra's final aspect – is the release of Apophis from his prison. Sadie nevertheless completes the spell, taking the final beetle of Khepri's form and releasing Apophis who possesses Menshikov to fight the Kanes directly, proving to be more than a match for them. However, House of Life Chief Lector Michel Desjardins arrives to help after finally believing that the Kanes are telling the truth. Desjardins performs an execration spell on Apophis, a spell that uses a small representation of a target to completely erase the spell's target. However, as a god, Apophis cannot be killed by the spell which only destroys Menshikov and banishes the serpent a little deeper into the Duat, buying the Kanes time to escape with Ra. Desjardins dies after using up all of his life force to banish Apophis.

In The Serpent's Shadow, Apophis is in an all-out war with the House of Life and has secretly allied himself with the rebel magicians who are fighting against Amos Kane's leadership of the House of Life, putting the Kanes and their allies into a two-front war that they are slowly losing. The Kanes learn that Apophis intends to rise on the fall equinox while having the rebels attack the First Nome at the same time. With Ra still in a senile state, the Kanes desperately search for a way to defeat Apophis and learn that he has been destroying copies of the Book of Overcoming Apophis written by Setne and attempt to secure the last copy resulting in a battle that destroys the Fifty-First Nome and kills many of their remaining allies. Sadie manages to banish Apophis from the battle by invoking Ma'at, but the effort involved nearly kills her. However, the magicians manage to recover a shadow box containing King Tut's sheut or shadow which is a part of his soul. Carter comes upon the idea of using Apophis' own shadow in a stronger execration spell which Anubis reveals is possible, but is highly secret and forbidden magic as such a spell could destroy even a god forever. With the help of Setne, Carter and Zia Rashid seek out Apophis' shadow which has been absorbing the souls of many people, including their mother, to help boost the serpent's power. The two manage to capture the shadow and escape with the unexpected help of elderly gods from the Duat.

Upon emerging in the mortal world, it is discovered that Apophis has begun his attack which is only held off only by Bast. While the Kanes rush to help their friends, Ra, reborn after taking Zia as a host, Sobek and Bes join the fight to hold him off. After defeating the rebel magicians, Carter calls upon the gods to join the battle, but even together they prove to be no match for Apophis who kills Nekhbet and swallows Ra, darkening the sun. With all hope seemingly lost, Carter and Sadie, with the help of Horus and Isis, cast the shadow execration upon Apophis while Bast and Bes hold Apophis off to buy them the time that they need. As he casts the spell, Carter comes to the understanding that Apophis' shadow is more than just a "backup copy" of a person's soul, it stands for their legacy, their impact on the world. With no shadow, a person's existence becomes meaningless and they cannot be alive. As a result, even if Apophis manages to survive the spell, it will cut his connection to the mortal world and he will never be able to rise again. Apophis defeats Bes and Bast, but is too late to stop the Kanes from finishing the spell, destroying his shadow. All of the souls that the shadow had consumed are released and it shatters his legacy upon the world, causing all of the wars, murders, turmoil and anarchy Apophis has caused since ancient times to lose their power and finally stop casting their shadow across the world's future. As he dies, Apophis warns the Kanes that they have not just killed him, but they have exiled the gods as well because Ma'at and Chaos are linked and to push one away is to push the other away. As Apophis tells the Kanes that Ra will die within him, Ra suddenly explodes out of Apophis, blowing Apophis' head apart. Apophis is destroyed and crumbles into sand and steaming goo.

==== Setne ====
Setne is an evil magician and the son of Ramses the Great. His real name is Prince Khaemwaset, but he hates it. He is a secondary antagonist in The Serpent's Shadow and the primary antagonist of Demigods and Magicians. He is mentioned to have performed a number of evil deeds for which he has always managed to get away with. These are stated to include causing the French Revolution and triggering World War I. He is also known to have traveled and explored extensively and to have stolen a number of spell books that he should never have gotten his hands on and to have created a number of his own spells. His ultimate ambition is to become a god himself and his power is only constrained by the fact that he is long dead and is currently a ghost.

In The Serpent's Shadow, the Kanes and their allies seek out the last copy of the Book of Overcoming Apophis written by Setne, having come to the conclusion that it holds the secret to defeating the evil god since he has specifically targeted all of the existing copies. Setne himself appears to Sadie, warning her that she will need his help and to save a shadow box. The book is destroyed, but the shadow box presents a clue that causes the Kanes to realize that Setne may have developed a way to kill an immortal being using their shadows or sheuts. With Setne facing oblivion in the Underworld, the Kanes convince their father Julius and Osiris to lend Setne to them and he leads Carter and Zia to the Book of Thoth and then into the Land of Demons to get Apophis' shadow. After several foiled betrayals, Setne manages to subdue Carter and Zia and reveals that he intends to force Apophis to obey his commands, having needed their help only to get the shadow. The timely arrival of Sadie foils Setne's plan, but he somehow manages to escape with the Book of Thoth and the dangerous magic within. The magic that Setne taught the Kanes enables them to destroy Apophis forever and restore Bes, but they are left concerned by the implications of his escape. Julius states that Setne was bound to get away again and that the best they could've hoped for was that he would help them long enough to get the shadow and the spell.

In Demigods and Magicians, Setne begins using hybrid Greek-Egyptian magic from the Book of Thoth, repeatedly drawing the attention of the Kanes, Percy and Annabeth to stop him. In The Crown of Ptolemy, Setne enacts his ultimate plan by stealing the crown of Egypt and the power of the goddesses Wadjet and Nekhbet to finally become a god himself. Unable to defeat Setne with their individual powers, the Kanes, Percy and Annabeth share their powers with each other so that the demigods are using magician abilities and the magicians are using demigod abilities which proves to be highly effective against Setne, allowing them to retrieve the Book of Thoth. In a final effort, the Kanes and Annabeth perform a spell from the Book of Thoth to imprison Setne while Percy becomes the host of Nekhbet to fight Setne directly. Ultimately, after falling into the ocean, Percy's natural power from Poseidon combined with his borrowed power from Nekhbet allows him to overpower Setne and strip him of all of his stolen power. However, Percy chooses not to destroy Setne as he is not the kind of person to do that despite Nekhbet pushing him to do it. The completed spell then traps Setne forever inside of a snow globe which becomes a paperweight on Carter's desk.

In the Brooklyn House Magician's Manual, Setne is shown plotting to escape after his prison is accidentally cracked by one of Sadie's spells after which he intends to take the Book of Thoth, travel into the Duat and finally become a god. However, his eventual escape is actually anticipated by the Kanes and engineered so that it does not happen when no one's watching which would be bad for everyone. Although Setne causes some minor chaos, he is tracked by Walt and Anubis who, due to Anubis' powers over death, are able to track him even while he's invisible. Setne is ultimately trapped in a mastaba and bound by multiple containment spells to contain him until he faces judgment in the Underworld.

=== Egyptian deities ===
- Babi – Babi is a baboon god who takes Mr. Faust as host, helping Nekhbet test Sadie. He later participates in the final battle with Apophis.
- Bast – Bast is the cat goddess and Ra's guardian. In ancient times, she was sent by Ra to fight Apophis after the latter ascended to the heavens, which she continues to do until Julius and Ruby Kane release her. She then takes as host a cat named "Muffin" and makes a pact to guard Sadie. Bast then becomes Carter and Sadie's guardian after the two become magicians, and becomes quite close to them. In The Red Pyramid, she sacrifices herself fighting Sobek to protect Sadie, but is brought back from Duat by the gods as reward for the Kanes after they defeat Set. Alongside Bes, she continues to act as their friend, mentor and protector. In The Tower of Nero, she is mentioned to have been meeting with Chiron and Mimir about an unidentified threat to all of the pantheons.
- Bes – Bes is the god of dwarfs and protector of the innocent. He has romantic feelings for Bast, and answers her request that he watch over Carter and Sadie. He befriends the two and sacrifices his ren to give them enough time to reach Apophis' prison. The two later manage to restore him, and he goes on to pursue a relationship with the goddess Tawaret.
- Geb – Geb is the god of the earth. Father of Osiris, Isis, Horus, Set, and Nephthys; husband of Nut. His physical manifestation is the entire earth.
- Hapi – Hapi is the god of the Nile river. In The Serpent's Shadow, he is summoned by Carter using a spell from Setne, and asked to defeat a monster sent by Apophis. Hapi also helps Carter and Zia cross the Nile to reach the temple of the Apis Bull. Hapi is described as huge, blue-skinned, and well-fed.
- Heket – Heket is a frog goddess who lost her power when her temples were destroyed and people stopped worshiping her. She is currently living in Sunny Acres Assisted-Living Community, a place for senile gods and goddesses.
- Horus – Horus is the god of war. He led the gods until Ra's return, and again after Apophis is destroyed. Part of his spirit resides in Carter. His symbol is the Eye of Horus. He is one of the five gods born during the Demon Days, the son of Geb and Nut. He is also frequently described as the son of Osiris and Isis.
- Isis – Isis is the goddess of magic, briefly incarnated by Sadie. She is one of the five children of Geb and Nut, and mother of Horus. She is responsible for Ra's ascendance from the mortal world. When she wanted her husband Osiris to claim Ra's throne, she created a serpent to poison Ra. When he revealed to her his secret name, she cured him but also forced him to abdicate the throne.
- Khonsu – Khonsu is the moon god. He was a trickster who liked to play senet, a board game, with deadly bet in return for a lengthened time; Nut once played a game with him so she could gain enough time to give birth to her five children. In The Throne of Fire, the Kanes and Bes played senet with him so they could gain more time for the gates of Duat to open; when they lose a round, Bes sacrificed his ren, which caused him to lose his memories until the Kanes managed to find his sheut in The Serpent's Shadow.
- Mekhit and Onuris – Mekhit and Onuris are two war gods who were forgotten by humans and thus had to live in Sunny Acres. Onuris disappeared due to his senility, which made Mekhit mournful. He is found again in The Serpent's Shadow, and later fights alongside his wife with the retired gods who helped the Kanes.
- Neith – Neith is the goddess of hunting. She briefly appears in The Serpent's Shadow when Sadie and Walt trick her into helping them, and later fights alongside them against Apophis.
- Nekhbet – Nekhbet is the vulture goddess who takes Mrs. Faust and Percy as hosts. She is a follower of Ra, but refuses to follow the weak. As a result, she "tests" Sadie's strength by attempting to kill her, her family, and her friends. It is revealed in The Crown of Ptolemy that Nekhbet possesses the crown of Upper Egypt, which Setne steals, although she manages to avoid Wadjet's fate of having her essence absorbed thanks to the Heroes. She proceeds to assist them to recover her crown, taking Percy as a host and lending him her powers.
- Nephthys – Nephthys is the goddess of rivers, wife of Set, mother of Anubis, and one of the five children of Geb and Nut. She was once incarnated by Zia.
- Nut – Nut is the sky goddess, mother of Osiris, Isis, Horus, Set, and Nephthys and the wife of Geb. Due to a prophecy that one of her children would unseat him, Ra forbade Nut to give birth on any day of the year. She gambled with the god Khonsu to earn five extra days worth of moonlight to have her children and was punished by Ra. He forbade her to ever see her husband again, and tasked her father Shu with keeping them apart. Her physical manifestation is the sky itself.
- Osiris – Osiris is the god of the dead, incarnated in The Red Pyramid by Julius Kane. He is one of Geb and Nut's five children. His symbol is the "Spine of Osiris", or the djed. He is frequently described as having blue skin, representing the fact that he is "dead". He was once king of the gods until his brother Set imprisoned and later killed him. His wife Isis and sister Nepthys searched for his body to revive him with magic, but were only able to make him pharaoh of the Duat.
- Ptah – Ptah is the god of craftsmen and creation, summoned by Sadie and Walt to help them get a piece of the Book of Ra.
- Ra – Ra is the sun god. Retired to the heavens, but revived in The Throne of Fire; later merges with Zia and recovers his lost mental integrity. Consumed by Apophis and later revived by Sadie and Carter. He was the first and greatest king of the gods, and undertook nightly journeys through the Duat to battle the forces of chaos. After the destruction of Apophis, he retires to the heavens once again and takes the other gods with him aside from Anubis.
  - Khnum – Khnum is Ra's evening aspect who created man out of clay using a potter's wheel. In The Throne of Fire, the Kanes meet him near the entrance of the Duat and have one chance to guess his name, which he had forgotten after so long. Sadie eventually gave him his ren, and he allows them to pass on to revive his other aspects.
  - Khepri – Khepri is Ra's morning aspect, which takes the form of a golden beetle. The Kanes found it near the exit of Duat and had to battle Vladimir Menshikov, possessed by Apophis, to give it to Ra and thereby restore his final aspect. Ra later gives Khepri to Zia Rashid who is able to channel his powers. Khepri also protects Zia and Carter from the power of Chaos in the Land of Demons.
- Sekhmet – Sekhmet is the goddess of lions. She can be summoned by a Chief Lector once in his/her lifetime, and attacks Carter, Sadie, Zia, and Amos at the command of Michel Desjardins. She is the lieutenant of Ra and a master of destruction.
  - Hathor – Hathor is the goddess of cows, and alter ego of Sekhmet. She is summoned whenever Sekhmet is tired, and represents her peaceful side.
- Serqet – Serqet is the goddess of scorpions. In The Red Pyramid, she attacked Carter, Sadie, and Bast after the three had escaped from Brooklyn House, forcing Bast to retreat while the Kanes were saved by Zia. She reappears in The Serpent's Shadow where she helps to battle Apophis.
- Shezmu – Shezmu is the god of execution. In The Red Pyramid, he prevented the Kanes from entering Duat unless they told him his secret name, although he ended up revealing it to Sadie while the three compromised.
- Shu – Shu is the god of the air, and father of Nut and Geb. He separates Nut from Geb to form the present-day division of Sky from Earth. Later appears to criticize Anubis' infatuation with Sadie although he helps at the same time by teleporting a young Russian magician to Brooklyn after being summoned by the young man. After Anubis becomes hosted by Walt Stone, he tells Sadie that Shu will no longer intervene, but will likely keep an eye on them nonetheless.
- Sobek – Sobek is the god of crocodiles, who appears as a minor antagonist in The Red Pyramid serving Set. Bast is forced to sacrifice herself to defeat him. Sobek returns in The Serpent's Shadow guarding Ra on his nightly journey. It is stated that Sobek apparently only agreed to join their side because Horus and Isis had threatened him with extreme bodily harm otherwise. He joins Ra and Bast in holding Apophis off. In The Son of Sobek, Carter and Percy face off against the petsuchos, Sobek's sacred animal which is also known as the Son of Sobek. Sobek is mentioned a few times in relation to the monster and Carter's previous encounters with the god.
- Taweret – Taweret is the goddess of hippos and childbirth and assists the Kanes. As a protector of the innocent (specifically children), like the god Bes, she is very familiar with him and has romantic feelings for him. At first these are unreciprocated as he is in love with Bast, but he comes to appreciate and care for her after she takes care of him when he has lost his ren. Tawaret is the sole nurse in the Sunny Acres retirement community for old gods, located in the Duat.
- Thoth – Thoth is the god of knowledge and founder of the House of Life. "Thoth" was actually his Greek name; the Egyptians called him Djehuti. He is the only god who is accepted by the House of Life and is allowed to inhabit the mortal world; he is found in Memphis in various locations. Carter and Sadie seek him out for advice on two separate occasions.
- Wadjet – Wadjet is a cobra goddess who makes a brief appearance in The Crown of Ptolemy where Setne summons her, steals her crown of Lower Egypt, and then steals her essence, killing her. She is freed after the Kanes, Percy, and Annabeth defeat Setne.

=== Magicians ===
==== Brooklyn House trainees ====
- Jasmine "Jaz" Anderson – Jaz is one of the novitiate magicians in Brooklyn House. She is a blonde cheerleader from Nashville, Tennessee. Her specialty is healing magic and studies the goddess Sekhmet as all Egyptian healers do. She is put into a coma after banishing some sickness demons in The Throne of Fire, from which she is awakened by Ra. She shares with Sadie how to cure Carter using his ren when he is bitten by a tjesu heru. She later appears in The Serpent's Shadow and her healing potions appear in The Son of Sobek and The Staff of Serapis.
- Alyssa – Alyssa is a trainee of the twenty-first Nome with a particular skill for pottery and shabti-making. She studies the power of Geb.
- Cleo – Cleo is one of the young magicians at Brooklyn House. She is from Rio de Janeiro. She speaks Portuguese (as being her mother language) and she often switches back to Portuguese when she's anxious. Cleo studies the god Thoth and will likely be Brooklyn House's next librarian. Though she is an excellent researcher, she does not have much of a stomach for violence.
- Felix – Felix is a trainee at Brooklyn House. He has a strange obsession with penguins and seems to be able to channel ice magic, although it is unknown which Egyptian god this corresponds to. In The Tower of Nero, Rachel mentions seeing Brooklyn House and some of Felix's penguins, which greatly confuses her.
- Julian – Julian is a trainee. Like Carter, he incarnates the power of Horus.
- Sean – Sean is an Irish trainee at Brooklyn House.
- Shelby – Shelby is a young trainee at Brooklyn House, the ringleader of the group of toddler trainees known as the "anklebiters". Her magic is mostly impulsive.
- Tucker – Tucker is a trainee at Brooklyn House.
- Leonid – Leonid is a young Russian magician who first encountered the Kanes when they visited Saint Petersburg. He defects to the "side" of the gods and, with the help of the god Shu, brings Sadie and Carter information during The Serpent's Shadow.

==== Other magicians ====
- Julius Kane – Julius Kane is Carter and Sadie's father. He is a doctor of Egyptology. After a failed attempt to release the Egyptian goddess Bast back into the world kills his wife, he works to find a way to release them again and becomes host to Osiris. He ultimately succeeds, dies of his own free will, and goes to "live" as the god's physical manifestation in the Underworld, overseeing the Hall of Judgment.
- Ruby Kane – Ruby Kane was Carter and Sadie's mother, who appears occasionally as a spirit to advise her children. She was a magician and diviner who foresaw Apophis' rise and ultimate victory if the other gods were not there to stop him. As a result, she and her husband attempted to release Bast from her eternal battle with Apophis so the goddess could heal before his inevitable rise. She gave her life to close the portal they opened using Cleopatra's Needle, because Apophis was fighting to get out. Ruby also communed with Isis at some point in her career as a magician, and attempted to convince then-Chief Lector Iskandar to remand his policy of fighting the gods.
- Vladimir Menshikov – Menshikov is the antagonist of The Throne of Fire. Menshikov's intense hatred of the gods and desire for power leads to his possession by Apophis. He manipulates Michel Desjardins into permitting him to hunt the Kane family. When Desjardins finally discovers his involvement, he uses up all his energy in an execration of the chaos demon and, by extension, Menshikov, who is then killed. Menshikov is described by Sadie and Carter as an "evil ice cream man" because of his tendency to wear white suits and glasses because of his heavily scarred face.
- Sarah Jacobi – Sarah is the leader of a group of rebel magicians. She is a former House scribe imprisoned for causing the 2004 Indian Ocean earthquake and tsunami. In The Serpent's Shadow, she manages to amass an alliance of rebels in league with Apophis, but is vanquished by Anubis/Walt Stone, who summon spirits to pull her into the Underworld.
- Kwai – Kwai is Sarah's assistant. He is the House of Life's persistent opponent throughout the later books and also a brief host of Apophis. After being defeated by Walt Stone/Anubis, he uses the last of his life force in an effort to bring down the Hall of Ages upon the combatants, killing Kwai in the process. However, Sadie succeeds in foiling his plan.

== Magnus Chase and the Gods of Asgard ==
=== Main characters ===
==== Magnus Chase ====
Magnus Chase is the main protagonist of the series and is the cousin of Annabeth. A 16-year-old Bostonian teenager, Magnus lost his mother Natalie Chase to a mysterious wolf attack two years prior to the events of The Sword of Summer and is forced to live in the streets with his homeless friends, Blitz and Hearth. On his 16th birthday, his uncle, Randolph, informs him of his divine parentage as a son of a Norse god and his inheritance of Sumarbrander, the sword that once belonged to his father Frey. After being killed by Surt, a fire giant, Magnus is then carried to Hotel Valhalla by Samirah Al-Abbas, a Valkyrie. He then finds out that his father is Frey, the god of peace, wealth and prosperity, who belongs to the Vanir tribe of Norse deities.

Magnus is described as having blond hair that reaches his chin and haunting gray eyes that resemble his cousin, Annabeth's. He is said to look like Kurt Cobain and has asthma. His scrawny look is replaced by a more muscular persona after his death and acceptance to Valhalla.

He mainly uses the Sword of Summer, Jack, who attacks autonomously. Magnus' demigod abilities concern healing and warmth: through concentration, Magnus is able to heal even the mortally injured (though doing so often causes him to read the subject's memories) and once made a mortal (Sam's fiancé) see through Ginnungagap and into the Norse world. Magnus can also summon the Peace of Frey that can disarm everyone who is close to him.

==== Blitzen ====
Blitzen "Blitz" is a dwarf or, more specifically, a svartalf from Nidavellir. He is the son of a Vanir, Freya, making him Magnus' cousin. He is sent alongside Hearth by Mimir to watch and protect Magnus. Though he keeps it up for two years, the task fails when Magnus is killed, but Blitz continues to look for him until they are reunited in Valhalla. As a dwarf, Blitz is sensitive to sunlight and will slowly turn to stone if exposed too much. Instead of forging, Blitz excels in clothing design, making him a laughing stock among his fellow dwarfs, but after he wins a match against Eitri Junior, he becomes respected and eventually opens up a clothing shop. In battle, Blitz uses his creations to assist himself, including chain-mail bow ties and vests. Blitz has had a strong relationship with Hearth ever since the former saved the latter's life, and the two are very protective of each other.

==== Hearthstone ====
Hearthstone "Hearth" is a light elf from Alfheim. He is skinny with pale skin and with short spiky blond hair, which, when combined with his black leather jacket, jeans, and a candy cane scarf, renders his appearance rather monochromatic. Hearth is deaf and can only communicate with ASL (Alf Sign Language) and he has trauma, though he is able to read lips. Since his "home" world is always bright, he is sensitive to darkness. He is also a protector of Magnus. Hearth is the first elf in a long time to focus on magic from runes, which he has studied extensively. He can cast various runes, though doing such consumes his energy. Eventually, he progresses to the rank of a full sorcerer.

==== Samirah al-Abbas ====
Samirah "Sam" al-Abbas Bint Loki is a Valkyrie and daughter of Loki who selects Magnus as an einherji under Odin's order. She is an Arab American who normally wears her Valkyrie armor and a green hijab, which doubles as camouflage. She leads a double life as both a Valkyrie and a normal high schooler. She does not worship the Norse gods as she is Muslim and believes in Allah. Her family is from Baghdad, but has been raised by her grandparents in Dorchester since the death of her mother. Sam's family already had a long history with the Vikings, even before her mother met Loki; Ahmad ibn Fadlan, a historian and envoy of the Abbasid Caliph to the Kievan Rus', is one of Sam's ancestors, and the Varangians have since intermarried with Sam's family. The Norse also distrust her for being Loki's daughter. Sam is married to her childhood crush, Amir Fadlan, who works in a falafel shop.

In The Sword of Summer, Sam is expelled from Valhalla when her video of Magnus' heroic death is edited by Gunilla, but later joins Magnus, Blitz, and Hearth in stopping Fenris Wolf from breaking free. She is eventually reinstated as Valkyrie and gets another job as Odin's personal aide. In The Hammer of Thor, Sam is unwillingly betrothed by Loki to Thrym in exchange for Mjolnir; in reality, Loki wants the Skofnung, with which he can finally free himself. Sam is then given a task by Odin to head toward Scandinavia and personally imprison Loki back before he is able to invade Midgard and eventually Asgard. In The Ship of the Dead, Sam participates in the quest to stop the Naglfar from sailing in Niflheim and has sufficiently trained with Alex enough that she is immune to Loki's influence. The quest is challenging for her not only because of its danger, but also because she is fasting for Ramadan.

As a fighter, Sam wields a Valkyrie ax, spear of light, or dagger. She has also inherited her father's ability to shapeshift into animals, but doing so makes her uncomfortable, as it causes her to become more like Loki. Sam wants to become a pilot and enjoys being a Valkyrie because it affords her a chance to fly (albeit through levitation, not piloting).

==== Sumarbrander ====
The Sword of Summer (Jack) was Frey's weapon, currently wielded by Magnus Chase. After Magnus finds out that the sword is sentient, Sumarbrander decides to name itself Jack, and be referred to as a male. In battle Magnus can let the sword attack his enemies on its own or use his own strength and control the sword himself. Either way, it is Magnus who loses energy ultimately, though this loss is delayed until he next grips or sheathes Jack.

He bears a grudge against Frey, who "abandoned" him, by giving him to Skirnir as a price for the latter bringing the former a Giantess with whom he fell in love; he summarizes this by once admonishing Frey, saying "blades before babes".

He reached Boston with one of Skirnir's descendants during the Viking expansion, where he was lost for centuries until he was recovered by Magnus.

==== Alex Fierro ====
Alex Fierro is a child of Loki and Mr. Fierro and is introduced in Magnus Chase and the Hammer of Thor. She is gender-fluid, similar to Loki, who was known to change genders in myths. She prefers pronouns coinciding with her gender at the moment (Note: Alex sometimes uses he/him pronouns and other times uses she/her pronouns; she/her is used in this article for simplicity due to her identifying as that more often.) rather than "they". When in Valhalla, she is referred to as an argr, the Old Norse word for "unmanly", due to being assigned male but identifying as a woman most of the time. Unlike her half-sister, Sam, Alex was born via Loki's female form, thus making the god her mother rather than her father. Like Sam, she resents her mother; however, Alex seems to be able to resist Loki much easier than Sam. She, like Magnus, is homeless, in her case due to her father disagreeing with her gender-fluidity. Nevertheless, she treasures her Fierro heritage, an ancient family who had lived near Mexico City as potters since before the time of the Aztecs.

In The Hammer of Thor, Alex goes to Jotunheim alongside Magnus and the others to visit Utgard-Loki and find out about Loki's plan about Sam's betrothal. She becomes Sam's double during her betrothal and forms a friendship with Sif. In The Ship of the Dead, Alex has trained Sam to resist Loki's influence and participates in the quest to Scandinavia to stop Naglfar from sailing. She grows closer with Magnus and kisses him when the group is struggling to reach Skadi's fortress in Niflheim. The kiss is recounted by Magnus during his flyting with Loki as the greatest thing to have ever happened to him. By the end of the book, they share another kiss but this time male and offers to assist Magnus in running the Chase Space, a shelter for the homeless youth.

Alex uses a gold garrote wire as a weapon, which formally used to be a pottery wire. She can shape-shift into animals, like Loki, and is far more comfortable with embracing this power than her half-sister, Sam.

=== Norse deities ===
The Norse gods fall into two general groups: the Aesir and the Vanir. All are referred to generally as "Asgardians", but the Vanir inhabit Vanaheim as often as Asgard. The Aesir are more warlike, while the Vanir are peaceful. Specifically, however, the gods tend to be distinguished by what side they fought on during the Aesir-vanir war, and not by their personal temperaments.

==== Aesir ====
The following Norse gods are considered the more warlike of the two strains of immortals.

- Frigg – The queen of the Aesir and wife of Odin, the goddess of knowledge, wisdom, and forethought. As Odin frequently travels through the Nine Worlds, Frigg is left in charge of Asgard most of the time. Sam idolizes her among the Aesir as she is the glue that keeps the gods together. According to Sam, no einherji or valkyrie have ever seen Frigg in person. The Ship of the Dead reveals that she is the mother of Mallory, whom she gives a walnut capable of trapping anything inside it.
- Heimdall – The all-seeing, all-hearing god of vigilance and guardian of Bifrost, the entrance of Asgard, who was born from nine mothers. He has a hobby of taking selfies, using his horn Gjallar as a phablet and a selfie stick, which tends to make him forget to directly oversee the Nine Worlds.
- Kvasir – An Aesir born from the saliva of the gods, created as a peace treaty following the Aesir-Vanir war. He walked through the Nine Worlds giving advice to beings, but he fell to a trap by Fjalar and Galar, who killed him and drained his blood to create the Mead of Poetry.
- Loki – The god of evil and trickery. He is the father of Samirah Al Abbas. He can also become female, having turned into a mare to give birth to the eight-legged horse Sleipnir and later into a red-haired woman to give birth to the demigod Alex Fierro, who like Loki, is gender-fluid. After tricking Hod to kill Balder, he is chained to a rock with the entrails of his sons as chains with poison from a snake dripping onto his face constantly. He makes it his personal goal to break free and take revenge against the gods in Ragnarok, using his trickery to manipulate people around him even when he is incorporeal. He finally manages to break free at the end of The Hammer of Thor and begins the preparations to sail in the Naglfar to declare Ragnarok. In The Ship of the Dead, despite managing to shame Magnus greatly during their flyting duel, he is overpowered when Magnus flytes him with the power of his friends long enough for Mallory to trap him inside a magical walnut. Odin later sentences Loki to be chained again to the rock.
- Mímir – The god of knowledge and wisdom. He was beheaded during the Æsir-Vanir War and only his head remains alive. He is the boss of Blitz and Hearth due to a deal they made to drink from his well. The deal is nullified by Odin at the end of The Sword of Summer as their reward for dealing with the Fenris Wolf.
- Odin – The king of the Aesir, the god of royalty and magic. He is able to rewrite reality by spelling out runes, which he learned after hanging for nine days on a branch of Yggdrasil. Odin is the owner and proprietor of Hotel Valhalla where he is always away on important businesses where he searches for knowledge and leaves the important decisions to his management. His ravens and wolves represent him at meetings. In The Sword of Summer, Odin is claimed to have disappeared two years before Magnus' acceptance as an einherji, but he actually disguises himself as X the Troll, and one of Magnus' floormates. At the end of the book, Odin reveals himself and rewards Magnus and his friends for their bravery against the Fenris Wolf. He likes to give presentations.
- Ran – The goddess of the sea, who operates a net that collects anything that falls into the sea. She has an apple of Idun, but forgets to consume it, which contributes to her elderly appearance. Magnus and Sam manage to convince her to give them the apple and Sumarbrander, but she warns that doing so has made her and Aegir bent on attacking Magnus.
- Sif – The goddess of the earth and Thor's self-proclaimed "trophy wife". After losing her hair due to Loki's trick, she now has golden hair that can be melded into precious objects, inspiring the legend of Rapunzel. Sam and Alex, both Loki's children, do not like her; the former states that Sif is vain and accepts her hair replacement and title because she does not understand that Loki is merely playing with her. Alex, however, begins to have respect for her after she helps her dress for Thrym's wedding ceremony.
- Sigyn – Loki's wife. She reduces his punishment by collecting venom dripped by the venomous snake in a bowl, though it is never enough to alleviate them from torturing him. When Loki is about to free himself in The Hammer of Thor, she appears to make an attempt to delay the escape, but later goes with him anyway when the Asgardians come. She is present during Magnus and Loki's flyting duel; when Loki indirectly insults her by claiming that he stands by himself, she leaves the area, dealing the final blow to the flyting once Magnus points out that Loki has no one to care for him. She is described as having eyes that tear blood, as well as a perpetually blank expression.
- Thor – The god of lightning, storms, and strength. He has an unkempt appearance, is lazy, and is also up-to-date with modern television shows. He has red hair, huge muscles and a dirty face. He wears a sleeveless, leather jerkin and is very loud. He tasks Magnus and his friends with retrieving his staff, which was stolen from him by Geirrod. He has two talking goats, Tanngrisnir and Tanngnjostr, nicknamed Otis and Marvin. His hammer is currently missing, which becomes an important plot point in The Hammer of Thor, where he regains it.
- Tyr – The god of courage, law, and trial by combat. He lost his hand due to Fenris Wolf's bite. All of his children, T.J. included, are naturally inclined to accept challenges. He appears at the end of The Ship of the Dead, congratulating T.J. for stopping Loki from starting Ragnarok.
- Vidar – The god of revenge, also called the "Silent One" due to his method of communicating with ASL. He is sensible and snarky, a complete opposite of his brother Thor.

==== Vanir ====
These gods are generally more peaceful and dislike the warlike nature of the Aesir:

- Frey – The god of fertility, warmth, and healing, the twin brother of Freya, and the father of Magnus. Frey owned a sword, Sumarbrander, which was given to Skirnir in return for his help in wooing a beautiful giantess; as a result, he is unarmed by the time of Ragnarok and will be killed by Surt. Though Magnus never meets his father until the end of The Sword of Summer, he realizes that all the times his mother took him hiking through the wilderness was a way for them to get closer to Frey.
- Freya – The goddess of love and warmth and the twin sister of Frey. She is described as very beautiful. She presides over Vanaheim, where the other half of worthy souls go after death, and casts warmth that shines over it. Freya is the mother of most dwarves in Nidavellir, including Blitz, which happened because she bartered to (briefly) marry some dwarves in exchange for luxurious items. Freya tasks Blitz to get some earrings by challenging Junior.
- Njord – The god of fishery, seafaring, and crop fertility, the father of Frey and Freya, and Magnus' grandfather. He is a mortal enemy of Aegir and Ran, his influence stopping them from ravaging through the sea and reducing the mortal casualties. In The Ship of the Dead, he saves Magnus and company from being killed by Aegir's nine daughters and tells them to seek his ex-wife, Skaldi, if they want to prevent Loki from sailing in the Naglfar.

==== Other Norse gods ====
- Hel – The daughter of Loki who presides over Helheim, the realm where the unworthy dead go. One half of her is a very beautiful woman, while the other is a decaying corpse. She tries to persuade Magnus to give up Sumarbrander to Randolph, but he refuses.
- Norns – A trio of female figures who can see the past, present, and future. They recite a prophecy to Magnus that kickstarts his journey to stop Fenris Wolf from breaking free.
- Fear – A minor God who assists the Mountain Giants. In The Hammer of Thor, it is sent to compete with Sam in a game of ax throwing under the guise of a Mountain Giant called Little Billy. Sam sees through the illusion and defeats it.

== Mortals ==
Mortals are human characters who live outside of the world of magic and gods, though some may be aware of their supernatural surroundings.

=== The Jackson family ===
- Sally Jackson – Sally Jackson is Percy's mother, initially married to Gabe Ugliano and later to Paul Blofis. In The Lightning Thief, she works in a candy shop. In The Titan's Curse, Percy learns she can see through the Mist, which she admits may have attracted Poseidon to her. Sally appears in all of the first five books. In The Hidden Oracle, she is seven months pregnant with Percy's baby half-sister. In The Ship of the Dead, it is revealed that Sally has given birth and that she called her daughter Estelle, after her late mother. In the film adaptation, she is portrayed by Catherine Keener. In the musical, she is portrayed by Zakiya Young (2014), Allison Hunt (2015), Carrie Compere (2017), and Jalynn Steele (2019). In the TV series, she is portrayed by Virginia Kull.
- Gabriel "Gabe" Ugliano – Gabe was Sally's first husband and Percy's stepfather. He was described as a loathsome man who is rude to Percy and demanding and rude toward Sally. It is implied that he was physically abusive to her as well. Percy later learns that Gabe's strong human stench hid Percy and his mother from detection by monsters. At the end of The Lightning Thief, Percy's mother uses the severed head of Medusa to turn Gabe to stone. Sally then sells Gabe's petrified body statue to the Soho art gallery, presenting him as a normal statue. In the film adaptation, he is played by Joe Pantoliano. In the TV series, he is portrayed by Timm Sharp.
- Paul Blofis – Paul is Sally Jackson's boyfriend and later her second husband, a high school English teacher. Percy and his mother eventually tell Paul the truth about the gods, and he only half believes them initially. But when Percy, Nico, and Mrs. O'Leary come unexpectedly to Sally's apartment, Paul fully believes and thinks it is "awesome". He is a competent swordsman from stage combat training in college, and he assists in the fight to save Olympus in The Last Olympian. Percy had first referred to him as "Blowfish" and as did Poseidon when he first heard about him.
- Estelle Blofis – Estelle is Sally and Paul's daughter and Percy's baby half-sister, named after her maternal grandmother. She was born sometime between the events of The Hidden Oracle and The Ship of the Dead. Babysitting her has added to Percy's workload, causing him to visit Camp Half-Blood less often. In The Chalice of the Gods, Sally reveals her pregnancy to her son and tells him that Estelle's expected due date is March 15.

=== The Chase family ===
- Caroline, Emma, and Aubrey Chase – Randolph Chase's nuclear family consists of a wife named Caroline and two daughters, Emma and Aubrey. All of them perish in a storm while accompanying Randolph in locating Sumarbrander near the coast of Boston. Loki has since promised to Randolph to return them to him should he assists the former to break free from his imprisonment. Emma was designated as Randolph's successor as researcher of Norse artefacts.
- Frederick Chase – Frederick Chase is Annabeth's father, a professor of military history. He first appears in The Titan's Curse. He owns a Sopwith Camel. He and his daughter have had many disagreements, which caused her to run away from home at age seven. He lives in San Francisco with his wife and two sons. In The Titan's Curse, he battles monsters on the Princess Andromeda with bullets formed from celestial bronze, and, at the end of the book, is able to mend his relationship with his daughter. Frederick also appears in Magnus Chase and the Gods of Asgard, where he is called by his brother, Randolph, to visit Boston and search for his long-estranged nephew, Magnus who had been missing for two years, after the death of his mother, Frederick and Randolph's sister Natalie. In the TV series, he will be portrayed by Jesse L. Martin.
- Mrs. Chase – Mrs. Chase is Frederick's wife and Annabeth's stepmother. She is an Asian woman and the mother of Annabeth's two half-brothers, with whom Annabeth barely has a relationship. She had a dispute over the trouble monsters caused when hunting Annabeth, and that was one of the factors that led Annabeth to run away from home at the age of 7. Though Annabeth describes her in a negative light, Percy is stunned when he actually meets Mrs. Chase, because she is kind and even wants Percy to tell Annabeth that she still has her home in San Francisco.
- Bobby and Matthew Chase – Bobby and Matthew are the sons of Fredrick and Mrs. Chase and Annabeth's younger half-brothers.
- Natalie Chase – Natalie is the younger sister of Randolph and Frederick, the aunt of Annabeth and the mother of Magnus. She distanced herself from her brothers and lived with Magnus as a single mother until her death at the hands of the wolves of Fenris Wolf when Magnus was 14 years old. She liked to walk with Magnus through sunlit parks, which Magnus realizes much later is a way for them to get closer with his father, Frey.
- Randolph Chase – Randolph is Magnus' and Annabeth's uncle and the older brother of Frederick and Natalie. He was a professor of history at Harvard before being expelled for theorizing on the location of the first great Norse settlement in North America. He deliberately distanced himself with from all of his family when Magnus was 6 years old. Randolph had lost his wife, Caroline, and two daughters, Emma and Aubrey, in an attempt to search for the Norse boat. Randolph is secretly in league with Loki, who wants Sumarbrander. In The Hammer of Thor, he works in freeing Loki with Skofnung Blade and falls to a hole that leads to Helheim. Magnus discovers that Randolph has designated him and Annabeth to inherit his property, including his mansion, which Magnus converts to a shelter for homeless youth at the end of The Ship of the Dead.

=== The Valdez family ===
- Aunt Rosa – Rosa is Leo's aunt. She blamed Leo for causing the death of her sister, Esperanza. She turned his whole family against him and called him "El Diablo" (The Devil). She refused to take him in and sent him to a social services home, which he ran away from. In The Mark of Athena, Leo sees Nemesis as Aunt Rosa, as Nemesis takes the form of the person whom the viewer has the most hatred for.
- Esperanza Valdez – Esperanza was Leo's mother. She was a trained mechanical engineer who worked at a machine shop and as an inventor. She was killed in a fire caused by Gaea and only appears in flashbacks. She was compassionate and hard-working and was described as pretty, but not delicate.
- Sammy Valdez – Sammy is Leo's great-grandfather and Hazel's former boyfriend. He is described as looking identical to Leo. He and Hazel studied in a segregated school for the colored, and Sammy defended Hazel whenever she was accused for being the daughter of a witch. Hazel received her first kiss from Sammy. However, the two separated when Hazel had to move to Alaska with her mother and never met with each other again since Hazel died shortly after. Though Hazel was led to believe that Sammy moved on quickly, a flashback she has in The Mark of Athena makes her realize that Sammy remembered her well into his old age and had made the then newborn Leo promise to meet with her on his behalf.

=== The McLean family ===
- Thomas McLean – Tristan's and Piper's late father and grandfather, respectively. He gave Piper her name. Thomas believed in Cherokee myths, which are quite similar with Greek mythology.
- Tristan McLean – Piper's father, a movie star who was one of Aphrodite's lovers, but did not at that time know that she was a goddess. He was captured by Enceladus in The Lost Hero, but Piper and her friends saved him. At the end of The Lost Hero, he is said to be back at work, though he does not remember the events of his capture. Like Piper, he identifies as Cherokee.
  - Jane – Jane is Tristan's assistant. Piper dislikes her for taking Tristan's already little attention to bond with his daughter away from her. Through charmspeak, Jane is controlled by Medea to lure Tristan into Mount Diablo where he is kidnapped by Enceladus, and then shooing Piper away so she could not interfere. Nevertheless, Piper discovers the trick and rescue her father. Afterwards, Jane is fired and replaced by Mellie.

=== The Al Abbas family ===
- Ayesha Al Abbas – Ayesha is Sam's late mother who worked as a doctor. Loki was one of her patients, and their intimate relationship that resulted in Sam's birth was resented by her conservative family due to its illegitimacy. She died when Sam was a child, and her responsibility for Sam was taken by her parents.
- Jid and Bibi – Jid and Bibi are Sam's maternal grandparents. They are natives of Baghdad and immigrated to the United States before Sam was born. Jid and Bibi took care of Sam after the death of their daughter, Ayesha. Sam mentions that the two are strict on her education and impose a night curfew on her. They do not know about Sam's current occupation as a Valkyrie until Loki tells them in the events of The Hammer of Thor, and even then, due to their mortal mind, they forget about it quickly.
  - Amir Fadlan – Amir is Sam's fiancé. Their betrothal is by arrangement, though Sam says that she fell in love with him when she was 12 years old, at a very young age. Like Sam, Amir is an Arab American descendant of Ahmad ibn Fadlan and thus is related to her. He is the son of Abdel, the owner of a falafel shop that Magnus frequents. In The Hammer of Thor, Amir is shocked upon learning Sam's double life and at first disheartened when she appears to be breaking off their engagement. With his power, Magnus manages to make Amir able to break through the mist of Ginnungagap and see the Norse world. Sam later states that the two have sorted the misunderstanding and retained their engagement.

=== Bullies ===
The following characters have harassed the main characters:

- Nancy Bobofit – Nancy Bobofit was Percy and Grover's classmate in Yancy Academy in The Lightning Thief. She was a bully who frequently tormented Grover and got into conflicts with Percy. However, she was favored by Mrs. Dodds/Alecto, which irritated Percy. In The Lightning Thief, she was throwing food at Grover when suddenly she was doused in water from the fountain (later revealed to be Percy's water powers). After the incident, she avoided Percy. In the TV series, she is portrayed by Olivea Morton.
- Matt Sloan – Matt Sloan was Percy and Tyson's classmate in Meriwether Prep in The Sea of Monsters. He frequently targeted Tyson for his awkwardness and clumsiness, which came into direct conflict with Percy. He has a chipped tooth from running his family's extremely expensive car into a "Slow down for children" sign. He instigated dangerous events during their English exam and was the opposing team captain to Percy in the dodgeball game. When Percy was looking at a picture of Annabeth he had inside his notebook, Matt and his jerk gang proceeded to bully him for it. He also made six friends on the last day of school, who were revealed as Laistrygonians. After Tyson defeated the monsters in the dodgeball game, Matt blamed Percy for the incident which got Percy expelled and temporarily on the run from the police.
- Isabel – Isabel was Piper and Leo's classmate in the Wilderness School. She teased Piper for never meeting with her mother and for being a Cherokee, not knowing that Piper is the daughter of Hollywood star Tristan McLean.
- Rufus – Rufus was Hazel and Sammy's classmate in St. Agnes Academy for Colored Children and Indians during Hazel's first life. He was the leader of bullies and called Hazel a freak for summoning cursed stones and for being the daughter of a witch, but was always stopped by Sammy before he could hurt her even further.

=== Others ===
- Barry al-Jabbar – Barry al-Jabbar is a family friend of Sam and Amir who teaches the former piloting. In The Hammer of Thor, he escorted Magnus and company to Boston from Cape Cod and is briefly possessed by Utgard-Loki, who told Magnus to visit him.
- Beryl Grace – Beryl Grace was Thalia and Jason's mother. She was a television actress with whom Zeus broke his oath not to have more human children. Thalia describes her as flighty, demanding and neglectful of both her children, and Thalia would have run away from home earlier if she hadn't stayed for Jason. Beryl offered Jason to Hera's patronage, however, was the last straw that led Thalia to abandon her. Beryl's stress turned her into alcohol, and she died several years before The Lightning Thief in a car accident. Melinoë impersonates her to instill fear in Thalia in "Percy Jackson and the Sword of Hades". In The Blood of Olympus, Jason encounters her mania, who wants her son to return to her so they can be a family again, an offer that Jason rejects. She then disappears in a hiss or a sigh of relief.
- Cade and Mickey – Cade and Mickey are two thugs sent by Nero to rob Apollo, although Meg was able to easily drive them off. Cade is described as tall and red-haired, while Mickey is short and blond-haired.
- Emma and Liz – Emma and Liz are Sadie's human friends from London. They stay with Sadie in The Throne of Fire during Babi and Nekhbet's sudden attack. Sadie describes Emma as "what an Indian daughter of the singer Elton John might look like", and Liz as a "boy-crazy redhead".
- Esther – Esther is a librarian of the Jimmy Carter Library and Museum in Atlanta. She offers Percy, Frank, and Coach Hedge a ride to the Georgia Aquarium in The Mark of Athena. Hedge describes her as smelling like potpourri.
- Officer Gómez – Gómez is a Bostonian police officer. He wants to capture Magnus.
- Howard Claymore – Howard is a mortal who appears in The Son of Magic. He is a scholar and author with theories about death; he is approached for help by Alabaster who is fleeing the consequences of siding with Kronos in The Last Olympian. Claymore later sacrifices himself so Alabaster can use an incantation to destroy Lamia who is chasing him. Hecate brings him back to life in an imitative human body so that he can live on as Alabaster's protector.
- Julian Ramírez-Arellano – Julian is the father of Reyna and Hylla. Julian was a former soldier in Iraq before the birth of his eldest daughter. After he had Reyna, he started getting paranoid. He thought that his daughters were going after him and he eventually became a mania. One day, he attacked Hylla, knocking her out, and Reyna took a sword and killed what was left of him. Soon after, Reyna and Hylla then fled from San Juan, Puerto Rico.
- May Castellan – May is Luke's mother. She could see through the Mist. She went insane during a failed attempt to become the Oracle. She lives in the house where she had raised Luke, alternating between cheerful expectation that he will return home and visions of his terrible fate. In The Last Olympian, Hestia reveals to Percy that Luke's mother, May Castellan, was a mortal woman blessed with the rare ability to see through The Mist, a magic substance that keeps mortals from seeing the Gods. Because of this gift, she attempted to become the new Oracle of Delphi, but was rejected. Chiron inferred that the Spirit of Delphi rejected her because she had already given birth to a child, and the Oracle was supposed to be a virgin (in reality it was due to the Curse of Delphi placed upon the former Oracle by Hades still being active). She survived her encounter, but became mentally unstable, seeing small pieces of Luke's future.
- Maurice and Eddie – Maurice and Eddie are two employees of Kindness International Humane Animal Transport, encountered by Percy, Annabeth, and Grover in The Lightning Thief.
- Mr. and Mrs. Faust – Mr. and Mrs. Faust are Ruby Kane's parents and Carter and Sadie's maternal grandparents. They live in London. The two shun the magical world and take custody of Sadie, blaming Julius Kane for Ruby's death. They raise Sadie in an apparent normalcy but do not like her father or brother. The two are possessed by the gods Nekhbet and Babi in an attempt to test Sadie's resolve when she begins to pursue the Book of Ra. Mrs. Faust, usually called "Gran" by Sadie, is described as frail with curly gray hair, and a terrible cook. Mr. Faust "Gramps" is a large, loud former rugby player. Both have been kind to Sadie, though neither is much like Ruby.
- Maria di Angelo – Maria di Angelo was Nico and Bianca's mother and the daughter of an unnamed Italian diplomat. She died when Zeus struck the hotel she was staying in with lightning in an attempt to kill Bianca and Nico. Melinoë impersonated her to scare Nico. In The Sun and the Star, Hades arranges for a dream visit by the spirits of Maria and Bianca so that Nico can gain closure on their deaths.
- Marie Levesque – Marie Levesque was Hazel's mother. She was manipulated by Gaea into helping raise Alcyoneus. She died in 1942 along with Hazel. She was sentenced to the Fields of Punishment but Hazel made a compromise with the judges so they could both be sent to the Fields of Asphodel. In The House of Hades, Hecate reveals that she was Marie's mentor, teaching her magic.
- Mr. Dare – Mr. Dare is Rachel's father. He is the very wealthy owner of a land development company, and he first appears in The Last Olympian. Rachel hates her father because of his job. He supported Rachel and loved her very dearly going to finishing school.
- Naomi Solace – Naomi Solace is Will's mother and an American country singer. She can see through the Mist. In The Court of the Dead, Naomi gets involved in the rescue mission for the monsters who have been captured by Pirithous, Tantalus, and Mary Tudor. Naomi is revealed to share many of her son's personality traits to the point that Nico realizes that the calmer half of Will's personality comes from Apollo, not his mother.
