= Camp Half-Blood Chronicles =

Literature and media franchise by Rick Riordan

- Created by: Rick Riordan
- Original work: The Lightning Thief
- Owner: Disney
- Years: 2005–present

Print publications
- Novels: Percy Jackson & the Olympians: The Lightning Thief; The Sea of Monsters; The Titan's Curse; The Battle of the Labyrinth; The Last Olympian; The Heroes of Olympus: The Lost Hero; The Son of Neptune; The Mark of Athena; The House of Hades; The Blood of Olympus; The Senior Year Adventures (Note: Chronologically succeeds The Heroes of Olympus and precedes The Trials of Apollo and The Nico di Angelo Adventures. Officially marketed as part of the Percy Jackson & the Olympians series.): The Chalice of the Gods; Wrath of the Triple Goddess; The Trials of Apollo: The Hidden Oracle; The Dark Prophecy; The Burning Maze; The Tyrant's Tomb; The Tower of Nero; The Nico di Angelo Adventures: The Sun and the Star; The Court of the Dead
- Short stories: List: The Demigod Files; The Demigod Diaries; The Son of Sobek; The Staff of Serapis; The Crown of Ptolemy; Percy Jackson and the Singer of Apollo; Demigods of Olympus
- Graphic novels: List: The Lightning Thief graphic novel; The Sea of Monsters graphic novel; The Titan's Curse graphic novel; The Last Olympian graphic novel; The Lost Hero graphic novel; The Son of Neptune graphic novel; The Mark of Athena graphic novel; The House of Hades graphic novel

Films and television
- Films: Percy Jackson & the Olympians: The Lightning Thief; Percy Jackson: Sea of Monsters
- Television series: Percy Jackson and the Olympians

Theatrical presentations
- Musical: The Lightning Thief

Games
- Video game(s): Percy Jackson & the Olympians: The Lightning Thief

Audio
- Soundtracks: Percy Jackson & the Olympians: The Lightning Thief soundtrack Percy Jackson: Sea of Monsters soundtrack The Lighting Thief: The Percy Jackson Musical (original cast recording); Percy Jackson & the Olympians TV series soundtrack

Miscellaneous
- Related series: The Kane Chronicles; Magnus Chase and the Gods of Asgard

Camp Half-Blood Chronicles is an American media franchise created by American author Rick Riordan, encompassing four book series, two short-story collections, two myth anthology books, a stand-alone short story, three crossover short stories, an essay collection, multiple guides, nine graphic novels, two films, a live action TV series, a video game, a musical, and other media. Set in the modern world, it focuses on groups of adolescent demigod heroes and features characters from Greco-Roman mythology.

The first series, Percy Jackson & the Olympians, follows the adventures of a boy named Percy Jackson at a summer camp for Greek demigods. The second series, The Heroes of Olympus, introduces several more lead characters and a second camp for Roman demigods named Camp Jupiter in San Francisco. The third series, The Trials of Apollo, follows the now-mortal god Apollo on a quest to free the Oracles and defeat three Roman emperors to reclaim his godhood, with appearances by many characters from the first and second series. The fourth series, The Nico di Angelo Adventures, follows the adventures of a boy named Nico di Angelo and his boyfriend Will Solace, who are both Greek demigods, with appearances by many characters from the first, second, and third series.

The franchise takes place in the same fictional universe as two of Riordan's other series, The Kane Chronicles (which centers on Egyptian mythology) and Magnus Chase and the Gods of Asgard (which centers on Norse mythology). Three short stories have been published which join The Kane Chronicles and the Camp Half-Blood Chronicles; Camp Half-Blood characters have also appeared in both Magnus Chase and the Gods of Asgard and The Kane Chronicles.

== Novel series ==
=== Percy Jackson & the Olympians ===
Percy Jackson & the Olympians is a series of adventure fiction books written by Rick Riordan. Set in the United States, the books are predominantly based on Greek mythology and are about the main character, the demigod Percy Jackson, and his quest to stop the rise of the Titan lord Kronos from rising from Tartarus. The books are seen from Percy's witty and sardonic point of view. The series tackles themes like coming of age, love and teenage angst. More than 69 million copies of the books have been sold in more than 35 countries.

As of July 19, 2020, the series has been on the New York Times Best Seller list for children's book series for 538 weeks.

No.	Title	Author	Date	ISBN
1	The Lightning Thief	Rick Riordan	July 1, 2005	0-7868-5629-7
Percy Jackson, Annabeth Chase, and Grover Underwood embark on a quest to recover Zeus's stolen master bolt, which was thought to be stolen by Hades.
2	The Sea of Monsters	Rick Riordan	April 1, 2006	0-7868-5686-6
Percy, Annabeth, and Tyson, Percy's cyclops brother, go to the Bermuda Triangle, also known as the Sea of Monsters, to find the Golden Fleece to save their camp and rescue Grover from the cyclops Polyphemus.
3	The Titan's Curse	Rick Riordan	May 1, 2007	978-1-4231-0145-1
Percy, Grover, Thalia Grace, Zoë Nightshade, and Bianca di Angelo travel to San Francisco to rescue Artemis and Annabeth.
4	The Battle of the Labyrinth	Rick Riordan	May 6, 2008	9781423101468
Percy, Annabeth, Grover, Tyson, Nico di Angelo, and Rachel Elizabeth Dare are tasked with finding Daedalus in the Labyrinth so he can help them keep their camp safe against the Titan army. Percy also meets Calypso.
5	The Last Olympian	Rick Riordan	May 5, 2009	978-1-4231-0147-5
The demigods from Camp Half-Blood help defend Manhattan against Kronos and his army while the gods fight Typhon.

=== The Heroes of Olympus ===
The Heroes of Olympus is a pentalogy of books written by Riordan. It chronicles the events of seven demigods and their obstacles involving the waking of the earth goddess, Gaea, and their efforts to stop her. It picks up a year after the end of the Percy Jackson & the Olympians series. Themes include love and teenage angst, as well as dealing with homosexuality.

Riordan based some of his series on The Golden Fleece and the Heroes Who Lived Before Achilles by Padraic Colum.

No.	Title	Author	Date	ISBN
1	The Lost Hero	Rick Riordan	October 12, 2010	978-1-4231-1339-3
Jason Grace, a Roman demigod with no memory of his past, is given a quest to rescue Hera. She is captured by the primordial Earth goddess Gaea, who plans to use Hera's power to reawaken the Giant king Porphyrion. Jason is joined by Piper McLean and Leo Valdez.
2	The Son of Neptune	Rick Riordan	October 4, 2011	978-1-4231-4059-7
Percy Jackson arrives at a Roman demigod camp with almost no recollection of his past. He embarks on a quest to Alaska with Hazel Levesque and Frank Zhang to free Thanatos from the capture of the Giant Alcyoneus.
3	The Mark of Athena	Rick Riordan	October 2, 2012	978-1-4231-4060-3
Annabeth receives a message from Athena urging her to follow the Mark of Athena and avenge her. She embarks on a quest with six other demigods aboard the Argo II. They venture to Rome to search for the long-lost Athena Parthenos and confront the twin Giants Otis and Ephialtes.
4	The House of Hades	Rick Riordan	October 8, 2013	978-1-4231-4672-8
Jason Grace, Piper McLean, Leo Valdez, Hazel Levesque, Frank Zhang, and Nico di Angelo continue sailing toward Greece to rescue Percy Jackson and Annabeth Chase, both of whom have fallen to Tartarus in the previous book's epilogue. Meanwhile, Percy and Annabeth are trying to find their own way out of the hellish realm. The book also reintroduces Calypso.
5	The Blood of Olympus	Rick Riordan	October 7, 2014	978-1-4231-4673-5
The seven demigods finally reach Greece and work to defeat the giants at the Acropolis of Athens, while Reyna Ramírez-Arellano, Nico di Angelo, and Coach Gleeson Hedge deliver the Athena Parthenos back to Camp Half-Blood with the clash of the Greek and Roman camps in the horizon.

=== The Senior Year Adventures ===
Percy Jackson and the Olympians: The Senior Year Adventures is a trilogy set between the events of The Heroes of Olympus and The Trials of Apollo. It takes place during Percy's senior year as he embarks on quests to obtain recommendation letters from the gods.

No.	Title	Author	Date	ISBN
1	The Chalice of the Gods	Rick Riordan	September 26, 2023	9781368098175
Percy needs to return Ganymede's chalice in exchange for a recommendation letter.
2	Wrath of the Triple Goddess	Rick Riordan	September 24, 2024	9780241691694
Percy continues his quest for letters of recommendation for college which began in the previous novel, this time from Hecate. His quest is to pet-sit Hecate's hellhound Hecuba and polecat Gale.

=== The Trials of Apollo ===
The Trials of Apollo is a pentalogy of books written by Riordan. It chronicles the life of Apollo after his being made mortal by Zeus as a punishment for his actions during The Heroes of Olympus series. The first book, The Hidden Oracle, was released on May 3, 2016. It also features most of the characters from The Heroes of Olympus and Percy Jackson and the Olympians series.

No.	Title	Author	Date	ISBN
1	The Hidden Oracle	Rick Riordan	May 3, 2016	978-1-4847-3274-8
Zeus casts Apollo down from Mount Olympus, transforming him into a 16-year-old mortal named Lester Papadopoulos. He meets demigod Meg McCaffrey, and the two travel to Camp Half-Blood and fight monsters sent by Emperor Nero to save the Oracle of Dodona.
2	The Dark Prophecy	Rick Riordan	May 2, 2017	978-1-4847-4642-4
Apollo, Leo Valdez, and Calypso travel to find Oracle of Trophonius and prevent it from falling intoto the hands of Emperor Commodus.
3	The Burning Maze	Rick Riordan	May 1, 2018	978-1-4847-4643-1
Apollo, Meg, Grover Underwood, Piper McLean, and Jason Grace go to free the Oracle of Erythraea, who has been imprisoned by Emperor Caligula. They also stop Caligula's plan to make himself the sun god with Apollo's and Helios's essence.
4	The Tyrant's Tomb	Rick Riordan	September 24, 2019	978-1-4847-4644-8
Apollo, Meg, Hazel Levesque, Reyna Ramírez-Arellano, and Lavinia Asimov race to free the god Harpocrates and save Camp Jupiter from King Tarquin, Emperors Commodus and Caligula, and their respective armies.
5	The Tower of Nero	Rick Riordan	October 6, 2020	978-1-4847-4644-8
Apollo, Meg, Rachel Dare, Nico di Angelo, and Will Solace fight to prevent Emperor Nero from burning New York City. Apollo must also defeat his nemesis Python, who has been controlling Apollo's source of prophetic prowess in the caves of Delphi, and regain his immortality.

=== The Nico di Angelo Adventures ===
The Nico Di Angelo Adventures are a duology of books co-written by Riordan and Mark Oshiro. They feature Nico di Angelo, the demigod son of Hades first introduced in The Titan's Curse, and his boyfriend, Will Solace, the son of Apollo who first appeared in The Last Olympian as they follow an ancient prophecy into Tartarus and have to contend with the fallout of their actions. The series also features characters from The Heroes of Olympus and Percy Jackson and the Olympians series.

No.	Title	Author	Date	ISBN
1	The Sun and the Star	Rick Riordan & Mark Oshiro	May 2, 2023	9781368081153
2	The Court of the Dead	Rick Riordan & Mark Oshiro	September 23, 2025	9781368109116

=== Camp Half-Blood ===
Camp Half-Blood is an upcoming quadrilogy of novels set in the autumn between The Lightning Thief and The Sea of Monsters. It centers on four new demigods who join Camp Half-Blood, all playing an important role in the battle against the Titans. The books will release in six-month intervals; the first installment, The Wild Zone, co-written by Riordan and Annabelle Oh, released on September 29, 2026.

== Short story collections ==
=== The Demigod Files ===
The Demigod Files is a collection published by Hyperion on February 10, 2009, written entirely by Riordan. It is a companion book to the first series, Percy Jackson & the Olympians, and its main contents are four short stories: "Percy Jackson and the Stolen Chariot", "Percy Jackson and the Bronze Dragon", and "Percy Jackson and the Sword of Hades", and the first chapter of The Last Olympian (the fifth novel, published a few months later). Additional contents include interviews with some of the campers, a drawing of Annabeth's open camp trunk and a "Map of Camp Half-Blood" by Steve James, glossy color illustrations of eight characters by Antonio Caparo, and various crossword puzzles and other activities. The narrative setting is between the fourth and fifth novels.

=== The Demigod Diaries ===
The Demigod Diaries is a collection published by Hyperion on August 14, 2012, written by Rick and his son Haley Riordan. It is a companion to the second series, The Heroes of Olympus, nearly identical in structure to The Demigod Files. The main contents are four stories: "The Diary of Luke Castellan", "Percy Jackson and the Staff of Hermes", "Leo Valdez and the Quest for Buford" and, by Haley Riordan, "Son of Magic". It contains puzzles, games, black-and-white drawings by Steve James, and glossy color illustrations of characters by Antonio Caparo.

=== Percy Jackson and the Singer of Apollo ===
Percy Jackson and the Singer of Apollo is a short story appearing in the Guys Read anthology Other Worlds. It features Percy Jackson and Grover Underwood in New York City trying to recover the gold Singer of Apollo.

=== Camp Half-Blood/Kane Chronicles crossovers (Demigods and Magicians) ===
The Camp Half-Blood/Kane Chronicles crossovers are a series of short stories that feature two characters each, one from Percy Jackson & the Olympians and one from The Kane Chronicles. They were published in a collection titled Demigods and Magicians on April 5, 2016.

==== The Son of Sobek ====
The Son of Sobek is a 2013 crossover novel between the Percy Jackson and the Kane Chronicles series. It features Percy Jackson and Carter Kane fighting a giant crocodile in Long Island. It was originally published in the paperback edition of The Serpent's Shadow and was later published as an e-short.

==== The Staff of Serapis ====
The Staff of Serapis is a continuation of The Son of Sobek, published in 2014. It features Annabeth Chase and Sadie Kane battling the god Serapis in Rockaway Beach in Queens. It was originally published in the paperback edition of The Mark of Athena and was later published as an e-short.

==== The Crown of Ptolemy ====
The Crown of Ptolemy, published in 2015, features all four characters that were in the first two stories. They need to stop the evil magician Setne from collecting the Upper and Lower Crowns of Egypt and becoming a god. The short was originally published in the paperback edition of The House of Hades along with the short story Percy Jackson and the Sword of Hades. It was later published as an e-short.

=== Demigods of Olympus ===
Demigods of Olympus is an interactive e-series in which the reader is the main character. The first three stories were published in Rick Riordan's application, Demigods of Olympus and the fourth was original to a collection of all four on July 14, 2015.

- "My Two Headed Guidance Counselor"
- "The Library of Deadly Weapons"
- "My Demon Satyr Tea Party"
- "My Personal Zombie Apocalypse"

== Myth anthologies ==
=== Percy Jackson's Greek Gods ===
This book is a retelling of several mythological stories about the Greek Gods as narrated by Percy Jackson. It was released on August 19, 2014.

=== Percy Jackson's Greek Heroes ===
This book is a retelling of several mythological stories about various Greek heroes as narrated by Percy Jackson. It is the sequel to Percy Jackson's Greek Gods. It was released on August 18, 2015.

== Other books ==
=== Demigods and Monsters ===
Demigods and Monsters: Your Favorite Authors on Rick Riordan's Percy Jackson and the Olympians Series is a collection of essays "edited by Rick Riordan with Leah Wilson" and published by Borders in 2008; an expanded edition was published by BenBella Books in 2013. The second edition front cover promotes both an "original introduction by Rick Riordan" and "New Essays: Updated through The Last Olympian". Leah Wilson is editor-in-chief of the Smart Pop series in which both the paperback first edition (2009) and the second edition were issued by BenBella. (Note: Release dates January 1, 2008 (first ed.; xii+190 pp.; ISBN 0-9792331-4-3); February 10, 2009 (first, paperback in Smart Pop series; x+196 pp.; ISBN 1-933771-836); July 2, 2013 (second, expanded, in Smart Pop series; x+242 pp.; ISBN 1-937856-36-4). A banner across the tops of the front covers of the first edition reads "Completely Unauthorized" – perhaps alluding to the publisher of Percy Jackson novels (Disney) rather than the writer (Riordan).)

The essays were written by people likely to be recognized by fans of the series.

=== The Ultimate Guide ===
Percy Jackson and the Olympians: The Ultimate Guide is a guide to the world of Percy Jackson written by Mary-Jane Knight, who is not credited on the front cover. It features illustrations of characters in the series by Antonio Caparo (as trading cards in pockets) and chapters about Percy Jackson, Camp Half-Blood, and places, gods, monsters, and items from mythology. It was released by Hyperion on January 18, 2010 (156 pp; 1-4231-2171-6) and termed Book 8 in the Percy Jackson series by Amazon or the publisher. The British edition was published by Puffin Books in March as Percy Jackson: The Ultimate Guide.

=== Camp Half-Blood Confidential ===
Camp Half-Blood Confidential is a companion guide to the Trials of Apollo book series. Released on August 15, 2017, the guide follows the campers of Camp Half-Blood as they rediscover the lost Camp Half-Blood orientation video, directed and produced by the god Apollo. The book features transcripts, interviews, and a short story about the video and the campers who are watching it.

=== Camp Jupiter Classified: A Probatio's Journal ===
Camp Jupiter Classified: A Probatio's Journal is a companion book to the Trials of Apollo series. Released on May 5, 2020, the short story follows a Probatio at Camp Jupiter named Claudia as she deals with the daily duties of being a member of the Twelfth Legion of Rome. The book offers an insight at the lives of campers at Camp Jupiter and the havoc that the battle with Gaea left on the camp.

== Adaptations ==
=== Graphic novels ===
Some of the books have been adapted into graphic novels.

==== The Lightning Thief Graphic Novel ====
The Lightning Thief Graphic Novel is an adaptation of The Lightning Thief into a graphic novel. It was adapted by Robert Venditti, illustrated by Attila Futaki, and colored by José Villarrubia, and was published on October 12, 2010.

==== The Sea of Monsters Graphic Novel ====
The Sea of Monsters Graphic Novel is the graphic novel version of The Sea of Monsters. It was adapted by Robert Venditti, illustrated by Attila Futaki, and colored by Tamás Gáspár, and was published on July 2, 2013.

==== The Titan's Curse Graphic Novel ====
The Titan's Curse Graphic Novel is the graphic novel of The Titan's Curse. It was adapted by Robert Venditti, illustrated by Attila Futaki, and colored by Greg Guilhaumond, and was published on October 8, 2013.

==== The Lost Hero Graphic Novel ====
The Lost Hero Graphic Novel is the adaptation of The Lost Hero into a graphic novel. It was adapted by Robert Venditti, illustrated by Nate Powell, and colored by Orpheus Collar, and was published on October 7, 2014.

==== The Son of Neptune Graphic Novel ====
The Son of Neptune Graphic Novel is the adaptation of The Son of Neptune into a graphic novel. It was adapted by Robert Venditti, illustrated by Antoine Dod, and colored by Orpheus Collar, and was published on February 21, 2017.

==== The Mark of Athena Graphic Novel ====
The Mark of Athena Graphic Novel is the adaptation of The Mark of Athena into a graphic novel was published as of September 26, 2023.

==== The House of Hades Graphic Novel ====
The House of Hades Graphic Novel is the adaptation of The House of Hades into a graphic novel, was published as of September 24, 2024.

=== Film adaptations ===
==== Percy Jackson & the Olympians: The Lightning Thief ====
Percy Jackson & the Olympians: The Lightning Thief (also known as Percy Jackson & The Lightning Thief) is a 2010 fantasy film directed by Chris Columbus. The film is loosely based on The Lightning Thief. It stars Logan Lerman as Percy Jackson alongside an ensemble cast that includes Brandon T. Jackson, Alexandra Daddario, Jake Abel, Rosario Dawson, Steve Coogan, Uma Thurman, Catherine Keener, Kevin McKidd, Sean Bean and Pierce Brosnan. It was released to theaters on February 12, 2010. The film grossed $226,497,209 worldwide against a production budget of $95 million.

==== Percy Jackson: Sea of Monsters ====
Percy Jackson: Sea of Monsters (also known as Percy Jackson & The Sea of Monsters) is a 2013 fantasy film and the sequel to the 2010 film Percy Jackson & the Olympians: The Lightning Thief. It continues the adventures of Percy Jackson (Logan Lerman) and his friends, as they look for the golden fleece, in order to save Camp Half-Blood's magical borders from monsters. The film is based on the book The Sea of Monsters, and was released on August 7, 2013.

=== Musical theater adaptations ===
==== The Lightning Thief ====
The Lightning Thief is a two-hour-long 2017 Off-Broadway musical adaptation of the first Percy Jackson novel by Theatreworks USA. The stage play was written by Joe Tracz, with lyrics and music by Rob Rokicki, and the performance was directed by Stephen Brackett. The production had a 2019 US tour, touring 31 US cities. Following the tour, the Lighting Thief had a limited 16-week Broadway run at the Longacre Theatre and closed on January 5, 2020.

=== Video games ===
==== Percy Jackson and the Olympians: The Lightning Thief ====
The Percy Jackson video game was created by Activision for the Nintendo DS and was released on February 9, 2010. The game was based mostly on the film and featured players that were neither in the book nor the movie.

=== Television series ===
Percy Jackson and the Olympians is an American fantasy television series created by Rick Riordan and Jonathan E. Steinberg for Disney+. It stars Walker Scobell as Percy Jackson alongside an ensemble cast that includes Leah Sava Jeffries, Aryan Simhadri, Virginia Kull, Glynn Turman, Charlie Bushnell, Adam Copeland, Jason Mantzoukas, Jessica Parker Kennedy, Suzanne Cryer, Toby Stephens, Daniel Diemer, Dior Goodjohn and Lance Reddick.

The first season adapts The Lightning Thief and premiered on December 19, 2023, running for 8 episodes and concluding on January 30, 2024. The series was renewed in February 2024 for a second season, adapting The Sea of Monsters, which premiered on December 10, 2025. In March 2025, it was renewed for a third season, adapting The Titan’s Curse, set to premiere in 2026.

== See also ==
- List of characters in mythology novels by Rick Riordan
