= The Son of Neptune =

2011 novel by Rick Riordan

- First edition cover
- Author: Rick Riordan
- Cover artist: John Rocco
- Series: The Heroes of Olympus
- Release number: 2
- Genre: Children's fantasy; Action fiction; Adventure fiction; Middle grade fiction; Classical mythology; More genres: Greek mythology; Roman mythology; Children's fiction
- Publisher: Disney-Hyperion Books
- Publication date: October 4, 2011
- Publication place: United States
- Media type: Print (hardcover and paperback), audiobook, e-book
- Pages: 513 (first edition)
- ISBN: 978-1-4231-4059-7
- OCLC: 719377188
- LC Class: PZ7.R4829 Son 2011
- Preceded by: The Lost Hero
- Followed by: The Mark of Athena

The Son of Neptune is a 2011 American children's fantasy action-adventure middle grade children's fiction novel based on Greco-Roman classical mythology written by American author Rick Riordan. It is the second book in The Heroes of Olympus series, preceded by The Lost Hero and followed by The Mark of Athena. The story follows the adventures of amnesiac Percy Jackson, a demigod son of Neptune, also known as Poseidon, as he meets a camp of Roman demigods and goes to Alaska with his new friends Hazel Levesque and Frank Zhang to free the Greek god of death, Thanatos, and help save the world from Gaea, the earth goddess. The novel is narrated in the third-person, switching between the points of view of Percy, Frank, and Hazel.

The book received mostly critical acclaim, won the Goodreads Choice Award in 2011, and appeared on several bestseller lists.

The Son of Neptune was first published in hardcover on October 4, 2011, by Disney-Hyperion, with a cover designed by illustrator John Rocco. After an initial hardcover printing of three million copies, the book has since been released in paperback as well as an audiobook and e-book and translated into 37 languages.

== Development ==
In an interview by Scholastic with Vikram Sastry for The Lost Hero, Riordan was questioned about the whereabouts of Percy Jackson. The author hinted that the answer would be revealed as Jason's quest progressed. By the end of the book, he said that readers would have a good idea where the second book is going. On May 26, 2011, Riordan released both the cover art and the first chapter for The Son of Neptune confirming that Percy would play a role in the book.

On August 8, 2011, Rick Riordan released a video giving more information about the book and its characters. The video includes pictures of a black haired boy with a bow and arrow in his hands who is later revealed to be Frank Zhang, a blonde-haired boy holding a teddy bear later revealed as Octavian, a girl with black hair wearing gold armor and a purple cloak sitting on a throne flanked by a gold and a silver canine creature, both with red eyes, who was revealed on Rick Riordan's blog to be Reyna, and another girl riding a horse named Hazel Levesque. Along with this, two chapters were released prior to the book's launch: one was put on Riordan's website and another read out by Riordan on Percy's birthday, August 18.

== Plot ==
Almost a year after Percy Jackson's defense of Mount Olympus in The Last Olympian, Percy finds himself alone and on the run from monsters in northern California without his memories. With the guidance of Lupa, the wolf-goddess and protector of ancient Rome, he makes his way to Camp Jupiter, a Roman demigod training camp and counterpart to the Greek demigods' Camp Half-Blood. Upon arriving, he is attacked by Gorgons — Stheno and Euryale — and successfully defends a disguised Juno and the camp with the help of the guards on duty. Having been protected by Percy during the attack, Juno announces Percy's arrival with approval, identifying him as a son of Neptune. Nobody knows that he is actually a son of the Greek god Poseidon. She tells him privately that he can only regain his memory by learning to be a hero again and successfully surviving the challenges he encounters at camp.

Percy quickly befriends Frank Zhang, son of Mars, and Hazel Levesque, daughter of Pluto. Frank is also a distant descendant of Poseidon through his grandfather, the Argonaut Periclymenus, and has the ability to shapeshift, while Hazel has control over gems and precious metals. She died in the 1940s and was recently resurrected by her half-brother Nico di Angelo. Being outcasts themselves at Camp Jupiter, Frank and Hazel empathize with Percy's outsider status and help him adjust and acclimatize quickly to the camp's routines and leadership.

Percy is introduced to the praetor of the camp, Reyna, and the augur Octavian, who quickly takes a disliking to Percy. Octavian tells Percy that the Book of Prophecies is missing. But before any of them has a chance to gain their footing, the camp receives a prophecy from Mars, the Roman god of war, and Percy, Frank, and Hazel are ordered to go on a quest to rescue Thanatos, the god of death, from the Giant Alcyoneus, who is hiding deep in Alaska. Over the course of the adventure, Hazel reveals that she was used to raise Alcyoneus in the 1940s, but she sacrificed herself to stop him, resulting in the Giant's rise being delayed by several decades.

On their journey, they encounter Phineas, the blind human who helped Jason, leader of the Argonauts on his journey, and befriend a harpy named Ella. They also see the three Cyclopes that Jason Grace, Piper McLean, and Leo Valdez encountered in The Lost Hero. During the trip, Hazel and Frank become true heroes who know how to use their powers and have self-confidence. The trio also learns that the goddess Gaea is awakening from slumber, planning to destroy the gods and the world along with them. Her seven Giant children are being woken, and they can only be defeated if the gods and the demigods join forces. Percy and his friends manage to defeat the Alaskan Giant and save Camp Jupiter from destruction. Percy regains his memory on their return to Camp Jupiter and finds an army of monsters led by Polybotes attacking it. Percy successfully defeats Polybotes with the help of Terminus, Percy's Cyclops half-brother Tyson, and Percy's pet hellhound Mrs. O'Leary. As a reward for Percy's bravery, he is elevated to the rank of praetor, replacing the missing Jason Grace. At the end of the book, the Greek airship, Argo II arrives.

== Major characters ==
=== Viewpoint ===
- Percy Jackson: A demigod son of Poseidon (Neptune), who is the main protagonist in the first Camp Half-Blood series. He and Jason Grace have been swapped, because Hera (Juno in Roman form) has wiped their memories away to unite the two demigod camps. Percy is sent from Camp Half-Blood to Camp Jupiter, Jason's home. He goes on a quest with Frank Zhang, son of Mars, and Hazel Levesque, daughter of Pluto, to save Thanatos, Pluto's lieutenant and the deity of death. He succeeds and at the end of the book leads the Roman camp with the help of amazons into battle against Gaea's forces and is made praetor by the campers. His memories are restored at around the middle of the book, as Percy drinks gorgon's blood when he challenges Phineas, a blind seer.
- Hazel Levesque: daughter of Pluto and Nico's half-sister. She has been recently resurrected by Nico from her death in 1942 at the age of 13 and lives in Camp Jupiter. She has a crush on Frank Zhang. She is an African American demigod from New Orleans.
- Frank Zhang: a son of Mars and a legacy (distant descendant) of Poseidon on his mother's side. A notable ancestor of Frank is Periclymenus, who was given the ability of shapeshifting by his grandfather, Poseidon. It is revealed that the descendants of Periclymenus have inherited this ability, and Frank learns to use it late in the novel. Frank is a Roman demigod at Camp Jupiter, a camp for Roman demigods. Frank has a crush on Hazel, which she reciprocates. He is a Chinese Canadian.

=== Other ===
- Reyna Avila Ramirez-Arellano: daughter of Bellona, the Roman goddess of war, and praetor of Camp Jupiter. It is found that Reyna and her sister Hylla were servants of the witch Circe, whom Annabeth and Percy had killed in The Sea of Monsters. Reyna goes on to Camp Jupiter, and Hylla goes to the Amazons, where she later becomes queen.
- Nico Di Angelo: half brother of Hazel Levesque. Son of Pluto (Hades) the god of death and riches. He lost his real sister when he was 10. He was originally a happy boy, but after this he became melancholic. After a while, he lived in the Underworld, which caused him to become dark, pale, and scary.

== Release ==
The Son of Neptune was given a first printing of three million copies, the largest for Disney-Hyperion to that point. Upon release, the book ranked No. 1 on The New York Times bestseller list, USA Today bestseller list, and The Wall Street Journal bestseller list. It was the Amazon Best Book of the Month in October 2011.

=== Critical reception ===
The novel was met with mostly positive reviews. Dana Henderson of the Seattle Post-Intelligencer called the addition of new characters "refreshing and captivating" and claimed that it would "make the reader to want to keep reading". Kimberly Bennion in Deseret News cited it as an "emotional roller coaster" and would please both old and new fans. However, she thought the characters had flaws. The Hutchinson Leader's Kay Johnson wrote that the plot was confusing and the first half was not engaging, but thought Riordan should be given credit for introducing Greek and Roman mythology to a new generation. Kirkus Reviews was positive about the book, thinking that Riordan had "regained his traction" after "spinning his wheels" in The Lost Hero.

== Sequels ==
The third book in the series, entitled The Mark of Athena, was released on October 2, 2012, and The House of Hades was released on October 8, 2013. The final installment of the series, entitled The Blood of Olympus, was released on October 7, 2014.
