= Percy Jackson's Greek Gods =

Collection of short stories by Rick Riordan

- Cover of U.S. edition with Rocco artwork
- Author: Rick Riordan
- Illustrator: John Rocco
- Cover artist: John Rocco (US), Steve Stone (UK)
- Series: Percy Jackson & the Olympians (companion)
- Genre: Young adult short story collection, Greek mythology
- Publisher: Disney Hyperion; Penguin Group (UK)
- Publication date: August 19, 2014; August 7, 2014 (UK)
- Publication place: United States
- Media type: Print (hardcover), e-book
- Pages: 318 to 336 (US, first ed. variously counted); 402 pp (UK)
- ISBN: 978-1423183648
- LC Class: PS3568.I5866 P47 2014
- Followed by: Percy Jackson's Greek Heroes

Percy Jackson's Greek Gods is a collection of short stories about Greek mythology as narrated by Percy Jackson. It was written by Rick Riordan and was released on August 19, 2014. It features Percy Jackson giving his own take on the Greek myths in a humorous way.

The book is titled Percy Jackson and the Greek Gods in the U.K. and much of the Commonwealth of Nations. It is generally published under the Puffin Books imprint of Penguin Group and may be presented as Percy Jackson and the Olympians, volume 6. (The Olympians novels are commonly titled Percy Jackson and the Lightning Thief rather than The Lightning Thief, and so on.)

== Development ==
On April 21, 2013, Rick Riordan announced on his Twitter account that he was writing a new book based on the stories of Greek mythology from Percy Jackson's point of view. He later confirmed this in his blog. While on tour for The House of Hades Rick Riordan also revealed that the book is 450 pages long, with illustrations throughout. It was released on August 19, 2014. John Rocco, the illustrator of the book, announced that there will be 60 full-color paintings drawn by him in the book, and gave a sneak peek of one, depicting Hades kidnapping Persephone.

During the Blood of Olympus tour, Rick Riordan announced a sequel, titled Percy Jackson's Greek Heroes, to be released on August 18, 2015.

== Plot ==
Percy Jackson adds his own viewpoint to the Greek myths. Here he presents an introduction to Greek mythology and the 12 major gods and goddesses. With 19 chapters, this includes a variety of stories, from the early tales of Gaea and the Titans to individual tales about the gods readers encountered in the Camp Half-Blood chronicles. Percy's irreverent voice is evident from titles such as "Hera Gets a Little Cuckoo," "Zeus Kills Everyone," "Athena Adopts a Handkerchief," and "Artemis Unleashes the Death Pig," and the stories are told in his voice with his distinctive, sarcastic yet humorous perspective.
