= The Lightning Thief =

2005 novel by Rick Riordan

- First edition cover (2005)
- Author: Rick Riordan
- Cover artist: Peter Bollinger; John Rocco (later edition matching the sequels)
- Series: Percy Jackson & the Olympians
- Release number: 1
- Genre: Children's fantasy; Action fiction; Adventure fiction; Middle grade fiction; Greek mythology; Children's fiction
- Publisher: Miramax Books; Puffin Books, Disney-Hyperion
- Publication date: July 1, 2005 (hardcover); April 1, 2006 (paperback)
- Publication place: United States
- Media type: Print (hardcover), audiobook CD
- Pages: 377
- ISBN: 0-7868-5629-7
- OCLC: 60786141
- LC Class: PZ7.R4829 Li 2005
- Followed by: The Sea of Monsters

The Lightning Thief is a 2005 American children's fantasy novel based on Greek mythology written by American author Rick Riordan. The first children's novel by Riordan and the opening installment in Percy Jackson & the Olympians series, the book was recognized among the year's best for children. Riordan followed the novel with various books and spin-off series, spawning the Camp Half-Blood Chronicles media franchise.

A film adaptation of the book was theatrically released in the United States by 20th Century Fox on February 12, 2010. The Disney+ series Percy Jackson and the Olympians adapted The Lightning Thief in its first season, which ran from December 19, 2023, to January 30, 2024.

== Plot ==
Percy Jackson is a 12-year-old boy with dyslexia and ADHD living in New York City, with his mother Sally Jackson, and his abusive stepfather Gabe Ugliano. On a school trip to the Metropolitan Museum of Art, one of the chaperones, Mrs. Dodds, turns into a Fury and attacks him. Percy's favorite teacher, Mr. Brunner, later revealed as Chiron, lends Percy a magical sword-pen to defeat her. After the school year ends, Sally takes him to Long Island. Percy's friend from school, Grover, reveals himself as a satyr and warns of danger to come, advising Sally to take Percy to a summer camp named Camp Half-Blood. On the way, the Minotaur attacks the group, causing Sally to disappear in a flash of light. Percy kills the beast with one of its horns.

At camp, Percy learns that he is a demigod—the son of a human and a Greek god. He settles into camp life and meets several other demigods like him, including Luke, Clarisse, and Annabeth. After a hellhound attacks him during a game of Capture the Flag, he is saved by Chiron and then claimed by his father, the god Poseidon. Chiron explains to Percy how the three eldest male gods—Poseidon, Zeus, and Hades—swore an oath not to have children; Percy's birth was a violation of the oath.

Percy is sent on a quest to locate Zeus' Master Bolt before June 21st or a war will break out between Zeus and Poseidon that will destroy the world. Annabeth and Grover accompany him to the realm of Hades, who is believed to be the possible culprit. Percy brings Chiron's magic sword, Anaklusmos, and Luke's flying sneakers. The trio travels to Los Angeles to visit Hades. Along the way, they are attacked by the Furies, Medusa, Echidna, and the Chimera. They perform a favor for the god Ares (finding his shield at the tunnel of love, which turns out to be a trap by Hephaestus), who gives them a backpack full of supplies and safe transportation to Nevada, where they are stalled by the Lotus-eaters. In Hades's realm, Grover is nearly dragged into Tartarus by Luke's flying shoes. The battered group finally meets Hades, who reveals that his Helm of Darkness has also been mysteriously stolen and accuses Percy of stealing it. Hades threatens to kill Percy's mother, and unleash a zombie apocalypse unless his Helm is returned. When Percy finds the missing Master Bolt inside Ares's backpack, the group realizes Ares has manipulated them. After they narrowly escape the Underworld, the group meets Ares again on Santa Monica beach and Percy challenges him to a duel. After an arduous fight, Percy wins, and he gives the Helm of Darkness to the Furies. Hades realizes that Percy is not the thief of the Helm nor the Master Bolt and returns Sally home.

Percy takes a plane to the Empire State Building, the home of Mount Olympus, and gives the Master Bolt back to Zeus and meets his father, Poseidon. Percy returns to Camp Half-Blood as a hero and enjoys the rest of his summer. On the last day of camp, he enters the woods with Luke, who reveals himself as the real thief of Hades's Helm and Zeus's Bolt, following Kronos's orders. Kronos had also manipulated the power-hungry Ares into participating in the scheme. Luke explains that the gods are irresponsible, poor leaders who should be overthrown. He offers Percy the chance to join him, and when Percy refuses, Luke tries to kill him with a scorpion. Percy is stung, but manages to kill it before he passes out.

When Percy wakes up, he is given the choice of staying in camp or going home for the school year. He decides to spend the school year with his mother. Grover and Annabeth also leave the camp.

== Development and publication ==
Development for The Lightning Thief began when author Rick Riordan made up stories for his son Haley, who had been diagnosed with ADHD and dyslexia. His son had been studying Greek mythology in second grade and asked that his father come up with bedtime stories based on Greek myths. Riordan had been a Greek mythology teacher at a middle school for many years and was able to remember enough stories to please his son. Soon Riordan ran out of myths and his son requested that Riordan make new ones using the characters from Greek myths with a new twist. Riordan created the fictional character Percy Jackson and his travels across the United States to recover Zeus' lightning bolt. In his new story, Riordan made ADHD and dyslexia part of a demigod's powers—respectively, heightened battle reflexes and a brain wired to read ancient Greek rather than English. After Riordan finished telling the story his son asked that his dad write a book based on Percy's adventures, and he did.

While he gave his manuscript to his agent and editor to review, Riordan took his book to a group of middle schoolers to critique. With their help, he came up with the name of the book and invented Percy's magic sword. Riordan first sent out the manuscript for The Lightning Thief under a pseudonym, as he did not want to rely on anyone in the publishing industry who would have known him through his previous work. After many rejections, an agent picked up the manuscript as she liked its premise. In 2004 the book was sold to Miramax Books for enough money that Riordan could quit his job to focus on writing. The book has since been released in multiple versions (including hardcover, paperback, and audio editions) and has been translated and published all over the world. A deluxe version with illustration was released on January 30, 2024.

== Critical reception ==
The Lightning Thief received mostly positive reviews. Common Sense Media said, "There are two levels of fun in The Lightning Thief. One is the fast-paced quest of a young hero and his friends to save the world..." and added, "Another level of fun here – laughing at the wicked ways the author has updated the gods and monsters for the 21st century". However, it did criticize some aspects of the book, describing the prose as "choppy and attitude-filled" and complaining that "[t]he characters aren't emotionally involving". Its overall rating was 4 stars out of 5. Numerous other reviews were more positive. The New York Times praised The Lightning Thief as "perfectly paced, with electrifying moments chasing each other like heartbeats". School Library Journal said in its starred review that the book was "[a]n adventure-quest with a hip edge" and that "[r]eaders will be eager to follow the young protagonist's next move". Kirkus Reviews reviews said, "The sardonic tone of the narrator's voice lends a refreshing air of realism to this riotously paced quest tale of heroism that questions the realities of our world, family, friendship and loyalty." Eoin Colfer, author of Artemis Fowl called it "A fantastic blend of myth and modern". Finally, Publishers Weekly also praised the book, regarding it as "swift and humorous" and added that the book would "leave many readers eager for the next installment."

On April 8, 2007, The Lightning Thief was ranked ninth on The New York Times Best Seller list for children's books. The Lightning Thief was the winner of the School Library Journal Best Book of 2005 as well as one of the books in the Chicago Public Library Best of the Best Books List, 2005. It was also in the VOYA Top Shelf Fiction List and was the winner of the Red House Children's Book Award Winner (UK), 2006; Askews Torchlight Award (UK), 2006; and the Mark Twain Award (Missouri Association of School Librarians), 2008. It was an American Library Association Notable Book, 2006 and a New York Times Notable Book (2005). It received the Young Reader's Choice Award in 2008 and the Rebecca Caudill Young Reader's Book Award in 2009. Scholastic Parent & Child magazine also included the novel within its 100 "Greatest Books for Kids." When asked about the various awards, Rick Riordan said: "The ultimate compliment for a children's writer is when the kids like it."

== Adaptations ==
=== Film adaptation ===
In June 2004, 20th Century Fox acquired the feature film rights to the book. In April 2007, director Chris Columbus was hired to helm the project. The film, titled Percy Jackson & the Olympians: The Lightning Thief, was released in the United States on February 12, 2010, and stars Logan Lerman as Percy Jackson, Alexandra Daddario as Annabeth Chase, Brandon T. Jackson as Grover, and Pierce Brosnan as Chiron. The film received mixed reviews from critics upon release and grossed $226 million at the worldwide box office. Riordan criticized the movie for significantly altering the book's story, attempting to appeal to an older audience at the expense of the book's younger target demographic, making changes that would create problems for possible sequel films, and generally being poorly written. A sequel, Percy Jackson: Sea of Monsters, was released in 2013.

=== Audiobook ===
On June 28, 2005, a 10-hour and 25 minute audio book version, read by actor Jesse Bernstein, was published worldwide by Listening Library.

Kirkus Reviews magazine said, "the narrator's voice lends a refreshing air of realism to this riotously paced quest tale of heroism that questions the realities of our world, family, friendship and loyalty". AudioFile Magazine praised the audiobook, "adults and children alike will be spellbound as they listen to this deeply imaginative tale unfold." School Library Journal both praised and criticized the audio book saying "Although some of Jesse Bernstein's accents fail (the monster from Georgia, for instance, has no Southern trace in her voice), he does a fine job of keeping the main character's tones and accents distinguishable".

=== Graphic novel ===
The Lightning Thief was published as a graphic novel on October 12, 2010. It consists of 128 pages with cover art by Attila Futaki and Jose Villarrubia.

=== Musical ===
A one-hour musical aimed at young audiences was planned to hit the road on a nationwide tour in September 2014 following a stint in New York City in 2014. A two-hour version of the musical previewed Off-Broadway on March 23, 2017, at the Lucille Lortel Theatre. It officially opened on April 4, 2017, and ran until May 6 of the same year. On June 20, a cast recording was released on the Broadway Records label. In August 2017, it was announced that the two-hour long production would be going on a national tour beginning in the fall of 2018. In 2019 it was announced that the production would make its Broadway debut at the Longacre Theatre, running from September 2019 until January 2020.

=== Television adaptation ===
On May 14, 2020, Riordan announced that there would be a live-action Percy Jackson & the Olympians series made for Disney+. Unlike the earlier film adaptation, the series would follow the storyline of the books, and Riordan and his wife Becky would be involved in "every aspect of the show". The first season of the show would adapt the story of The Lightning Thief. On July 13, 2021, Riordan announced Jon Steinberg and Dan Shotz as the show's showrunners, and on January 25, 2022, the show was officially green-lit by Disney+. On April 11, 2022, Walker Scobell was announced to be playing Percy Jackson. In May 2022, Leah Sava Jeffries and Aryan Simhadri joined the cast, respectively playing Annabeth Chase and Grover Underwood. Principal photography began on June 2, 2022, and concluded on February 2, 2023. Percy Jackson and the Olympians premiered on December 19, 2023, on Disney+, with the first season consisting of eight episodes. The series received positive reviews from critics, who largely praised its faithfulness to the source material.

== Sequels ==
The Lightning Thief is followed by The Sea of Monsters, in which Percy and Annabeth rescue Grover, who has been taken by Polyphemus the Cyclops, and recover the Golden Fleece to save the camp. They are accompanied in this mission by Percy's Cyclops half brother, Tyson, and by Clarisse La Rue.

Like The Lightning Thief, it won several prizes and received generally positive reviews as well. It sold over 100,000 copies in paperback. It was followed by The Titan's Curse, The Battle of the Labyrinth, The Last Olympian, and the Senior Year Adventure books The Chalice of the Gods and Wrath of the Triple Goddess. Series that follow are The Heroes of Olympus and The Trials of Apollo.
