= Katie Kim =

Katie Kim may refer to:

- Katie Kim (Irish musician) (born 1983), Irish musician
- Katie Kim (South Korean singer) (born 1993), South Korean singer
- Katie Kim, a character in Camp Half-Blood
