= Catoblepas =

Legendary creature, buffalo whose head always looks downward

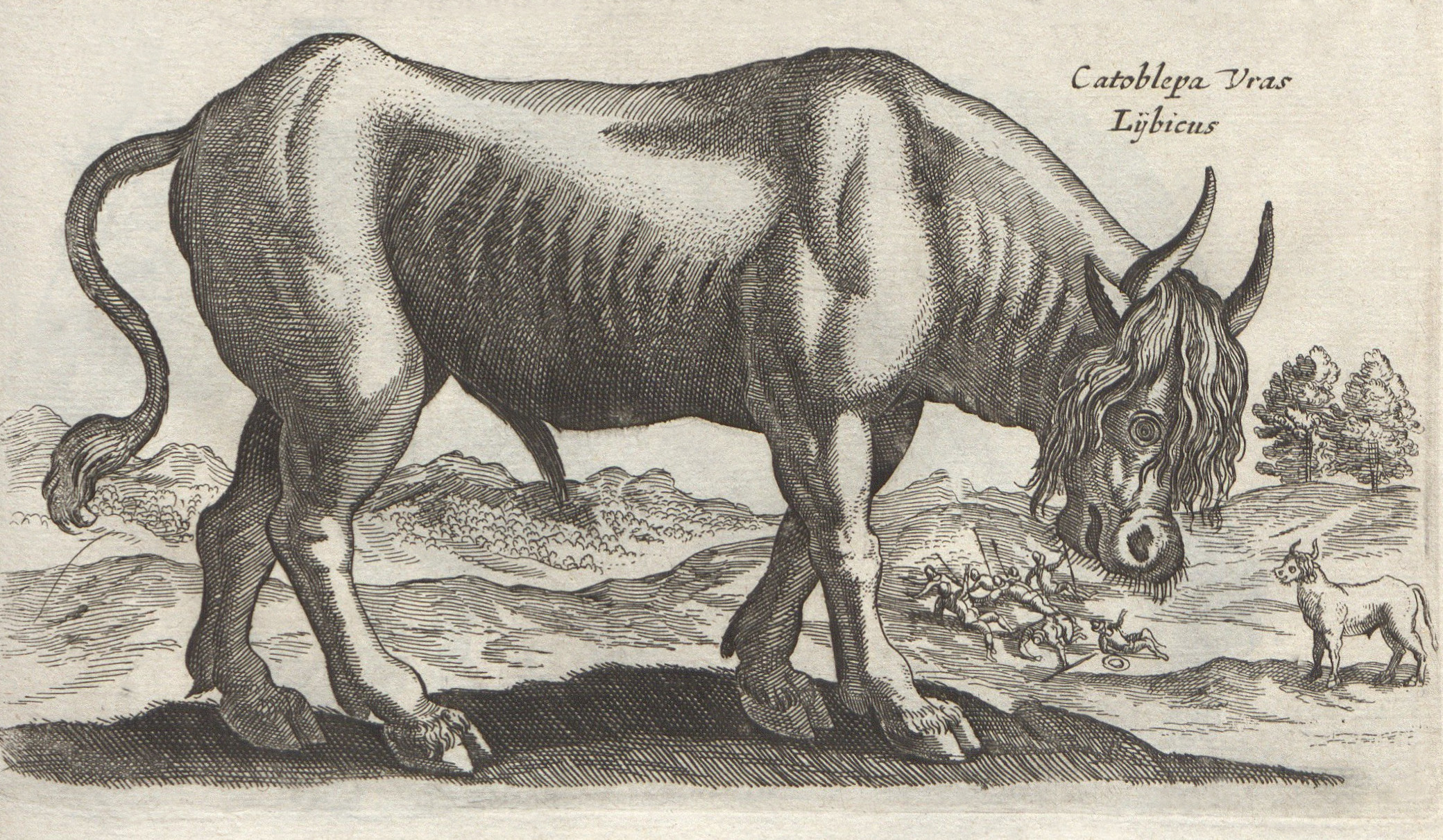
The Catoblepas as depicted by Jan Jonston, Historia naturalis de quadrupedibus, Amsterdam, 1657

The catoblepas (from Latin catōblepas, ultimately from Greek καταβλέπω (katablépō) "to look downwards") is a legendary creature from Aethiopia, first described by Pliny the Elder and later by Claudius Aelianus.

One known description of the Catoblepas is said to resemble a cape buffalo, with its head always pointing downwards due to its great weight. Its stare or breath could kill people. The catoblepas is often thought to be based on real-life encounters with wildebeest, such that some dictionaries say that the word is synonymous with "gnu". Other depictions have it sporting the head of a hog and the body of a cape buffalo. It is sometimes known as an African version of a Gorgon.

== Ancient and medieval descriptions ==
Pliny the Elder (Natural History, 8.32) described the catoblepas as a mid-sized creature, sluggish, with a heavy head and a face always turned to the ground. He thought its gaze, like that of the basilisk, was lethal, making the heaviness of its head quite fortunate.

Pomponius Mela (Chorographia, 3.98) gives a similar description given by Pliny the Elder though also notes that the creature is fairly passive and not known to physically attack others.

Timotheus of Gaza (On Animals, 53) says that the catoblepas emits fire from its nostrils.

Claudius Aelianus (On the Nature of Animals, 7.6) provided a fuller description: the creature was a mid-sized herbivore, about the size of a domestic bull, with a heavy mane, narrow, bloodshot eyes, a scaly back and shaggy eyebrows. The head was so heavy that the beast could only look down. In his description, the animal's gaze was not lethal, but its breath was poison, since it ate only poisonous vegetation.

Constantine Manasses (2, 39) mentions the "fire-breathing katobleps".

== In literature ==
The catoblepas is described in The Notebooks of Leonardo da Vinci:

It is found in Ethiopia near to the source Nigricapo. It is not a very large animal, is sluggish in all its parts, and its head is so large that it carries it with difficulty, in such wise that it always droops towards the ground; otherwise it would be a great pest to man, for any one on whom it fixes its eyes dies immediately.

In The Temptation of Saint Anthony (1874), Gustave Flaubert describes it as:

... a black buffalo with the head of a hog, hanging close to the ground, joined to its body by a thin neck, long and loose as an emptied intestine. It wallows flat upon the ground, and its legs are smothered under the huge mane of stiff bristles that hide its face.

In The Countess of Pembroke's Arcadia (The New Arcadia) (c. 1570–1586), by Sir Philip Sidney, the "forsaken knight" that Amphilalus fights has a Catoblepas upon his crest:

So passed he over into the island, taking with him the two brothers of Anaxius; where he found the forsaken knight attired in his own livery, as black as sorrow itself could see itself in the blackest glass: his ornaments of the same hue, but formd into the figures of ravens which seemed to gape for carrion: only his reins were snakes, which finely wrapping themselves one within the other, their heads came together to the cheeks and bosses of the bit, where they might seem to bite at the horse, and the horse, as he champed the bit, to bite at them, and that the white foam was engendered by the poisonous fury of the combat. His impresa was a Catoblepta, which so long lies dead as the moon (whereto it hath so natural a sympathy) wants her light. The word signified, that the moon wanted not the light, but the poor beast wanted the moon's light.

The Catoblepas was listed in the Book of Imaginary Beings (1957) by Jorge Luis Borges. It is described as a black buffalo with a hog's head that is always looking down.

A catoblepas appears in A Spell for Chameleon (1977) by Piers Anthony. In the book, the catoblepas fights an argus and a harpy, all of which want to devour the protagonist, Bink. It is described as follows:

[Bink] sat up. One leg remained anchored-but now he had anchorage to rip out of the clutch of the demon weed. It didn't even hurt this time. He looked at the battling monsters-and saw the snakelike hair of the catoblepas twined around the head of the argus, gripping it by horns, ears, scales, and eyeballs-anything available. The body of the catoblepas was covered with reptilian scales, from its gorgon head to its cloven hooves, invulnerable to the attack of the argus. In overall shape it was like any quadruped, not all that remarkable; but that deadly writhing prehensile head hair-what a horror!

The catoblepas is mentioned in The Shattered World (1984) by Michael Reaves:

Troas cleared his throat impatiently and Beorn looked at him. On his robe was a stylized design of a catoblepas, stitched in silver thread in a rampant pose. Beorn thought it looked faintly ridiculous.

In Rick Riordan's 2013 The Heroes of Olympus book The House of Hades, the catoblepas appears with the name Katobleps (Ancient Greek κατῶβλεψ) in the form of creatures resembling cow monsters. They are shown to have a poisonous gaze and a poisonous breath.

== In other media ==
- The Catoblepas appeared in the roleplaying game Dungeons & Dragons in two distinct forms. It first appeared under the name "Catoblepas" in 1976, in the TSR-published magazine The Strategic Review, issue #7 and continued to appear in various editions of the game rules with evolving attributes. TSR also included a creature in its game called the gorgon based on the catoblepas of legend, but resembling iron-scaled cattle. This interpretation of gorgon appears as a unit in Heroes of Might and Magic III as well.
- The catoblepas appears as creature cards in the Theros and Theros Beyond Death expansion sets of the collectible card game Magic: The Gathering.
- The catoblepas appears as a common enemy in the Castlevania video games. Its description varies in different games where it can resemble a gray ox and an armored bull. The catoblepas has a weaker counterpart called the gorgon which can breathe poison.
- An invalid binomial name for the Black wildebeest is Catoblepas operculatus as coined by Brookes (1828), likely in reference to both its horns and downturned head.
- The Catoblepas inspired several Monster Cards in the collectible card game Yu-Gi-Oh!.
- The Catoblepas appears in RuneScape with the name "Catablepon".
- Catoblepas meat is mentioned as preferred food of a spoiled princess in The Witcher video game.
- The catoblepas appears as a common enemy in the Final Fantasy video game series.
- Catoblepas is used as the namesake for a magic spell in the Black Clover manga and anime franchise, taking the form of an evil eye eyeball spell.
