= The Mark of Athena =

2012 novel by Rick Riordan

- First edition cover
- Author: Rick Riordan
- Cover artist: John Rocco
- Language: English
- Series: The Heroes of Olympus
- Release number: 3
- Genre: Children's fantasy; Action fiction; Adventure fiction; Middle grade fiction; Classical mythology; More genres: Greek mythology; Roman mythology; Children's fiction
- Publisher: Disney-Hyperion Books
- Publication date: October 2, 2012
- Publication place: United States
- Media type: Print (hardcover and paperback), audiobook, e-book
- Pages: 586 (first ed., hardcover)
- ISBN: 978-1-4231-4060-3
- OCLC: 785897707
- LC Class: PZ7.R4829 Mar 2012
- Preceded by: The Son of Neptune
- Followed by: The House of Hades

The Mark of Athena is a 2012 American children's fantasy action-adventure middle grade children's fiction novel based on Greco-Roman classical mythology written by American author Rick Riordan. It was published on October 2, 2012, and is the third book in The Heroes of Olympus series, a sequel to the Percy Jackson & the Olympians series. It is preceded by The Son of Neptune and followed by The House of Hades. The novel is narrated in the third-person.

The Mark of Athena received positive reviews from critics for its humor, characters, and mix of elements. Criticism was focused on its slow pace, action, and different perspectives. It has since been translated into many languages and released as a hardcover, e-book, audiobook, and paperback.

== Plot ==
Six months after the events of The Lost Hero, Leo Valdez has constructed a flying trireme named Argo II, first to fly to camp Jupiter, later for use in the quest to Greece and Rome to stop Gaea from awakening. Leo Valdez, Jason Grace, Piper McLean, and Annabeth Chase, accompanied by Coach Hedge, arrive at Camp Jupiter to rendezvous with Percy Jackson and Roman demigods Frank Zhang and Hazel Levesque. Camp Jupiter's praetor Reyna Avila Ramírez-Arellano tells Annabeth that, in order to unite Greek and Roman demigods against Gaea, they have to retrieve the Athena Parthenos, a giant statue of Athena that was stolen by the Romans from the Greeks in ancient times. The statue can only be retrieved by the demigod children of Athena through the help of the Mark of Athena, and no one has succeeded. Their conversation is interrupted by an Eidolon, who possesses Leo and forces him to attack the Roman camp. This causes the paranoid augur, Octavian, to convince the Romans that the Greeks are a threat and have to be destroyed.

The seven demigods escape Camp Jupiter and briefly land near the Great Salt Lake. While there, Leo meets Nemesis, who gives him a fortune cookie that will help him if he breaks it, though doing so has consequences. Then, the group heads to Kansas, where Percy, Jason, and Piper disembark to find Bacchus, who tells them that they should find Phorcys. Gaea sends Eidolons to possess Percy and Jason in Kansas but they are repelled by Piper's charmspeak. When the demigods meet Phorcys and his sister, Keto, at the Georgia Aquarium, they turn out to be hostile, and the demigods are forced to battle them. Throughout the journey, tensions rise between Hazel, Frank, and Leo, especially when Leo discovers that Hazel's previous boyfriend was Leo's identical-looking great-grandfather Sammy Valdez. The group also learn that Nico di Angelo, who has been captured by the Giants during his travel to find the Doors of Death, is dying and must be saved. While searching for the Mark of Athena at Fort Sumter in Charleston, the demigods are ambushed by the Romans, but Reyna decides to let Annabeth continue her search for the Athena Parthenos, telling her that their next encounter will not be friendly. Annabeth finds a map about the mark of Athena, and returns to the ship.

While crossing the Atlantic Ocean, the Argo II is attacked by the Scolopendra, one of Keto's children, and Leo, Frank, and Hazel are briefly sent underwater to Chiron's brother, the Ichthyocentaurs. While traveling to Rome, they dodge Hercules at the Strait of Gibraltar and sail through the Mediterranean Sea, confronting Chrysaor along the way. There, the group splits up: Hedge guards the ship; Percy, Jason, and Piper scout the Colosseum; Frank, Hazel, and Leo search for Nico; and Annabeth looks for the Athena Parthenos. Percy and Jason defeat Ephialtes and Otis, the twin Giants who captured Nico, with the help of Bacchus. Frank, Hazel, and Leo are trapped by the Eidolons underground, but Leo uses his fortune cookie to bail them out. Annabeth, meanwhile, faces a variety of challenges, eventually confronting Arachne and defeats her using trickery, pushing her into Tartarus. The demigods secure the Athena Parthenos and save Nico; however, Arachne uses her remaining silk and pulls Annabeth and Percy into Tartarus; Percy hanging on the edge, asks Nico to meet them at the other side of the Doors of Death and falls into the abyss. Leo realizes that Percy and Annabeth's fall are the "consequences" mentioned by Nemesis and feels personally responsible. All the remaining members set sail for Greece.

== Characters ==
- Annabeth Chase – daughter of Athena (known as Minerva to the Romans). She is tasked with recovering the Athena Parthenos, which will be instrumental in uniting the Greeks and Romans. She is the girlfriend of Percy.
- Leo Valdez – son of Hephaestus (known as Vulcan to the Romans). He is briefly possessed by an eidolon in the book, and feels personally responsible for Annabeth and Percy falling into Tartarus.
- Piper McLean – daughter of Aphrodite (known as Venus to the Romans). She is the girlfriend of Jason. Piper has the gift of charmspeak.
- Percy Jackson – son of Poseidon (known as Neptune to the Romans) who recently recovered from amnesia and was formerly praetor in Camp Jupiter. He is the boyfriend of Annabeth.
- Jason Grace – son of Jupiter (known as Zeus to the Greek). He is the praetor of Camp Jupiter, who recently recovered from amnesia after Hera stole his memory. He is the boyfriend of Piper.
- Hazel Levesque – daughter of Pluto (known as Hades to the Greek). She recently returned from the dead. She is the girlfriend of Frank.
- Frank Zhang – son of Mars (known as Ares to the Greek) and legacy of Poseidon. He is the boyfriend of Hazel. He briefly has tensions with Leo over Hazel.
- Coach Gleeson Hedge – satyr keeper of Camp Half-Blood. Hedge functions as the chaperone on board the Argo II.
- Nico di Angelo – son of Hades. He jumps into Tartarus to close the Doors of Death, but is captured by Ephialtes and Otis.

== Composition and marketing ==
Rick Riordan had been working on The Mark of Athena since the completion of The Son of Neptune. He collaborated with John Rocco for creating the book's cover.

During his tour to promote the last book of The Kane Chronicles, titled The Serpent's Shadow, Riordan read part of the first chapter of The Mark of Athena. The cover and full first chapter were also released on Disney's The Heroes of Olympus website. On September 27, 2012, Riordan confirmed that there would be a first US printing of 3.5 million copies.

== Release ==
The Mark of Athena was released on October 2, 2012. Since then, it has been translated into many languages and released as a hardcover, e-book, audiobook and paperback and is available in those formats. During its first week, The Mark of Athena sold about 237,000 copies.

== Reception ==
The Mark of Athena received positive reviews from critics. Carrie R. Wheadon of Common Sense Media rated the novel 4/5 and commented, "Holding a fast-paced fantasy-quest-adventure together with seven different heroes that deserve almost equal weight has the potential to really weigh the story down", adding, "sometimes the action stops and readers will want to get back to their old pal Percy again". However, she finds that "overall, every hero takes a turn at being awesome." Karen Rought of Hypable applauded Riordan for his "trademark humor", noting that his "clever lines" are "new, improved, and back with a vengeance". She appreciated the balance in the book, commenting that "[t]he funny moments weigh equally with the emotional bits" while noting it "slows down periodically to take note of everyone's situation".

Kirkus Reviews felt that the pace initially drags, during which the demigods resolve their relationships and attempt to solve both the prophecy and nightmare visions, while positively noting that the pace picks up mid-way and elements of humor begin to appear. They opine that much of the tension present in earlier books is missing. Kirkus concludes their review by writing, "Here, Riordan's infectious love for his subject matter really comes through, even as he takes some real risks with his characters." Conversely, The Horn Book Magazine observed, "Riordan's likable, strong, distinct characters drive the narrative in this rousing continuation of the saga." Zach Dalzell of Scholastic writes that the novel is filled with "fascinating mythology, a bold sense of adventure, and intriguing love stories all tinged with Riordan's signature demigod humor", adding, "Mark of Athena doesn't disappoint as the Legend of Percy Jackson sails on."

Few reviewers, including Meann Ortiz of GMA Network, criticized the multiple perspective format of the novel. Ortiz felt the different perspectives were tiresome and noted that the plot was very similar to that of previous books, saying it was a "testament to Riordan's skills that the books never end up being too boring and predictable." He also noted "girlfriend" and "boyfriend" were "bandied around more times than necessary to establish who is with whom". However, he found it interesting to watch the characters grow up in another installment of the series and praised the cliffhanger ending. A reviewer from The Guardian was less troubled, calling this "the best in the series so far" and praising its "funny bits", but concurred with Ortiz on the perspective format, which they felt was lopsided in favor of Annabeth, Percy and Jason. In contrast, Benjamin Boche of KidsReads enjoyed having multiple narrators, writing, "Each one brings a breath of fresh air to whatever is happening and their unique perspectives keep things interesting." He adds, "There are many characters to juggle, but everyone has an important role and all their actions and storylines fit together seamlessly."

Rebecca Fisher of Fantasy Literature rated it 3.5/5, writing, "Though it suffers a little from middle book syndrome, with nothing started and nothing finished, Riordan makes sure that Annabeth's quest remains the key focus of the book, letting it drive the course of the otherwise sprawling narrative." While observing the narrative "can get a bit cluttered at times", Fisher appreciated "his [Riordan's] droll sense of writing style" and "contemporary updates on Greek and Roman mythology." Booklist similarly appreciated the mix of various elements, opining, "Throughout the novel, the juxtaposition of humor and terror makes both aspects of the writing more vivid."

== Sequel ==
The following book of the series, The House of Hades, was released on October 8, 2013.
