= The Sea of Monsters =

2006 novel by Rick Riordan

- Cover of unknown later US edition with Rocco illustration (same as first ed.)
- Author: Rick Riordan
- Cover artist: John Rocco (depicted)
- Series: Percy Jackson & the Olympians
- Release number: 2
- Genre: Children's fantasy; Action fiction; Adventure fiction; Middle grade fiction; Greek mythology; Children's fiction
- Published: April 1, 2006
- Publisher: Miramax Books and Disney Hyperion
- Publication place: United States
- Media type: Print (hardcover and paperback), audiobook, e-book
- Pages: 279
- ISBN: 0-7868-5686-6
- OCLC: 64664383
- LC Class: MLCS 2006/45756 (P)
- Preceded by: The Lightning Thief
- Followed by: The Titan's Curse

The Sea of Monsters is a 2006 children's novel based on Greek mythology by the American author Rick Riordan. It is the second novel in the Percy Jackson & the Olympians series and the sequel to The Lightning Thief. This book chronicles the adventures of thirteen-year-old demigod Percy Jackson as he and his friends rescue his satyr friend Grover from the Cyclops Polyphemus and save Camp Half-Blood from a Titan's attack by bringing the Golden Fleece to cure Thalia's poisoned pine tree.

The Sea of Monsters was released on April 1, 2006, by Miramax Books, an imprint of Hyperion Books for Children, and thus Disney Publishing (succeeded by the Disney Hyperion imprint). It was generally well–received and was nominated for numerous awards, including the 2006 Book Sense Top Ten Summer Pick and the 2009 Mark Twain Award. It sold over 100,000 copies in paperback with over one million copies total and was released in audiobook format on September 6, 2006. The Sea of Monsters is followed by The Titan's Curse, the third book of the five books in the series.

Percy Jackson: Sea of Monsters, a film adaptation of the book, was released on August 7, 2013. The book was adapted for the second season of the Disney+ television series Percy Jackson and the Olympians; it premiered on December 10, 2025.

== Plot ==
After dreaming about Grover being hunted by a monster, Percy wakes on the last day of his peaceful seventh-grade year at Meriwether College Prep. He has befriended Tyson, a homeless child the school has taken on as a form of charity. In gym class, while playing dodgeball, Percy is attacked by Laestrygonians but is saved by Tyson and Annabeth, who was returning to Camp Half-Blood after having dreams about the camp in danger.

The three take a magical taxi driven by the Graeae to camp. There, they see campers led by Clarisse La Rue battling two Colchis bulls. Tyson is granted permission to move past the camp's boundary to save Percy again, revealing that he is a baby cyclops and Percy's half-brother, as he is also a son of Poseidon.

Someone has weakened the protective walls of Camp Half-Blood by poisoning the tree of the late demigod Thalia Grace (daughter of Zeus and childhood friend of Grover, Annabeth and Luke), leaving the campers vulnerable to future monster attacks. Camp activities director Chiron is accused of poisoning the tree and is fired. Before leaving, Chiron notes that only the Golden Fleece can save the camp.

Due to his charm and skill with a sword, Tantalus becomes the new activities director. As a reward for winning a chariot race, Tantalus sends Clarisse to find the Golden Fleece and forbids anyone else from leaving camp without his permission. After talking with the god Hermes about the fate of his son Luke, Percy leaves camp with Annabeth and Tyson to find Grover. Aided by a hippocampus named Rainbow, the trio reach the Princess Andromeda, a cruise ship filled with monsters and demigods that allied with the titan Kronos. On board the vessel, they are captured by Luke, who is working to revive Kronos. The trio escapes on an emergency lifeboat and takes shelter in a hideout that Annabeth, Thalia, and Luke built as children. A hydra attacks them there, but Clarisse saves them on her ship, the CSS Birmingham.

Annabeth, Percy, and Tyson join Clarisse's quest to the Bermuda Triangle. To enter the Triangle, the ship tries to pass between Charybdis and Scylla, who attack and destroy it. Clarisse gets separated from the others while Tyson seemingly dies in the explosion, so Percy and Annabeth board a lifeboat and head to the nearest island. After traveling through the narrow strait that Charybdis and Scylla guarded, the two land on the island of the witch-queen Circe. Realizing that she has turned dozens of men into guinea pigs, they turn the guinea pigs back into men and escape on the pirate's ship Queen Anne's Revenge, which Percy can control.

The duo manage to pass the sirens and reach the island of the cyclops Polyphemus, discovering that he has captured Clarisse. Before journeying to the island's center, Percy and Annabeth meet Grover, pretending to be a female cyclops to trick Polyphemus into not eating him. Tyson also arrives to help, having been rescued by Rainbow from the Birmingham's wreckage. They find the Golden Fleece, but Polyphemus destroys the Queen Anne's Revenge, forcing the group to escape on Rainbow and a few other hippocampi. In Miami, Percy gives the fleece to Clarisse to fly back to camp alone as per her prophecy, but Luke captures him and the others. Taken aboard the Princess Andromeda, Percy makes contact with Camp Half-Blood through the goddess Iris and tricks Luke into confessing that he poisoned Thalia’s tree, exonerating Chiron, who is reinstated. Enraged, Luke battles Percy, but Chiron and other centaurs known as the Party Ponies arrive to rescue them.

The Golden Fleece is hung on Thalia's pine tree, which is cured. Having cleared the obstacle of Polyphemus luring in searchers through the Golden Fleece, Grover is given a furlough on his quest to find the god Pan. The camp holds a second chariot race, which Percy and Annabeth win with Tyson's help, who departs after accepting an offer from Poseidon to work in the god's underwater forges. However, the Fleece's magic is too strong, and it resurrects Thalia, providing another possible demigod for the Great Prophecy, which Percy realizes was Kronos' intention all along.

== Characters ==
Percy Jackson
The son of Poseidon; a 13-year-old demigod who goes to the island of Polyphemus in the Bermuda Triangle to find Grover and recover the Golden Fleece. He is accompanied by Annabeth and Tyson, his half-brother, on the quest. He is successful in the end and gives Clarisse the Fleece while he is attacked by Luke on his way to the Camp. However, he and his friends are rescued by Chiron and the Party Ponies.
Annabeth Chase
The daughter of Athena; a 13-year-old demigod who is a friend of Percy. She accompanies Percy to the island of Polyphemus and rescues him from Circe's island on the way. Annabeth is injured by Polyphemus and recovers with the help of the Golden Fleece. She accompanies Percy to Camp after Chiron succeeds in rescuing them from the hands of Luke and the Titan army.
Grover Underwood
The guard for Percy given by the gods, a satyr who has been captured by Polyphemus during his search for the wild god Pan. Due to his poor eyesight, Polyphemus mistakes Grover for a female Cyclops. He is rescued by his friends Percy and Annabeth.
Clarisse La Rue
Daughter of Ares who was given the quest of retrieving the Golden Fleece. With the help of Percy and his friends, she is successful in her quest. Percy gives her the Fleece that she takes to Camp Half-Blood. Polyphemus wishes to wed her after it is revealed to him that Grover is a male satyr.
Luke Castellan
The main antagonist, now 20; works for Kronos. He captures Percy and the rest before being thwarted by Chiron and his brethren, the Party Ponies.
Tyson the Cyclops
Percy's half brother; he is initially portrayed as a homeless child before Annabeth helps Percy realize that he is a Cyclops. After being claimed by Poseidon, Tyson experiences a great deal of prejudice against his race, although he befriends Charles Beckendorf who trains him in metalworking. He accompanies Percy and Annabeth in their quest and befriends a hippocampus whom he names Rainbow. He is very big and has one brown eye. When Clarisse's ship explodes, he is presumed dead until it is learned that he survived due to his immunity to fire and Rainbow rescuing him from the wreckage. Displaying a talent in metalworking, Tyson accepts an offer to work in Poseidon's underwater Cyclops forges and he crafts Percy a wristwatch shield as well as weapons for the second chariot race.
Tantalus
An ancient king and the demigod son of Zeus who was cursed for cooking his son and feeding him to the gods. As a punishment, Zeus killed Tantalus and took him to Hades in the Underworld who cursed him to always suffer starvation and thirst which takes the form of food and drink always moving away from him no matter what Tantalus does. After Chiron is fired under suspicion of poisoning Thalia's pine tree, Tantalus is hired as the new activities director at Camp Half-Blood where he is shown to be sadistic and cruel, greatly enjoying tormenting Percy and his friends and blatantly showing favoritism towards Clarisse La Rue. Tantalus reinstates the camp's chariot races and is more concerned with the outcome than the attack by Stymphalian birds. After Percy tricks Luke into confessing and exonerates Chiron, Dionysus dismisses Tantalus. In his last moments on Earth, Tantalus' curse appears to finally break as he catches a cheeseburger, but he is returned to the Underworld before he can eat it.
Charles Beckendorf
The friendly fifteen-year-old head of the Hephaestus cabin who goes only by his last name. Due to his father employing Cyclopes in his forges, Beckendorf lacks the prejudice towards Tyson that the other campers have and as a result, he befriends Tyson and trains him in metalworking. Beckendorf sets up the chariot race tracks and he faces off with Percy and Annabeth in the final race and is defeated thanks to Tyson's wristwatch shield invention.
Rainbow
A friendly hippocampus summoned by Percy for a ride to the Princess Andromeda who also befriends Tyson. He later rescues Tyson from the wreckage of the CSS Birmingham and helps to carry Percy and his friends to Miami. He transports Tyson to the underwater Cyclops forges of Poseidon at the end of the book.
Agrius and Oreius
The mythical bear twins who act as Luke's henchmen throughout the book. During Chiron's rescue mission, one of the Party Ponies kills Oreius with an arrow through the head as he prepares to rip apart Annabeth and Grover. Agrius is left so stunned that Blackjack the pegasus can break free, kick Agrius in the head, killing him, and escape.
Circe
A Greek goddess of magic and the daughter of Hecate and Helios who runs a spa on an island in the Sea of Monsters. Over the centuries, she is shown to have captured numerous ships and planes that have entered the Sea of Monsters, also known to mortals as the Bermuda Triangle, and transforms men into guinea pigs while giving women a spa treatment. Many of the men are then sold as classroom pets while she keeps the most troublesome in a cage. When Percy and Annabeth arrive on the island, Circe transforms Percy into a guinea pig, but Annabeth can break the spell by using special multivitamins provided by Hermes which also make Annabeth temporarily immune to her magic. Annabeth inadvertently turns back Circe's other caged victims, including Blackbeard and his crew who overrun the island while Percy and Annabeth escape on the Queen Anne's Revenge.
Reyna Ramírez-Arellano
The demigod daughter of Bellona who appears as one of the attendants on Circe's island who looks after Annabeth. Although she is unnamed in The Sea of Monsters, she is identified as one of Circe's attendants in the book The Son of Neptune and The Mark of Athena with Annabeth specifically recognizing her in the latter.
Hylla Ramírez-Arellano
The demigod daughter of Bellona who appears as an attendant on Circe's island, specifically the one who greets Percy and Annabeth upon their arrival on the island. While she is only addressed as Hylla in The Sea of Monsters, she reappears as the Queen of the Amazons in The Son of Neptune where Percy recognizes her from their previous meeting.
Blackbeard
The famous pirate who is also a demigod son of Ares. Captured and turned into a guinea pig centuries before by Circe along with his crew, he is inadvertently set free by Annabeth and he is left marooned on the island when Percy and Annabeth steal the Queen Anne's Revenge to escape. In The Son of Neptune, The Mark of Athena and The Blood of Olympus, it's revealed that he had subsequently destroyed the island's resort and escaped with Reyna and Hylla as his slaves before they forced him to let them go.
Blackjack
A pure black pegasus who makes a cameo as Luke's prisoner and unwilling steed near the end of the book. He makes his escape when Chiron rescues Percy, Annabeth, Grover, and Tyson, killing Agrius who had been holding Blackjack prisoner for Luke. As revealed in The Titan's Curse, Blackjack, crediting Percy with his escape, subsequently followed him back to Camp Half-Blood where he becomes Percy's loyal friend and steed.
Thalia Grace
The demigod daughter of Zeus and a childhood friend of Luke, Annabeth, and Grover who mainly appears through dreams. Several years before the book, she was killed in a monster attack and turned into the pine tree that powers the borders of the camp which is now in danger due to Luke poisoning it. After the Golden Fleece is used to cure the tree, Thalia is resurrected by the Fleece's power in another attempt by Kronos to control the Great Prophecy.

== Critical reception ==
The Sea of Monsters received generally positive reviews with reviewers praising the storyline, the themes and the author's style of writing. "In a feat worthy of his heroic subjects, Riordan crafts a sequel stronger than his compelling debut," said a Publishers Weekly review. School Library Journal singled out the novel's plot and main character, stating, "Percy is an appealing kid, and the subject of a chilling prophecy may resonate with readers." Child magazine wrote, "Featuring the cliff-hangers and sassy attitude kids loved in The Lightning Thief – plus a surprising new family secret – this outstanding sequel should win over a fresh legion of fans." Children's Literature called the writing extraordinary and added, "This book, sequel to The Lightning Thief, is an amazing mixture of mythology and young adult fiction." Matt Berman, of Common Sense Media, praised the book, saying "The Percy Jackson series continues to be pure fun, with the author doing nearly everything right to produce a book that few kids will be able to resist." Norah Piehl of Kidsreads.com lauded the style of the book, and noted similarities with its prequel. It sold over 100,000 copies in hardcover by the time paperback copies were released in April 2007.

However, Kirkus Reviews was critical of the book, writing, "it's doubtful Percy wouldn't guess Tyson's otherworldly connection immediately after the dodgeball game ... some of the humor will zip over the heads of the target audience" although they added, "Percy's sardonic narration and derring-do would keep the pages turning."

=== Awards ===
- 2006 Book Sense Top Ten Summer Pick
- 2006 Child magazine Best Book
- 2006 Kirkus Reviews Best Fantasy Sequel
- 2006 Barnes & Noble Best of 2006 for Kids & Teens
- 2006 Voice of Youth Advocates (VOYA) Top Shelf Fiction Pick for Middle School Readers
- 2007 Cooperative Children's Book Center choice
- 2007 Young Adult Library Services Association (YALSA) Best Book for Young Adults
- 2009 Mark Twain Award (Riordan's The Lightning Thief won the previous year)

== Adaptations ==
=== Audiobook ===
On September 6, 2006, a seven-hour and 54 minute audiobook version of The Sea of Monsters, read by actor Jesse Bernstein, who also narrated The Lightning Thief's audiobook, was published worldwide by Listening Library.

AudioFile magazine praised the audiobook, raving, "This action-packed book (second in a series) will delight fans of Percy Jackson, the half-blood son of Poseidon, as Percy once again battles mythical monsters in modern-day settings while on his mission to save the tree that guards Camp Half-Blood." They praised Bernstein, saying "Narrator Jesse Berns helps listeners slip right into the oddly engaging world that Riordan creates, in which contemporary teen characters and those from classical mythology intermingle" and that he could successfully portray teenagers while keeping the pace fast allowing listeners time to revel in the book's humor. Auditions have already been cast for this yet-to-be blockbuster. There may still be a few spaces for extras, though. The magazine Publishers Weekly raved about Bernstein's "snappy delivery and all the right funny touches" that made the "action-packed fantasy such fun."

=== Film adaptation ===
Following the box office and DVD success of the movie, Percy Jackson & the Olympians: The Lightning Thief, a film adaptation of The Sea of Monsters was first reported in early 2011. In fall 2011, it was confirmed that 20th Century Fox would release the film on March 27, 2013. Filming began in April 2012. In February 2012, Mary Birdsong, Missi Pyle and Yvette Nicole Brown were cast as the Gray Sisters. In March 2012, Nathan Fillion joined the cast as Hermes and Anthony Head, replacing Pierce Brosnan, as Chiron. In April 2012, Paloma Kwiatkowski was cast as Thalia and The Hunger Games star Leven Rambin has been cast as Clarisse La Rue. It was announced on May 8, 2012, that the film had moved up to March 15, 2013, but was later postponed for an August 16, 2013 release. Fox decided on a final release date for August 7, 2013. Logan Lerman returned as Percy Jackson in the movie. Jake Abel also reprised his role as Luke Castellan. In January 2012, The Secret Circle star Grey Damon was cast as Chris Rodriguez.

=== Graphic novel ===
The Sea of Monsters was published as a graphic novel on June 2, 2013.

=== Television adaptation ===
On February 7, 2024, the Disney+ television series Percy Jackson and the Olympians was renewed for a second season that will adapt The Sea of Monsters. The season premiered on December 10, 2025.

== Sequel ==
The novel was followed by The Titan's Curse, released on May 1, 2007. In The Titan's Curse, Percy, Grover, Annabeth and Thalia go to a school to recruit two powerful demigods. Like its predecessors, this book was well received and reviewers praised its humorous style and the plot of the story.
