= The Lost Hero =

2010 novel by Rick Riordan

- First edition cover
- Author: Rick Riordan
- Cover artist: John Rocco
- Language: English
- Series: The Heroes of Olympus
- Release number: 1
- Genre: Children's fantasy; Action fiction; Adventure fiction; Middle grade fiction; Classical mythology; More genres: Greek mythology; Roman mythology; Children's fiction
- Publisher: Disney-Hyperion Books
- Publication date: October 12, 2010
- Publication place: United States
- Media type: Print (hardcover and paperback), audiobook, e-book
- Pages: 557 (first ed., hardcover)
- ISBN: 978-1-4231-1339-3
- OCLC: 526057827
- LC Class: PZ7.R4829 Los 2010
- Preceded by: The Last Olympian (from Percy Jackson & the Olympians)
- Followed by: The Son of Neptune

The Lost Hero is a 2010 American children's fantasy action-adventure middle grade children's fiction novel based on Greco-Roman classical mythology written by American author Rick Riordan. It was published on October 12, 2010, and is the first book in The Heroes of Olympus series, a sequel to the Percy Jackson & the Olympians series. It is preceded by The Last Olympian of Percy Jackson & the Olympians and followed by The Son of Neptune. The novel has since been translated into many languages and released as a hardcover, e-book, audiobook, and paperback.

The story follows Jason Grace, a Roman demigod with no memory of his past. He, along with Piper McLean, a daughter of Aphrodite, and Leo Valdez, a son of Hephaestus, is given a quest to rescue Hera, the queen of gods, from the clutches of Gaea, the primordial goddess of the earth. It is the first book in the Camp Half-Blood chronicles to use third-person narration, switching between the points of view of Jason, Piper, and Leo.

The Lost Hero received positive reviews from critics for its complex and mature plot when compared to its predecessors. Criticism was focused on its stretched action sequences and dialogues. At its peak, the novel has appeared first on The New York Times bestseller list, the USA Today bestseller list, The Wall Street Journal bestseller list, and the Publishers Weekly bestseller list. It was named the best children's book of 2010 by Barnes & Noble and won the Junior Young Reader's Choice Award in 2013.

== Plot ==
Jason Grace awakens on a school bus that belongs to the Wilderness School, unable to remember anything about his past. He is next to Piper McLean, his apparent girlfriend, and Leo Valdez, his apparent best friend.All three are part of a class field trip to the Grand Canyon. After they arrive there, a classmate, Dylan, turns into a storm spirit (called a venti) and attacks the trio and their trip leader, Coach Gleeson Hedge. In the ensuing fight, Jason battles the spirit and surprises everyone with his powers, including himself. Hedge is revealed to be a satyr and is captured by the storm spirit as it flees. A flying chariot with two demigods appears on the scene.The female demigod, Annabeth Chase, expresses her frustration upon seeing that her missing boyfriend, Percy Jackson, is not there as she had hoped, as he has been missing for three days without a trace.Jason, Piper, and Leo are told they are Greek demigods and are taken to Camp Half-Blood. There, Leo is revealed as a son of Hephaestus, Piper as a daughter of Aphrodite, and Jason as a son of Zeus. Juno, the Roman form of Hera, appears to Jason and tells him he is also her champion.

Leo, who has the rare ability to conjure fire, does not use nor tell anyone about it out of guilt about his mother's death seven years prior. The ability of summoning fire is an ability granted upon the children of Hephaestus, but Hephaestus' cabin remarks that it is a 'curse', and that the last Hephaestus child to be given this ability, Thomas Ferriner (spelled Faynor in the book) caused the Great Fire of London due to his inability to control his powers. Meanwhile, Jason finds out about his sister Thalia Grace, a daughter of Zeus and lieutenant of the Hunters of Artemis. Leo discovers a damaged mechanical bronze dragon in the woods and rejuvenates it. Shortly thereafter, the three are given a quest to rescue Hera from danger. After encountering Boreas, Piper, Jason, and Leo discover that their enemies are working under orders from Gaea, the Greek primordial goddess of the Earth, to overthrow the gods. Throughout their journey, they overcome numerous obstacles and eventually manage to save Coach Hedge, and also meet Thalia and the Hunters, who have also been looking for Percy. Thalia and Jason reunite for the first time since Jason was two, but they are separated on the way to Aeolus's castle. After almost being imprisoned by Aeolus under Gaea's orders, the trio manages to escape and end up in San Francisco.

They defeat the giant Enceladus at Mount Diablo and rescue Piper's father, who was being held captive. After saving Piper's dad, she gives him a potion given to her by Aphrodite and he forgets about the mythical world. The trio, along with the Hunters of Artemis, travel to the Wolf House and defeat the forces of Gaea, saving Hera. They temporarily stall Gaea's plans but are unable to destroy the ancient beings. Meanwhile, at camp, Leo creates plans for a ship that can sail to Greece, and the Hephaestus campers decide to build it, appointing Leo as their new counselor. With part of his memory returned, Jason realizes that he is a son of Zeus's Roman form Jupiter, and a hero from a Roman counterpart camp to Camp Half-Blood called Camp Jupiter somewhere near San Francisco. Hera, known as Juno to the Romans, has switched him with the Greek hero Percy Jackson, who is now at the Roman camp with no memory of his previous life. Camp Half-Blood and Camp Jupiter have had a ruthless rivalry, and whenever they come into contact, things never end well.

=== Characters ===
- Jason Grace – the champion of Juno, as well as the son of Jupiter and Beryl Grace. As the son of Jupiter, Jason can manipulate the air, control the weather, and create lightning. He suffers from amnesia for most of the story.
- Piper McLean – daughter of Aphrodite and Tristan McLean, a Cherokee film actor. She is in love with Jason Grace and has a dagger named Katoptris, previously wielded by Helen of Troy. She also has the rare gift of charmspeak.
- Leo Valdez – son of Hephaestus and Esperanza Valdez. He has a magical tool belt that will produce any tool that can be found in an average mechanical shop. He can also create fire from nothing, a rare ability sometimes found in Hephaestus's children.
- Annabeth Chase – demigod daughter of Athena. She rescues Jason, Piper, and Leo while on the search for Percy Jackson, her missing boyfriend.
- Coach Gleeson Hedge – satyr who was assigned to watch over two clueless-about-their-powers demigods, Piper and Leo, until they could be safely brought to Camp Half-Blood, and suddenly has to guard a third, Jason. He is taken captive after saving Leo's life twice.
- Thalia Grace – Jason's sister and lieutenant of the Hunters of Artemis.

== Composition and marketing ==
After realizing how many Greek and Roman myths he had left untouched as well as the immense success of the original series, Riordan began writing a second series, using inspiration for his storyline from experiences that he and his children had while playing video and role-playing games such as World of Warcraft and Scion. After creating the storyline, Riordan created three new main characters—Jason, Piper, and Leo—but continued to use the previous main characters such as Annabeth and Grover as secondary characters. Unlike the Percy Jackson & the Olympians series which uses first-person narration solely from Percy's point of view, the second series is told in third-person, with the point of view alternating between various main characters. In The Lost Hero, those characters are Jason, Piper, and Leo. Although initially uncertain how fans would react, Riordan later found that they enjoyed the new format, as it allowed them to learn more about each character.

The novel begins six months after the events of The Last Olympian, which allowed continuity with the first series, so previous characters could be included and readers would not be confused. Riordan says that "it was my way of letting them revisit that world in a fresh twist, but also to catch up with Percy and Annabeth and the rest of the gang from the first series". He also decided to include the Roman gods after many readers requested that Riordan write a new series on Roman gods, who are the Roman equivalent of the Greek gods, with some minor changes in personality. He pondered on how the Roman aspect of the gods would be after moving from Greece to Rome to America. After a while, "playing with that idea gave me the idea for the new series".

Before The Lost Hero was released, Disney-Hyperion released several sneak peeks in an effort to build up publicity for the books release. This included releasing a preview of the first two chapters of the book as well as releasing the book cover. Along with the excerpt, Disney-Hyperion released information about the series and characters, a book trailer, and an event kit. To celebrate the release of the book, a release party took place at BookPeople in Austin, Texas. The party began at 4 pm with over 800 visitors including Riordan himself. The party featured food, races, and rock climbing. Afterward, over 10,000 joined Riordan on an online webchat where he read the first two chapters and answered questions from the fans. He then signed one copy of the book and announced "that seven 'lucky demigods' will be selected in a sweepstakes to attend an exclusive one-week session at Camp Half-Blood at Bookpeople in July 2011".

== Release ==
The novel was first released in the United States on October 12, 2010: the hardcover had a 2.5 million copy first printing, and audiobook and e-book formats were also released. Riordan stated that he intended to finish a new book in the series every year, completing it in 2014.

Upon release, The Lost Hero was a No. 1 bestseller on The New York Times bestseller list, USA Today bestseller list, The Wall Street Journal bestseller list, and the Publishers Weekly bestseller list. As of January 30, 2011, The Lost Hero has been on The New York Times best seller list for 14 weeks, ranked at number 1.

In the United Kingdom and Australia, English-language editions in paperback were also released October 4, 2012 by Puffin Books. To date, editions have been released in multiple languages. Although many non-English editions used John Rocco's cover art originally created for the US edition, a few – and the Puffin editions – have unique covers by other illustrators.

The book received a Lexile score of 660L, making it age- and difficulty-appropriate for the average 8-11 year-old. On Scholastic, the book is recommended to teachers as appropriate material for grades 9–12. Reviewers for both Publishers Weekly and Common Sense Media gave the book a rating of 10+.

== Reception ==
The Lost Hero received generally positive reviews from critics. Publishers Weekly gave a favorable review, stating that "Riordan's storytelling is as polished as ever, brimming with wit, action, and heart". The Seattle Times's Karen Macpherson called the Greek and Roman mix "fascinating" and also said that the "characters are interesting and well-developed, and the richly complex story has Riordan's trademark wry humor and nearly nonstop action".

Few reviewers criticized certain aspects of the novel. Vicky Smith of Kirkus Reviews, for example, wrote that there are "far too many pages of stretched-out action, telling not showing and awkward dialogue" while believing that the novel would be enjoyed by "[d]ie-hard fans". She positively noted that the "Greek-vs.-Roman tension tantalizes" and that "incidental details that bring the gods into the story often shine." Lauren Berkes of The National Post appreciated the novel, writing, "Along the way, the novel has a lot of action, a bit of magic, a freaky security system and a metal dragon" but recommended that readers read the predecessor series first as "it will help you to understand a lot of the concepts in The Lost Hero."

Others were appreciative of the book as an excellent sequel to Percy Jackson and the Olympians. Anita Burkam of The Horn Book Magazine wrote in her review, "Riordan extends the franchise in a logical direction while maximizing the elements that made the first series so popular: irreverent heroes, plenty of tension-filled moments fighting monsters, and authentic classical mythology mixed in with modern life." Carrie R. Wheadon of Common Sense Media rated it 4/5 and opined, "Percy Jackson series spin-off is almost as delightful" and observes, "The story set-up isn't terribly smooth, and this is a denser read than the first few Percy Jackson books, but once the action heats up, that's easily forgotten." Voice of Youth Advocates comments, "The tale is longer than the Percy Jackson originals and can drag a bit at times, but fans hungry for further adventures in Riordan's modernized mythological realm will be well satisfied."

Other elements of the novel were also well received. Booklist wrote that "the backstory of a master plan to unseat the gods is complex but is doled out in manageable bits with a general air of foreboding", while also appreciating "[f]lashes of humor [that] lighten the mood at times". They conclude, "[w]ith appealing new characters within a familiar framework, this spin-off will satisfy the demand for more." KidsReads appreciated the book for its knowledge, writing, "I always learn something new whenever I read these books, and it certainly helps that I laugh along the way" and also notes, "this time, they cross over to Roman mythology, and the sometimes-blurred lines between the two cultures are examined in closer detail." School Library Journal wrote that "Riordan excels at clever plot devices and at creating an urgent sense of cliff-hanging danger" and observed, "[t]he young heroes deal with issues familiar to teens today." The Lost Hero won the Junior Young Reader's Choice Award in 2013. It was also named the best children's book of 2010 by Barnes & Noble.

== Sequel ==
The Son of Neptune was released on October 4, 2011.
