= Percy Jackson: Sea of Monsters =

2013 film by Thor Freudenthal

- Theatrical release poster
- Directed by: Thor Freudenthal
- Screenplay by: Marc Guggenheim
- Based on: The Sea of Monsters by Rick Riordan
- Produced by: Karen Rosenfelt; Michael Barnathan
- Starring: Logan Lerman; Brandon T. Jackson; Alexandra Daddario; Jake Abel; Douglas Smith; Stanley Tucci
- Cinematography: Shelly Johnson
- Edited by: Mark Goldblatt
- Music by: Andrew Lockington
- Production companies: Fox 2000 Pictures; Sunswept Entertainment; 1492 Pictures
- Distributed by: 20th Century Fox
- Release date: August 7, 2013 (United States)
- Running time: 106 minutes
- Countries: United States; Canada
- Language: English
- Budget: $90 million
- Box office: $200.9 million

Percy Jackson: Sea of Monsters is a 2013 fantasy film directed by Thor Freudenthal from a screenplay by Marc Guggenheim, based on the 2006 novel The Sea of Monsters by Rick Riordan. The sequel to Percy Jackson & the Olympians: The Lightning Thief (2010), it is the second installment in the Percy Jackson film series.

The film continues the adventures of Percy Jackson (Logan Lerman) and his friends as they journey to the Sea of Monsters to retrieve the Golden Fleece in order to save the tree barrier that protects their home. Lerman, Brandon T. Jackson, Alexandra Daddario, and Jake Abel reprise their roles from the previous film, while Nathan Fillion and Anthony Head replace Dylan Neal and Pierce Brosnan, respectively. New additions to the cast include Leven Rambin, Douglas Smith, and Stanley Tucci.

Percy Jackson: Sea of Monsters was released theatrically in the United States on August 7, 2013, by 20th Century Fox. The film received mixed reviews from critics, with praise for its visuals and action, but criticism for its plot and characters. It grossed $200.9 million worldwide against a production budget of $90 million. Disney gained the adaptation rights to the Percy Jackson novels following its acquisition of 21st Century Fox in 2019, upon which Riordan pitched a television adaptation that premiered on Disney+ in 2023.

== Plot ==
Seven years before the events of the film, young Annabeth Chase, Thalia Grace, Luke Castellan and Grover Underwood were pursued by monsters on their way to Camp Half Blood. When Thalia sacrificed herself to save her friends, her father, Zeus, honored her act by turning her into a tree, which formed a protective barrier around the camp, keeping everyone inside within a safe zone.

In the present day, Percy Jackson now attends camp and has befriended Annabeth and Grover. His quest for Zeus's lightning bolt (Note: As depicted in Percy Jackson & the Olympians: The Lightning Thief (2010)) has faded in popularity and he is called a one-quest wonder by camp bully Clarisse La Rue. He is joined at camp by a young cyclops named Tyson, a previously unknown son of a sea-nymph and Poseidon, and therefore Percy's older half-brother. After camp is attacked by a Colchis bull, the campers discover Thalia's tree has been poisoned by Luke and the barrier is weakening.

Annabeth learns about the healing powers of the Golden Fleece, which Grover senses is located off the coast of Florida, and they propose a quest to retrieve it to use to heal Thalia's tree. As it will involve crossing the Sea of Monsters (known to humans as the Bermuda Triangle), camp counsellor Mr. D denies them, but then claims the idea as his own and selects Clarisse for the quest. Meanwhile, Percy consults the Oracle of Delphi, who tells of a prophecy that a half-blood of one of the three elder gods will one day either save or destroy Olympus. Chiron informs Percy that as he is the only living human half-blood of the eldest gods, the Prophecy may refer to him.

Percy, Annabeth, Grover, and Tyson decide to leave camp in pursuit of the Fleece. They ride in the Chariot of Damnation (a New York City cab) as far as Washington D.C., where its drivers — the Graeae — eject them for lacking enough drachmas. Demi-gods aligned with Luke kidnap Grover, and with the help of Hermes, the others track him down to Luke's yacht, the "Andromeda". Luke imprisons the group and reveals his intention to use the Fleece to resurrect the Titan Kronos and have him destroy Olympus. Percy uses his ability to manipulate water to free the group, and they escape aboard one of the yacht's lifeboats.

The group crosses the Sea of Monsters and are swallowed by Charybdis. Working together with Clarisse, who was also swallowed along with her ship, they escape by blasting their way out of Charybdis's gut, and Percy guides the ship towards the coast of Florida. Landing there, they find the Fleece guarded by the cyclops Polyphemus in his lair, as well as Grover, disguised as a female cyclops. They rescue Grover, retrieve the Fleece, and trap Polyphemus, but they are ambushed by Luke. He makes Percy hand over the Fleece, while Tyson is shot with a crossbow while trying to protect Percy and falls into a roaring stream.

As Luke begins reviving Kronos, Percy frees everyone and the group engages Luke and his allies in combat. Percy loses to Luke but is saved by Tyson, who survived after being healed by the water. However, they are unable to prevent Kronos's resurrection, and Percy engages him in battle, eventually using his sword to defeat and re-imprison the titan. Annabeth is impaled by the Manticore and dies, but is resurrected by the Fleece.

The group returns to camp, where Chiron expresses uncertainty as to whether Percy has fulfilled the prophecy by preventing Luke's plan to destroy Olympus. Clarisse places the Fleece on Thalia's tree, which restores the barrier, but also resurrects Thalia. Percy realizes that, as Thalia is the daughter of Zeus, the prophecy of Olympus could now also refer to her.

== Cast ==
=== Half-Bloods ===
- Logan Lerman as Percy Jackson, son of Poseidon.
- Alexandra Daddario as Annabeth Chase, daughter of Athena.
  - Alisha Newton portrays a younger Annabeth.
- Douglas Smith as Tyson, Percy's older Cyclops half-brother.
- Leven Rambin as Clarisse La Rue, daughter of Ares.
- Brandon T. Jackson as Grover Underwood, a satyr and Percy's best friend and protector.
  - Bjorn Yearwood portrays a younger Grover.
- Jake Abel as Luke Castellan, son of Hermes.
  - Samuel Braun portrays a younger Luke.
- Paloma Kwiatkowski as Thalia Grace, daughter of Zeus.
  - Katelyn Mager portrays a younger Thalia.
- Grey Damon as Chris Rodriguez, a rogue demigod of unknown parentage who joins Luke on his quest to resurrect Kronos.

=== Gods and Titans ===
- Stanley Tucci as Mr. D / Dionysus, the god of wine, celebrations, ecstasy, and theatre and director of Camp Half-Blood. He was previously played by Luke Camilleri in the first film.
- Nathan Fillion as Hermes, Luke's father; the god of trade, thieves, travelers, sports, athletes, and messenger of the gods of Mount Olympus. He was previously played by Dylan Neal in the first film.
  - Octavia Spencer and Craig Robinson as the voices of Martha and George respectively, the snakes in Hermes' caduceus.
- Robert Knepper as the voice of Kronos, the Lord of the Titans, father of Zeus, Poseidon, Hades, Hestia, Demeter, Hera and Chiron, and Luke's master.

=== Other characters ===
- Anthony Stewart Head as Chiron, the activities director at Camp Half-Blood. Chiron is a centaur and the immortal son of Kronos and brother of Zeus, Poseidon, Hades, Demeter, Hestia and Hera. Chiron was previously played by Pierce Brosnan in The Lightning Thief.
- Robert Maillet as the motion capture of Polyphemus, an angry cyclops who keeps the Fleece with him.
  - Ron Perlman as the voice of Polyphemus
- Hunter Platin as Guard, the Cyclops that guards the Golden Fleece.
- Shohreh Aghdashloo as the voice of Oracle of Delphi
- Missi Pyle, Yvette Nicole Brown and Mary Birdsong as Tempest, Anger, and Wasp, the Graeae sisters.
- Jordan Weller as Ichneutae, the acolyte of Clarisse.
- Derek Mears and Aleks Paunovic as Cyclopes.

== Production ==
Reports of a second Percy Jackson film first surfaced in March 2011. On October 12, 2011, a sequel was officially confirmed by 20th Century Fox. Filming for Percy Jackson: Sea of Monsters began on April 16, 2012. The film was originally going to be released on March 15, 2013, but in May 2012, the release date was postponed to August 16, 2013. In April 2013, a final release date was set for August 7, 2013. Filming took place in Robert Burnaby Park in Burnaby, B.C.; however from June 20 to July 22, they filmed in New Orleans for Princess Andromeda scenes, including the former site of Six Flags New Orleans. More filming took place in January 2013. On January 22, 2013, Logan Lerman released a statement on Twitter that read "Last day of shooting on Percy Jackson 2" accompanied by a photo of the shooting.

=== Development ===
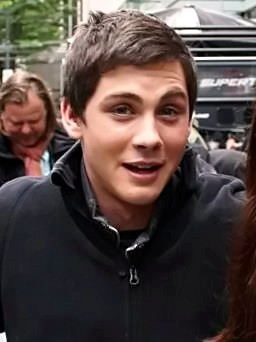
Logan Lerman on the last day of filming for Sea of Monsters.

In February 2011, it was revealed in the online subscription magazine Production Weekly that the film was in production. In another source, the lead cast members from the first movie were expected to return for their roles. Chris Columbus would not be returning as director, though he would be producing the movie together with Karen Rosenfelt (producer of the Twilight movie Breaking Dawn). Scott Alexander and Larry Karaszewski were hired as the scriptwriters. Marc Guggenheim was hired to re-write the screenplay and Alexander and Karaszewski were uncredited. On June 16, 2011, it was announced that Thor Freudenthal would be directing the movie. Shooting began in summer 2012. On October 12, 2011, it was announced that the film would be released on March 26, 2013. On April 6, it was announced that the movie was pushed up to August 7, 2013. On May 31, 2012, it was announced that the movie had been pushed back to August 16, 2013.

=== Filming ===
On January 13, 2012, a brand new production list was released and stated that filming would take place between April 26, 2012, and July 11, 2012. It was filmed in Vancouver, British Columbia, and New Orleans, Louisiana, with the abandoned Six Flags New Orleans serving as the filming location for the island of Polyphemus. Filming wrapped in July 2012, with reshoots taking place in January 2013.

== Reception ==
=== Critical response ===
On Rotten Tomatoes, the film has an approval rating of 42% based on reviews from 117 critics, with an average rating of 5.20/10. The website's consensus reads, "It's pretty and packed with action; unfortunately, Percy Jackson: Sea of Monsters is also waterlogged with characters and plots that can't help but feel derivative." On Metacritic, the film has a weighted average score of 39 based on 33 collected reviews, indicating "generally unfavorable reviews". Audiences polled by CinemaScore gave the film an average grade of "B+" on a scale from A+ to F, the same grade earned by the previous film.

Jim Vejvoda of IGN rated the movie a six out of ten: "There are worse sequels than the CG-heavy Percy Jackson: Sea of Monsters, but it's just such overly familiar territory." Gary Goldstein of the Los Angeles Times gave the film a positive review, saying that "tweens and young teens should be sufficiently distracted by the movie's brisk pace and heroic mayhem — if they're not too unnerved by its at times nightmarish imagery". James Rocchi of ScreenCrush wrote that the film "is hardly the stuff of legend, but by keeping the plot straightforward and the storytelling clean, it's an odyssey the intended young audience will be glad to take." Marsha McCreadie on RogerEbert.com rated the film two and a half stars out of four, calling it "a gentler-spirited, less flashy enterprise, though it still presents a natural world that can morph at the whim of a god."

Andy Webster of The New York Times commented: "Sea of Monsters is diverting enough — the director, Thor Freudenthal ... is savvy with effects and keeps his young cast on point — but it doesn’t begin to approach the biting adolescent tension of the Harry Potter movies." However, Michael Rechtshaffen of The Hollywood Reporter criticized the film as "lack[ing] the energetic zip of its predecessor," while Bruce Ingram of Chicago Sun-Times opined that "faithful fans of the novels will be unhappy with the liberties taken with the adaptation like they were with the first film." Connie Ogle of The Miami Herald wrote, "[Are] these characters merely prisoners — much like the audience — of a script so uninspired that it demands their stupidity?" Josh Bell of Las Vegas Weekly lambasted the series as a whole as "a thoroughly second-rate franchise ... with movies like Sea of Monsters, it can probably continue in acceptable mediocrity for years to come".

=== Box office ===
Percy Jackson: Sea of Monsters grossed $68,559,554 in North America and $133,688,197 internationally for a worldwide total of $202,247,751.

The film grossed $5.4 million on its opening day, taking the second spot at the domestic box office. During its extended five-day opening weekend, the film debuted at number four and grossed $23,258,113.

=== Accolades ===
Katelyn Mager was nominated for her performance at the 2014 Young Artist Award as Best Supporting Young Actress in a Feature Film.

== Soundtrack ==
The film's score was composed by Andrew Lockington. "My Songs Know What You Did in the Dark (Light Em Up)" by Fall Out Boy and "Cameo Lover" by Kimbra were featured in the movie but are not included in the soundtrack.

== Home media ==
The film was released on 3D Blu-ray, Blu-ray, and DVD on December 17, 2013. The film was additionally released for Digital HD download on December 3.

== Future ==
=== Proposed sequel ===
On March 25, 2014, Lerman stated that a sequel to Sea of Monsters would not be made. However, six days later, another report stated "Logan Lerman has said Percy Jackson 3 could still go ahead" and that the previous report was "taken out of context". At the 2015 Santa Barbara International Film Festival, Lerman said that while he found the Percy Jackson films fun to make, he had not heard anything about the production of a third film and expressed concern that he and his co-stars were growing too old for their parts.

=== Disney+ reboot series ===
The rights to the Percy Jackson novels were transferred to Disney following its acquisition of 21st Century Fox in 2019, upon which Riordan pitched a new adaptation in September of that year. On May 14, 2020, a Disney+ series separate from the Fox film series was announced on Riordan's Twitter account, where he stated that he and his wife Becky would be involved in the production of the series. Each season of the series would adapt one installment of the book series, with the first season being an adaptation of The Lightning Thief. The series was greenlit in January 2022, began production in June 2022, and premiered on December 19, 2023. Walker Scobell, Leah Sava Jeffries, and Aryan Simhadri respectively portray the three leads Percy, Annabeth, and Grover. While Riordan stated his intent to not have the main cast members of the films, such as Lerman, appear in the series, several supporting actors from the films have been cast for the series in minor roles.
