= The Heroes of Olympus =

Percy Jackson fantasy adventure book series

- Logo of the series
- The Lost Hero (2010); The Son of Neptune (2011); The Mark of Athena (2012); The House of Hades (2013); The Blood of Olympus (2014)
- Author: Rick Riordan
- Cover artist: John Rocco
- Country: United States
- Language: English
- Genre: Fantasy; mythic fiction
- Publisher: Disney Hyperion (US); Penguin Books/Puffin (UK, AU, NZ)
- Published: 2010–2014
- Media type: Print (hardcover and paperback), audiobook, e-book
- No. of books: 5
- Preceded by: Percy Jackson & the Olympians
- Followed by: The Trials of Apollo

The Heroes of Olympus is a pentalogy of fantasy novels written by American author Rick Riordan. It is the second of four book series in the Camp Half-Blood Chronicles, succeeding Percy Jackson & the Olympians, and preceding The Trials of Apollo and The Nico di Angelo Adventures. The novels detail a conflict between Greek demigods, Roman demigods, and Gaea.

The series can be read as a standalone series, but is meant to be read after Percy Jackson & the Olympians. Riordan introduces Roman mythology in the series alongside several new characters, primarily from the Roman Camp Jupiter. The first book of the series, The Lost Hero, was published on October 12, 2010. The final entry in the series, The Blood of Olympus, was published on October 7, 2014. Two sequel series, The Trials of Apollo and The Nico di Angelo Adventures, follow.

== Plot ==
The Heroes of Olympus is centered around a prophecy introduced in The Last Olympian that predicted seven demigods would unite to protect the world from an awakening new enemy, the Earth goddess Gaea. Demigods from the Greek camp, Camp Half-Blood, and a newfound Roman camp, Camp Jupiter, unite to save the world from being destroyed by Gaea.

Seven demigods — Annabeth Chase, Leo Valdez, Percy Jackson, and Piper McLean from Camp Half-Blood, with Jason Grace, Frank Zhang, and Hazel Levesque from Camp Jupiter — join forces. Some other important characters are Nico di Angelo, son of Hades; Reyna Ramirez-Arellano, Praetor of Camp Jupiter and daughter of Bellona; and Gleeson Hedge, a satyr.

== Books ==
=== The Lost Hero ===
The novel begins by introducing Jason, Piper, and Leo, three newly discovered demigods who travel to Camp Half-Blood in response to a prophecy. They set off on a quest to prevent the rebirth of the giant king Porphyrion and rescue Piper's father, who has been kidnapped by another giant, Enceladus. Along the way they have an encounter with The god of north winds, Boreales. Jason, who has amnesia, also begins to remember pieces of his past throughout the book —most importantly, he comes from a Roman camp for demigods. Camp Half-Blood resolves to seek out this other camp both to gain allies in the fight against Gaia, the giants' mother and commander, and to locate the missing demigod, Percy Jackson.

=== The Son of Neptune (Poseidon) ===
The novel opens with Percy Jackson, struck with amnesia, discovering Camp Jupiter and meeting several Roman demigods. After receiving a prophecy from Mars, Percy, Frank Zhang, and Hazel Levesque travel to Alaska to stop the rise of the giant Alcyoneus and free the god Thanatos, whom the giant has captured. After successfully completing their mission, the group returns to Camp Jupiter to defend it from yet another giant, Polybotes, and his army. After repelling this invasion, the demigods from Camp Jupiter go to meet the delegation from Camp Half-Blood, who arrive in the flying ship known as the Argo II. This book is set in June.

=== The Mark of Athena ===
After the Argo II unintentionally fires on Camp Jupiter after Leo Valdez is possessed to attack it, the seven demigods of the "Prophecy of Seven" — Percy Jackson, Annabeth Chase, Leo Valdez, Piper McLean, Jason Grace, Frank Zhang, and Hazel Levesque — rush to escape the angered Roman campers. The Argo II is damaged, and the group splits up to find supplies to help Leo fix it. Hazel and Leo go out to try to find Celestial bronze and lime for calcium carbonate when they encounter Nemesis, the universal (meaning Roman and Greek) goddess of revenge. Nemesis's form is different for both Leo and Hazel, Leo seeing his Aunt Rosa and Hazel seeing one of her old teachers. Nemesis tells Leo that the gods are split between their Greek and Roman forms, making them disoriented and confused. This means a civil war is on the rise between the Romans and the Greeks. Nemesis tells Leo that he will be the "seventh wheel", and not fit in with the Seven. She also tells Leo that he will stumble upon a problem that he cannot solve. Nemesis offers Leo help — for a price. She leaves Leo and Hazel frazzled, confused, and angry. The Seven travel to Rome, guided by the "Mark of Athena", a magical talisman designed to lead children of Athena to the missing Athena Parthenos. During their journey, they hear that Nico di Angelo has been captured by the Aloadae, and go to rescue him. Although they successfully free him and locate the statue, Annabeth and Percy are pulled into Tartarus by Gaea, and Nico promises Percy to get the other demigods to the "Doors of Death". This book is set between June and July. A graphic novel adaptation "The Mark of Athena Graphic Novel" was released September 26 2023.

=== The House of Hades ===
In Tartarus, Percy and Annabeth travel towards the "Doors of Death", the only pathway back to the mortal world, with help from Bob the Titan, hoping to escape and simultaneously stop more monsters from getting through. In the mortal world, the remaining demigods search for the mortal side of the Doors to help open them. They also meet with Reyna Avila Ramírez-Arellano, a Roman demigod; she, Nico, and Coach Hedge leave with the Athena Parthenos from Epirus, Greece, and Shadow Travel to Camp Half-Blood. Once reunited, the original seven sail for Greece, where they expect Gaea's main force will gather. This book is set in the first half of July. The Graphic novel adaptation "The House of Hades Graphic Novel" was released 24 September 2024.

=== The Blood of Olympus ===
While Reyna, Nico, and Coach Hedge travel towards Camp Half-Blood (where the Romans are preparing to attack the Greeks), the seven of the quest travel to Athens. With help from the gods, the demigods defeat the giants in Athens, where Leo sacrifices himself to defeat Gaea. He is later resurrected by his bronze dragon Festus and goes to find his crush Calypso. Unaware that he is alive, Camp Half-Blood and Camp Jupiter mourn his loss, determining to become allies and prevent such a deadly war from happening again. This book is set in the second half of July. The Graphic novel adaptation "The Blood of Olympus Graphic Novel" was released 29 September 2026.

== Supplementary works ==
=== The Demigod Diaries ===
Released August 14, 2012, The Demigod Diaries is a collection of short stories. Similar to The Demigod Files, it contains some new stories with character interviews, illustrations, puzzles, and a quiz. The four stories include:

- "The Diary of Luke Castellan": Thalia Grace and Luke Castellan meet Halcyon Green, Luke receives his knife, and the pair encounters Annabeth Chase. The events of the story take place roughly five years before The Lightning Thief, the first book of Percy Jackson & the Olympians.
- "Percy Jackson and the Staff of Hermes": Percy Jackson and Annabeth are sent by Hermes to retrieve his caduceus from the fire-breathing giant Cacus. The story takes place between The Last Olympian and The Lost Hero.
- "Leo Valdez and the Quest for Buford": Jason Grace, Leo Valdez, and Piper McLean confront a group of Maenads while searching for Buford the table, who has run off with an important piece of the unfinished Argo II. The story takes place at Camp Half-Blood between The Lost Hero and The Son of Neptune.
- "Son of Magic": Alabaster Torrington, a demigod son of Hecate who fought on Kronos's side, finds himself in a fight to the death with Lamia. He is alone after being banished from Camp Half-Blood following Kronos's defeat in The Last Olympian and asks the mortal Howard Claymore for help. This story, deemed non-canonical to the series itself by Riordan, with the events depicted in it directly contradicted those in The House of Hades and The Blood of Olympus, was written by his son Haley.

== Characters ==
=== Greeks ===
- Percy Jackson: The 17-year-old son of Poseidon from Camp Half-Blood. He is the narrator and main protagonist of the preceding series Percy Jackson & the Olympians. In The Son of Neptune, he is depicted fighting amnesia, given to him by the goddess Hera, during which his only memory is his girlfriend, Annabeth Chase. He can breathe underwater, talk to horses and aquatic life, and manipulate water.
- Annabeth Chase: The 17-year-old daughter of Athena, credited as "the smartest girl in camp" by Percy. She is also a gifted and dedicated architect.
- Piper McLean: The 15-year-old daughter of Aphrodite. She is one of the few children of Aphrodite who have the rare hereditary gift of "charmspeak" (the ability to magically convince people to do what the person in question says) and is described as beautiful by Jason Grace. She carries a knife called Katoptris (previously owned by Helen of Troy) that shows her visions of the future. She begins dating Jason during the series.
- Leo Valdez: The 15-year-old son of Hephaestus who can summon and control fire, a rare ability. He is famous among his cabinmates for repairing the automated bronze dragon Festus, who had given more experienced campers life-altering disabilities. He leads the building of the Argo II.
- Nico di Angelo: The 14-year-old son of Hades. Born in the 1930s in Italy, his father Hades sent him and his sister to the Lotus Hotel and Casino, that sucked them out of time for decades, so he only feels and looks 14. He was the only demigod who had knowledge of both camps before the war.
- Gleeson Hedge: A middle-aged satyr, formerly a coach at the Wilderness School. He joins the crew of the Argo II as the self-appointed chaperone.
- Thalia Grace: Lieutenant to Artemis and the Hunters of Artemis, who physically appears to be about 15. Was killed and her soul preserved as a tree prior to and during the first and second books of Percy Jackson and the Olympians. She is Jason Grace's biological sister, but a daughter of Zeus rather than Jupiter (Jupiter and Zeus are the same god in different aspects, making Jason a child of Rome and Thalia a child of Greece).
- Tyson: Percy's half-brother, and a cyclops. He loves peanut butter and is the boyfriend of Ella the harpy.
- Rachel Elizabeth Dare: Camp Half-Blood's oracle. She is neither a demigod nor a legacy, but a regular mortal human who was born with the gift to see through the Mist. She is the current Oracle, being a vessel for the Spirit of Delphi.
- Grover Underwood: Percy's best friend, and a satyr; he and Percy have an empathy link that allows them to sense one another. He is also gifted by Pan, the lord of the wild.

=== Romans ===
- Jason Grace: The 16-year-old son of Jupiter who can fly, control winds and lightning, and create storms. He is a natural-born leader and was a praetor before Hera took his memory and sent him to Camp Half-Blood.
- Hazel Levesque: The 13-year-old daughter of Pluto (the Roman aspect of Hades). She originally lived in the 1940s before dying to stop the rise of Alcyoneus and later being revived by her half-brother Nico. She can control precious metals and stones, navigate underground, and manipulate the Mist.
- Frank Zhang: The 16-year-old son of Mars (the Roman aspect of Ares) and a descendant of Poseidon on his mother's side. He has shapeshifting abilities.
- Reyna Avila Ramírez-Arellano: The 16-year-old daughter of the Roman goddess of war, Bellona. She has the power to give strength to others, but shares a bit of that person's pain in the process.
- Octavian: The 18-year-old son of Apollo (the Roman aspect of the Greek Apollo). He has the gift of prophecy and serves as an augur for Camp Jupiter.

== Inspirations and origins ==
After realizing how many Greek and Roman myths he had left untouched as well the immense success of the original series, Riordan began writing a second series, using inspiration for his storyline from experiences that he and his children had while playing video and role-playing games such as World of Warcraft and Scion. After creating the storyline, Riordan created three new main characters—Jason, Piper, and Leo—but continued to use the previous main characters such as Annabeth and Grover as secondary characters.

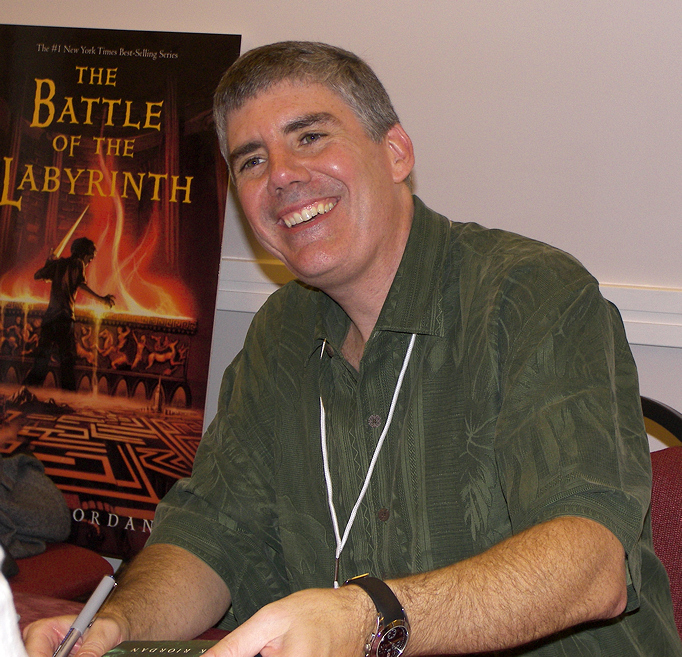
Rick Riordan (pictured) came up with The Heroes of Olympus after toying with the idea of Roman gods.

Unlike the Percy Jackson & the Olympians series, which uses first-person narration solely from Percy's point of view, the second series is told in third person, with the point of view alternating between various main characters. In The Lost Hero, those characters are Jason, Piper, and Leo. Although initially uncertain how fans would react, Riordan later found that they enjoyed the new format, as it allowed them to learn more about each character.

Riordan says that "It was my way of letting them revisit that world in a fresh twist, but also to catch up with Percy and Annabeth and the rest of the gang from the first series". He also decided to include the Roman gods after many readers requested that Riordan write a new series on Roman gods, who are the Roman equivalent of the Greek gods, with some minor changes in personality. He pondered on how the Roman aspect of the gods would be after moving from Greece to Rome to America. After a while, "playing with that idea gave me the idea for the new series".

== Publishing history ==
The Lost Hero, the first book in the Heroes of Olympus series, was released on October 12, 2010, as a hardcover, audiobook, and ebook. The initial publishing run consisted of 2.5 million copies. The book's official publication was preceded by several "sneak-peek" releases by Disney-Hyperion. A graphic novel version, adapted and illustrated by Orpheus Collar, was released October 7, 2014. Another graphic novel was made for The Son of Neptune.

== Follow-up series ==
A sequel pentalogy series titled The Trials of Apollo was released, with the first installment, The Hidden Oracle released on May 3, 2016. The second installment, The Dark Prophecy, was released on May 2, 2017. The third installment, The Burning Maze was released on May 1, 2018. The fourth installment, The Tyrant's Tomb was released on September 24, 2019. The Tower of Nero, the last book in the series, was released on October 6, 2020.

== Reception ==
The Lost Hero won the Barnes & Noble Best Book of 2010 award and was a Massachusetts Children's Book Award Honor book for 2014, among other honors. Rick Riordan was named "Author of the Year" for the novel at the 2011 Children's Choice Awards. The book was also recommended by the ALA Best Fiction for Young Adults list of 2012.

== See also ==
- Muses in popular culture
