= The Wild Zone =

2026 novel by Rick Riordan and Annabelle Oh

- Author: Rick Riordan; Annabelle Oh
- Cover artist: Devin Elle Kurtz
- Series: Camp Half-Blood
- Genre: Children's fiction; fantasy; Greek mythology retelling
- Publisher: Random House
- Publication date: September 29, 2026
- ISBN: 9798217445981
- Followed by: The Rite of Aphrodite

From the World of Percy Jackson: The Wild Zone, or simply The Wild Zone, is a 2026 children's fantasy novel by American authors Rick Riordan and Annabelle Oh. The first book in the Camp Half-Blood series, it follows Katie Kim, a demigod daughter of Ares.

The Wild Zone was published on September 29, 2026, by Random House, in hardcover, ebook, and audiobook formats.

== Background ==
On May 12, 2026, Rick Riordan announced that he would be collaborating with four different authors to develop Camp Half-Blood, a four book spin-off to Percy Jackson & the Olympians. The first book in the series, The Wild Zone, would be a collaboration between Riordan and Annabelle Oh.

== Reception ==
The Wild Zone debuted as a number one New York Times bestseller in Children's Middle Grade Hardcover.

== Sequel ==
A subsequent book, The Rite of Aphrodite, is scheduled to release March 30, 2027. It is narrated by Harper Rush, a demigod son of Aphrodite.
