= Jo Whittemore =

American writer (born 1977)

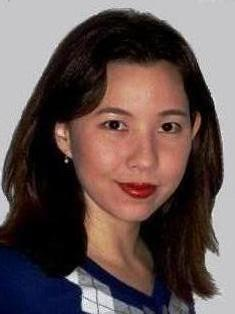
- Jo Whittemore
- Born: 1977 (age 48–49); Kentucky, U.S.
- Occupation: Author
- Writing career
- Period: 2006–present
- Genres: Children's; fantasy; humor
- Website: jowhittemore.com

Jo Whittemore (born 1977) is an American author of children's and young adult literature, ranging from fantasy to humorous contemporary. She also writes under the pen name Annabelle Oh.

== Books ==
=== The Silverskin Legacy ===
- Escape from Arylon (Llewellyn Worldwide, 2006)
- Curse of Arastold (Llewellyn Worldwide, 2006)
- Onaj's Horn (Llewellyn Worldwide, 2007)

=== Aladdin titles ===
- Front Page Face-Off (Aladdin Paperbacks 2010)
- Odd Girl In (Aladdin Paperbacks, 2011)
- D is for Drama (Aladdin Paperbacks, 2012)
- Me & Mom vs. the World (formerly released as Colonial Madness in 2015) (Aladdin Paperbacks, 2017)

=== Confidentially Yours series ===
- Brooke's Not-So-Perfect Plan (HarperCollins, 2016)
- Vanessa's Fashion Face-Off (HarperCollins, 2016)
- Heather's Crush Catastrophe (HarperCollins, 2016)
- The Secret Talent (HarperCollins, 2016)
- Brooke's Bad Luck (HarperCollins, 2017)
- Vanessa's Design Dilemma (HarperCollins, 2017)

=== Supergirl ===
- Supergirl: Age of Atlantis (Abrams Books, 2017)
- Supergirl: Curse of the Ancients (Abrams Books, 2018)
- Supergirl: Master of Illusion (Abrams Books, 2019)

=== Girls Who Code ===
- Lights, Music, Code! (Girls Who Code #3) (2018)

=== The Story Shadows series ===
- Maggie and the Story Shadows (Disney Publishing Worldwide, 2025)

=== Camp Half-Blood ===
- The Wild Zone (with Rick Riordan) (Camp Half-Blood #1) (Random House, 2026)
