= Camp Half-Blood =

Book series by Rick Riordan and other authors

- The Wild Zone (2026); The Rite of Aphrodite (2027)
- Author: Rick Riordan; Annabelle Oh (book 1); Kyle Lukoff (book 2); Jade Adia (book 3); Pablo Cartaya (book 4)
- Country: United States
- Genre: Children's fiction; fantasy; Greek mythology retelling
- No. of books: 4
- Preceded by: The Court of the Dead (The Nico di Angelo Adventures) (release order); The Lightning Thief (Percy Jackson & the Olympians) (chronologically)
- Followed by: The Sea of Monsters (Percy Jackson & the Olympians) (chronologically)

Camp Half-Blood is a fantasy novel series by American author Rick Riordan in collaboration with Annabelle Oh, Kyle Lukoff, Jade Adia, and Pablo Cartaya. The series is based on Greek mythology and takes place between the events of The Lightning Thief and The Sea of Monsters from the Percy Jackson & the Olympians series. After the release of the first book in the series, The Wild Zone, each book is expected to release every six months.

== Background ==
Rick Riordan stated about the Camp Half-Blood series:

"This new series gives me a chance to explore [the] idea [of what was happening back at camp between the books of the original series, when Percy, Annabeth, and Grover weren't around], while opening up Percy's world by introducing a new group of demigod heroes."

== Books ==
The Wild Zone was released on September 29, 2026, and is co-written by Rick Riordan and Annabelle Oh. It is told from the perspective of a daughter of Ares, Katie Kim.

The second book, The Rite of Aphrodite, is co-written by Riordan and Kyle Lukoff, and is scheduled to release on March 30, 2027. It is narrated by Harper Rush, a son of Aphrodite. The third book is co-written by Riordan and Jade Adia. It is told from the perspective of Zuri Chapman, a daughter of Apollo. The fourth book is co-written by Riordan and Pablo Cartaya and is told from the perspective of Benny Garcia, who is an unclaimed demigod.
