= The House of Hades =

2013 book by Rick Riordan

- First edition cover
- Author: Rick Riordan
- Cover artist: John Rocco
- Language: English
- Series: The Heroes of Olympus
- Release number: 4
- Genre: Children's fantasy; Action fiction; Adventure fiction; Middle grade fiction; Classical mythology; More genres: Greek mythology; Roman mythology; Children's fiction
- Publisher: Disney-Hyperion Books
- Publication date: October 8, 2013
- Publication place: United States
- Media type: Print (hardcover and paperback), audiobook, e-book
- Pages: 597 (first ed., hardcover)
- ISBN: 978-1-4231-4672-8
- OCLC: 946944987
- LC Class: PZ7.R48298 Hou 2013
- Preceded by: The Mark of Athena
- Followed by: The Blood of Olympus

The House of Hades is a 2013 American children's fantasy action-adventure middle grade children's fiction novel based on Greek and -Roman classical mythology written by American author Rick Riordan. It was published on October 8, 2013, and is the fourth book in The Heroes of Olympus series, preceded by The Mark of Athena and followed by The Blood of Olympus.

The story follows the Greek demigods Annabeth Chase, Leo Valdez, Piper McLean, Nico di Angelo, and Percy Jackson, and the Roman demigods Jason Grace, Hazel Levesque, and Frank Zhang on their quest to close the Doors of Death, stop the Giants from raising Gaea, and prevent war between Camp Jupiter and Camp Half-Blood. The novel is narrated in the third-person, alternating between the points of view of the seven demigods of the "Prophecy of Seven".

The novel received positive reviews from critics for its more mature themes compared to previous Riordan novels. During the first week of its release, The House of Hades sold about 350,000 copies, reaching the top of the bestseller lists of The New York Times, USA Today, The Globe and Mail and The Wall Street Journal.

== Plot ==
After Annabeth Chase and Percy Jackson fall into Tartarus at the end of The Mark of Athena, the other five demigods of the "Prophecy of Seven" (Frank Zhang, Hazel Levesque, Jason Grace, Leo Valdez and Piper McLean), aided by Nico di Angelo and Coach Hedge, prepare to go to Greece to find and close the Doors of Death from the mortal world in order to prevent the monsters of Gaea's army from continuously resurrecting. In Bologna, the Argo II is raided by the Kerkopes; Leo goes after them to retrieve his stolen Archimedes's sphere, and takes an agricultural book belonging to Triptolemus and an astrolabe made by Odysseus as recompense. He also sends the Kerkopes to harass the Roman army massing at Camp Half-Blood. In Venice, Frank, Hazel and Nico retrieve barley cakes designed to protect them from poison in the Necromanteion from Triptolemus. In exchange for the barley cakes, Frank has to get a replacement snake for Triptolemus’ chariot, which is powered by two snakes. After remembering that his father, Mars, can turn enemies to snakes, Frank decides to battle all the Katobleps (cow monsters) in exchange for a snake. He defeats all of the monsters and receives the blessing of Mars for his heroism, becoming physically stronger and gaining a snake for Triptolemus. During a later encounter with the bandit Sciron and after a meeting with the goddess Hecate, Hazel successfully learns to manipulate the Mist, a power that alters other people's reality layers by deceiving them.

At Jason's behest, the demigods travel to Split to visit the palace of Diocletian, retrieve his powerful scepter, and leave a note for Reyna (who has been asked by Annabeth to find the Greek demigods). The god Cupid, guardian of the scepter, refuses to relinquish it until Nico admits that he once had a crush on Percy Jackson. While sailing through the Adriatic Sea, the ship is attacked by Khione and the Boreads. Piper uses her powerful charmspeaking skills to defend the group. During the attack, Leo is transported to Ogygia, where he falls in love with Calypso. Although he leaves the island, Leo promises to return for her. While Leo is detained, the rest of the crew meets with Notus, who helps Jason to realize that he has chosen to be a Greek rather than a Roman demigod, settling an internal conflict within himself. Jason later gives up his praetorship to Frank in accordance with this decision. Arriving at the Necromanteion, the reunited crew is attacked by Clytius, Pasiphaë, and a group of their minions. Each of the demigods uses some aspect of their newly strengthened powers or identities to help defeat these monsters; for example, Hazel's new power and alliance with Hecate helps her defeat Pasiphaë and Clytius.

Meanwhile, Percy and Annabeth travel through Tartarus to the other side of the Doors of Death, aided by the Titan Iapetus, who now goes by "Bob" after a previous encounter with Percy, the giant Damasen, and a few other beings. As the other demigods fight in the world above, Percy and Annabeth's group reach the Doors of Death and fight the personification of Tartarus, eventually destroying the chains holding the Doors in place. Bob stays behind amongst hordes of angry monsters to defend the Doors while Percy and Annabeth escape and reunite with the other five demigods, who successfully close the Doors of Death. Reyna arrives on her dying Pegasus and Annabeth tasks Reyna, a Roman, with bringing the Athena Parthenos (using the Argo II's hold) back to Camp Half-Blood to appease both the Greeks and Romans, with Nico and Coach Hedge volunteering to accompany her.

=== Characters ===
- Annabeth Chase: A demigod daughter of Athena, the Greek goddess of wisdom. Along with her boyfriend Percy, she is trapped in Tartarus during the novel.
- Frank Zhang: Son of Mars, the Roman god of war. He struggles with the voices of his father and Ares fighting in his head during most of the novel. After defeating all the katoblepones in Venice, he receives the blessing of Mars and peace from the arguing voices. He is dating Hazel Levesque. During the battle against the monsters in the Doors of Death, Jason Grace relinquishes his role as praetor of Camp Jupiter to Frank so that he can be of high enough rank to command an army of ghosts.
- Hazel Levesque: Demigod daughter of Pluto, the Roman god of the dead and riches. When Argo II was prevented from crossing the Apennines by Ourae, she met with Hecate, who showed her a northern path to travel, with the condition that Hazel would learn to use the Mist. At the Doors of Death, she uses the Mist against Pasiphaë, recreating the Labyrinth of Daedalus and throwing the sorceress into an imaginary abyss. She also defeats the giant Clytius with the help of Hecate.
- Jason Grace: Demigod son of Jupiter, the Roman aspect of Zeus. In an audition with Auster, the Roman deity of the South Wind, he reveals his preference for Camp Half-Blood instead of Camp Jupiter, and the god forces him to commit to his choice. During the battle against the monsters in the Doors of Death, Jason is unable to control the Diocletian's scepter because of his choice.
- Leo Valdez: Son of Hephaestus, the Greek god of fire and forges. After Khione and her siblings attack the Argo II, trireme built by Leo, he falls into Ogygia – he manages to escape with the help of Calypso after they fall in love. At the Doors of Death, he helps Hazel fight Pasiphaë and opens the door for Percy and Annabeth to return to the mortal world.
- Nico di Angelo: Demigod son of Hades, the Greek aspect of Pluto. Confronted by Cupid, he admits he had a crush on Percy and asks Jason to keep his secret. In Epirus, Nico leads the group to the Doors of Death. He works with Frank to summon and control the dead Roman legion against the cluster of monsters from Clytius. He and Hazel also use their ability to travel in the shadows to bring the group safely to the surface. Later he offered to take Athena Parthenos back to Camp Half-Blood with Reyna and Coach Hedge.
- Percy Jackson: Demigod son of Poseidon, who is also the main protagonist of the Percy Jackson & the Olympians series. He falls into Tartarus with his girlfriend Annabeth.
- Piper McLean: Daughter of Aphrodite. When Khione attacked Argo II, she rescued the rest of the crew after reactivating Festus (Leo's automaton dragon integrated with the ship) with her charmspeaking, which burned Calais and Zethes and allowed Piper to defeat the goddess.
- Reyna Avila Ramírez-Arellano: Demigod daughter of Bellona, the Roman goddess of war, is the praetor of Camp Jupiter. After she and the augur Octavian meet Rachel and Grover Underwood in New York City, Rachel gives her a message from Annabeth stating that Reyna was the only person able to take Athena Parthenos back to Camp Half-Blood and prevent the war between the Greeks and Romans. She agrees and goes to Greece on her pegasus, Scipio, in search of the other demigods, leaving Octavian in power. Upon finding them, she accepts the help of Nico and Coach Hedge to take the statue back to the United States using shadow travel.
- Iapetus/Bob the Titan: The Titan of the West and the father of Atlas, Iapetus was previously encountered by Percy, Annabeth, Nico and Thalia Grace in the short story Percy Jackson and the Sword of Hades where he had his memory erased by Percy throwing him into the River Lethe.

== Composition and marketing ==
The House of Hades was announced by Rick Riordan through his website on October 20, 2012, two weeks after the launching of The Mark of Athena, the third book in The Heroes of Olympus series. The cover and the synopsis were revealed at BookExpo America in May 2013. According to Riordan, the main focus of the plot would be on "Percy and Annabeth [being] plunged into the worst imaginable circumstances with no one to help them except each other – and how they deal with it."

In an interview with US News, Riordan said that to write the book, he used his experience of having traveled to the Mediterranean with his family as part of a Disney-Hyperion promotion for the end of the Percy Jackson & the Olympians. Many of the tourist destinations he visited were included in the series, but because of the conflicting portrayals of Tartarus in literature, the author said that he appealed to his imagination to write the scenes of the underworld.

To promote the book, a tour around the United States during the month of release was announced on August 8, 2013. The first chapter was released with the short story "The Son of Sobek" on June 8, 2013, and was made available for free download on Riordan's website on August 9, 2013. A video with Riordan reading a part of the first chapter of Annabeth Chase, one of the protagonists, was published in September. In the days prior to the launch, promotional images were released that revealed the characters Nyx and Cupid.

== Publication history ==
The House of Hades was released in the United States by Disney-Hyperion on October 8, 2013, with a first printing of two-and-a-half million copies. The audiobook (narrated by Nick Chamian) and ebook were made available on the same date. The book has been translated into 37 languages and distributed in 36 countries.

For the first printing, Disney-Hyperion offered different gifts that varied according to where the book was purchased: bumper stickers from Camp Half-Blood or Camp Jupiter at Walmart, a door hanger at Target and a full-color map of Tartarus at Barnes & Noble. A paperback edition containing the short stories "The Crown of Ptolemy" and "The Sword of Hades" was launched in the United States on March 31, 2015.

The House of Hades sold over 350,000 copies during the first week, 26% more than The Mark of Athena during a comparable period. Upon release, the book ranked No. 1 on The New York Times bestseller list, USA Today's bestseller list, The Globe and Mail bestseller list and The Wall Street Journal bestseller list, and was the seventh-bestselling book on Amazon and fifth in the Nielsen BookScan.

== Reception ==
The novel received positive reviews. A journalist of The Guardian praised Riordan's ability to handle the multiple-perspectives format smoothly and referred to his "subtle and effective" treatment of "more mature themes," including the revelation of Nico's sexual identity. According to the author, the sexual orientation of the character was not planned but developed during the writing of the books. He also commented that he had inserted a homosexual hero into his books because he had already taught gay and bisexual students, feeling that they deserved representation. He said that he viewed the idea of treating sexual identity as an adult topic as "absurd."

Karen Rought of Hypable considered The House of Hades as "one of the most gripping tales Riordan has written in his Percy Jackson world." She liked the development of the relationship between Percy and Annabeth during her journey in Tartarus and was surprised with the direction taken by some characters. Finally, she called it "the darkest book in the Heroes of Olympus series." Kirkus's analysis highlighted the portrayal of Tartarus as a "hellish, monster-infested landscape," as well as the development of the characters, making moments of jokes rarer.

Writing for Rappler.com, Gabriela Lee praised the writing as "fast-paced and efficient." She especially highlighted the scene in which Nico reveals himself to be gay, commenting: "there was nothing soft or comforting about their confrontation. Love was shown as something violent and frightening, and Nico's internal conflict unfolded without a hint of irony or disrespect." Lee was also surprised by the role given to Bob and confessed to having cried at the end given to the character. To close her analysis, she said: "The best lesson that one can take away from reading this book: that even the most terrible person can have a change of heart and make their own choices to do what is right."

The House of Hades won the Goodreads Choice Award for the Best Middle Grade and Children's Book of 2013.

== Sequel ==
On the same day as the release of The House of Hades, Rick Riordan announced its sequel, The Blood of Olympus, the last book of the series. The cover, featuring Jason, Frank, Hazel and two giants, was released on May 14, 2014. The first chapter of the story was released along with "The Staff of Serapis", a crossover between The Kane Chronicles and Percy Jackson & the Olympians. The Blood of Olympus was released on October 7, 2014, with a first printing of three million copies, and sold 162,000 copies in the first week.
