= Percy Jackson =

Character in the Camp Half-Blood Chronicles

- Camp Half-Blood Chronicles character
- First appearance: The Lightning Thief (2005)
- Last appearance: Wrath of the Triple Goddess (2024)
- Created by: Rick Riordan
- Portrayed by: Logan Lerman (films); Chris McCarrell (musical); Walker Scobell (TV)

In-universe information
- Full name: Perseus Jackson
- Nicknames: Percy; Seaweed Brain
- Species: Greek demigod
- Title(s): Son of Poseidon; Son of Neptune; Hero of Olympus
- Occupation: Demigod hero hunting/fighting monsters Praetor of the Twelfth Legion of Rome (formerly)
- Significant other: Annabeth Chase
- Relatives: Sally Jackson (mother); Poseidon (father); Paul Blofis (stepfather); Gabe Ugliano (former stepfather, deceased); Amphitrite (stepmother); Tyson (half-brother); Triton (half-brother); Estelle Blofis (half-sister)
- Nationality: American

Perseus "Percy" Jackson is a fictional character in the Camp Half-Blood Chronicles by Rick Riordan. He is the protagonist, the narrator, and the title character of the Percy Jackson & the Olympians series (2005–2009) and The Senior Year Adventures (2023–present), also serving as the narrator in the Demigods and Magicians collection.

== Creation and conception ==
Development of Percy Jackson began when Rick Riordan started inventing stories for his son Haley, who was diagnosed with ADHD and dyslexia, in the spring of 2002. When Haley was studying Greek mythology, he asked his father to tell him bedtime stories based on those myths. When his father ran out of ideas, Haley suggested that he make up new stories that combined existing mythological characters with new ones. This led Riordan to create the fictional character of Percy and the story of his travels across the United States to recover Zeus's lightning-bolt. Haley eventually suggested it be written as a novel. Riordan received input on the manuscript from some of his middle school students before taking the idea of Percy Jackson to a publisher.

Riordan has said that Percy Jackson's original character was "inspired by my son's own struggle" at school. Haley and Percy have been cited as the "same age" and share several character traits. Riordan has also stated that Percy has "[his] sense of humor" and is also "based on many of the students [he has] had in the past."

== Characterization ==
Percy Jackson is a demigod, the son of the mortal Sally Jackson and the Greek god Poseidon. He was diagnosed with ADHD and dyslexia, and demigods have an inherent capacity to read Ancient Greek and have inborn "battlefield reflexes". Percy's birthday is August 18, and in the first novel of Percy Jackson & the Olympians, The Lightning Thief, he is twelve years old.

Sally married Gabe Ugliano when Percy was young. At the end of The Lightning Thief, Percy's mother uses the severed head of Medusa to turn Gabe to stone. Between the time of The Battle of the Labyrinth and The Last Olympian, Sally marries Paul Blofis. Percy has a half-brother named Tyson, a Cyclops.

Percy's oldest friend is Grover Underwood, a satyr originally tasked with protecting him and bringing him safely to Camp Half-Blood. His next-oldest friend is Annabeth Chase, whom he first meets when she helps nurse him back to health after his first fight with the Minotaur in The Lightning Thief. The two accompany him on his first, and most of his subsequent, quests.

Percy's other friends include Thalia Grace, daughter of Zeus and leader of the Hunters of Artemis; Luke Castellan, son of Hermes; Nico di Angelo, son of Hades; Rachel Elizabeth Dare, a mortal Pythia; Hazel Levesque, daughter of Pluto; Leo Valdez, son of Hephaestus; Jason Grace, son of Jupiter; Piper McLean, daughter of Aphrodite; and Frank Zhang, son of Mars.

Percy's main weapon is Anaklusmos ("Riptide"), a sword made of celestial bronze given to him by Chiron, on the instructions of Poseidon. With his divine heritage as a demigod, he also has the capacity of reading Ancient Greek with greater capacity than with reading English.

== Actors ==
Logan Lerman (top) plays Percy in the films and Walker Scobell (bottom) plays him in the Disney+ series.

Percy Jackson is played by Logan Lerman in the film adaptations (2010, 2013), and by Walker Scobell in the Disney+ television adaptation (2023–present). In the stage musical adaptation, the role was originated by Eric Meyers in 2014 for its Off-Broadway premiere, Chris McCarrell for its 2019 Broadway production, and Max Harwood for its 2024 West End production.
