= Titans in popular culture =

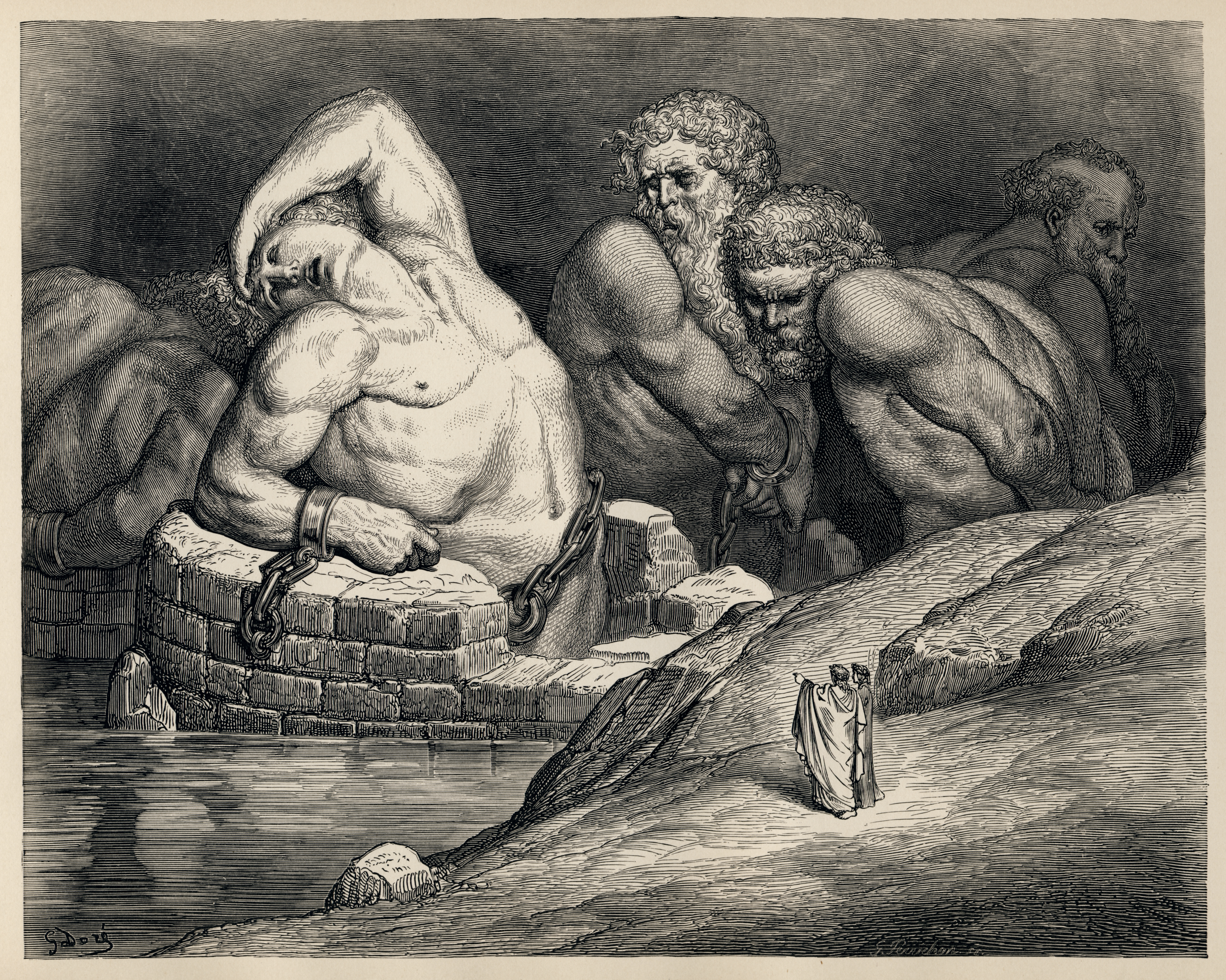
Gustave Doré's illustrations to Dante's Inferno, Plate LXV: Canto XXXI: The titans and giants

The familiar names and large sizes of the Titans have made them part of popular culture.

== General or collective references ==
- In the 2011 movie Immortals, starring Henry Cavill and Mickey Rourke, the Titans are imprisoned in Mount Tartarus until King Hyperion releases them using the Epirus Bow. The Titans resemble gods, but wear dark orange helmets and have rock-colored skin, and there are seemingly more that appear in the film than in actual mythology.
- In the 1997 Disney animated film Hercules there are five Titans, who bear little similarity to their mythological counterparts. Four of them, the Rock Titan, Ice Titan, Lava Titan, and Tornado Titan, embody the four classical elements, while a fifth Titan, the one-eyed Cyclops, is not associated with any element. They terrorize Earth until Zeus imprisons them; however, Hades later releases them to aid in his attempt to usurp Zeus . Later, in the animated series, the Titan Kronos is mentioned. The Disney versions of the Titans also appear in various games in the Disney-Square Enix video game franchise Kingdom Hearts.
- In the 1981 film Clash of the Titans, the Kraken, actually an entity from Norse mythology, is presented as "the last Titan". It also describes the usage of the head of Medusa, who is actually a Gorgon, to fight him, as "a titan against another titan". In the 2010 remake, the Titans are mentioned at the beginning, when it is claimed Hades created the Kraken to defeat them. Kronos appears in the sequel Wrath of the Titans, where Ares has turned to darkness and plans to revive his grandfather using Zeus' life force.
- The Italian sword-and-sandal film Arrivano i titani initially shows the Titans as prisoners in Tartarus, before they are latter liberated by Zeus to take down the megalomanic King Cadmus.
- The video game series God of War, which is based on Greek mythology, features many of the Titans, mainly Gaia, Cronos, and Atlas. They attempt to reignite their Great War with the Olympians with help from Spartan warrior Kratos, who became the God of War after killing Ares and sought vengeance against the Olympians after their king Zeus, later revealed to be his biological father, betrayed him. They serve as allies in God of War II, but become antagonists in God of War III following Gaia's betrayal.
- The Titans appear in the Charmed episode "Oh My Goddess", where Cronus, Demtrieus, and Meta battle the Charmed Ones, who are transformed into Goddesses, before being destroyed by Piper Halliwell.
- The Titans occasionally appear or are mentioned in Renaissance Pictures' Hercules/Xena franchise. In the Xena: Warrior Princess episode "The Titans," many Titans were turned to stone by the Olympians, which Crius, Hyperion and Theia seek to undo. In the Hercules: The Legendary Journeys episode "Let There Be Light," it is said that the Titans successfully defeated Dahak, but the battle left them too weak to resist the Olympians. In the Hercules series finale "Full Circle," Oceanus, Helios, and Atlas appear, having made a deal with Ares to destroy the Olympians but spare him.
- Titan appears as a regular Earth-based summon in the video game series Final Fantasy.
- The Titans are a race of Eternals (gods) in the Warcraft universe, depicted as tall figures with metallic-colored skin. They defeated the Old Gods, who originally ruled Azeroth long ago, before the invasion of the Burning Legion.
- In the tabletop game Warhammer 40,000, Titans are large war machines with destructive power, often referred to as "god-Machines" by Imperial forces due to being virtually unstoppable; generally, the only threat to a Titan on the battlefield is a Chaos Titan, or similar constructs created by other races.
- The largest class of combat vessels in the MMORPG Eve Online are classified as 'titans', and several of the Gallente faction vessels are named after Greek deities.
- In the series Percy Jackson and the Olympians, the Titans are the main villains, attempting to take over Mount Olympus and rule civilization once more after most of them were imprisoned in the Underworld.
- In DC Comics the Titans of Myth were exiled to another world after their defeat, which they called New Cronos, while Kronos was imprisoned in a tree. The Titans raised Donna Troy, also known as Troia, and gave her her powers.
- Titans are depicted in Dante Alighieri's Inferno.
- The tabletop roleplaying game Exalted features several titan-like Primordials who were usurped by the gods prior to the First Age.
- The NVIDIA GeForce Titan was released in 2013, and at the time was the most powerful GPU sold.
- In 2004, the Japanese automaker Nissan began production of a full-sized pickup truck for the North American market called the Titan.
- In Resident Evil Outbreak File #2, the giant zombie elephant rampaging throughout one scenario is called Titan.
- In the Dune series, created by Frank Herbert and continued by his son, Brian Herbert, a group of rebels calling themselves Titans conquer the Old Empire, with their reign being known as the Time of Titans.
- The Age of Empires spin-off, Age of Mythology, initially contained three civilizations and mythologies: The Norse, the Greeks, and the Egyptians. A later expansion added a fourth civilization, Atlantis, which worshipped the Titans. Titans are portrayed, as a whole, largely neutral, with some Titans even switching sides at some points in the game. There are three Major Titans that can be worshipped: Chronos, Gaia, and Ouranos. Gaia is shown generally as good and Chronos as evil, while Ouranos is mostly portrayed as a good force. Though Ouranos' followers are on the side of evil at one point, Ouranos is still the major god of the protagonists in one of the final battles.
- In the Brütal Legend video game, Titans are a race of benevolent creatures who invented music and left it for the modern world.
- In Dennou Boukenki Webdiver, the final giant robot, Ditalion, is based on a Titan.
- The primary antagonists in the anime and manga series Attack on Titan are called "Titans", and are depicted as a species of mindless giants that attack and eat humans on sight. In the series, the Titans were created from a race of people known as Subjects of Ymir, the only people capable of turning into Titans. Despite being referred to as Titans, their Japanese name, Kyojin, translates to Giant rather than Titan.
- In the manga Saint Seiya Episode.G, the Titans are villains, attempting to rule civilization once more, with Leo Aiolia and the Gold Saints being assigned to stop them.
- The video game Titan Quest tells the story of how the Telkine manage to cut off the gods from the mortal realms and attempt to free Typhon, identified in the game as a Titan, to have him assault Mount Olympus. The player is a Greek soldier who rises to the challenge and defends the world from the onslaught of mythological beasts and monsters.
- The video game franchise Borderlands features various references to the Titans throughout each installment in the series. In the story, four characters called Vault Hunters end up on a planet called Pandora to search for a mythical alien Vault, said to contain a cache of rare and powerful weapons, which the Atlas and Hyperion Corporations also seek to discover. The Hyperion Corporation builds a massive, H-shaped space station in Pandora's orbit called Helios on which a fair portion of gameplay takes place in the third game of the franchise, Borderlands: The Pre-Sequel. One of the playable characters in the game is a “gladiator” known as Athena, who is an ex-employee of the now non-existent Atlas Corporation.
- The video game Catacomb Abyss (1992) features a level called The Battleground of the Titans, with the two titan races being trolls and demons.
- In the MonsterVerse, Godzilla, King Kong and other kaiju are referred to as Titans. They are enormous animals that originate from inside the Hollow Earth, which they use to travel across the planet's surface to reclaim the world they once ruled, clashing with humanity.
- In the animated television series The Owl House, Titans are shown to be an enormous extinct canine species, with King Clawthorne, one of the show's main characters and a juvenile Titan, being the last of his kind. The Boiling Isles, where the series primarily takes place, is formed from the remains of a dead Titan, later revealed to be King's father. The Titans were wiped out following a battle between them and the Collector's race, whose magic they were able to nullify.
- The video game Hades, which is based on Greek mythology, features many references to the Titans, but the sequel, Hades II, actually features them, Hecate as the protagonist (Melinoe) headmistress and foster mother, Selene as one of Melinoe's allies, and Chronos as the final boss of the game; Chronos has traits of Cronus, as he is known as the Titan of Time.
- In Honkai: Star Rail, the Titans are a group of gods born from the Coreflames sent down by the gods of Amphoreus. Each Titan has an associated Coreflame, and whoever conquers the Coreflame's Trial could inherit the Titan's power and become the demigod. The Titans were responsible for the creations of the first heaven, earth, morals, and the calendar; following the fall of the Titans, and the Chrysos Heirs are prophesied to take up the Coreflames.

== Sports teams ==
- California State University, Fullerton Titans, a California State University.
- Gold Coast Titans, Australian rugby league team
- Newport Titans, a rugby league side who play out of Newport, South Wales.
- Titans cricket team, the Nashua Titans, a South African cricket team based in Centurion and Benoni
- Tennessee Titans, an American football team in the National Football League
- Titans of New York, former name of the New York Jets, an American football team in the National Football League
- New York Titans (lacrosse), a team in the National Lacrosse League
- Victoria Titans, former professional basketball team from Melbourne in the NBL
- Titan Robotics Club, International School, Bellevue, WA - FIRST Robotics Competition team #492

== Individual ==
=== Atlas ===
- In the God of War video game series, Atlas is encountered twice by protagonist Kratos. In the 2008 game Chains of Olympus, Atlas (voiced by Fred Tatasciore) is freed from his prison in Tartarus by Persephone in order to use Helios' power to destroy the Pillar of the World; Kratos destroys her and chains Atlas to the world, cursing him to hold it on his shoulders forever. In the 2007 game God of War II, while seeking The Sisters of Fate, Kratos is caught by Atlas (voiced by Michael Clarke Duncan) after falling down the Great Chasm battling Icarus. After breaking his chains, he attempts to kill Kratos, but is convinced to help him and helps him across the Great Chasm, wishing him luck and granting him the last of his magic, Atlas Quake.
- In Rick Riordan's The Titan's Curse of the Percy Jackson & the Olympians series, Atlas is the main antagonist. After being freed from the burden of the sky by tricking people into carrying it, near the end Percy and Artemis force him back under the Sky, though he kills his daughter, the nymph Zoe, in battle. He appears in The Last Olympian and tells the other Titans one of them should take his burden so he can fight, but is told that, due to his failure, Kronos is keeping him there.
- One of the models of Ford, Ford Atlas was named after the Titan.
- The Wizard Shazam gains stamina from Atlas, and grants it to Shazam.
- Atlas is the name of a weapons manufacturer in the video game Borderlands (2009) and sequel Borderlands 3 (2019).
- Atlas is featured in Smite as a playable guardian.

=== Coeus ===
- Coeus, as Koios, makes a brief appearance in The House of Hades, the penultimate book of The Heroes of Olympus. He speaks with his brother Iapetus, who he does not realize has abandoned the Titans and is now aiding and abetting their enemies. Koios claims that the Titans would eventually rule the cosmos once more, despite the fact that he and his brethren were defeated by the Olympians twice, and seems to feel disdain for his siblings, the Gigantes.

=== Crius ===
- He appears in Hercules and Xena – The Animated Movie: The Battle for Mount Olympus, where he is depicted as the Wind Titan.
- In episode 7 of Xena: Warrior Princess, The Titans, Crius is awoken by Gabrielle alongside Theia and Hyperion.
- Crius, as Krios, is the main hero in the 1962 sword-and-sandal film Arrivano I Titani.
- Crius, as Krios, briefly appears in the Percy Jackson and the Olympians book The Last Olympian. When the other Titans march to invade Manhattan, Krios is left behind to guard Mount Tamalpais, the location of the Titans' base, Othrys, named after their original home, Mount Othrys. While The Last Olympian does not reveal his fate, The Lost Hero, the first book of The Heroes of Olympus, the sequel series to Percy Jackson and the Olympians, reveals that Othrys was invaded by the Roman demigods of Camp Jupiter, and Krios was defeated by Jason Grace. Krios reappears in the fourth book, The House of Hades, where he and Hyperion are guarding the Doors of Death while he seeks revenge against Jason. In the end, his brother Iapetus, as Bob, tricks him into expressing doubts about serving their mother Gaea, and Krios and Hyperion are destroyed by Tartarus.

=== Cronus/Saturn ===
- In the Sailor Moon meta series, Sailor Saturn is one of the lead characters. Sailor Saturn's powers are mostly based on Roman mythology, in which Saturn is the god of the harvest. As such, her primary role is that of the destroyer, with her ultimate attack being the ability to destroy a planet in one move at the cost of her life.
- Appears in the God of War video game series, known as Cronos. In the 2005 game God of War, he is featured roaming the Desert of Lost Souls with Pandora's Temple, which holds Pandora's Box, chained to his back as punishment for his role in the Great War. In the 2007 game God of War II, Cronos (voiced by Lloyd Sherr) is featured in flashbacks showing when he devoured his children, and it is revealed that he had offered The Sisters of Fate the Steeds of Time in an attempt to change his fate, storing his magic, "Cronos's Rage", in the Steeds. In the 2010 game God of War III, it is shown that Cronos (voiced by George Ball) was banished to Tartarus since protagonist Kratos was able to conquer the temple chained to his back. He is then confronted as a boss that Kratos kills.
- In John C. Wright's Chronicles of Chaos, the world the children are in is the world of Saturn; although they differ in what story they know about the origin of the world, all agree that Saturn created it.
- In Rick Riordan's Percy Jackson & the Olympians, Kronos is the main antagonist. In The Last Olympian, he possesses Hermes's demigod son Luke Castellan as the leader of the Titan attack on Mount Olympus with an army of monsters. However, with Percy's help, Luke is able to regain enough control to kill himself and stop Kronos.
- In the animated series Class of the Titans, Cronus is the main antagonist, voiced by David Kaye. After he escapes from his 4,000-year imprisonment and seeks revenge, the main characters have to send him back to Tartarus.
- In an episode of Samurai Jack, the story of Cronus and the Titans and their fall plays a central role. A swamp hermit (actually a disguised Aku) has Jack collect three gems that once belonged to Cronus and were hidden by Zeus on Earth after he defeated and stripped his father of his powers; the Eye of Cronus, housed in a helmet, which allowed Cronus to focus his vision of universal time, and the Fists of Might and Ability, each housed in gauntlets, which allowed Cronus to grasp and tool the cosmic essence. Jack collects the three gems believing they can return him to his proper time. As the hermit, Aku uses them to create a monster to destroy Jack; however, Jack knew of Aku's deception and secretly removed the Eye of Cronus from Cronus' helmet, destabilizing the monster's body and causing it to fall apart. Backed into a corner, Aku tries to use the remaining gems contained in Cronus' gauntlets to destroy Jack, but he destroys them with his sword, forcing Aku to flee as Jack reclaims the Eye of Cronus.
- In Uchu Sentai Kyuranger, Don Armage is based on Cronus/Saturn.
- In the video game Hades II, Chronos is the main antagonist, voiced by Logan Cunningham. He returns from imprisonment in Tartarus and seek revenge upon his offspring and all Olympus.

=== Eos/Aurora ===
- In The Awakening of Flora, Aurora consoles Flora with the news that Apollo will soon herald the day.
- Eos appears in the 2008 game God of War: Chains of Olympus. She informs Kratos that he must seek out the Primordial Fires to awaken the Fire Steeds which will find her brother Helios in the Underworld. Kratos also acquires her magic, the Light of Dawn. In the 2010 game God of War III, she is referenced with a level called the Path of Eos.
- In John Milton's L'Allegro, Aurora is described as a possible mother of Euphrosyne.

=== Epimetheus ===
- Appears in the 2010 video game God of War III as one of the Titans in the assault on Mount Olympus. He is killed when Poseidon dives off Mount Olympus and through his chest, sending him off the mountain.

=== Hecate ===
- Hecate appears in Haley Riordan's short story The Son of Magic. She helps her demigod son Alabaster C. Torrington and the mortal Howard Claymore against her daughter Lamia. She reappears in Rick Riordan's novel The House of Hades, the penultimate book of The Heroes of Olympus series, where she helps Hazel Levesque, a demigod child of Pluto, defeat her Gigante foe Clytius.
- In the video game Hades II, Hecate, voiced by Amelia Tyler, is the headmistress and foster mother of the protagonist, Melinoe. She teaches and aids her to defeat the game's main antagonist, Chronos.

=== Helios ===
- In John C. Wright's The Golden Age, Helion has controlled the sun to prevent sunspots and other disruptive solar activities.
- In John C. Wright's Chronicles of Chaos, Helios is the father of Amelia/Phaetheusa, the narrator.
- Helios appears in Gareth Hinds' 2010 version of The Odyssey.
- Helios appears in 2018's The Burning Maze in The Trials of Apollo series by Rick Riordan.
- Helios appears three times in the God of War video game series as the Sun God. He appears at the end of the 2007 game God of War II with fellow gods Hades, Poseidon, and Hermes as they are being urged to unite by Zeus to destroy Kratos. In the 2008 game God of War: Chains of Olympus, Helios (voiced by Dwight Schultz) is kidnapped by Atlas on behalf of Persephone so that they can use his power to destroy the Pillar of the World. The plan is thwarted by Kratos, who rescues Helios, and he returns to the sky. His shield is also acquired for use in the game. In the 2010 game God of War III, which continues where God of War II ended, with the Titans climbing Mount Olympus, Helios (voiced by Crispin Freeman) is the first to jump to battle, calling his chariot and jumping into it. He is later encountered by Kratos battling Perses in Olympia, but is defeated when Kratos fires a ballista at the chariot, which crashes into Perses' hand and thrown across the city. Kratos then pulls the Head of Helios from the Titan's shoulders, using it to show hidden secrets during his quest. His death causes the sun to be blocked by dark rain clouds. Helios also appears in the tie-in comic series (2010–11), where he enters into a wager with five other Olympian gods, who each choose a champion to search for the Ambrosia of Asclepius, an elixir with magical healing properties.
- In the Wii game Metroid Prime 3: Corruption, the second Seed guardian is named after Helios.
- In the 2010 anime movie Metal Fight Beyblade vs the Sun: Sol Blaze, the Scorching Hot Invader, one of the antagonist characters is named after Helios, chosen to wield the Sun God Beyblade, Sol Blaze, in order to revive Atlantis.
- Helios appears on the cover of 2011's Floral Shoppe by Vektroid under the alias Macintosh Plus

=== Hyperion ===
- Appears in the 2008 game God of War: Chains of Olympus as a Titan chained in the pits of Tartarus. He is also referenced throughout the God of War series, such as the Hyperion Gate and the Stone of Hyperion.
- Marvel Comics features four Hyperions, two villains and two heroes from alternate universes.
- In Rick Riordan's The Last Olympian, Percy Jackson uses his powers over the sea to fight Hyperion, who is imprisoned in a tree by a combined group of satyrs and dryads. The House of Hades, the penultimate book of The Heroes of Olympus, reveals that Hyperion was sent back to Tartarus, guarding the Doors of Death with his brother Krios. He is clearly fearful of the primordial god Tartarus, warning his brothers not to upset him. In the end, he and Krios are destroyed by the personification of the abyss itself.
- In Tarsem Singh's film Immortals, Hyperion, portrayed by Mickey Rourke, is a king who declares war on humanity and leads his army on a rampage across Greece in search of the Epirus Bow in order to free the Titans and destroy the Gods and mankind.
- In StarCraft II: Wings of Liberty, Hyperion is the name of the Battlecruiser that Jim Raynor's rebellious forces command in the game. Originally, Dominion's capital ship, Raynor and his group hijacked it, and Dominion replaced it with a larger, stronger capital ship.
- Name of a weapons manufacturer in the Borderlands video game series.
- In episode 7 of Xena: Warrior Princess, "The Titans", Hyperion is awoken by Gabrielle alongside Theia and Crius.

=== Iapetus ===
- In Rick Riordan's short story The Sword of Hades, Iapetus is the main antagonist. With the help of the goddess Nemesis's demigod son Ethan Nakamura, he steals his nephew Hades' sword, a creation of the goddess Persephone. Iapetus is stopped by the combined force of Thalia Grace, Percy Jackson, and Nico di Angelo - children of the Big Three gods Zeus, Poseidon, and Hades. In a struggle, Percy knocks Iapetus into the River Lethe, destroying his memory, after which he becomes known as Bob, an ally of the Olympians. Bob returns in the penultimate book of The Heroes of Olympus, The House of Hades, as a major protagonist. He helps Percy and Annabeth Chase escape from the depths of Tartarus before sacrificing himself to ensure an Olympian victory in the second Gigantomachy.

=== Mnemosyne ===
- In the science fiction novel "City at the End of Time" by Greg Bear, Memnosyne plays a major, if largely invisible role in the plot, having created the protagonists Ginny, Jack and Daniel in order to restore her to her full power and save the future of the multiverse.
- In “Matrix: Resurrections”, there is a hovercraft named Mnemosyne.
- In "Sailor Moon Sailor Stars," the Sailor Senshi Sailor Mnemosyne and her twin, Sailor Lethe, are members of Shadow Galactica. Like her mythological counterpart, she is associated with memory.
- In Hercules and Xena – The Animated Movie: The Battle for Mount Olympus, Mnemosyne is re-imagined as the vicious Titaness of Fire, who seems to be romantically involved with the Wind Titan Crius. She is still associated with memory, however, as in the Xena: Warrior Princess episode "Forget Me Not" (Season 3, Episode 14), the character Gabrielle goes to the temple of Mnemosyne to try and forget her painful memories. In Hercules: The Legendary Journeys, Episode 91, "Let there be Light", Hercules visits Mnemosyne in person. This depiction combines elements of the other two depictions in the metaseries, as Mnemosyne is depicted as the fiery daughter of Cronos and an enemy of Zeus. Though angry and hostile towards Zeus, and by extension Hercules, she provides the latter with the information he seeks, courtesy of her long memory.
- In Xanadu, Mnemosyne is the unnamed mother of the Nine Muses, including Kira, the heroine.
- Mnemosyne is the name of a computer software project that helps people to memorize facts, such as school exams, as well as build data on memory research.
- In the MMORPG Asheron's Call, green triangular devices called Mnemosynes are used to store large amounts of knowledge/history and pass this information across generations.
- In the Oliver Stone ABC made-for-TV events miniseries Wild Palms, about a Cyber Cult, "Mnemosyne" was a vision inducing blue fluid.
- In Mass Effect 2, a mission takes place aboard a derelict ship orbiting around a Brown Dwarf named Mnemosyne.
- In the anime Rin - Daughters of Mnemosyne, the Time Spores that make women immortal also absorb their memories and anyone else's they pass through before depositing it back into Yggdrasil, the Tree of all Life.
- In La-Mulana 2, a ghost that relates part of the history of the 2nd Children, who were giants, is identified as "Mnemosyne's Remains".
- Bob Dylan's Rough and Rowdy Ways includes the song "Mother of Muses."

=== Oceanus ===
- Oceanus appears in the 2010 video game God of War III as one of the Titans in the assault on Mount Olympus, but is pulled off the mountain by Hades. He was originally to appear in the 2007 video game God of War II, but was cut during development.
- Oceanus appears in the book The Last Olympian and fights against Poseidon to prevent him from helping the Gods against Typhon while the Titans attack Olympus. After the Titans are defeated, he sinks into the ocean.
- In Hades II, one of the levels that Melinoe has to travel through is named after Oceanus.

=== Perses ===
- Perses appears in the 2010 video game God of War III, depicted as a massive brute made of rock and molten lava. As Kratos is ascending the Chain of Balance, Perses attacks him, possibly avenging Gaia, who Kratos had cast off Olympus, but is stabbed in the eye with the Blade of Olympus, sending him falling off.
- In the manga Medaka Box, the heroine Medaka entered a berserk state nicknamed Perses Mode.

=== Prometheus ===
- Prometheus is a supervillain in the DC Universe, who is an enemy of the Justice League. He stated that he named himself Prometheus because he "wanted to take fire from the Gods themselves. Steal their knowledge and techniques and use them against them", the "Gods" being anyone who is just using stolen money to purchase advanced weaponry.
- In Rick Riordan's The Last Olympian, Prometheus has joined the Titans, seemingly serving as their ambassador. He gives Percy Jackson Pandora's pithos and tries to convince Percy to open the lid and surrender.
- In the 2007 video game God of War II, Prometheus (voiced by Alan Oppenheimer) is featured, chained up and an eagle eats him alive, only for him to be brought back to life every morning. Kratos frees Prometheus by self-immolation in fire and gains the ability "Rage of the Titans" from Prometheus's ashes.
- In the American TV series Supernatural, Prometheus has escaped from his prison and is found by Sam and Dean Winchester, the show's protagonists, who help him attempt to break his curse of dying each day and coming back to life, which his son also suffers from. In the end, Prometheus kills Zeus and breaks the curse on himself and his son, but dies in the process.
- In the video game Hades II, Prometheus (voiced by Ben Starr) appears as the boss encounter of the Mount Olympus region. When Chronos launched his war against the Gods, Prometheus foresaw his victory and allied with him.

=== Rhea ===
- Appears in the 2007 game God of War II in a flashback. She is shown preventing her son Zeus from being devoured by her husband Cronos.
- Rhea is humorously mentioned in The Lightning Thief as the mother of Zeus and Poseidon and a subject of their frequent fights. She is later referenced in the short story The Diary of Luke Castellan. The characters Luke Castellan and Thalia Grace restate the myth of Rhea's preventing Zeus from being devoured by her husband Kronos.
- Rhea is one of the major characters of Fire Emblem: Three Houses, being the current leader and archbishop of the religious organization Church of Seiros.

=== Selene ===
- "Selene" ranked as the 987th most popular female first name for babies born in 2006 in the United States.
- "Selene" is the name of the moon's colony city in Einhander.
- In the young adult series, Daughters of the Moon, the daughters worshipped Selene, who gave them their powers and their reason for fighting the Atrox.
- In the Disney Channel Original Movie, Zenon: Z3, Selene, known as "Selena", assigns Zenon with the task of evacuating the moon.
- Selene is a Marvel comic book villainess who is most often an antagonist of the X-Men and the Hellfire Club.
- The Sonata Arctica song "My Selene" is based on the myth of Selene and Endymion.
- Two songs by progressive rock group Gong, on the albums Camembert Electrique and Angel's Egg respectively, are called "Selene".
- Selena was the leader of the Moon Fae in Anne Bishop's Tir Alainn series. Her second form was a shadow hound.
- Selene was an evil sorceress in books 1-6 and 14 of the Wicca Series by Cate Tiernan.
- Selene is an alias for Lanfear in the fantasy series The Wheel of Time, by Robert Jordan. Lanfear's sigil is a number of stars and a crescent moon, and she has pale skin and black hair and wears silver and white. She is one of the strongest of the thirteen Forsaken and is in love with the reincarnation of Lews Therin Telamon, who was her lover in the Age of Legends.
- Selene is the name of a planet in the PlayStation game Colony Wars. It is located in the Draco system, which also contains the star Helios, and is referred to in the cutscene "Time To Strike".
- Selene is the name of the fictional protagonist from Underworld and Underworld: Evolution action films.
- Selene is one of the alternate names for certain characters in the anime Sailor Moon, namely Queen Serenity and Princess Serenity/Tsukino Usagi, who are loosely based upon the Greek myth.
- In the book Blood and Chocolate, the loup-garou are said to be descended from people blessed by Selene with the power to shape shift.
- John Keats's Endymion recounts Endymion's quest for this goddess, but she is known as "Cynthia", which is normally a title of Artemis.
- In the video game Hades II, Selene voiced by Sarah Grayson, is an ally of the protagonist, Melinoe, who she offer her boons to help in her fight against Chronos.

=== Tethys ===
- Tethys is a character in Greenwitch, in Susan Cooper's Dark is Rising series.
- She appears in the animated film Hercules and Xena – The Animated Movie: The Battle for Mount Olympus and is the most human looking of the Titans, appearing as a water elemental giantess with long hair. However, this version of her is ferocious and ruthless, at one point attempting to crush Aphrodite.
- Caitlin R. Kiernan introduced a white dream raven named Tethys, in her story "The Two Trees" (The Dreaming #43).
- The Yu-Gi-Oh! card Tethys, Goddess of Light is named after her.
- Tethys is a character in Fire Emblem: The Sacred Stones, who is a beautiful, charming, and flirtatious dancer.

=== Theia ===
- In The New Teen Titans, Theia attempts to take over the world before being destroyed in volume 2, issue 9 by her husband Hyperion's self-immolation.
- In episode 7 of Xena: Warrior Princess, "The Titans", Theia is awoken by Gabrielle alongside Crius and Hyperion.
