= Marius Clarén =

German voice actor and dialogue writer

- Born: December 21, 1978
- Occupations: Voice actor, Dialogue writer, Dialogue director, Radio play voice actor
- Known for: Voice acting roles, including John Connor in Terminator 2 and Spider-Man
- Children: Cosmo Clarén, Vicco Clarén, Carlo Clarén
- Relatives: Timo Clarén (brother)

Marius Clarén (born December 21, 1978), also Marius Götze-Clarén is a German voice actor, dialogue writer, dialogue director and Radio Play Voice Actor.

== Biography ==
Marius Clarén already took over as child his first voice acting jobs. His father had an Acting training, initially worked as a voice actor and then as culture editor at RIAS and the SFB. Likewise, his older brother Timo Clarén stood behind the microphone several times during his childhood.

His first appearance he had in Terminator 2: Judgment Day where he voiced John Connor played by Edward Furlong. His brother, Timo Götze-Clarén, also worked as a voice actor as a child, but later chose a different career In the original - radio play to Sam Raimi's Spider-Man film (in whose German dubbed version Clarén lent his voice to the main character) Clarén also acts as the narrator. – ISBN 3-89832-927-5. He has also read audio books - for example Töte deinen Boss (en.:Kill your boss) (with Nana Spier, ISBN 978-3-8371-2762-1) and Artemis (with Gabrielle Pietermann, ISBN 978-3-8371-4165-8)

His son Cosmo Clarén also works as a voice actor. Both had a joint appearance on The Boss Baby, in which Marius voiced the older version of the role of Cosmo. His second son Vicco Clarén and his third son Carlo Clarén are also voice actors.

== Texts (dubbed books) ==
- Wild Hogs (also synchronous direction)
- Bridget Jones's Diary
- Kim Possible
- Yu-Gi-Oh!
- 40 Days and 40 Nights
- How to Lose a Guy in 10 Days
- Red Planet
- Me, Myself & Irene
- 3000 Miles to Graceland
- American Wedding
- Down to You
- Jackass: The Movie
- Bolt

== Selected voice roles ==
Chris Klein

- 1999: American Pie ... Oz
- 1999: Election ... Paul Metzler
- 2001: Say It Isn't So ... Gilbert Noble
- 2001: American Pie 2 ... Oz
- 2006: American Dreamz ... William Williams
- 2018: The Flash ... Orlin Dwyer / Cicada

Jake Gyllenhaal

- 2004: The Day After Tomorrow ... Sam Hall
- 2005: Proof ... Hal
- 2005: Brokeback Mountain ... Jack Twist
- 2007: Zodiac ... Robert Greysmith
- 2008: Rendition ... Douglas Freeman
- 2010: Prince of Persia: The Sands of Time ... Prinz Dastan
- 2010: Love and Other Drugs ... Jamie Randall
- 2011: Source Code ... Colter Stevens
- 2012: End of Watch ... Officer Brian Taylor
- 2013: Prisoners ... Detective Loki
- 2014: Nightcrawler ... Louis Bloom
- 2015: Southpaw ... Billy Hope
- 2016: Nocturnal Animals ... Edward Sheffield/Tony Hastings
- 2019: Spider-Man: Far From Home ... Quentin Beck / Mysterio

James D'Arcy

- 2004: Exorcist: The Beginning ... Pater Francis
- 2005: An American Haunting ... Richard Powell
- 2007: Rise: Blood Hunter ... Bishop
- 2016: Gernika ... Henry
- 2017: Dunkirk ... Captain Winnant
- 2017: The Snowman ... Filip Becker

Joshua Jackson

- 1994: D2: The Mighty Ducks ... Charlie Conway
- 1996: D3: The Mighty Ducks ... Charlie Conway
- 2000: The Skulls ... Lucas "Luke" McNamara

Shawn Hatosy

- 1999: Witness Protection ... Sean Batton
- 2011: Street Kings 2: Motor City ... Det. Dan Sullivan

Tobey Maguire

- 1998: Fear and Loathing in Las Vegas ... Hitchhiker
- 1998: Pleasantville ... David
- 2000: Wonder Boys ... James Leer
- 2002: Spider-Man ... Peter Parker/Spider-Man
- 2003: Seabiscuit ... Red Pollard
- 2004: Spider-Man 2 ... Peter Parker/Spider-Man
- 2007: Spider-Man 3 ... Peter Parker/Spider-Man
- 2009: Brothers ... Sam Cahill
- 2013: The Great Gatsby ... Nick Carraway
- 2013: Labor Day ... Henry Wheeler/Narrator
- 2016: Pawn Sacrifice ... Bobby Fischer
- 2017: The Boss Baby ... Grown-Up Tim

=== Movies ===
- 1991: For Edward Furlong in Terminator 2: Judgment Day ... John Connor
- 1997: For Timothy Stack in The Brave Little Toaster Goes to Mars ... Lampy
- 1998: For Justin Nimmo in Power Rangers in Space ... Zhane
- 2000: For Elijah Wood in Chain of Fools ... Mikey
- 2000: For Shawn Wayans in Scary Movie ... Ray Wilkins
- 2000: For Gael García Bernal in Amores Perros – Von Hunden und Menschen ... Octavio
- 2001: For Shawn Wayans in Scary Movie 2 ... Ray Wilkins
- 2001: For Daniel Coscrove in Valentine ... Campbell
- 2003: For Edward Finlay in 2 Fast 2 Furious ... Agent Dunn
- 2003: For Rusty Jacobs in Once Upon a Time in America ... Max (young)
- 2003: For Jordan Bridges in Mona Lisa Smile ... Spencer
- 2004: For Bryce Johnson in Bring It On Again ... Greg
- 2006: For Daniel Sauli in The Pink Panther ... Producer
- 2007: For Billie Joe Armstrong in The Simpsons Movie ... Billie Joe Armstrong – Green Day
- 2007: For Matthew Gray Gubler in Alvin and the Chipmunks ... Simon Seville
- 2007: For Walter Lewis in 1408 ... Cashier
- 2008: For Drake Bell in Superhero Movie ... Rick Riker/ Dragonfly
- 2008: For Jérôme Commandeur in Welcome to the Sticks ... Inspector Lebic
- 2009: For Matthew Gray Gubler in Alvin and the Chipmunks 2 ... Simon Seville
- 2011: For Russell Peters in New Year's Eve ... Sunil
- 2012: For Kumail Nanjiani in The Five-Year Engagement ... Pakistani Cook
- 2013: For Ben Falcone in Identity Thief ... Tony
- 2013: For Ben Schwartz in Turbo ... Drifter
- 2014: For Han Soto in Need for Speed ... News producer
- 2014: For Taika Waititi in What We Do in the Shadows ... Viago
- 2015: For Andrew Scott in Spectre ... Max Denbigh
- 2016: For Kumail Nanjiani in Central Intelligence ... Jared
- 2017: For Taika Waititi in Thor: Ragnarok ... Korg
- 2019: For Taika Waititi in Avengers: Endgame ... Korg
- 2019: For Billy Eichner in The Lion King ... Timon
- 2019: For Will Forte in Good Boys ... Max’ Vater
- 2019: For James Ransone in It Chapter 2 ... Eddie Kaspbrak
- 2019: For Liran Nathan in Last Christmas ... Andy
- 2019: For Mark O'Brien in Marriage Story ... Carter
- 2019: For Shane Brady in Doctor Sleep as Magician
- 2020: For Andrew Scott in 1917 ... Lieutenant Leslie
- 2020: For Taika Waititi in Jojo Rabbit ... Adolf Hitler
- 2020: For Kumail Nanjiani in Dolittle ... Plimpton
- 2020: For Lee Majdoub in Sonic the Hedgehog ... Agent Stone

=== Series ===
- 1989–1996: For Masako Nozawa in Dragon Ball Z ... Son-Goten (teenager)
- 1997–2001: For Michael Shulman in Recess ... Buggy boy
- 1998–1999: For Eric Szmanda in The Net ... Jacob Resh/Sorcerer
- 1999: For Adam Zolotin in Storm of the Century ... Davey Hopewell
- 1999–2001: For Stephen Gately in Watership Down ... Blackavar
- 1999–2002: For Adam LaVorgna in 7th Heaven ... Robbie Palmer
- 1999–2003: For Masami Kikuchi in Digimon and Digimon 02 ... Joe Kido
- 1999–2003: For Caleb Ross in The Tribe ... Lex
- 2000: X-DuckX ... Geextah
- 2000/2001: For Charlie Weber in Buffy the Vampire Slayer ... Ben
- 2000–2005: For Hal Sparks in Queer as Folk ... Michael Novotny
- 2000–2016: For Eric Szmanda in CSI: Crime Scene Investigation ... Greg Sanders
- 2001: For Yūichi Nakamura in Yu-Gi-Oh! ... Rex Raptor
- 2001: For Eric Johnson in Smallville ... Whitney
- 2001–2005: For Freddy Rodríguez in Six Feet Under ... Frederico Diaz
- 2001: For Adrian Wenner in Scrubs als "Philip Chambers"
- 2003: For Mamoru Miyano in Wolf's Rain ... Kiba
- 2003–2007: For Will Friedle in Kim Possible ... Ron Stoppable
- 2004: W.I.T.C.H. ... Prinz Phobos
- 2004–2005: For Tomokazu Seki in Full Metal Panic! ... Sōsuke Sagara
- 2004–2006: For Michael Rosenbaum in Justice League Unlimited ... Wally West/The Flash
- 2004–2011: For Rex Lee in Entourage ... Lloyd Lee
- 2005–2006: For Danny Cooksey in Xiaolin Showdown ... Jack Spicer
- 2005–2009: For Shane West in ER ... Dr. Ray Barnett
- since 2005: For Sean Murray in Navy CIS ... Special Agent Timothy "Tim" McGee
- 2006–2008: For Michael Sinterniklaas in Kappa Mikey ... Michael “Mikey” Alexander Simon
- 2006–2009: For Gareth David-Lloyd in Torchwood ... Ianto Jones
- 2007: For Kanako Irie in Yu-Gi-Oh! GX ... Jesse Anderson
- 2008: Bibi and Tina ... Holger Martin
- 2008: For Josh Keaton in Spectacular Spider-Man ... Peter Parker/Spider-Man
- 2010–2017: For Pej Vahdat in Bones ... Arastoo Vaziri
- 2011–2014: For Eric Johnson in Rookie Blue ... Luke Callaghan
- 2011–2017: For Andrew Scott in Sherlock ... Jim Moriarty
- 2012–2017: For Matthew Moy in 2 Broke Girls ... Han Lee
- 2013–2014: For Seth Green in Dads ... Eli Sachs
- since 2013: For Andy Samberg in Brooklyn Nine-Nine ... Detective Jake Peralta
- 2014–2019: For Zach Woods in Silicon Valley ... Donald "Jared" Dunn
- 2015–2019: For Robin Lord Taylor in Gotham ... Oswald "Penguin" Cobblepot
- since 2017: For Weird Al Yankovic in Milo Murphy's Law as Milo Murphy
- 2017–2019: For Kahlil Ashanti in The Tick as Goat

=== Video games ===
- 2002: Aquanox 2: Revelation – "Stoney Fox"
- 2003: Star Wars Jedi Knight: Jedi Academy – "Rosh Penin"
- 2004: Spider-Man 2 – The Game ... Peter Parker/Spider-Man
- 2007: Spider-Man 3 – The Game ... Peter Parker/Spider-Man
- 2009: Simon the Sorcerer: Who'd Even Want Contact ... Captain Narrow
- 2011: Skylanders: Spyro's Adventure ... Spyro the Dragon
- 2012: Diablo 3 ... Wizard (male)
- 2012: Skylanders: Giants ... Spyro the Dragon
- 2014: Dragon Age: Inquisition – Cole
- 2017: Railway Empire – Cornelius Vanderbilt

=== Audio books ===
- Jodi Picoult: Das Herz ihrer Tochter (en. title: Change of Heart) (together with Jens Wawrczeck, Anna Thalbach, Tanja Geke and Felicia Wittmann), Der Hörverlag, ISBN 978-3867175166
- Andy Weir: Artemis (together with Gabrielle Pietermann), Random House Audio, ISBN 978-3-8371-4167-2
- Chris Rylander: Die Legende von Greg 1: Der krass katastrophale Anfang der ganzen Sache, (en. title: The Legend of Greg (An Epic Series of Failures)) Silberfisch, ISBN 9783745601190
- Anke Stelling: Freddie und die Bändigung des Bösen (en.: Freddie and the Taming of Evil), cbj audio (Random House Audio), ISBN 978-3837150551

Percy Jackson

- Percy Jackson 1 – Diebe im Olymp (Percy Jackson & the Olympians)
- Percy Jackson 2 – Im Bann des Zyklopen (Percy Jackson & the Olympians: The Sea of Monsters)
- Percy Jackson 3 – Fluch des Titanen (Percy Jackson & The Olympians: The Titan's Curse)
- Percy Jackson 4 – Schlacht um das Labyrinth (Percy Jackson & The Olympians: The Battle of the Labyrinth)
- Percy Jackson 5 – Die letzte Göttin (Percy Jackson & the Olympians: The Last Olympian)
- Percy Jackson erzählt: Griechische Göttersagen (Percy Jackson's Greek Gods)
- Percy Jackson erzählt: Griechische Heldensagen (Percy Jackson's Greek Heroes)

Helden des Olymp

- Helden des Olymp 1 – Der verschwundene Halbgott (The Heroes of Olympus: The Lost Hero)
- Helden des Olymp 2 – Der Sohn des Neptun (The Heroes of Olympus: The Son of Neptune)
- Helden des Olymp 3 – Das Zeichen der Athene (The Heroes of Olympus: The Mark of Athena)
- Helden des Olymp 4 – Das Haus des Hades (The Heroes of Olympus: The House of Hades)
- Helden des Olymp 5 – Das Blut des Olymp (The Heroes of Olympus: The Blood of Olympus)

Goblins

- Goblins 1 – Die Goblins (Goblin Quest)
- Goblins 2 – Die Rückkehr der Goblins (Goblin Hero)
- Goblins 3 – Der Krieg der Goblins (Goblin War)
- Goblins 4 – Der Goblin-Held (Goblin Tales)

Die Schattenwald-Geheimnisse

- Die Schattenwald-Geheimnisse 1 – Wald der tausend Augen (Sophie and the Shadow Woods: The Goblin King)
- Die Schattenwald-Geheimnisse 2 – Der Vergessene Ort (Sophie and the Shadow Woods: The Swamp Boggles)
- Die Schattenwald-Geheimnisse 3 – Gefährliche Verwandlung (Sophie and the Shadow Woods: The Spider Gnomes)
- Die Schattenwald-Geheimnisse 4 – Die Nebelkönigin (Sophie and the Shadow Woods: The Fog Boggarts)

Bibi & Tina

- Bibi & Tina 68 – Die Urlaubsüberraschung (en. translation: Bibi and Tina 68 - The Holiday Surprise)
- Bibi & Tina 79 – Rennpferd in Not (en. translation: Bibi and Tina 79 - Racehorse in Distress)

tschick
