= The Demigod Files =

2009 story collection by Rick Riordan

- First edition cover
- Author: Rick Riordan
- Series: Percy Jackson & the Olympians (companion)
- Genre: Young adult, Fantasy, Short story collection, Greek mythology
- Publisher: Disney Hyperion
- Publication date: February 10, 2009
- Publication place: United States
- Media type: Print (hardcover)
- Pages: 160 + 8 plates illus.
- ISBN: 1-4231-2166-X

The Demigod Files is a collection of short stories by Rick Riordan published on February 10, 2009. It is a supplementary book to series Percy Jackson & the Olympians. It mainly contains three short stories, titled "Percy Jackson and the Stolen Chariot", "Percy Jackson and the Bronze Dragon", and "Percy Jackson and the Sword of Hades". It is set between the fourth and fifth novels, The Battle of the Labyrinth and The Last Olympian.

Additional contents are a letter from the Camp Half-Blood scribe Rick Riordan, question-and-answer style "interviews" with some of the campers, and various activities such as a crossword puzzle, and a preview of The Last Olympian.

Antonio Caparo created the character designs.

== Stories ==
=== Percy Jackson and the Stolen Chariot ===
Percy Jackson saves Clarisse La Rue from feather-shooting birds in his school. After the fight, Clarisse reveals that, as part of a ritual for the children of Ares, she must bring the Ares war chariot back to his temple on the Intrepid, an aircraft carrier that has now become a museum, by sundown or she would be in trouble. However her immortal brothers, Phobos (representing fear) and Deimos (representing terror), the usual drivers and guardians of the chariot, have stolen it from Clarisse out of jealousy.

Percy offers his help, and Clarisse reluctantly accepts it. They meet the two gods at a zoo. They battle the two gods once they discover how to counter the terror or fear. They bring the chariot to Ares' Temple to the Intrepid. The story takes place in between The Battle of the Labyrinth and The Last Olympian.

=== Percy Jackson and the Bronze Dragon ===
Percy Jackson and Charles Beckendorf are on the same team for capture the flag. Beckendorf, a son of Hephaestus, suggests Percy to ask Annabeth, daughter of Athena, to the Fourth of July fireworks, the biggest dating event of the summer at Camp Half-Blood. During the game, he and Beckendorf try to sneak up to the enemy territory to find the flag. Instead, Percy gets caught by Annabeth and Silena Beauregard while Beckondorf finds the dreaded Myrmekes (giant, blood-red ants) carrying a bronze dragon head at the Ant Hill. Beckendorf, who believes this is a blessing from his father Hephaestus, runs up to get it and ends up getting captured.

Percy, Annabeth and Silena attempts to rescue Beckendorf. They decide to find and recreate the huge bronze dragon that was once one of Camp Half-Blood's defences. They eventually manage to make the dragon (an automaton) and get it to save Beckendorf. The dragon blasts open the ant nest, but gets attacked and ends up damaged. Percy, Annabeth and Silena find valuables after darting in the anthill. Once back at camp, they learn the games hasn't yet been finished. Annabeth forces the boys to stay in Capture the Flag prison while the girls go finish the game. Before resuming the games, Annabeth asks Percy to the fireworks.

The story takes place in between The Battle of the Labyrinth and The Last Olympian and has narrative connections to The Heroes of Olympus and The Trials of Apollo as the bronze dragon, renamed Festus, goes on to play a crucial role in future stories, as does the anthill encountered in the narrative.

=== Percy Jackson and the Sword of Hades ===
Rick Riordan wrote this short story for World Book Day 2009. It takes place between The Battle of the Labyrinth and The Last Olympian. It's part of the canon as a whole, as it has narrative connections to The House of Hades and The Sun and the Star where the memory-wiped Bob plays a crucial role in both books. In addition, the paperback version of The House of Hades contains a copy of the short story in the back.

Persephone calls Percy, Thalia and Nico, the children of the Big Three, into the Underworld to retrieve Hades' new sword from a demigod spy who stole it. Persephone gives them a magical flower to track the thief. Percy, Nico and Thalia must retrieve the sword before time runs out.

They track the thief, Ethan Nakamura, with the help of the flower. Issues arise when Ethan revives the Titan Iapetus using a special key in the sword. After a fight with the enemy, Percy flings Iapetus into the River Lethe, a river that erases memories. After being memory-wiped Iapetus is convinced by Percy that his name is Bob and that they are friends. When the three heroes and "Bob" return to Hades and Persephone with the sword, they learn that Persephone commissioned the sword against Hades' orders after seeing Hades in anger and threatening Persephone never to disobey him again.

== Camper interviews ==
The book contains fictional interviews with multiple characters at Camp Half-Blood including Percy Jackson, Annabeth Chase, Grover Underwood, the Stoll brothers Connor and Travis, and Clarisse La Rue.

== Critical reception ==
The book received mixed reviews. Publishers Weekly criticized it saying, "Bland illustrations depicting the contents of Annabeth's trunk, a map of Camp Half-Blood and a short 'sneak peek' at the book The Last Olympian pad the contents (barely) to book length; the inclusion of a crossword puzzle and a word search makes the book difficult to share. Not a must-read-but try telling that to rabid fans." School Library Journal reviewer Tim Wadham commended the writing, saying, "Despite the fact that this is more of a marketing package than anything else, the quality of and interest in the three stories likely justifies its purchase."

== See also ==
- Fantasy
- Greek gods
- Greek mythology
- Mount Olympus
- Mythology
- The Demigod Diaries
