= Titans of Myth =

Titans of Myth may refer to:

- Titan (mythology), one of a group of deities in ancient Greek mythology later overthrown by the Olympian gods
- Titans of Myth (comics), DC Comics characters based on the mythological Titans
