= The Demigod Diaries =

2012 short story collection by Rick Riordan and Haley Riordan

- First edition cover
- Authors: Rick Riordan, Haley Riordan
- Language: English
- Series: The Heroes of Olympus
- Genre: Young adult, Fantasy, Short story collection, Greek mythology
- Publisher: Disney Hyperion
- Publication date: August 14, 2012
- Publication place: United States
- Media type: Print (hardcover)
- Pages: 224
- ISBN: 1-4231-6300-1

The Demigod Diaries is a collection of short stories relating to The Heroes of Olympus book series.

== Summary ==
The Demigod Diaries contains four new stories, illustrations of Annabeth Chase, Percy Jackson, Jason Grace, Piper McLean, Leo Valdez, Luke Castellan and first ever seen pictures of Thalia Grace and Hal, a character that is introduced in the first story, puzzles, and a quiz. The four stories include:

- Thalia, Luke, and Annabeth's adventures before the Percy Jackson & the Olympians series began;
- A first-person narrative from Percy's viewpoint as he and Annabeth complete a task given by Hermes regarding his staff which happens a month after the end of The Last Olympian and before Percy went missing in The Lost Hero;
- A story involving Jason, Leo, and Piper during their time spent at Camp Half-Blood between The Lost Hero and The Mark of Athena.

It also includes a short story by Riordan's son, Haley Riordan, revolving around one of the demigods who fought for Kronos during the Second Titan War and survived the battle in Manhattan.

== Stories ==
=== The Diary of Luke Castellan ===
Set five years before the start of The Lightning Thief and narrated by Luke, this story follows him and his companion, Thalia. The two of them follow the goat Amaltheia to an abandoned house, only to get trapped inside by the living curtains and a trio of impervious Leucrotae who have the ability to mimic sound and voices. They meet the house's sole occupant, Halcyon "Hal" Green, a prophetic, desolate demigod son of Apollo. Hal was imprisoned due to using his powers to save a girl. His ability to speak is taken away with his only way of communicating being the Leucrotae themselves and by writing his words down. The Leucrotae are held off by a gate that will open at 7:00 and devour the children. In the meantime, Hal uses his abilities to predict the children's futures. Thalia will die, but live on afterwards (as seen in The Sea of Monsters and The Titan's Curse), while Luke will be involved in some kind of betrayal (as seen in The Lightning Thief), though he misinterprets this as being someone will betray him.

Hal reveals that his closet is full of hidden treasures, one of which is a chest that cannot be opened. Luke and Thalia manage to do so and find a silver bracelet inside. Hal realizes that they were destined to come to the house and "free" him. Hal gives Luke his diary as well as a dagger while Thalia creates Roman fire, the only thing that can kill the Leucrotae. Hal sacrifices himself and kills two of the creatures while the third one attacks Luke. However, Thalia manages to summon a shield from the bracelet that scares the final Leucrotae into being devoured by the curtains. The house explodes, but Luke and Thalia escape before police and paramedics arrive. The two later find young Annabeth and decide to take her into their group with Luke giving her the dagger Hal gave him.

=== Percy Jackson and the Staff of Hermes ===
Set a month after the end of The Last Olympian, before Percy and Jason's switch by Hera and narrated by Percy, the story follows Percy and Annabeth as their date is interrupted by Hermes. His staff, the caduceus, has been stolen while he was delivering a package to Janus. However, Hermes knows who the thief is: the fire breathing giant Cacus. Percy agrees to the quest on the condition that Hermes do something for him. Percy and Annabeth manage to locate Cacus to the sewers where he admits to the theft, though it is implied that stealing it was not his idea.

Percy and Annabeth fight Cacus up to the surface where Percy tricks him into dropping the caduceus while Annabeth uses a construction crane to pick him up and fling him away. Percy has the staff transform into a laser and he blows up Cacus in mid air. Percy and Annabeth return the staff to Hermes who implies that the theft of his staff was due to something far more sinister, but he tells the two to not worry about it. Hermes then fulfills his promise to Percy, sending him and Annabeth to celebrate their one-month anniversary in Paris, France.

=== Leo Valdez and the Quest for Buford ===
Set between the events of The Lost Hero and The Son of Neptune and narrated by Leo, the story follows him in the process of trying to build the Argo II. He is missing the syncopator needed to help the engine run smoothly. Upon his friends Jason and Piper coming to check on him, he reveals that due to the misplaced syncopator, the Argo II is in danger of exploding in one hour. The part, and its backup, are within an animated drawer named Buford who ran away after Leo accidentally wiped him down with Windex instead of Pledge. The trio agree to go into the woods to find Buford.

While chasing Buford in the woods, Leo, Jason, and Piper immediately come into conflict with the maenads, the maniac followers of Dionysus, the god of Wine. They deduce that Leo is not Dionysus and chase after the three. Knowing that they cannot kill them, as that would risk Dionysus cursing them, Jason chases after Buford while Leo and Piper lead the maenads back to Bunker 9 and use Hephaestus' golden cage to entrap them. Jason returns with Buford and Leo is able to insert the syncopator with only seconds to spare. The rest of Hephaestus Cabin celebrate Argo II's completion while Chiron and Argus ship the maenads to Atlantic City.

=== The Son of Magic ===
This story was written by Rick Riordan's son Haley (on whom Percy Jackson is based) and marked his debut as a professional writer. It is set sometime after the events of The Last Olympian and told in the limited, subjective third-person. Dr. Howard Claymore is a middle-aged expert philosopher who has a cynical view on life. He encounters a teenage boy named Alabaster Torrington who is curious about death, but he blows him off. Later, he is greeted by Ms. Lamia, who had recently set up one of his speeches, but learns too late that she is, in fact, the daughter of Hecate who is after Alabaster, her brother. Following Lamia destroying Claymore's favorite coffee place, killing his only friend in the process, Claymore seeks out Alabaster.

Alabaster reveals that he fought for Kronos in the Titan War the previous summer, and lead many of his siblings to their death. Hecate reluctantly agreed to rejoin the other gods on the condition that her only living demigod child, Alabaster, be sacrificed. This led to Lamia, who is now working for Gaea and preventing her from going to Tartarus, to come after him. Alabaster and Claymore discover a way to kill Lamia using a spell and manage to find it. However, Lamia catches Claymore who sacrifices himself to save the demigod. Claymore ends up meeting Hecate who managed to separate her children and sends Claymore back as a Mistform (a non-living being), to watch over Alabaster. The two reunite to continue their research.

== Release ==
The Demigod Diaries was released on August 14, 2012.

== See also ==
- The Heroes of Olympus
- The Demigod Files
