= Gabrielle Pietermann =

German voice actress

Gabrielle Pietermann (born September 2, 1987 in Munich) is a German voice actress and Audiobook-Narrator. She is most famous for being the German dub-over artist of actresses Emma Watson, Selena Gomez, Anna Kendrick, Danielle Campbell, Meaghan Jette Martin, Emilia Clarke and for the German Voice as Tinker Bell for Mae Whitman. And in 2017 an audiobook publisher named der Hörverlag released a Novelization of Beauty and the Beast (1991 film) read by Gabrielle Pietermann (ISBN 978-3-8445-2501-4).

== Notable voice roles ==
Emma Watson:

as Hermione Granger (Hermine Granger) in:

- 2001: Harry Potter and the Philosopher's Stone (Harry Potter und der Stein der Weisen)
- 2002: Harry Potter and the Chamber of Secrets (Harry Potter und die Kammer des Schreckens)
- 2004: Harry Potter and the Prisoner of Azkaban (Harry Potter und der Gefangene von Askaban)
- 2005: Harry Potter and the Goblet of Fire (Harry Potter und der Feuerkelch)
- 2007: Harry Potter and the Order of the Phoenix (Harry Potter und der Orden des Phönix)
- 2009: Harry Potter and the Half-Blood Prince (Harry Potter und der Halbblutprinz)
- 2010: Harry Potter and the Deathly Hallows – Part 1 (Harry Potter und die Heligtümer des Todes - Teil 1)
- 2011: Harry Potter and the Deathly Hallows – Part 2 (Harry Potter und die Heiligtümer des Todes - Teil 2]

- 2007: as Pauline in: Ballet Shoes (Ballet Shoes)
- 2011: as Lucy in My Week with Marilyn (My Week with Marilyn)
- 2012: as Sam in The Perks of Being a Wallflower (Vielleicht lieber Morgen)
- 2013: as Emma Watson in This Is the End (Das ist das Ende)
- 2013: as Nicki The Bling Ring (The Bling Ring)
- 2017: as Belle in Beauty and the Beast (2017 film) - German: Die Schöne und das Biest (German singing voice: Julia Milena Scheeser)

Selena Gomez:

as Alex Russo in:

- 2007-2012: Wizards of Waverly Place (Die Zauberer vom Waverly Place)
- 2009: Wizards of Waverly Place: The Movie (Die Zauberer vom Waverly Place - Der Film)
- 2013: The Wizards Return: Alex vs. Alex (Die Rückkehr der Zauberer vom Waverly Place)

- 2009: as Carter in Princess Protection Program (Prinzessinen Schutzprogramm)
- 2009: as Selena Gomez in Sonny With a Chance (Sonny Munroe)
- 2009: as Selena Gomez in Studio Disney Channel - Almost Live (Studio Disney Channel - Beinah Live)
- 2010: as Beezus in Ramona and Beezus (Schwesterherzen - Ramonas wilde Welt)
- 2011: as Grace/Cordelia in Monte Carlo (Plötzlich Star)
- 2012: as Faith in Spring Breakers (Spring Breakers)
- 2013: as The Kid in Getaway (Getaway)

Anna Kendrick:

as Jessica Stanley in:

- 2008: Twilight (Twilight - Bis(s) zum Morgengrauen)
- 2009: The Twilight Saga: New Moon (New Moon - Bis(s) zur Mittagsstunde)
- 2010: The Twilight Saga: Eclipse(Eclipse - Bis(s) zum Abendrot)

Meaghan Jette Martin:

as Tess Tyler in:

- 2008: Camp Rock (Camp Rock)
- 2010: Camp Rock 2: The Final Jam (Camp Rock 2: The Final Jam)
- 2011: as Bianca Stratford in 10 Things I Hate About You (10 Dinge die ich an dir hasse)

Danielle Campbell:

- 2010: as Jessica Olson in StarStruck (StarStruck - Der Star der mich liebte)
- 2010: as Dani in Zeke and Luther ( Zeke & Luther)
- 2011: as Simone Daniles in Prom (Prom - Die Nacht deines Lebens)

Mae Whitman:

as the Voice of Tinker Bell in:

- 2008: Tinker Bell (Tinker Bell)
- 2009: Tinker Bell and the Lost Treasure (Tinkerbell 2 - Die Suche nach dem verlorenen Schatz)
- 2010: Tinker Bell and the Great Fairy Rescue (Tinkerbell 3 - Ein Sommer voller Abenteuer)
- 2012: Secret of the Wings (Tinkerbell 4 - Das Geheimnis der Feenflügel)

Others:

Jamie Lynn Spears:

- 2004-2008: as Zoey Brooks in Zoey 101 (Zoey 101)

Emilia Clarke:

- 2011–present: as Daenerys Targaryen in Game of Thrones (Game of Thrones)

Gillian Zinser:

- 2011–present: as Ivy Sullivan in 90210 (90210)

Allison Miller:

- 2009: as young Scarlett O'Donnell in 17 Again (17 Again - Back to High School)

Nicola Peltz

- 2010: as Katara in The Last Airbender (Die Legende von Aang)

Anneliese van der Pol:

- 2010: as Jennifer in Vampires Suck (Beilight - Bis(s) zum Abendbrot)

Molly Ephraim:

- 2010: as Ali in Paranormal Activity 2 (Paranormal Activity 2)

Tamzin Merchant:

- 2010: as Catherine Howard in The Tudors (Die Tudors)

Sarah Jeffery as Audrey in:

- Descendants (Descendants - Die Nachkommen)
- Descendants: Wicked World (Descendants - Verhexte Welt)
- Descendants 3 (Descendants 3 - Die Nachkommen)

== Audiobooks (excerpt) ==
- 2009: Jungs zum Anbeissen by Mari Mancusi (Publisher: Arena Audio) – ISBN 978-3-401-26714-2
- 2010: Einmal gebissen, total hingerissen by Mari Mancusi (Publisher: Arena Audio) – ISBN 978-3-401-26546-9
- 2010: Dork Diaries, Nikkis (nicht ganz so) fabelhafte Welt by Rachel Renee Russell (Publisher: Der Audio Verlag) – ISBN 978-3-505-12860-8
- 2010: Krippenspiel mit Zuckerguss by Sabine Both (Publisher: Silberfisch) – ISBN 978-3-86742-205-5
- 2010: Drei Küsse zum Dinner by Sabine Both (Publisher: Silberfisch) – ISBN 978-3-86742-206-2
- 2011: Dork Diaries, Nikkis (nicht ganz so) glamouröses Partyleben by Rachel Renee Russell (Publisher: Der Audio Verlag) – ISBN 978-3-505-12861-5
- 2012: Dork Diaries, Nikkis (nicht ganz so) phänomenaler Auftritt by Rachel Renee Russel (Publisher: Der Audio Verlag) – ISBN 978-3-505-12862-2
- 2013: Mädchen sind die besseren Spione by Ally Carter (Publisher: Silberfisch) – ISBN 978-3-86742-233-8
- 2015: Elias & Laia: Die Herrschaft der Masken by Sabaa Tahir (together with Max Felder), Publisher: Lübbe Audio, ISBN 978-3785750810
- 2017: Die Schöne und das Biest - (Disneys Beauty and the Beast Novelization (Publisher: der Hörverlag) – ISBN 978-3-8445-2501-4
- 2018: Artemis by Andy Weir (together with Marius Clarén), Random House Audio, ISBN 978-3837141658 (Unabridged: Audible)
- 2021: Emma Scott: BE MY TOMORROW (Audiobook-Download, part 1 of the series "Only Love", together with Sebastian Fitzner), publisher: Lübbe Audio
