= Titans of Myth (comics) =

Fictional deities

- Cover of The New Teen Titans, vol. 1, #12 (Oct 1981), art by George Pérez, pencils, and Dick Giordano, inks.

Publication information
- Publisher: DC Comics
- First appearance: The New Teen Titans #11 (September 1981)
- Created by: Marv Wolfman; George Pérez

Characteristics
- Pantheon: Greco-Roman

The Titans of Myth are mythological deities who appear in the Teen Titans and Wonder Woman comic book series by DC Comics.

== History ==
=== Pre-Crisis ===
The Teen Titans of the 1960s and 1970s were revived in a new series called The New Teen Titans in November 1980. Hyperion — one of the Titans of Myth — frees himself from imprisonment and bewitches the Teen Titan Wonder Girl (Donna Troy) (herself tied to the mythological Amazons as the adopted sister of Wonder Woman) and makes her fall in love with him. He releases his fellow Titans, and Wonder Girl joins them in their assault upon the Olympian Gods.

It is explained that Gaia (Mother Earth) had fallen in love with Uranus (Father Sky) and had given birth to the 12 Titans of Myth: Iapetus and Themis, Titans of Justice; Crius and Mnemosyne, Titans of Memory; Coeus and Phoebe, Titans of the Moon; Hyperion and Thia, Titans of the Sun; Oceanus and Tethys, Titans of the Sea; and Cronus and Rhia, Titans of the Earth. The Titans had been beautiful godlike beings, but the rest of Gaia and Uranus's children had been horrible monsters banished by Uranus to the pits of Tartarus. Hoping to free all of her children, Gaia had given Cronus, the youngest and bravest Titan, a potent weapon to use against his father. Cronus had slain Uranus, but instead of releasing Gaia's children, he and his fellow Titans created a "paradise" of subservience on the planet Earth. However, fearing an oracle which foretold that his own children would rise up against him, Cronus had swallowed each of them as they were born, except his son Zeus, whom Rhea had saved. When Zeus reaches manhood, he frees his brothers Poseidon and Hades, and Gaia's imprisoned children. Together, the Olympian Gods and their monstrous allies defeat the Titans, who are imprisoned in columns of stone in Tartarus.

Thousands of years had passed; the Titaness Thia had escaped, and a freed Hyperion had sought a new mate in Wonder Girl. Zeus and the Olympian Gods are joined against the avenging elder Titans by the rest of the Teen Titans, Donna's adopted mother Queen Hippolyta, and her Amazons of Paradise Island. Zeus and his daughter Athena ultimately convince Cronus that mankind must have free will to chart his own destiny, and not be controlled by the gods. Wonder Girl is released from her spell and the Titans of Myth return to Tartarus to forge a new life for themselves there.

Sometime later, Thia resurfaces, intent to conquer Olympus. It is also revealed that Thia is the mother of Lilith Clay, a former member of the Teen Titans who possesses psychic powers. Fearing reprisals from her fellow Titans, Thia sets the Giants of Myth against them. Despite the assistance of the Teen Titans, Iapetus, Crius, and Tethys are all killed before Hyperion sacrifices his life to destroy his mad wife Thia. Zeus invites the surviving Titans to stay on Olympus and live in peace; the offer is accepted.

=== Titan Seeds ===
DC Comics introduced the Crisis on Infinite Earths miniseries in 1985. The storyline rewrote the history of almost all the DC Comics characters, causing many to be reintroduced as all-new characters complete with new origins. Wonder Woman's own pre-Crisis history was written out of existence, and a new version of the character was reintroduced. In her new origin Wonder Woman becomes a new arrival from Themyscira (the former Paradise Island). Because of this the character of Donna Troy tied predominantly to the Titans also changed. Her origin was retconned to fit into the new continuity created by Wonder Woman's relaunch, initially severing her direct ties to the Amazons. In the storyline "Who Is Wonder Girl?", the Titans of Myth enlist Donna's aid against the murderous Sparta of Synriannaq. The pre-Crisis storyline with the Titans of Myth is rendered nonexistent, and previously "destroyed" Titans like Hyperion and Thia exist as part of the group.

In the new timeline, when the Olympian Gods had overthrown the elder Titans, Kronos had been mistakenly believed destroyed, and the rest of the Titans of Myth are banished from Earth into the farthest reaches of space. Lacking the power to even attempt to return to Earth, the Titans transform a nearby moon into "New Cronus" and begin to guide the primitive race on the nearby planet Synriannaq. Being the only Titan without a spouse, Rhea mates many times with these primitives; the resulting demigods make war on the planet. After 3,000 years pass, the Titans abandon all hope of guiding that world. These gods are still driven to bequeath their power to sentients; to this end, Rhea sacrifices herself and sends her own energy out into the universe. Her power falls upon several worlds and "seeds" a child from each. Each of these children is plucked from certain death and taken to New Cronus, where they are bestowed with superhuman powers. At age 13, the Seeds had been returned to their home planets with no memory of their time with the Titans. Upon adulthood, they would be called to return, more powerful, and as gods, to New Cronus.

It is revealed that a young Donna had been rescued by Rhea from a fire, and that she and Sparta had been two of the 12 Titan Seeds, named after ancient Greek cities. While Donna, called "Troy", had grown up without memories of her time with the Titans, Sparta had shaken Mnemosyne's amnesia, and the knowledge had eventually driven her mad. She had conquered Synriannaq; unable to defeat the Titans of Myth themselves, she had begun killing her fellows Seeds to "collect" their powers. The Titan Phoebe escapes and makes her way to Earth in search of Donna. With Donna's memories restored, a weakened Phoebe dies. Donna's fellow Titans evade Sparta's assassins and use Sparta's "travelspheres" to return to New Cronus. Xanthi of Ozyron and Athyns of Karakkan are the only other Seeds still left alive. Xanthi dies in the battle against Sparta; with the help of Donna's ally Raven, Sparta is contained, and the full powers of the Titans of Myth are restored. Their plan all along had been to use their Seeds' growing power to add to their own and break Zeus' curse; they do, and vow never again to interfere with sentient lives. The Titans of Myth take a vegetative Sparta into their care. Donna receives several gifts: a pendant of Cronus, from Coeus; an armored metal from Thia and Hyperion; earrings from Iapetus and Themis; a bracelet that had belonged to Phoebe; a cloth of the firmament, from Mnemosyne and Crius; a mystic net from Oceanus and Tethys; and the name, Troia, from Rhea. The Titans themselves departed for parts unknown. Donna changes her pseudonym from "Wonder Girl" to "Troia" and adopts a new costume incorporating the mystical gifts from the Titans of Myth.

=== War of the Gods ===
During a great battle between the Olympians and the sorceress Circe, the Olympians bequeath Olympus to the Roman Gods. They leave Earth to join the Titans of Myth in their exploration of the universe. The Olympians eventually return to Earth (Wonder Woman (vol. 2) #122) and merge with their Roman counterparts.

=== Children of Cronus ===
Though the Titans have remained true to their quest, their brother Cronus grew bitter during his imprisonment. He eventually cultivated a cult of believers to fuel his powers. His true goal was to possess all the power of the God Wave on Earth. To do this, he would have to defeat and destroy all the deities on Earth. He began by releasing the remainder of his progeny from his belly (those who had not been regurgitated at the time of Zeus' triumph). These were:

- Arch, god of strategy
- Disdain, goddess of vanity
- Warrior, god of death
- Oblivion, god of memory
- Slaughter, god of destruction
- Titan, god of conquest

Another key to their success was the creation of a champion. As his children had created and empowered Princess Diana of Themyscira, so did Cronus create Devastation, a being gifted by all these new Titans. The Titan first heralded the coming Cronus, then Oblivion made an unsuccessful attempt to enslave Diana within her own Wonder Dome. Devastation also proved unsuccessful against Diana; then Cronus made his move. He began by defeating the Olympians and casting Zeus down to Earth. He then conquered the Hindu pantheon and headed for Heaven. Wonder Woman freed the Olympians and united with the Hindus and the Pax Dei (heavenly host). Diana trounced Cronus but the god still managed to touch the power of the Presence. In doing so, he gained perfect clarity. Humbled, he gave up his corporeal form and returned to mother Gaea.

This upheaval soon moved Zeus to form an alliance with the other pantheons. Indeed, Zeus soon appeared to Superman with several allies under the banner of I.D.C.A.P. (Interfaith Deity Council of Active Polytheistics).

=== The Return of Donna Troy ===
Donna Troy's role in Infinite Crisis is, at the end of The Return of Donna Troy, fully stated: Donna had been reborn after her death at the hands of the Superman android. The Titans of Myth, realizing that she was the child who was destined to save them from some impending threat, brought her to New Cronus and implanted false memories within her mind to make her believe she was the original Goddess of the Moon and wife of Coeus. The Titans of Myth incited war between other worlds near New Cronus in order to gain new worshipers. They would then use the combined power of their collective faith to open a passageway into another reality, where they would be safe from destruction. Donna was another means to that end until she was found by the Teen Titans and the Outsiders, who restored her true memories.

This was not without casualties, however. Sparta (who was restored to full mental health and stripped of the bulk of her power) had been made an officer in the Titans of Myth's royal military. She was sacrificed by the Titans of Myth in an attempt to lay siege to the planet, Minosyss, which housed a Sun-Eater factory miles beneath its surface. But Sparta's death had inadvertently helped trigger Donna's memory restoration. Athyns had also reappeared by this time, and aided the heroes and the Mynossian resistance in battling the Titans of Myth. It was then that Hyperion, the Titan of the Sun, revealed Donna's true origins to her and ordered her to open a passageway into another reality by means of a dimensional nexus that once served as a gateway to the Multiverse itself, within the Sun-Eater factory's core, which turned out to be the Titans of Myth's real target.

Donna did so, but fearing they would simply continue with their power-mad ambitions, she banished most of them (Oceanus, Tethys, Crius, Mnemosyne, Iapetus and Themis), into Tartarus. However, Hyperion and his wife, Thia, were warned of the deception at the last moment by Iapetus. Enraged, they turned on Donna, intending to kill her for the betrayal, but Coeus activated the Sun-Eater to save her and Arsenal. As the Sun-Eater began absorbing their vast solar energies, Hyperion and Thia tried to escape through the Nexus, but they were both torn apart by the combined forces of the Nexus' dimensional pull and the Sun-Eater's power. Coeus, who had learned humility and compassion from Donna, vowed to guard the gateway to make certain the six other Titans of Myth remained imprisoned forever.
