= The Battle of the Labyrinth =

2008 novel by Rick Riordan

- The front cover of the first U.S. edition.
- Author: Rick Riordan
- Cover artist: John Rocco
- Series: Percy Jackson & the Olympians
- Release number: 4
- Genre: Children's fantasy; Action fiction; Adventure fiction; Middle grade fiction; Greek mythology; Children's fiction
- Publisher: Hyperion Books for Children
- Publication date: 6 May 2008 (US); 3 July 2008 (UK)
- Publication place: United States
- Media type: Print (hardback), audiobook
- Pages: 361
- ISBN: 9781423101468
- OCLC: 180753884
- LC Class: PZ7.R4829 Bat 2008
- Preceded by: The Titan's Curse
- Followed by: The Last Olympian

The Battle of the Labyrinth is a 2008 American children's fantasy novel based on Greek mythology written by American author Rick Riordan. The fourth novel in the Percy Jackson & the Olympians series, the book was first published in the United States on 6 May 2008 by Hyperion Books for Children, an imprint of Disney Publishing Worldwide. It has been published in hardcover, audiobook, ebook, and large-print editions. The Battle of the Labyrinth has been translated into 29 languages from its original English.

The book follows the adventures of modern-day fourteen-year-old demigod Percy Jackson, the son of Sally Jackson, a mortal woman, and the Greek god Poseidon. Percy and his friends Annabeth Chase, Grover Underwood, Rachel Dare, and Tyson attempt to stop Luke Castellan and his army from invading Camp Half-Blood through Daedalus's labyrinth by trying to prevent Ariadne's string from falling into his hands.

The Battle of the Labyrinth received mostly positive reviews, with critics praising the storyline, humor, and action present in the novel. It was on the Amazon Children's bestseller list and Publishers Weekly Facts and Figures bestseller list. It was also the runner-up for the 2010 Indian Paintbrush Book Award.

== Plot ==
Percy Jackson attends freshman orientation at Goode High School, where he sees Rachel Elizabeth Dare, a mortal girl who can see through the Mist. She helps him fight two empousai and escape. This causes Rachel to be arrested and imprisoned at a prison. Percy travels to Camp Half-Blood, where he learns Grover is in trouble with the Council of Cloven Elders for not having found Pan. Annabeth Chase and Percy find an entrance into the Labyrinth, which presents a possible invasion route for Luke Castellan. Annabeth is given a quest to find Daedalus and convince him not to give Ariadne's string to Luke, which would help him navigate the Labyrinth. She chooses Grover, Percy, and Tyson to accompany her. Before leaving, Percy learns that Nico di Angelo plans to resurrect his late sister, Bianca (with help from King Minos) by exchanging her soul for someone who has cheated death – like Percy.

In the maze, Percy and his friends face many trials, including meeting Briares and Janus, before arriving at the ranch of Geryon and meeting Nico. Nico is not happy to see Percy again, but the spirit of Bianca convinces him to trust Percy. So that Nico can be safe, he remains at the ranch while Percy and the others return to the labyrinth. They seek out Hephaestus' help. After speaking to him, they part ways; Tyson and Grover search for Pan, while Annabeth and Percy go to the God's forge in the volcano Mount St. Helens. In the forge, Percy is almost killed by Kronos's smiths. Percy and Annabeth kiss before he escapes by causing an earthquake that ejects him from the volcano.

When Percy awakens, he finds himself on the island Ogygia with Calypso, a daughter of the Titan Atlas. Calypso tells Percy she is cursed to fall in love with every hero that lands on her island, but the hero can never stay. After Hephaestus tells him of events in the mortal world, Percy departs the island. Back at Camp Half-Blood, Percy and Annabeth go to Manhattan to find Rachel, who can navigate the Labyrinth. Despite being captured by Luke's minions, they eventually reach Daedalus's workshop and learn that Quintus is the ancient inventor, living as an automaton. He informs them that he has already helped Luke. The group is discovered by Nico, who tells them Minos has been planning to exchange Daedalus's soul for his own. The four teenagers fight to escape, while Daedalus remains in the maze with his ally and hellhound Mrs. O'Leary.

The quartet later discovers the Titan fortress at Mount Othrys, and learn that Kronos has possessed Luke. They run into Grover and Tyson, and discover the resting place of Pan, who speaks to them and passes part of his fading spirit into each of them. The group, minus Rachel, heads back to Camp Half-Blood to fight. The Titan army floods out of the Labyrinth and appears to be winning until Daedalus arrives with Mrs. O'Leary and Briares. Grover scares off the remaining Titan forces by causing a Panic.

After the battle, Nico helps Daedalus pass on and die, destroying the Labyrinth. And leaves Mrs. O Leary to Percy. After a memorial service for the dead campers, Percy leaves camp for the school year. On his 15th birthday at summer's end, Percy receives a visit from his father Poseidon, who gives him a sand dollar, advising him to "spend it wisely". Later, Nico appears to tell Percy his plan to defeat Luke once and for all.

== Characters ==
- Percy Jackson is the 14-year-old son of Poseidon. He is the series' narrator. He joins Annabeth in her quest to go into the Labyrinth to find Daedalus' workshop.
- Annabeth Chase is the 14-year-old daughter of Athena, and one of Percy's closest friends. She gets the quest to navigate the Labyrinth. Her feelings for Percy start to show, but she is confused because of her lingering feelings toward Luke.
- Rachel Elizabeth Dare is a mortal who can see through the Mist, who was imprisoned by making by a likely story from Goode. Her father is a wealthy businessman who buys the undeveloped land of the wild and builds developments upon it. Percy had previously met her at the Hoover Dam in The Titan's Curse, where she helped him get away from undead warriors.
- Grover Underwood is a satyr and Percy's best friend. His life's ambition is to find Pan, the lost god of the Wild. Grover, Tyson, Percy, Annabeth, Nico find Pan inside Carlsbad Caverns along with some extinct animals. He gave all of them except Nico words of wisdom, and then died. When he died, his essence entered all the characters' mouths (except Nico), meaning a piece of the wild remained in their hearts. He gave Grover the famous battle cry, Panic, which Grover used to scare off the intruders in Camp Half-Blood. The word Panic is named after Pan because in the Titan war, he let out a horrible cry that drove away all their enemies.
- Tyson is Percy's cyclops half-brother. He now works for his father in Poseidon's palace, under the oceans, in the Cyclopes' forge. Tyson enjoys forging, and nicknaming mythical creatures they come across. He joins Percy and his friends in the Labyrinth.
- Nico di Angelo is an 11-year-old son of Hades. Upset that his sister Bianca died, he is slightly unstable, and attempts to trade Daedalus' soul for that of Bianca. He has a sword made of Stygian iron.
- Luke Castellan is a 22-year-old son of Hermes and a traitor to the Olympians. His body becomes possessed by the spirit of Kronos.
- Daedalus/Quintus was the creator of the Labyrinth and son of Athena, and has made a total of five automatons in order to cheat death. He becomes the new swordsman at Camp Half-Blood under the name Quintus, but only to see if Camp Half-Blood is worth saving. During the intrusion of Camp Half-Blood, he is stabbed, but instead of blood coming out of the wound, golden oil leaks from his automaton body. He has a murderer's mark on his neck (a partridge), a brand that appears on all of his bodies as a curse from Athena because he killed his nephew, Perdix. He owns a hellhound named Mrs. O'Leary. After his death, he was assigned to build overpasses and bridges to help control traffic in the Underworld and according to Nico, he is happy with this job. Before he dies, he gives Annabeth a laptop containing all the works he never had time to complete, as well as many of his ideas and theories.

== Composition and marketing ==
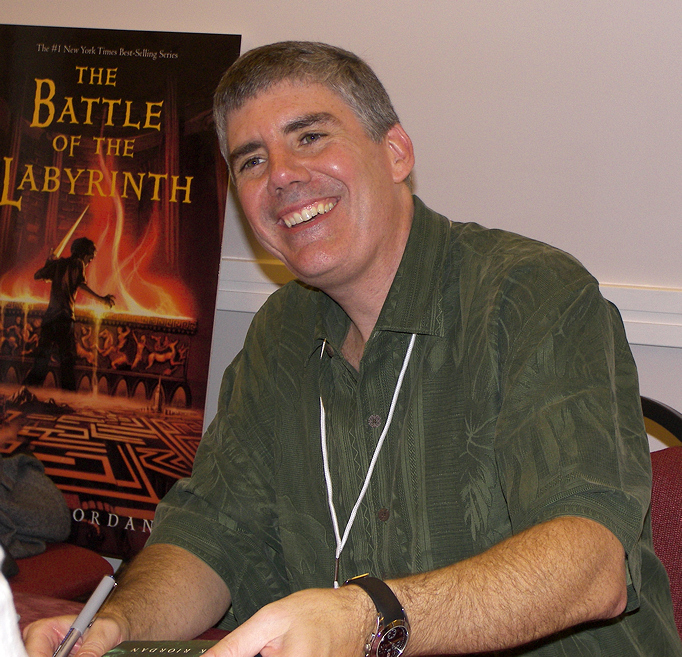
Rick Riordan, the author, at the release of The Battle of the Labyrinth

The Battle of the Labyrinth was initially referred to as Percy 4 until the title was officially revealed. The novel was teased by Rick Riordan behind the pages of its predecessor, The Titan's Curse. It was based on the Greek myth of the labyrinth, where the Minotaur was supposedly kept. In his book, Riordan made the labyrinth grow to cover the entire undergrowth of the United States.

On 4 October 2007, Publishers Weekly revealed the book's title along with the cover art by John Rocco. A preview of the book was read out for children to judge, and the reactions were "unbelievable", according to the author. Riordan went on a tour to promote the book. He revealed that he would read a sneak peek of the first chapter at Barnes & Noble, Utah. In January 2008, he read a sneak peek of the first chapter.

A trailer video was also uploaded on YouTube. In February 2008, an advertisement video was officially released. Riordan was bothered with the previous novel's plot leaking out due to advance reader copies (ARC) and as a result, the novel had no ARC prints. A month before the novel's release, Riordan revealed his tour plans. Shortly after the book's publication, Riordan spoke at the 30 May Evening with Children's Booksellers, as part of the 2008 BookExpo America. At this time, the Percy Jackson series was the third bestselling children's book series in America, behind the Twilight Saga and The Clique series, according to Publishers Weekly.

== Release ==
The Battle of the Labyrinth was first published as a hardcover in the United States on 6 May 2008 by Hyperion Books for Children, an imprint of Disney Publishing Worldwide, and had a first printing of about one million copies. On 13 May 2008, a ten-hour and 32-minute audiobook version of The Battle of the Labyrinth, read by actor Jesse Bernstein, who also read the audiobooks of the previous 3 books in the series, was published worldwide by Listening Library.

The novel was also on the Amazon Children's bestseller list and the Publishers Weekly Facts and Figures bestseller list, having sold nearly 105,000 copies in 2010 since its release in 2008. It was released in the United Kingdom with new covers.

Since its release, The Battle of the Labyrinth has been translated into Bulgarian, Catalan (Valencian), Chinese, Czech, Danish, Dutch, Estonian, Finnish, French, German, Greek, Hebrew, Hungarian, Indonesian, Italian, Lithuanian, Norwegian, Persian, Polish, Portuguese, Romanian, Russian, Slovak, Slovenian, Spanish, Swedish, Thai, Turkish and Vietnamese. Although many non-English editions used John Rocco's cover art, a few, like the Puffin editions, have unique covers by other illustrators.

The book received a Lexile score of 590L, making it appropriate for the average 10–13-year-old. Scholastic suggests the book for grades 8–10. VOYA recommended the novel for children in grades 7–12.

== Reception ==
The Battle of the Labyrinth received mostly positive reviews. It has been praised as an excellent continuation to the Percy Jackson & the Olympians series, as well as an excellent novel in its own right. Kirkus Reviews, for example, in its starred review, called the novel "[Riordan's] best one yet...[it] rivals Rowling for inventive, magical storytelling. The often-philosophical tale zips along with snappy dialogue, humor and thrilling action... This volume can stand alone, but no reader will be able to read just one." Children's Literature made similar claims: "Riordan creates a masterful weaving of Greek mythology and traditional fantasy in this latest book... Fans will enjoy the latest adventures of their favorite characters, and those picking the book up for the first time will have no trouble falling into this magical world."

Other reviews focused more on the novel as a continuation to the series. Anita Burkam of Horn Book Magazine said in her review of the novel, "The melding of Greek myths with modern-day settings remains fresh and funny in this fourth installment". David Goodale of VOYA also remarks on Riordan's ability to "keep the material fresh" despite the "far-from-new" quest format. VOYA's highlighted review gave it a 4/5 for quality and 5/5 for popularity. Publishers Weekly's starred review states, "One of Riordan's strengths is the wry interplay between the real and the surreal", adding, "the wit, rousing swordplay and breakneck pace [in this installment] will once again keep kids hooked." The website KidsReads similarly praised the book, saying "the story arc has remained unified and compelling." The Los Angeles Times gave another positive review, calling it "a glorious, no-holds-barred adventure with great plot twists, a melding of ancient and bionic technology and a cliffhanger ending that will have fans eagerly awaiting the fifth and final showdown between gods and monsters next year."

Matt Berman of Common Sense Media was one of few reviewers to mention the differences between this book and the ones preceding in the series. He highlights The Battle of the Labyrinth's darker tone, more mature themes, and increased discussion of what it philosophically means for the characters to follow and support the Greek gods and Titans. He concludes, "Up until now the series has been great fun, but little more. Now as it begins to grow, like the Labyrinth, larger and deeper and more complex, it's even more fun."

Despite the overall praise, some reviewers were more critical. School Library Journal wrote that "[l]ike many series, the "Percy Jackson" books are beginning to show the strain of familiarity and repetition." The BBC Children News round praised the novel for its smart ideas, but said, "none of it will make sense if you haven't read any of the other books." Nelda Brangwin of Library Media Connection wrote, "If this is the only book read in the series, readers may be confused by the storyline and profusion of mythological creatures. It reads well on its own if readers are familiar with mythology, but is best if the other three books are in the library collection." The Guardian commented that, the book is "funny and scary at moments and makes you want to read more".

The audiobook was also well received. AudioFile magazine praised the audiobook, raving, "Speedy introductions of familiar and new characters and previous plot summaries may briefly confuse a new listener, but fans will savor them," adding "Jesse Bernstein is on target whether he's narrating blow-by-blow accounts of Percy's sword fights or inventing cameos for various other characters: Hephaestus, who repairs a Toyota; an aged Daedalus; and Grover, Percy's slow-witted sidekick. Bernstein is just as skillful at wringing humor from the witty dialogue and from the contrasts between the modern and ancient worlds." Booklist similarly praised Bernstein's familiarity with the series and ability to realistically portray its teenaged protagonists, commenting, "His portrayal of Percy stands out as he manages to sound just like a 15-year-old boy." The work's review in The School Library Journal was also favorable, praising Bernstein for "[doing] a good job voicing Percy and his Cyclops half-brother" and "successfully [conveying] Annabeth's emotions". He attempts a number of different accents for the gods, demigods, and mortals in the story with varying levels of success."

The Battle of the Labyrinth was nominated for the 2010 Indian Paintbrush Book Award, earning the second position.

== Sequel ==
The sequel to The Battle of the Labyrinth is titled The Last Olympian and was released 5 May 2009. It is the final novel in the Percy Jackson and the Olympians series. The Last Olympian was No. 1 on the USA Today bestseller list.
