= Mnemosyne =

Greek goddess of memory

- Goddess of memory and remembrance
- Member of the Titans
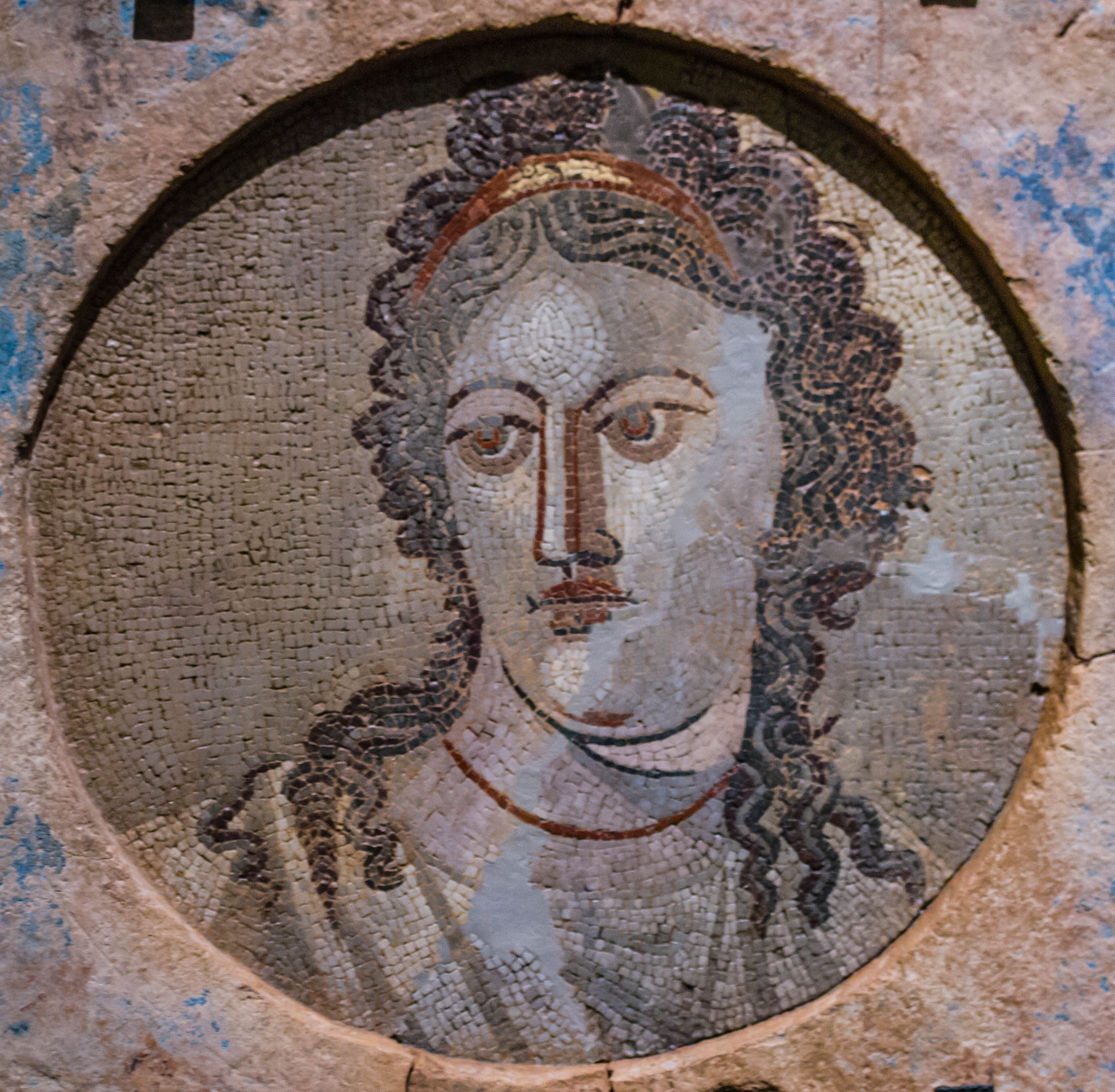
- Antique mosaic of Mnemosyne, National Archaeological Museum of Tarragona
- Greek: Μνημοσύνη
- Abode: Mount Olympus

Genealogy
- Parents: Uranus and Gaia
- Siblings: Titans: Crius; Cronus; Coeus; Hyperion; Iapetus; Oceanus; Phoebe; Rhea; Tethys; Theia; Themis; Hecatoncheires: Briareus; Cottus; Gyges; Cyclopes: Arges; Brontes; Steropes
- Consorts: Zeus
- Offspring: The Muses: Calliope; Clio; Erato; Euterpe; Melpomene; Polyhymnia; Terpsichore; Thalia; Urania

In Greek mythology, Mnemosyne (/nɪˈmɒzɪniː, nɪˈmɒsɪniː/; Ancient Greek: Μνημοσύνη, pronounced [mnɛːmosýːnɛː]) was one of the Titans, who are the children of Uranus (Sky) and Gaia (Earth). She was the goddess of memory and the mother of the nine Muses by Zeus. The name Mnemosyne is derived from the Greek word mnēmē ('remembrance, memory').

== Family ==
As one of the twelve Titans, Mnemosyne is the daughter of Uranus (Sky) and Gaia (Earth). Mnemosyne became the mother of the nine Muses, fathered by her nephew, Zeus; Calliope (epic poetry), Clio (history), Euterpe (music and lyric poetry), Erato (love poetry), Melpomene (tragedy), Polyhymnia (hymns), Terpsichore (dance), Thalia (comedy), and Urania (astronomy).

Hyginus in his Fabulae gives Mnemosyne a different parentage, where she was the daughter of Zeus and Clymene.

== Mythology ==
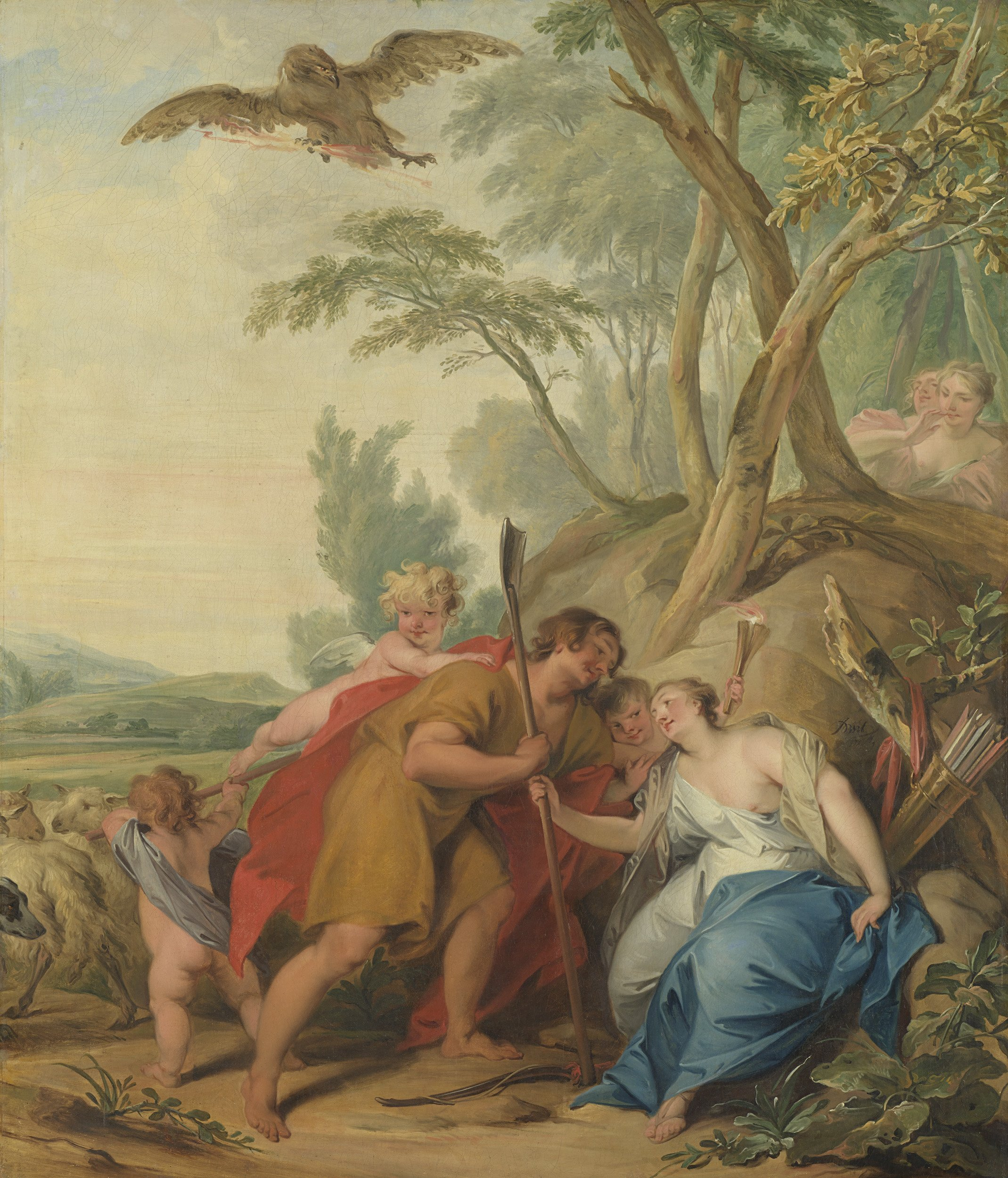
Jupiter, disguised as a shepherd, tempts Mnemosyne by Jacob de Wit (1727)

In Hesiod's Theogony, kings and poets receive their powers of authoritative speech from their possession of Mnemosyne and their special relationship with the Muses. Zeus, in the form of a mortal shepherd, slept together with Mnemosyne for nine consecutive nights, thus conceiving the nine Muses. Mnemosyne also presided over a pool in Hades, a counterpart to the river Lethe, according to a series of 4th-century BC Greek funerary inscriptions in dactylic hexameter. Dead souls drank from Lethe so they would not remember their past lives when reincarnated. In Orphism, the initiated were taught to instead drink from the Mnemosyne, the river of memory, which would stop the transmigration of the soul.

=== Appearance in oral literature ===
Although she was categorized as one of the Titans in the Theogony, Mnemosyne did not quite fit that distinction. Titans were hardly worshiped in Ancient Greece, and were thought of as so archaic as to belong to the ancient past. They resembled historical figures more than anything else. Mnemosyne, on the other hand, traditionally appeared in the first few lines of many oral epic poems —she appears in both the Iliad and the Odyssey, among others—as the speaker called upon her aid in accurately remembering and performing the poem they were about to recite. Mnemosyne is thought to have been given the distinction of "Titan" because memory was so important and basic to the oral culture of the Greeks that they deemed her one of the essential building blocks of civilization in their creation myth.

Later, once written literature overtook the oral recitation of epics, Plato made reference in his Euthydemus to the older tradition of invoking Mnemosyne. The character Socrates prepares to recount a story and says "ὥστ᾽ ἔγωγε, καθάπερ οἱ (275d) ποιηταί, δέομαι ἀρχόμενος τῆς διηγήσεως Μούσας τε καὶ Μνημοσύνην ἐπικαλεῖσθαι." which translates to "Consequently, like the poets, I must needs begin my narrative with an invocation of the Muses and Memory" (emphasis added). Aristophanes also harked back to the tradition in his play Lysistrata when a drunken Spartan ambassador invokes her name while prancing around pretending to be a bard from times of yore.

== Cult ==
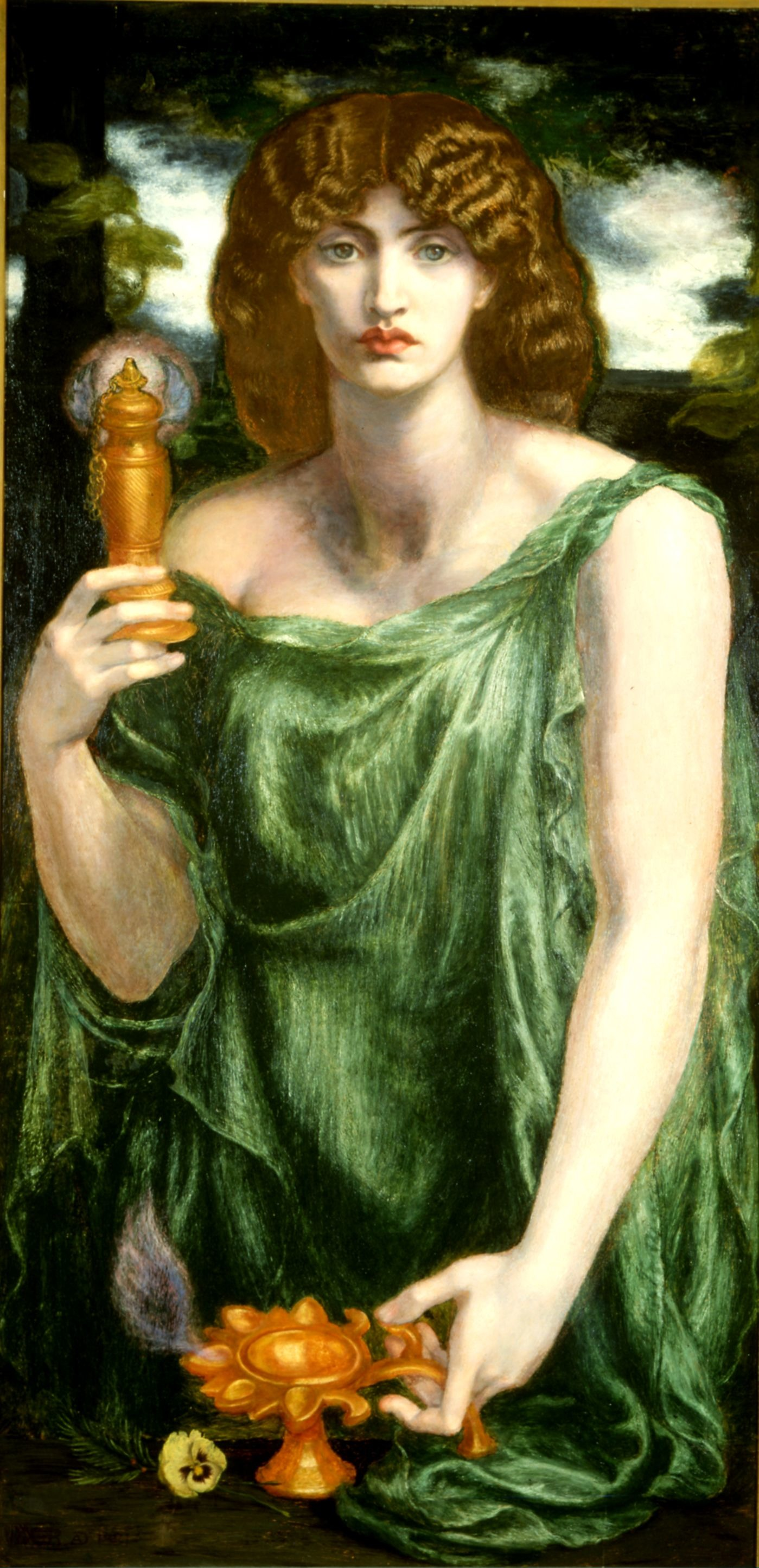
Mnemosyne (also known as Lamp of Memory or Ricordanza) by Dante Gabriel Rossetti (c. 1876 to 1881).

While not one of the most popular divinities, Mnemosyne was the subject of some minor worship in Ancient Greece. Statues of her are mentioned in the sanctuaries of other gods, and she was often depicted alongside her daughters the Muses. She was also worshipped in Lebadeia in Boeotia, at Mount Helicon in Boeotia, and in the cult of Asclepius.

There was a statue of Mnemosyne in the shrine of Dionysos at Athens, alongside the statues of the Muses, Zeus and Apollo, as well as a statue with her daughters the Muses in the Temple of Athena Alea. Pausanias described the worship of Mnemosyne in Lebadeia in Boeotia, where she played an important part in the oracular sanctuary of Trophonios:

[Part of the rituals at the oracle of Trophonios (Trophonius) at Lebadeia, Boiotia (Boeotia):] He [the supplicant] is taken by the priests, not at once to the oracle, but to fountains of water very near to each other. Here he must drink water called the water of Lethe (Forgetfulness), that he may forget all that he has been thinking of hitherto, and afterwards he drinks of another water, the water of Mnemosyne (Memory), which causes him to remember what he sees after his descent ... After his ascent from [the oracle of] Trophonios the inquirer is again taken in hand by the priests, who set him upon a chair called the chair of Mnemosyne (Memory), which stands not far from the shrine, and they ask of him, when seated there, all he has seen or learned. After gaining this information they then entrust him to his relatives. These lift him, paralysed with terror and unconscious both of himself and of his surroundings, and carry him to the building where he lodged before with Tykhe (Tyche, Fortune) and the Daimon Agathon (Good Spirit). Afterwards, however, he will recover all his faculties, and the power to laugh will return to him.

Mnemosyne was also sometime regarded as being not the mother of the Muses but as one of them, and as such she was worshiped in the sanctuary of the Muses at Mount Helicon in Boeotia:

The first to sacrifice on Helikon (Helicon) to the Mousai (Muses) and to call the mountain sacred to the Mousai were, they say, Ephialtes and Otos (Otus), who also founded Askra ... The sons of Aloeus held that the Mousai were three in number, and gave them the names Melete (Practice), Mneme (Memory), and Aoide (Aeode, Song). But they say that afterwards Pieros (Pierus), a Makedonian (Macedonian) ... came to Thespiae [in Boiotia] and established nine Mousai, changing their names to the present ones ... Mimnermos [epic poet C7th B.C.] ... says in the preface that the elder Mousai (Muses) are the daughters of Ouranos (Uranus), and that there are other and younger Mousai, children of Zeus.

=== Cult of Asclepius ===
Mnemosyne was one of the deities worshiped in the cult of Asclepius that formed in Ancient Greece around the 5th century BC. Asclepius, a Greek hero and god of medicine, was said to have been able to cure maladies, and the cult incorporated a multitude of other Greek heroes and gods in its process of healing. The exact order of the offerings and prayers varied by location, and the supplicant often made an offering to Mnemosyne. After making an offering to Asclepius himself, in some locations, one last prayer was said to Mnemosyne as the supplicant moved to the holiest portion of the Asclepeion to incubate. The hope was that a prayer to Mnemosyne would help the supplicant remember any visions had while sleeping there.

== Genealogy ==
Mnemosyne's family tree

Uranus	Gaia	Pontus
Oceanus	Tethys	Hyperion	Theia	Crius	Eurybia
The Rivers	The Oceanids	Helios	Selene	Eos	Astraeus	Pallas	Perses
Cronus	Rhea	Coeus	Phoebe
Hestia	Hera	Hades	Zeus	Leto	Asteria
Demeter	Poseidon
Iapetus	Clymene (or Asia)	MNEMOSYNE	(Zeus)	Themis
Atlas	Menoetius	Prometheus	Epimetheus	The Muses	The Horae

== See also ==
- Titans in popular culture: Mnemosyne
- Meme
- Meng Po
- Moneta
- Lethe

== Sources ==
- Aeschylus, Persians. Seven against Thebes. Suppliants. Prometheus Bound. Edited and translated by Alan H. Sommerstein. Loeb Classical Library No. 145. Cambridge, Massachusetts: Harvard University Press, 2009. ISBN 978-0-674-99627-4. Online version at Harvard University Press.
- Anonymous, The Homeric Hymns and Homerica with an English Translation by Hugh G. Evelyn-White. Homeric Hymns. Cambridge, MA., Harvard University Press; London, William Heinemann Ltd. 1914. Online version at the Perseus Digital Library.
- Antoninus Liberalis, The Metamorphoses of Antoninus Liberalis translated by Francis Celoria (Routledge 1992). Online version at the Topos Text Project.
- Apollodorus, Apollodorus, The Library, with an English Translation by Sir James George Frazer, F.B.A., F.R.S. in 2 Volumes. Cambridge, Massachusetts, Harvard University Press; London, William Heinemann Ltd. 1921. Online version at the Perseus Digital Library.
- Caldwell, Richard, Hesiod's Theogony, Focus Publishing/R. Pullins Company (June 1, 1987). ISBN 978-0-941051-00-2.
- Clement of Alexandria, Recognitions from Ante-Nicene Library Volume 8, translated by Smith, Rev. Thomas. T. & T. Clark, Edinburgh. 1867. Online version at theio.com
- Diodorus Siculus, Diodorus Siculus: The Library of History. Translated by Charles Henry Oldfather. Twelve volumes. Loeb Classical Library. Cambridge, Massachusetts: Harvard University Press; London: William Heinemann, Ltd. 1989.Online version at the Lacus Curtius: Into the Roman World.
- Hesiod, The Homeric Hymns and Homerica with an English Translation by Hugh G. Evelyn-White, Cambridge, MA., Harvard University Press; London, William Heinemann Ltd. 1914. Online version at the Perseus Digital Library.
- Hyginus, Fabulae from The Myths of Hyginus translated and edited by Mary Grant. University of Kansas Publications in Humanistic Studies. Online version at the Topos Text Project.
- Ovid, Metamorphoses translated by Brookes More (1859–1942). Boston, Cornhill Publishing Co. 1922. Online version at the Topos Text Project.
- Pausanias, Description of Greece with an English Translation by W.H.S. Jones, Litt.D., and H.A. Ormerod, M.A., in 4 Volumes. Cambridge, MA, Harvard University Press; London, William Heinemann Ltd. 1918. Online version at the Perseus Digital Library
- Plato (1924). "Euthydemus". Plato, with an English translation. Vol. IV Laches Protagoras Meno Euthydemus. Translated by Lamb, W. R. M. Cambridge, Mass. hdl:2027/iau.31858002195018. ISBN 978-0-674-99221-4. OCLC 875718 – via HathiTrust.
