= The Titan's Curse =

2007 book by Rick Riordan

- The front cover of the first U.S.A edition.
- Author: Rick Riordan
- Cover artist: John Rocco
- Series: Percy Jackson & the Olympians
- Release number: 3
- Genre: Children's fantasy; Action fiction; Adventure fiction; Middle grade fiction; Greek mythology; Children's fiction
- Publisher: Miramax Books/Hyperion Books for Children
- Publication date: May 1, 2007
- Publication place: United States
- Media type: Print (hardcover), audiobook
- Pages: 312
- ISBN: 978-1-4231-0145-1
- OCLC: 76863948
- LC Class: PZ7.R4829 Tit 2007
- Preceded by: The Sea of Monsters
- Followed by: The Battle of the Labyrinth

The Titan's Curse is a 2007 American children's fantasy novel based on Greek mythology written by American author Rick Riordan. The third novel in the Percy Jackson & the Olympians series and the sequel to The Sea of Monsters, it is about the adventures of the 14-year-old demigod Percy Jackson as he and his friends go on a dangerous quest to rescue his 14-year-old demigod friend Annabeth Chase and the Greek goddess Artemis, who have both been kidnapped by the army of Kronos.

The Titan's Curse was published by Miramax Books, an imprint of Hyperion Books for Children, and thus Disney Publishing (succeeded by the Disney Hyperion imprint). It was released in the United States and the United Kingdom on May 1, 2007. The novel was also released in audiobook format, read by Jesse Bernstein.

Mostly well-received, The Titan's Curse was nominated for numerous awards, winning ones such as the No. 1 The New York Times children's series best seller and Book Sense Top thirty Summer Pick for 2010.

The novel is set to be adapted for the third season of the Disney+ television series Percy Jackson & the Olympians.

== Plot ==
Percy Jackson, Annabeth Chase, and Thalia Grace infiltrate West Hall boarding school to escort siblings Bianca and Nico di Angelo to Camp Half-Blood. Though their extraction is a success, the manticore Dr. Thorn captures Annabeth, escaping when Artemis and her Hunters arrive. Artemis sets off alone to track down a monster which, in the wrong hands, has the power to destroy Mount Olympus. She arranges for Apollo to transport the demigods and her Hunters to Camp Half-Blood with his sun chariot. Bianca joins the Hunters, granting her immortality.

At camp, Percy and his pegasus Blackjack rescue an Ophiotaurus, which Percy nicknames "Bessie". Artemis' lieutenant, Zoë Nightshade, dreams of the goddess in danger, while Percy dreams of Annabeth saving Luke Castellan by holding up a cave's ceiling. The mummified Oracle of Delphi disrupts a Capture the Flag game to give Zoë a prophecy, instructing her to travel to Mount Tamalpais, the modern-day location of the Titans' domain of Mount Othrys, to rescue Artemis and Annabeth. Zoë takes Thalia, Bianca, and Grover Underwood with her on the quest. Percy sneaks off on his own, promising Nico that he will protect Bianca.

Traveling to Washington D.C., Percy follows Thorn to the Smithsonian. He witnesses Luke, Thorn, and a man called "The General" summoning spartoi to waylay Zoë's group. Percy warns his friends and helps them defeat the Nemean lion, so Zoë allows Percy to join the group. They travel to Cloudcroft, New Mexico, where the missing god Pan sends the Erymanthian Boar to help the group escape the Spartoi.

They reach Gila Claw, Arizona, the "Junkyard of the Gods". Bianca reveals that she and Nico unknowingly spent decades in the Lotus Hotel; they were born in the 1930s and taken to West Hall. Percy has an encounter with Ares and Aphrodite, who warn him not to take anything from the junkyard. Bianca tries to take a figurine for her brother, awakening a prototype of Talos, and gives her life to destroy it. The survivors travel to Hoover Dam, where Percy encounters Bessie, as well as Rachel Elizabeth Dare, a mortal who can see through the Mist, who helps him escape by distracting the Spartoi. The group flies to San Francisco with help from the dam's Winged Figures of the Republic.

Percy seeks out Nereus and learns that Bessie is the monster Artemis was hunting. After destroying Thorn, Percy sends Grover back to Camp Half-Blood with Bessie. Percy, Zoë, and Thalia turn to Annabeth's father, Frederick Chase, for help, borrowing his car to reach Mount Othrys. There, they enter the Garden of the Hesperides, where Zoë is revealed to be the daughter of Atlas, the General's true identity. Zoë was exiled by her siblings after helping Hercules steal a golden apple and gifting him with Percy's sword Riptide.

Reaching the peak of Mount Othrys, the group finds Artemis holding up the sky, a role that Annabeth was also subjected to, explaining Percy's dreams. While Zoe walks towards Artemis, attempting to save her leader, Luke, Atlas and Annabeth come in to stop them from saving Artemis. Luke is on Atlas's side but Annabeth is Luke's prisoner. Her hands are cuffed behind her back, and there is now a grey streak in her hair as a result of the stress caused by being forced to hold up the entire sky. She uses her eyes to tell Percy to run. Luke tempts Thalia into joining Kronos's forces, but she declines, knocking him off the mountainside. Percy and Artemis trap Atlas beneath the sky, but not before he casts Zoë off a cliff, mortally wounding her. Frederick pilots a Sopwith Camel to distract the monsters, and the demigods escape to a nearby airfield, where Zoë dies of her wounds. Artemis transforms her into a new constellation called the "Huntress."

Percy, Annabeth, Thalia, and Artemis travel to Mount Olympus to attend the gods' winter solstice meeting. Artemis convinces the Olympians of the Titans' threat, and they decide to keep Bessie on Olympus. Thalia joins the Hunters to forestall the Great Prophecy, in which a child of Zeus, Poseidon, or Hades could be used to bring victory for Kronos. Percy learns from Poseidon that Luke is alive. Upon returning to Camp Half-Blood, Percy informs Nico of Bianca's demise. A distraught Nico blames Percy, revealing he is a son of Hades when he banishes the Spartoi to the Underworld before fleeing. Percy tells Annabeth and Grover of Nico's lineage, the trio promising to keep it a secret, fearful that Nico will be the subject of the Great Prophecy.

== Characters ==
- Percy Jackson: Percy, a 14-year-old demigod and son of Poseidon, is the protagonist as well as the series' narrator. He embarks on a journey to save Annabeth and the Greek goddess Artemis, who have both been kidnapped.
- Thalia Grace: Thalia is a 15-year-old demigod daughter of Zeus. Though she appears in Percy's dream in the first book, she makes a full appearance at the end of The Sea of Monsters and is given a greater role in the third book. Thalia is described as looking very punk, with electric blue eyes, black clothes, and spiky hair. Her personality is often described as "independent and many times sarcastic." While Thalia is a lot like Percy (due to both being children of the Big Three), and they become good friends before the events of the book, they often argue. She is heartbroken by Luke's betrayal of the camp and gods, as it is implied that she had feelings for him. She is also afraid of heights, which she reluctantly admits to Percy, despite the fact that she is the daughter of Zeus, God of the Sky. She joins the Huntress of Artemis as the new lieutenant to prevent her from being the child of the Great Prophecy with the permission of her father.
- Annabeth Chase: Annabeth is a 14-year-old demigod and the daughter of Athena. She is friends with Percy, Thalia, and Grover. She is kidnapped, along with Artemis, by the Titans. She has a great passion and interest in architecture, and wishes to be an architect when she is older. Although she has a growing love interest in Percy, her feelings for Luke remain a problem between the two. Percy returns her feelings without realizing it, and is oblivious to how she feels about him.
- Grover Underwood: A large-hearted satyr whose favorite foods are aluminum cans and cheese enchiladas. Grover is 28 years old, but is biologically equivalent to a 14 year old human due to his species aging at half the rate that humans do. He wants to become a searcher for Pan, the satyr god of nature and the wild, who fell into a "deep sleep" due to humans' pollution of the world.
- Bianca di Angelo: Bianca is a 12-year-old demigod and the daughter of Hades. She and her ten-year-old brother Nico were trapped in the Lotus Casino, where time is slowed down, but at the beginning of the book, they got out and she attended an army school in Bar Harbor, Maine. She is killed by an automaton during the quest in the "Junkyard of the Gods".
- Zoë Nightshade: Zoë is the daughter of Atlas, a banished Hesperid for helping the hero Hercules, the first lieutenant of the Hunters of Artemis, and the maker of Percy's sword, Riptide. Due to her age, she often has trouble updating her language and speaking skills, and uses Middle English. She dies after being bitten by Ladon the dragon, who protects the immortality-giving golden apple tree, and after her father Atlas throws her against a pile of rocks. Artemis turns her spirit into a constellation soon after her death. She and Thalia developed grudges against each other after Thalia refused to join the hunters before the events of the series, but they eventually get along before Zoë's demise.
- Luke Castellan: The 21-year-old demigod son of Hermes, Luke is the main antagonist of the series. He is the main crony to Kronos; Kronos' followers and army gather on a ship called the Princess Andromeda. He is thought dead when Thalia kicks him off Mount Tamalpais, but he is later revealed to have survived.
- Nico di Angelo: The 10-year-old demigod son of Hades, he and his older sister, Bianca, are rescued from a manticore by Percy, Annabeth, Thalia, and Grover. He is left at camp during the quest due to his young age, but stays in the Hermes cabin because his parentage has not yet been discovered. He leaves camp after hearing Percy broke his promise to him and letting Bianca die. Before he leaves, he sends an army of skeletal warriors back to the underworld, revealing his parentage.

== Critical reception ==
The Titan's Curse received relatively positive reviews, which often lauded the humor and action in the story. Children's Literature, which commended the book's fast pace and humor, wrote, "Readers will relate to good natured Percy, the protagonist." Kirkus Reviews awarded it a starred review with, "This third in the Olympians series makes the Greek myths come alive in a way no dreary classroom unit can ... will have readers wondering how literature can be this fun. This can stand alone, though newcomers to the series will race back to the first two volumes and eagerly await a fourth installment." School Library Journal praised the "adventurous" plot as well as the book's appeal: "Teachers will cheer for Percy Jackson and the Olympians as they inspire students to embrace Greek mythology and score the ultimate Herculean challenge: getting kids to read. All in all, a winner of Olympic proportions and a surefire read-aloud." Booklist's starred review approved of the novel's humor, action, and plotting: "The Percy Jackson & the Olympians series is built around a terrific idea—that the half-mortal offspring of Greek gods live among us, playing out struggles of mythic scale—and Riordan takes it from strength to strength with this exciting installment, adding even more depth to the characters and story arc while retaining its predecessors' nonstop laughs and action." Kidsreads raved, "Rick Riordan's Olympian adventures have gained great popularity thanks to their combination of humor, adventure and a winning hero ... Readers who are familiar with ancient mythology will enjoy Riordan's tongue-in-cheek approach; those who aren't just might be tempted to go to the original sources to learn more."

=== Awards and nominations ===
The Titan's Curse received several literature-related awards, including: number one The New York Times children's series best seller and Book Sense Top Ten Summer Pick for 2007. It was also a Quill Award nominee.

== Adaptations ==
=== Audiobook ===
An eight-hour-and-forty-eight-minute audiobook read by the actor Jesse Bernstein and published by Listening Library was released on April 24, 2007.

AudioFile Magazine lauded Bernstein's interpretation, writing, "Sounding alternately young, or old, or really scary, Jesse Bernstein ... effectively voices the confusion and loss the team experiences."

=== Television adaptation ===
On March 14, 2025, the Disney+ television series Percy Jackson and the Olympians was renewed for a third season that will adapt The Titan's Curse. The season premiered on November 20, 2026.

== Sequel ==
In The Battle of the Labyrinth, Annabeth and Percy find an entrance into the Labyrinth during a game of capture the flag. Percy soon learns that Luke had used the entrance and will lead his army through the Labyrinth straight in to the heart of camp. To get into the Labyrinth, Percy has to find the symbol of Daedalus, the Greek letter delta, (Δ) on a passageway, touch it, and then enter the Labyrinth. Using the Labyrinth, Percy tries to find Daedalus so Luke cannot get Ariadne's string, thereby foiling Luke's invasion.

== See also ==
- Mythology
- Greek gods
