= The Last Olympian =

2009 fantasy novel by Rick Riordan

- Cover of first edition
- Author: Rick Riordan
- Cover artist: John Rocco
- Series: Percy Jackson & the Olympians
- Release number: 5
- Genre: Children's fantasy; Action fiction; Adventure fiction; Middle grade fiction; Greek mythology; Children's fiction
- Publisher: Disney Hyperion
- Publication date: May 5, 2009
- Publication place: United States
- Media type: Print (hardcover), audiobook
- Pages: 381
- ISBN: 978-1-4231-0147-5
- OCLC: 299578184
- LC Class: PZ7.R4829 Las 2009b
- Preceded by: The Battle of the Labyrinth
- Followed by: The Chalice of the Gods; The Lost Hero (from The Heroes of Olympus)

The Last Olympian is a 2009 American children's fantasy novel based on Greek mythology written by American author Rick Riordan. It is the fifth and final novel of the original Percy Jackson & the Olympians series and is the direct sequel to The Battle of the Labyrinth. The Last Olympian revolves around the demigod Percy Jackson as he leads his friends in a last stand to protect Mount Olympus.

Upon release, the book received highly positive reviews from various critics. It was also the #1 USA Today bestseller, the #1 Wall Street Journal bestseller, and #1 Los Angeles Times bestseller.

== Plot ==
While Percy Jackson is on a drive with Rachel Dare, he is approached by Charles Beckendorf, and the two head off to attack Luke's ship, The Princess Andromeda. Kronos, hosted in the mortal body of Luke, is not caught off guard because of a spy at Camp Half-Blood, and Beckendorf is killed in an explosion. Percy awakens in his father Poseidon's underwater palace, which is under siege by the Titan Oceanus. Percy wants to help fight, but Poseidon sends Percy back to Camp Half-Blood to hear the "Great Prophecy". Once there, Percy informs the camp of the spy and learns that the Olympians are fighting Typhon. Moreover, the Ares and Apollo cabins altercate over credit for a golden chariot they had successfully retrieved from Kronos last winter; Ares's head counselor, Clarisse La Rue swears that no one from their cabin will contribute to the war unless the credit goes to them.

The following night, Percy leaves with Nico di Angelo, son of Hades, following a lead on how to defeat Kronos. After visiting Luke's mother in Westport, Connecticut, and talking with Hestia, Percy procures a blessing from his mother. He then descends into the Underworld to bathe in the River Styx and take on the curse of Achilles. Despite being betrayed by Nico in exchange for information on the latter's mother, Percy successfully uses his new invulnerability to defeat a small army of Hades's minions.

Percy emerges from the Underworld in New York City, leaving Nico behind to convince his father to join the fight against Kronos. Percy calls the campers to help defend Olympus, as the gods refuse to end their struggle with Typhon. Just before the battle begins, New York City is affected by a powerful sleeping spell from Morpheus, Hecate, and Kronos. Despite being joined by Thalia's Hunters of Artemis, the Party Ponies, and a few other allies, the Olympian army struggles to hold back repeated assaults by the Titan army. Camp Half-Blood suffers 16 deaths. Annabeth herself is badly injured when she saves Percy from an attack by Ethan Nakamura that would have hit Percy in his Achilles' heel.

Even after these setbacks, Percy refuses a chance to surrender offered by Prometheus, marked by releasing the spirit of hope inside Pandora's pithos, which Percy later entrusts to Hestia. The campers defeat Hyperion, further enraging Kronos. Rachel Dare, who has been experiencing inexplicable moments of prophecy, arrives to warn Percy of a drakon that can only be killed by a child of Ares. The campers do poorly against the drakon until Aphrodite head counsellor Silena Beauregard arrives, disguised as Clarisse and breaks the cabin's boycott of the war, getting badly injured in the process. The actual Clarisse arrives and kills the drakon by herself. As Silena lies dying, the campers learn that she was the spy, but she chose to right her wrongs after her boyfriend Beckendorf's death.

Percy contacts his father and asks Poseidon to join the fight against Typhon; he reluctantly agrees. Driven back to the blocks surrounding the Empire State Building, Percy and his friends make their last stand to protect Mount Olympus. Even when Hades arrives with Nico and an army, Kronos still manages to enter Olympus. Percy attacks Kronos without either side gaining a significant advantage. In an Iris message-vision, the combatants see Typhon approaching New York, only to be defeated with the aid of Poseidon and his cyclopes. Ethan Nakamura rebels against Kronos but is killed. When Kronos attacks Annabeth, Luke regains control of his body, and, with Percy's help, he injures himself at his mortal point and defeats Kronos. As he dies, Luke tells Percy that Ethan was right; the resentment of unrecognized gods and unclaimed children caused the war. He dies peacefully, and the Fates carry his body away.

The gods reward the heroes who were instrumental in defeating the Titans, including Thalia, Grover, Annabeth, Tyson, Clarisse, and Nico. When Percy is called forward, Zeus offers him the greatest gift of all time: immortal godhood. Much to the Olympians' shock, Percy cordially turns down the gift, and instead asks the gods to swear on the River Styx that they will claim all demigods by the time they turn 13, have cabins built for the children of all minor gods and Hades, and give amnesty to innocent Titans and their former allies, such as Calypso. Percy also relieves Zeus, Poseidon, and Hades of their oath not to have demigod children. Privately, Hermes reveals to Percy that Kronos is not dead but is instead hopefully spread so thin that he can never form a consciousness again, as the Titans cannot die any more than the gods can. After the meeting, Percy discovers that Rachel plans to become the new Oracle, and he rushes to camp with Annabeth and Nico. With Apollo's supervision, Rachel safely becomes the new Oracle and speaks the next Great Prophecy. Annabeth celebrates Percy's birthday, and the two begin dating. The gods keep their new promises, and Camp Half-Blood slowly returns to normal.

== Prophecy ==
The Great Prophecy was first introduced in The Sea of Monsters and its exact wording in The Last Olympian. It is referred to as the reason why Zeus, Poseidon, and Hades made a pact to no longer sire any more children after World War II. It states that when a child of one of those three turns sixteen, they will make a decision that will either save or destroy Olympus. The prophecy itself is in iambic tetrameter.

"A half-blood of the eldest gods
Shall reach sixteen against all odds
And see the world in endless sleep
The hero's soul, cursed blade shall reap
A single choice shall end his days
Olympus to preserve or raze"

It was first thought that it was only referring to one half-blood, but it is revealed in The Last Olympian to be referring to two—Percy Jackson (the half-blood), and Luke Castellan (the hero).

== Reception ==
The New York Times called the novel "both exciting and entertaining." While the review notes that the pace sometimes bordered on "frantic," distracting from weaker plot points, the book as a whole remains "clever" and "enjoyably hair-raising." Common Sense Media warned parents that this final book in the series contains more violence than the previous entries, but praised the book overall, giving it five out of five stars. Kirkus Reviews reviewed the book positively, observing that "Riordan masterfully orchestrates the huge cast of characters and manages a coherent, powerful tale at once exciting, philosophical and tear-jerking."

== Main characters ==
- Percy Jackson – The protagonist and narrator of Percy Jackson & the Olympians. He is aged fifteen in The Last Olympian, the son of Poseidon. Like Luke and Achilles he bathes in the River Styx and becomes invincible. He begins a romantic relationship with Annabeth Chase on his sixteenth birthday near the end of the book and even scores an underwater kiss.
- Luke Castellan – A 23-year-old demigod son of Hermes who willingly gave his body to Kronos out of hatred for the Olympian gods. Although he is an antagonist throughout the series, he sacrifices himself in order to destroy Kronos at the end of the book and is, in a way, the actual hero of the Great Prophecy.
- Kronos – The former king of the Titans, bent on restoring his rule and taking revenge on the gods who deposed him. After Luke sacrifices himself to defeat Kronos, Hermes states that although Titans cannot die, any more than the gods can, Kronos' essence is hopefully spread so thin that he can never form a consciousness again let alone a body.
- Annabeth Chase – Daughter of Athena, Percy's love interest and eventual girlfriend, and an aspiring architect.
- Ethan Nakamura – An ally of Kronos and son of Nemesis, without whom Kronos's rise to power would not have been possible. Like Luke, he too feels betrayed by the Greek gods for their refusal to acknowledge his mother as a goddess equal in importance to the twelve Olympians.
- Grover Underwood – Percy's best friend, a satyr, and a new member of the Council of Cloven Elders. He is also a kind of ambassador for the power of the god Pan in the world.
- Thalia Grace – A daughter of Zeus, Percy's close friend, and leader of a group of Artemis's followers, previously believed to be the demigod of the Great Prophecy. She is immortal but physically aged to fifteen, nearly sixteen.
- Nico di Angelo – A son of Hades who is instrumental in convincing his father, Demeter, and Persephone to fight against the Titans. He betrays Percy at first, but is eventually forgiven by him.
- Charles Beckendorf and Silena Beauregard – A couple who both give their lives in defense of Olympus; Beckendorf's death at Luke's hands convinces Silena to renounce her role as Kronos's spy. They are the son of Hephaestus and the daughter of Aphrodite, respectively.
- Clarisse La Rue – A daughter of Ares, and a rival of Percy's. At first, due to a disagreement with Apollo's cabin at Camp Half-Blood, she and her brethren refuse to fight in the war. Her friend Silena Beauregard's death, in part because of her refusal to fight, changes her mind.
- Connor and Travis Stoll – The sons of Hermes and friends of Percy. Everyone thinks that they are twins because they seem to be identical but they are not. They like to steal things from camp and love pranks. They have a rivalry with the head counselor of the Demeter Cabin, Katie Gardener.

== Sequel ==
Another Camp Half-Blood Chronicles series has been released, titled The Heroes of Olympus. The Lost Hero is the first book in this series by Riordan, and was released on October 12, 2010. Though it is not directly related to Percy and friends, there are many references and appearances of these characters and it still serves as a sequel. Its sequel, The Son of Neptune, portrays Percy as one of the main protagonists. The Son of Neptune is followed by The Mark of Athena, The House of Hades, and The Blood of Olympus.

A sixth book in the Percy Jackson & the Olympians series, titled The Chalice of the Gods and set between the events of The Heroes of Olympus and its sequel series The Trials of Apollo, was announced in October 2022, with a release date of September 26, 2023.
