= Good Deed Entertainment =

Brief biography for the Ohio-based production and distribution company

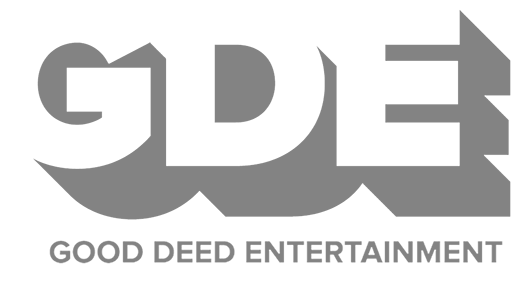
- Industry: Entertainment
- Founded: 2012; 14 years ago
- Founder: Scott Donley
- Headquarters: Ashland, Ohio, United States
- Products: Film production, distribution
- Website: gooddeedentertainment.com

Good Deed Entertainment (GDE) is an American independent film studio founded in 2012 by Scott Donley. Through its genre division Cranked Up Films, GDE develops, produces, and distributes horror, grounded sci-fi and speculative fiction films.

The company also operates Cranked Up TV, a streaming service for independent horror films.

The company is perhaps best known for releasing the Academy Award-nominated animated feature Loving Vincent, telling the story of painter Vincent van Gogh in his signature style. Good Deed Entertainment has also recently released such titles as Karmalink, Carmen and Some Freaks, along with the Independent Spirit Award-nominated To Dust and the Annie Award-nominated Charlotte.

== History ==
The company moved from its original home in Los Angeles, California, in 2019 to Ashland, Ohio, which is also the hometown of the company's founder, Scott Donley.

== Filmography ==
Films released by Good Deed Entertainment
Release date	Title	Director	Synopsis	Notes	Ref.
January 1, 2017	Never a Neverland	Ricky Norris	Never a Neverland documents the reality of a kingdom moving towards extinction and the hope of a people working to ensure that Swaziland never becomes a 'Neverland'.		
February 3, 2017	Growing Up Smith	Frank Lotito	In 1979, an Indian family moves to America with hopes of living the American Dream. While their 10-year-old boy Smith falls head-over-heels for the girl next door, his desire to become a "good old boy" propels him further away from his family's ideals than ever before.		
March 15, 2017	All Nighter	Gavin Wiesen	A workaholic father who attempts to visit his daughter during a layover in LA, only to discover that she's disappeared, is forced to team up with her awkward ex-boyfriend to find her over the course of one transformative night.		
August 4, 2017	Some Freaks	Ian MacAllister McDonald	A charming romance develops between a boy with one eye and an overweight girl, though when she loses her weight after going to college, their relationship is tested in devastating ways they never dreamed would happen.		
October 6, 2017	So B. It	Stephen Gyllenhaal	A young girl named Heidi, who lives with her mentally disabled mother, travels across the country to find out about her and her mother's past.		
January 16, 2018	Loving Vincent	Dorota Kobiela, Hugh Welchman	The life and controversial death of Vincent Van Gogh told by his paintings and by the characters that inhabit them. The intrigue unfolds through interviews with the characters closest to Vincent and through dramatic reconstructions of the events leading up to his death.	Oscar Nomination for Best Animated Feature in 2018 22 Wins and 51 nominations including The Oscars, Golden Globes and BAFTA awards.	
January 26, 2018	American Folk	David Heinz	When their plane is grounded on the morning of 9/11, strangers Elliot and Joni are unexpectedly thrust together on a cross-country road trip in a rusty old 1972 Chevy van. During their journey the pair discover what they have in common- a love for old folk songs. They raise their voices and re-discover the healing nature of music, managing to lift themselves and others up in the wake of tragedy.		
February 9, 2018	Permission	Brian Crano	A woman on the brink of a marriage proposal is told by a friend that she should date other men before spending the rest of her life with her boyfriend.		
March 16, 2018	Journey's End	Saul Dibb	The Great War – March,1918. C-company arrives to take its turn in the front-line trenches of northern France, led by war weary Captain Stanhope. With a German offensive imminently approaching, the company anxiously awaits their unknown fate.		
August 10, 2018	Always At the Carlyle	Matthew Miele	While the walls at The Carlyle Hotel don't talk, they definitely whisper. Hear the untold stories of this legendary hotel as heard from the mouths of its own employees and top clientele, including George Clooney, Harrison Ford, Sofia Coppola, Anthony Bourdain, Wes Anderson, Jon Hamm, Elaine Stritch, and more.		
October 12, 2018	After Everything	Hannah Marks, Joey Power	Elliot is a young and carefree New Yorker whose world gets turned upside down when he finds out that he has cancer. He soon finds comfort and happiness when he falls in love with Mia, a woman who sticks with him through the hard times.	2018 SXSW Award winner	
April 19, 2019	Breaking Habits	Robert Ryan	Nuns, guns and cannabis. Meet Sister Kate, former high-flying corporate executive, reborn rebel and founder of Sisters of the Valley, California’s fastest growing marijuana farm, providing medical cannabis to those in need. This is her journey to becoming a voice for the unheard, and possibly the most feared nun in the world.		
May 3, 2019	Tell It to the Bees	Annabel Jenkel	Dr. Jean Markham (Anna Paquin) returns to the town she left as a teenager to take over her late father’s medical practice. When a school-yard scuffle lands Charlie (Gregor Selkirk) in her surgery, she invites him to visit the hives in her garden and tell his secrets to the bees, as she once did. The new friendship between the boy and the bee keeper brings his mother Lydia (Holliday Grainger) into Jean’s world.In the sanctuary of the doctor’s house, the two women find themselves drawn to one another in a way that Jean recognizes and fears, and Lydia could never have expected. But, in 1950’s small-town Britain, their new secret can't stay hidden forever.	World premiered as a special presentation at the 2018 TIFF Based on the highly acclaimed novel by author Fiona Shaw	
May 3, 2019	To Dust	Shawn Snyder	Shmuel, a Hasidic cantor in New York distraught by the untimely death of his wife, struggles to find religious solace while secretly obsessing over how her body will decay. As a clandestine partnership develops with Albert, a local college biology professor, the two embark on a darkly comic and increasingly literal undertaking into the underworld.	2020 Independent Spirit Award nomination for Best Screenplay 2018 Tribeca Film Festival – Audience Award Winner, Narrative & Best New Narrative Director.	
July 7, 2019	Storm Boy	Shawn Seet	Based on the beloved book, "Storm Boy" is a highly emotional tale of a young boy growing up on the beautiful but uninhabited coastline of Southern Australia who unexpectedly rescues and then raises three orphaned pelicans. When he forms a close bond with them, he finds himself at odds with his fisherman father and his life takes a new and unexpected turn.		
July 9, 2019	Loving Vincent: The Impossible Dream	Miki Wecel	Loving Vincent: The Impossible Dream recalls a 10-year journey that brought the world's first fully painted feature film to the cinema screen. The potential for a truly groundbreaking yet completely unseen project seemed like a huge risk, but when in the hands of two passionate filmmakers willing to risk everything to make their impossible dream come true, nothing could stand in their way.	60-minute doc about the making of the 2018 Oscar nominated film	
July 12, 2019	Firecrackers	Jasmin Mozaffari	Firecrackers tells the story of Lou (Michaela Kurimsky) and her best friend Chantal (Karena Evans) as they plan to get out of their isolated, run-down town and move to a city far, far away. When Chantal’s unstable and possessive ex violates her during a night of partying, the girls decide to exact their revenge on him through a night of vandalism and debauchery. The consequences of their actions are devastating, threatening the girls’ chances of ever leaving	World premiered at the 2018 Toronto International Film Festival where Kurimsky was named 2018 TIFF Rising Star	
August 16, 2019	This Changes Everything	Tom Donahue	Told first-hand by some of Hollywood's leading voices behind and in front of the camera, THIS CHANGES EVERYTHING is a feature-length documentary that uncovers what is beneath one of the most confounding dilemmas in the entertainment industry – the underrepresentation and misrepresentation of women. It takes an incisive look at the history, empirical evidence, and systemic forces that foster gender discrimination and thus reinforce disparity in our culture. Most importantly, the film seeks pathways and solutions from within and outside the industry, and around the world.		
April 24, 2020	Enemy Lines	Anders Banke	November 1943. A British commando squad is teamed with an American officer on a covert mission into Poland, deep behind enemy lines. Working with the resistance they cross the harsh wilderness intent on extracting a sought-after Polish scientist, Dr Fabian, from the Germans. Fabian is known to hold information on secret innovations that would prove vital to the Allied efforts. With a German unit on their tail and a Russian squad also intent on kidnapping Fabian for their own ends, it becomes a race against time, that for the winners, will change the shape of the war.		
August 11, 2020	Lucky Grandma	Sasie Sealy	Set in New York City, an ornery, chain-smoking Chinese Grandma goes all in at the casino, landing herself on the wrong side of luck...and in the middle of a Chinatown gang war.		
November 6, 2020	Major Arcana	Josh Melrod	A carpenter struggles to move beyond his troubled past when he returns to his hometown to mend relationships and finds solace in building a log cabin by hand.		
August 27, 2021	Summertime	Carlos Lopez Estrada	Over the course of a hot summer day in Los Angeles, the lives of 25 young Angelenos intersect. A skating guitarist, a tagger, two wannabe rappers, an exasperated fast-food worker, a limo driver—they all weave in and out of each other’s stories. Through poetry they express life, love, heartache, family, home, and fear. One of them just wants to find someplace that still serves good cheeseburgers.	Opening Night Film at the 2020 Sundance Film Festival	
November 23, 2021	Ma Belle, My Beauty	Marion Hill	A surprise reunion in the South of France reignites passions and jealousies between two women who were formerly polyamorous lovers.	2021 Sundance Film Festival NEXT Audience Award Winner! 2021 SXSW Film Festival Favorites Selection	
February 11, 2022	Cosmic Dawn	Jefferson Moneo	After witnessing the alien abduction of her mother as a child, Aurora joins the UFO cult "The Cosmic Dawn". Now moved on from the cult, Aurora is forced to confront her past and pursue the ultimate truth about The Cosmic Dawn.	Featuring music by Grammy Award-winning artist MGMT	
March 11, 2022	Moon Manor	Machete Bang Bang, Erin Granat	Today is Jimmy's last day alive. His Alzheimer's is worsening, so he's decided to die like he has lived - with intention, humor, and zest. In his last day on Earth, Jimmy will show an obituary writer, his death doula, his estranged brother, his caretaker, a surreal being, and the guests at his fabulous FUN-eral, that perhaps the art of living is the art of dying.		
April 8, 2022	Alaskan Nets	Jeff Harasimowicz	Metlakatla is Alaska's last Native Indian reserve. For hundreds of years two distinct traditions have defined their community- fishing and basketball. Watch as two cousins lead their local High School team toward a shot at their first state championship in over 30 years. In the aftermath of an unimaginable tragedy, a basketball title has the ability to breathe new life back into this small town.	Exec Produced by Chris Pratt	
April 27, 2022	Bleeding Audio	Chelsea Christer	Bleeding Audio is an intimate portrait detailing The Matches' promising career, defeating break up, and inspiring reunion as they reflect on what success truly means for musicians in today's digital industry.		
June 3, 2022	Charlotte	Tahir Rana, Eric Warin	The true story of Charlotte Salomon, a young German-Jewish artist who comes of age on the eve of the Second World War and defies incredible odds to create a timeless masterpiece.	Official Selection at TIFF 2021	
June 17, 2022	Guidance	Neysan Sobhani	During a trip to the country, a young couple use Guidance, a device made to create enlightened people. But, as time passes, they subvert Guidance to manipulate and lie—hoping to save what they are afraid of losing the most: each other.		
July 15, 2022	Karmalink	Jake Wachtel	In this Buddhist sci-fi mystery set in near-future Phnom Penh, a young Cambodian detective untangles a link between her friend's past-life dreams of a lost gold artifact and a neuroscientist's determination to attain digital enlightenment.	Best Picture nominee at the 2021 Venice Film Festival	
September 23, 2022	Carmen	Valerie Buhagiar	In a small Mediterranean village, Carmen has looked after her brother, the local priest, for her entire life. After he dies Carmen begins to see the world, and herself, in a new light.	Best Feature Winner at the Canadian Film Fest 2022	
October 7, 2022	Billy Flanigan: The Happiest Man On Earth	Cullen Douglas	The inspiring journey of Walt Disney World legend Billy Flanigan from his daunted childhood to a life free of fear, shame, and secrets all while brightening lives - one Flanigram at a time.		
November 4, 2022	The Manhattan Project	Matthew Campanile	When a small-town cocktail-enthusiast decides to kill himself after being diagnosed with a terminal illness he must deal with the repercussion his choice has on his son and his community.		
November 29, 2022	I Heard Sarah	Kymberly Harris	A troubled rockstar escapes mandated rehab in a desperate attempt to confront his deepest demons.		
December 2, 2022	Ashgrove	Jeremy LaLonde	Set in the not-so-distant future, Dr. Jennifer Ashgrove - one of the world's top scientists - is battling to find a cure to a crisis that affects the world's water supply. As the weight of the world takes its toll, she retreats to the countryside with her husband in a bid to clear her mind. But their relationship is strained, and they soon realize that their ability to save their marriage will literally determine the fate of humankind itself.		
December 9, 2022	Looking For Her	Alexandra Swarens	When her family guilt-trips her into going home for the holidays with her girlfriend, Taylor concedes, but there's one little problem: they broke up. Not wanting her family to know, Taylor hires an actress to pose as her girlfriend.		
January 6, 2023	Running With Speed	Patrick Lope, Nicholas Mross	Running with Speed is a feature that tells the fascinatingly peculiar story of how the fastest video game players in the world raise millions of dollars to help doctors and fight cancer.	Narrated by Gaming YouTuber Summoning Salt	
February 24, 2023	Rosebud Lane	John Lacy	When a middle aged Hollywood filmmaker receives an unexpected card from his young son whom he has never met, he makes the difficult decision to go see him in the Blue Ridge Mountains of North Carolina. Both of their lives then take a life-altering turn as drama surrounding the boy’s mother unfolds in the small mountain town.		
April 7, 2023	The Year of the Dog	Michael Peterson, Andrew McGinn, Rob Grabow	Matt, a loner alcoholic, struggles to maintain sobriety and honor his mother's dying wish to see him get sober. His AA sponsor offers him refuge at his farm where Matt finds Yup'ik, a stray husky with a unique talent. Their relationship struggles at first, but with the help of their Montana community, the two strays find a connection and discover what it takes to pull thru to the finish line.		
May 5, 2023	You Can Live Forever	Mark Slutsky, Sarah Watts	When lesbian teen Jaime is sent to live in a Jehovah's Witness community, she falls hard for a devout Witness girl and the two embark on an intense affair with consequences that will reshape the rest of their lives.	Official Selection 2022 Tribeca Film Festival	
May 23, 2023	Days Of Daisy	Alexander Jeffery	Daisy, a 39 year old good-natured librarian, desperately wants to have a baby. She meets Jack, the creative man of her dreams only to find out he does not want to have children.		
June 16, 2023	Midday Black Midnight Blue	Samantha Soule, Daniel Talbott	Isolated in an empty house, Ian remains in grief over the loss of a woman he loved who died two decades ago. The memory clamoring to be released, and his daily existence turning ever darker, Ian will have to find a way to let her go.		
November 23, 2023	Always Lola	Jeffrey Crane Graham	After popular high school senior Lola dies, her five best friends, now college aged, reunite on their annual camping trip only to discover shocking secrets around her death that threaten to destroy her memory and their friend group.		
September 12, 2025	Looking Through Water	Roberto Sneider	In an attempt to mend their broken relationship, a man invites his estranged son to compete in a father–son fishing competition in Puerto Rico.		

== Cranked Up Films ==
Cranked Up is a genre subdivision of GDE that focuses on developing, producing, acquiring and distributing high-concept horror, thrillers, grounded sci-fi, and speculative fiction. Along with GDE, the company headquarters moved to Ashland, OH to bring film production to Ohio while being conveniently nestled between Cleveland and Columbus.

Films released by Cranked Up
Release date	Title	Director	Synopsis	Notes	Ref.
September 14, 2018	Don't Leave Home	Michael Tully	An American artist's obsession with a disturbing urban legend leads her to an investigation of the story's origins at the crumbling estate of a reclusive painter in Ireland.		
June 21, 2019	Nightmare Cinema	Mick Garris (The Stand) Joe Dante (Gremlins, Salem) David Slade (30 Days of Night) Ryuhei Kitamura (Midnight Meat Train) Alejandro Brugues (Juan of the Dead)	In this twisted horror anthology, five strangers are drawn to an abandoned theater and forced to watch their deepest and darkest fears play out before them. Lurking in the shadows is the Projectionist, who preys upon their souls with his collection of disturbing films. As each reel spins its sinister tale, the characters find frightening parallels to their own lives.	Premiered as the Opening Night film at the 2018 Fantasia Film Festival	
August 8, 2019	Coyote Lake	Sara Seligman	Ester and her overbearing mother run a small bed-and-breakfast near the US/Mexico border. One night, two unwanted guests arrive, threatening the safety of everyone. But the two women are hiding a secret, one that may prove the most dangerous of all.		
September 13, 2019	Riot Girls	Jovanka Vuckovic	After all the adults are wiped out from a mysterious disease, the surviving kids split into two groups: the have-not Eastsiders and the tyrannical Westside Titans. When one of their own is captured by the Titans, it’s up to punk rockers and best friends Nat and Scratch to lead the East side teens on a deadly high-octane mission that forever alters the future of Potter's Bluff.		
February 14, 2020	After Midnight	Jeremy Gardner, Christian Stella	When his long-suffering girlfriend disappears suddenly, leaving a cryptic note as her only explanation, Hank's comfortable life and his sanity begin to crack. Then, from the woods surrounding his house, something terrible starts trying to break in.		
May 1, 2020	Extra Ordinary	Mike Ahern, Enda Loughman	Rose, a mostly sweet & lonely small-town driving instructor, must use her supernatural talents to save the daughter of Martin (also mostly sweet & lonely) from a washed-up rock star who is using her in a Satanic pact to re-ignite his fame.	Grand Jury Award Nominee at the 2019 SXSW Film Festival	
May 8, 2020	Porno	Keola Racela	Four repressed, religious teens and a straight-edge projectionist working at a small-town movie theater in the 1990s discover a secret screening room filled with vintage X-rated exploitation films. Playing one of the old film reels unleashes a succubus named Lilith, who attempts to seduce each of them in order to steal their souls.	Grand Jury Award Nominee at SXSW in 2019	
July 31, 2020	Tijuana Jackson: Purpose Over Prison	Romany Malco	A stubborn ex-convict on parole is set on becoming a world-renowned motivational speaker. Two things stand in his way: his attitude and his no-nonsense parole officer.		
September 18, 2020	Alive	Rob Grant	A severely injured man and woman awake in an abandoned sanitarium only to discover that a sadistic caretaker holds the keys to their freedom and the horrific answers as to their real identity.		
December 4, 2020	Survival Skills	Quinn Armstrong	Survival Skills is a lost training video from the 1980s. In it, Jim, the perfect policeman in a perfect relationship in a perfect community, gets in over his head when he tries to resolve a domestic violence case. Before long, the ugly underbelly of the ‘Good Guys in Blue’ begins to expose itself and Jim decides to take matters into his own hands.		
February 12, 2021	I Blame Society	Gillian Wallace Horvat	A struggling filmmaker senses her peers are losing faith in her ability to succeed, so she decides to prove herself by finishing her last abandoned film....and committing the perfect murder.		
May 7, 2021	15 Things You Didn't Know About Bigfoot	Zach Lamplugh	In order to write this latest masterpiece, Brian must trade Brooklyn for the mountains of North Georgia. Guided by cryptid rock-star Jeffrey Stephenson, Brian sees something that can't be explained. What started out as a wild goose chase for Bigfoot becomes the story of a lifetime.		
June 15, 2021	American Badger	Kirk Caouette	When the lives of a troubled prostitute and an unhinged stranger intertwine, lost in lust, they embark on a violent vigilante's path filled with promises and lies.		
November 12, 2021	Double Walker	Colin West	A little girl is found dead on Christmas Day in a small midwestern town. That same night a mysterious young woman moves to town who is revealed to be none other than the ghost of the little girl, determined to piece together the vague memories of her own demise.		
December 3, 2021	This Game's Called Murder	Adam Sherman	The movie follows the daughter of iconic women’s luxury footwear designer Mr. Wallendorf, who sabotages her sadistic father’s business in a dark tale of murder, greed, and betrayal based in a consumer-crazed society.		
August 19, 2022	Squeal	Aik Karapetian	Lost in a remote part of Eastern Europe, Sam is a foreigner searching for his biological father when a minor road accident leads to a chance meeting with a pig-farmer's daughter, who captures him, making him a slave on the farm.		
September 30, 2022	After She Died	Jack Dignan	A grieving teenager is horrified to discover that her father's new girlfriend looks identical to her dead mother.		
November 11, 2022	Residents of Arcadia	Dom Cutrupi	Two social media influencers and entrepreneurs have their perfect lives disrupted when a man breaks into their backyard. As a mysterious countdown appears on screens and mirrors throughout their home, the ideal couple struggles to maintain their ideal life.		
January 20, 2023	How to Rob	Peter Horgan	Sean Price and Jimmy Winters are a two man stick up crew, robbing criminals from Boston to Cape Cod. Sean wants out of the game but it's not so simple when a couple of killers are hunting them for retribution over a past robbery.		
February 3, 2023	TwoTwo	Jun Hoskulds	Socially awkward David appears to have the perfect life, until he loses his corporate job and is faced with eviction. After hitting rock bottom, he wakes up in an alleyway where a homeless man promises him a way to change his life. It sounds too good to be true but with nothing to lose, he takes up the man’s offer. Everything appears the same; then through a chance encounter with a mysterious young woman on the run called 22 – “TwoTwo” to her friends – David discovers her unusual ability to manifest reality as she conceives it, and their futures become intertwined.		
March 31, 2023	Capsules	Luke Momo	After experimenting with mysterious substances, four chem students find themselves addicted in the worst way possible: they'll die unless they take more.		
April 21, 2023	God's Petting You	Jamie Patterson	A heroin addict falls in love with a struggling sex addict, and together the pair hatch a plan to steal a small fortune from a porn star.		
April 28, 2023	Morgan's Mask	Trevor Rigby	Stuck inside during quarantine, a cosplayer's world begins to fall apart. With nowhere to go, she turns within to find life answers.		
May 10, 2024	Foil	Zach Green	An unusual piece of foil with potential alien origin causes a rift between two former best friends camping in the California desert		
Upcoming Films
June 27, 2023	What Is Art	Danny Abbott, Daniel Fissmer, Jarad Kopciak, Arlo Sanders	What Is Art is an anthological absurdist comedy voyage that takes viewers on a trip through space, time, and really cool houses – all in search of the answer to the ultimate question: what is art?		
July 14, 2023	Cult of Nightmares	David Paul Scott	An insomnia medication with dark ties to the military causes nightmarish side effects with global implications.		
July 18, 2023	Half Sisters	Devin Fei-Fan Tau	After the death of their grandmother, two estranged half sisters reunite at a remote family cabin in the midst of a raging storm. Learning that a $1M inheritance is at stake, the two women become reluctant allies in the search, facing down multiple threats — both internal and external.		

=== Cranked Up TV ===
In September 2024, Cranked Up Films announced Cranked Up TV, a subscription video on demand service focused on independent horror films, which launched later that year. The service carries the Cranked Up Films catalog alongside original and exclusive titles. At launch, the company said original productions would include Nightmare Cinema, Extra Ordinary, and the Fresh Hell trilogy. Later originals include Wormtown (2025) and Blood & Rust (2026), which premiered on the service in May 2026. The service is available on Roku, Apple TV, Fire TV, Android TV, and other platforms.
