= Lauren Lyle =

British Scottish-born actress

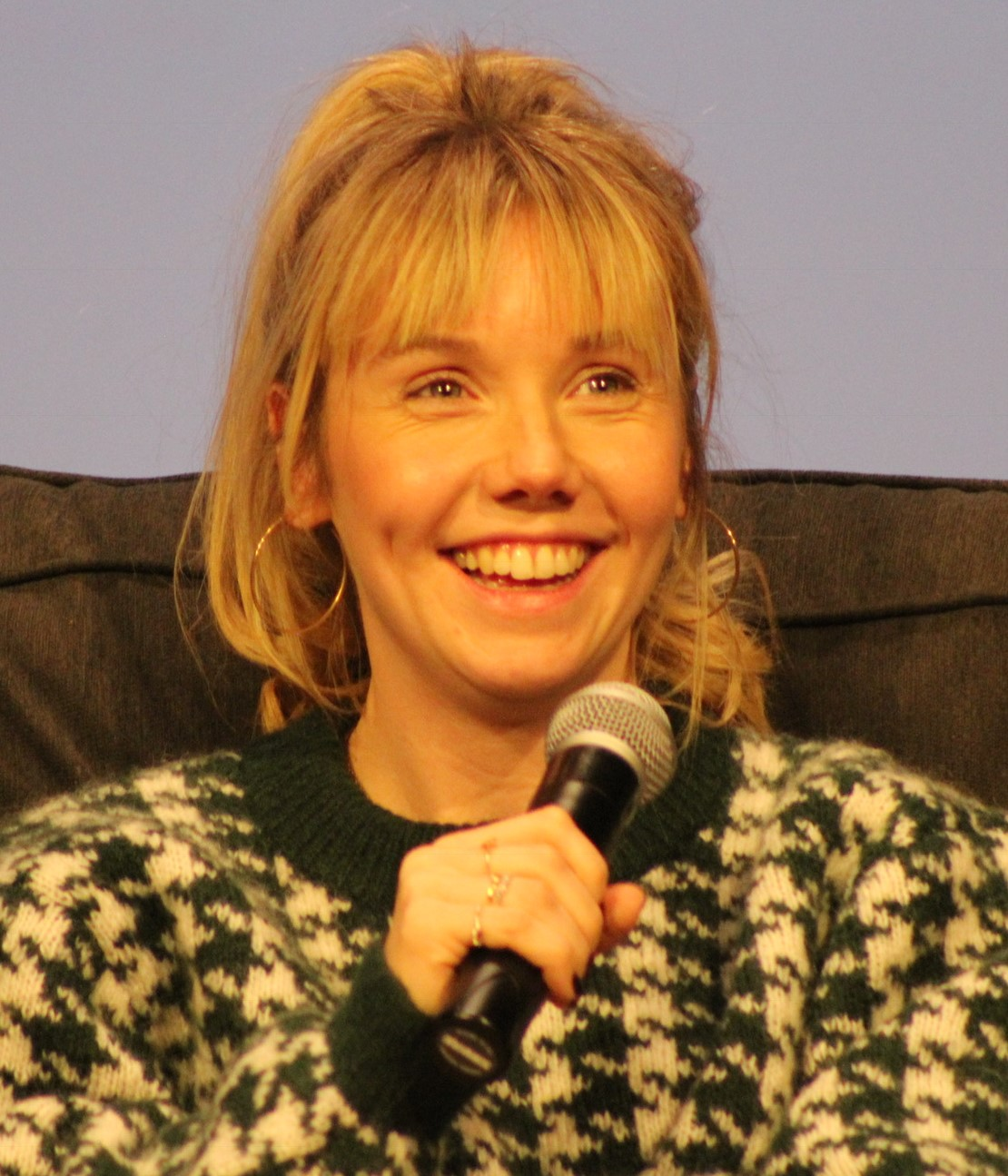
- Lyle in 2018
- Born: 12. July 1993; Glasgow, Scotland
- Education: National Youth Theatre
- Occupation: Actress
- Years active: 2013–present

Lauren Lyle is a Scottish actress best known for her main role as Marsali MacKimmie Fraser in the Starz television drama Outlander, and peace protester Jade Antoniak in the BBC drama Vigil. Since 2022, Lyle has played the award-winning leading role in the ITV crime thriller Karen Pirie. She is 5'3 or 160cm tall.

== Early life and education ==
After performing at the Edinburgh Fringe for Fourth Monkey and on stage in London in The Crucible at the Old Vic, Lyle was accepted into the National Youth Theatre's REP Company in 2015. This programme offers free training for selected students based on the repertory theatre model.

== Career ==
Lyle's first professional role was in 2014 when she appeared in the critically acclaimed production of Arthur Miller's The Crucible, directed by Yael Farber at the Old Vic Theatre in London's West End.

In 2015, Lyle was accepted to the National Youth Theatre's repertory programme, performing in three plays during the season. She appeared as Catherine in Wuthering Heights, Diane in Consensual, and the Prince of Arragon in Shakespeare's The Merchant of Venice.

Her first television appearance, on BBC Three's BBC Comedy Feeds, saw Lyle appearing in a series four episode entitled "Radges". Long-running medical drama Holby City featured Lyle as Katherine Rice in the Series 18 episode "Who You Are" (2016). From there she featured in a three-episode stint, opposite Sean Bean, in the BBC drama Broken.

In 2017, Lyle debuted in the recurring role of Marsali MacKimmie Fraser in Starz's hit time travel drama Outlander, based on Diana Gabaldon's best-selling book series of the same name. Returning to her roots at the National Youth Theatre, Lyle appeared in the television documentary Stage Direction to discuss her experiences with the program.

In 2018 Lyle starred in the film adaptation of Fiona Shaw's novel Tell It to the Bees, opposite Anna Paquin and Holliday Grainger, and Lily Rose Thomas' debut short film Girls Who Drink.

In early 2020, Lyle began hosting the podcast She's a Rec'. In each episode, she interviews a female guest about the "albums, films, books and female heroes" that have had the most influence in their lives.

In 2021 Lyle appeared in the BBC crime drama Vigil. She portrayed Jade Antoniak, a peace protester and the girlfriend of Martin Compston’s character Craig Burke. The show, which is set on a ballistic missile submarine, gained over 10.2 million views in the first seven days, making it the BBC's most-watched show of the year.

In 2022 and 2025, Lyle starred as investigator Detective Sergeant Karen Pirie in both of the ITV murder drama series Karen Pirie. Set in St. Andrews in the Kingdom of Fife, the series is based on author Val McDermid’s novel The Distant Echo.

== Filmography ==
=== Film ===
| Year | Title | Role | Notes |
|---|---|---|---|
| 2013 | WhosApp | Grace Timms | Short film |
| 2014 | The Crucible | Ensemble | Film of The Old Vic play |
| 2014 | Office Ugetsu | Annie | Short film |
| 2015 | ...and You're Back in the Room | Sister | Short film; also writer |
| 2015 | The New Hope | Damsel | |
| 2018 | Tell It to the Bees | Annie Cranmer | |
| 2018 | Girls Who Drink | Georgia | Short film |
| 2018 | Lara | Sal | Short film |
| 2023 | Mercy Falls | Rhona | Also executive producer |
| 2024 | The Outrun | Julie | |
| 2024 | Something in the Water | Lizzie | |

=== Television ===
| Year | Title | Role | Notes |
|---|---|---|---|
| 2015 | Comedy Feeds | Lauren | Series 4; episode 3: "Radges" |
| 2016 | Holby City | Katherine Rice | Series 18; episode 24: "Who You Are" |
| 2017 | Broken | Chloe Demichelis | Episodes 4–6: "Roz", "Carl" & "Father Michael" |
| 2017–2026 | Outlander | Marsali MacKimmie Fraser | Series 3–8; 25 episodes |
| 2021 | Vigil | Jade Antoniak | Series 1; episodes 1–4 |
| 2022 | Celebrity Page | Herself | Season 9; episodes 53 & 87 |
| 2022, 2025 | Karen Pirie | DS Karen Pirie | Series 1; episodes 1–3, & series 2; episodes 1–3 |
| 2025 | Toxic Town | Dani Holliday | Episodes 3 & 4 |
| 2025 | The Bombing of Pan Am 103 | June McCusker | Mini-series; episodes 1–6 |
| 2025 | The Ridge | Mia | Main Role |

=== Theatre ===
| Year | Title | Role | Director | Theatre |
|---|---|---|---|---|
| 2014 | The Crucible | Ensemble | Yaël Farber | The Old Vic Theatre |
| 2015 | Wuthering Heights | Catherine Earnshaw | Emily Lin | Ambassadors Theatre |
| 2015 | Consensual | Diane | Pia Furtado | Ambassadors Theatre |
| 2015 | Merchant of Venice | Prince of Arragon | Anna Niland | Ambassadors Theatre |

=== Podcast ===
| Year | Title | Production | Notes |
|---|---|---|---|
| 2020 | She's a Rec' | Lauren Lyle | 11 Episodes |

== Accolades ==
At the BAFTA Scotland Awards in November 2023, Lyle was awarded Best Actress Television for Karen Pirie and the Audience Award for Favourite Scot on Screen.
