= The Ridge (TV series) =

British television series

- Genre: Psychological thriller; Drama; Mystery
- Created by: Nora Chassler; David Murdoch
- Developed by: Jess Sayer; Alan Campbell
- Written by: Nora Chassler; Kate McDermott; Jess Sayer; Douglas Mackinnon; David Murdoch; Alan Campbell
- Directed by: Douglas Mackinnon; Robyn Grace
- Starring: Lauren Lyle; Jay Ryan
- Composers: Dream Chambers; Arli Liberman
- Countries of origin: United Kingdom; New Zealand
- Original language: English
- No. of series: 1
- No. of episodes: 6

Production
- Executive producers: Philip Smith; Cate Calver; Kathleen Anderson; David Murdoch; Douglas Mackinnon; Marc Lorber; Erik Pack; Kieran Hannigan; Thomas Robins; Gavin Smith
- Producers: Angela Murray; Steven Zanoski
- Cinematography: Peter McCaffrey
- Editors: Simon Starling; Nick Carew
- Production companies: Boat Rocker Studios; Great Southern Television; Sinner Films

Original release
- Network: BBC Scotland; BBC Two; (United Kingdom); Sky Open; (New Zealand)
- Release: 21 October 2025 – present

The Ridge is a 2025 television series created by Nora Chassler and David Murdoch that is set in Scotland and New Zealand, and stars Lauren Lyle and Jay Ryan. It was first broadcast on BBC Scotland in Scotland and on Sky Open in New Zealand on 21 October 2025, followed by BBC Two in the United Kingdom on 23 October 2025.

== Premise ==
A Glaswegian woman with a troubled past visits New Zealand for a wedding but encounters a tragic mystery.

== Cast and characters ==
- Lauren Lyle as Mia Beaton
- Jay Ryan as Ewan Carpenter
- Florence Hartigan as Sergeant Libby Grimes
- Connor Amor-Bendall as Cassy Beaton
- David Van Horn as Harry Grimes
- Kauri Williams as Teddy Wilson
- Beth Alexander as Natalie
- Mabel Strachan as young Mia
- Isla Mercer as young Cassy
- Dulcie Smart as Annot
- Chloe Parker as Sadie Grimes
- Taqi Nazeer as Riz Chopra
- Caleb Nazzer as Josh
- Joe Dekkers-Reihana as Eru
- Katherine McRae as Mrs. Wilson
- Aroha Rawson as Mrs. Olsen
- Claire Dargo as Gloria
- Caitlin MacTavish as Ava
- Cora Bissett as Jacky Poole

== Production ==
The series was announced when BBC Scotland and New Zealand broadcasting company Sky New Zealand commissioned a six-part psychological thriller series entitled The Ridge with Scottish television production outfit Sinner Films and New Zealand production company Great Southern Television would serve as co-producers of the six-part thriller television series whilst Paris-based French global sales distribution company Oble had brought international distribution rights to the upcoming series.

By December 2024, Canadian production studio Boat Rocker Studios had joined the upcoming New Zealand/Scottish six-part thriller series The Ridge as a co-producer and would replace French distribution company Oble as the former had taken over international distribution rights to the series.

The six-part series is written by Douglas Mackinnon, David Murdoch, Alan Campbell, Kate McDermott, Jess Sayer and Nora Chassler with Douglas Mackinnon as lead director and Robyn Grace as 2nd director on the series. The series is a co-production between BBC Scotland and Sky New Zealand with co-production from Great Southern Studios and Sinner Films alongside Canadian production outfit Boat Rocker Studios who would manage global distribution to the series. Douglas Mackinnon, Ivan Schneeberg, David Fortier, Jon Rutherford and Erik Pack are among the executive producers.

The cast is led by Lauren Lyle and Jay Ryan as well as Dulcie Smart, Florence Hartigan, Chloe Parker, David Van Horn, Taqi Nazeer, Claire Dargo and Cora Bissett.

Filming commenced in February 2025. Filming locations include Falkirk, Scotland and New Zealand. Seamer House at 162 Sunnyside Road, Coatesville, served as the New Zealand Manor the characters reside at. The house had previously been the set for the 2009 20th Century Fox movie Aliens in the Attic, with The Ridge taking advantage of much of the restoration work completed for Aliens in the Attic, such as various pieces of furniture.

== Broadcast ==
The series premiered on BBC Scotland on 21 October 2025 and BBC Two from 23 October.

== Critical reception ==
Ben Dowell of The Times wrote: "Often the writing across the six episodes is sublime. You really believe in this tiny place, even if there are more deceptions and sexual secrets here than in a medium-sized metropolis. This sure-footed, compelling show could well have you on the ridge of your seat."

Lucy Mangan of The Guardian wrote: "The inherent strangeness and wild beauty of the New Zealand setting add a dash of menace to every scene, a sense that anything might be possible if you take your eye off someone or something for a moment too long. The festering resentments of a small town, the secrets everyone knows and those just a few guard closely feel real and unnaturally potent. It is also bitterly funny, often in ways that make it achingly real and add to the melancholy at its heart."
