= Out of Bounds (McDermid novel) =

2016 crime drama novel by Val McDermid

- Author: Val McDermid
- Language: English
- Series: Karen Pirie
- Genre: Detective fiction
- Publisher: Little, Brown
- Publication date: 2016
- Publication place: Scotland
- Media type: Print
- Pages: 421
- ISBN: 978-1-4087-0691-6
- Preceded by: The Skeleton Road
- Followed by: Broken Ground

Out of Bounds is a 2016 crime drama novel by Scottish crime writer Val McDermid. The novel is set during 2016 but because the main detective is in the Historic Case Unit (HCU) the crimes being investigated were actually committed in 1994 and 1996.

== Synopsis ==
Detective Chief Inspector Karen Pirie walks the streets of Leith in the small hours. She cannot sleep as her lover and colleague, Phil Parhatka, was killed in the last outing in this series (The Skeleton Road) At night she encounters displaced Syrian refugees in alleyways and under bridges gathered together to try to be a community, as since coming to Scotland, they have nowhere to meet up.

In 2016, a group of joyriders crash their stolen vehicle and the driver ends up in intensive care. The DNA of the offender leads Pirie to an unsolved rape/murder of a hairdresser from Partick in 1996. Tina McDonald was on a night out with some friends in Glasgow when she disappeared from the group before being found dead the next morning.

A supposed suicide of Gabriel, a Kinross man, also leads to Karen unofficially opening a cold case on a 1994 aircraft crash. The aircraft contained 4 people, the pilot was an MP and one of the passengers was Gabriel's mother. It was always believed that an incendiary device had caused the aircraft to crash and that the IRA were responsible. As Karen digs deeper, she finds more and more and comes to believe that the terrorists were far from responsible.

Amongst all of this, Karen has to come to terms with Phil's death, worry about her colleague who makes errors in judgment and procedure, whilst combatting the open dislike that her superior, Assistant Chief Constable Lees, has for her. She tried to help the refugees.

== Critical reception ==
In The Press and Journal, Roddy Brooks noted the determination of the main character and said that McDermid was a writer at the height of her game.

David Knights, writing for the Keighley News, said that whilst the novel was a very satisfying police procedural, it lacked the tension of the Tony Hill novels and was not in the same league as A Place of Execution.

Janette Wolf, writing in The Independent, gave the book 3 stars out of 5. Wolf noted that DCI Pirie has a tendency to handout nicknames and that Pirie seemed to have a lot of obliging friends in the right places to get her access and information. That said, Wolf described the book as satisfyingly involved and compelling.
