= Place of Execution =

Place of execution may refer to:

- The site at which capital punishment is carried out
- A Place of Execution, a crime novel by Val McDermid first published in 1999
