= The Last Temptation =

The Last Temptation may refer to:

- "The Last Temptation" (The Ren & Stimpy Show), an episode of The Ren & Stimpy Show
- The Last Temptation (Alice Cooper album), 1994
- The Last Temptation (Ja Rule album), 2002
- The Last Temptation (novel), a 2002 crime novel by Val McDermid
- The Last Temptation of Christ (novel) or The Last Temptation, a 1955 novel by Nikos Kazantzakis
  - The Last Temptation of Christ (film), a 1988 film adaptation of the novel
- "Last Temptation" (House), a television episode
