= Dowler =

Dowler is a surname. Notable people with the surname include:

- Annabelle Dowler (born 1974), English actress
- Arthur Dowler KCB KBE (1895–1963), General Officer Commanding the East Africa Command of the British Army
- Beau Dowler (born 1987), former Australian rules footballer
- Boyd Dowler (born 1937), former professional football player, a wide receiver in the National Football League
- Brendan Dowler, OAM (born 1968), Australian wheelchair basketball player
- Caden Dowler (born 2003), American football player
- Jean Dowler (1926–1992), female Baseball catcher and pitcher
- Joseph Dowler (1879–1931), British tug of war competitor
- Lawrence Dowler (born 1954), American former competition swimmer
- Lorraine Dowler (born 1958), American geographer
- Maxine Crouse Dowler, teacher, administrator, director
- Mike Dowler, retired Welsh professional football goalkeeper
- Milly Dowler, 13-year-old English girl who was abducted in Walton-on-Thames, Surrey in 2002 and subsequently murdered
- Taco Dowler (born 2003), American football player
- Thomas Dowler (1903–1986), American football, basketball, and baseball player and coach of football and basketball
- William Dowler Morris (1857–1931), mayor of Ottawa, Canada in 1901

== See also ==
- Charles Dowler House, historic house at 581 Smith Street in Providence, Rhode Island
- W Dowler & Sons founded 1744 in Birmingham, a manufacturer of numerous goods, notably buttons, Vesta matches, hand bells, letter balances, swords, corkscrews and whistles
- Dower
- Owler
