= Jo Sharp =

Scottish geographer

Prof Jo Sharp
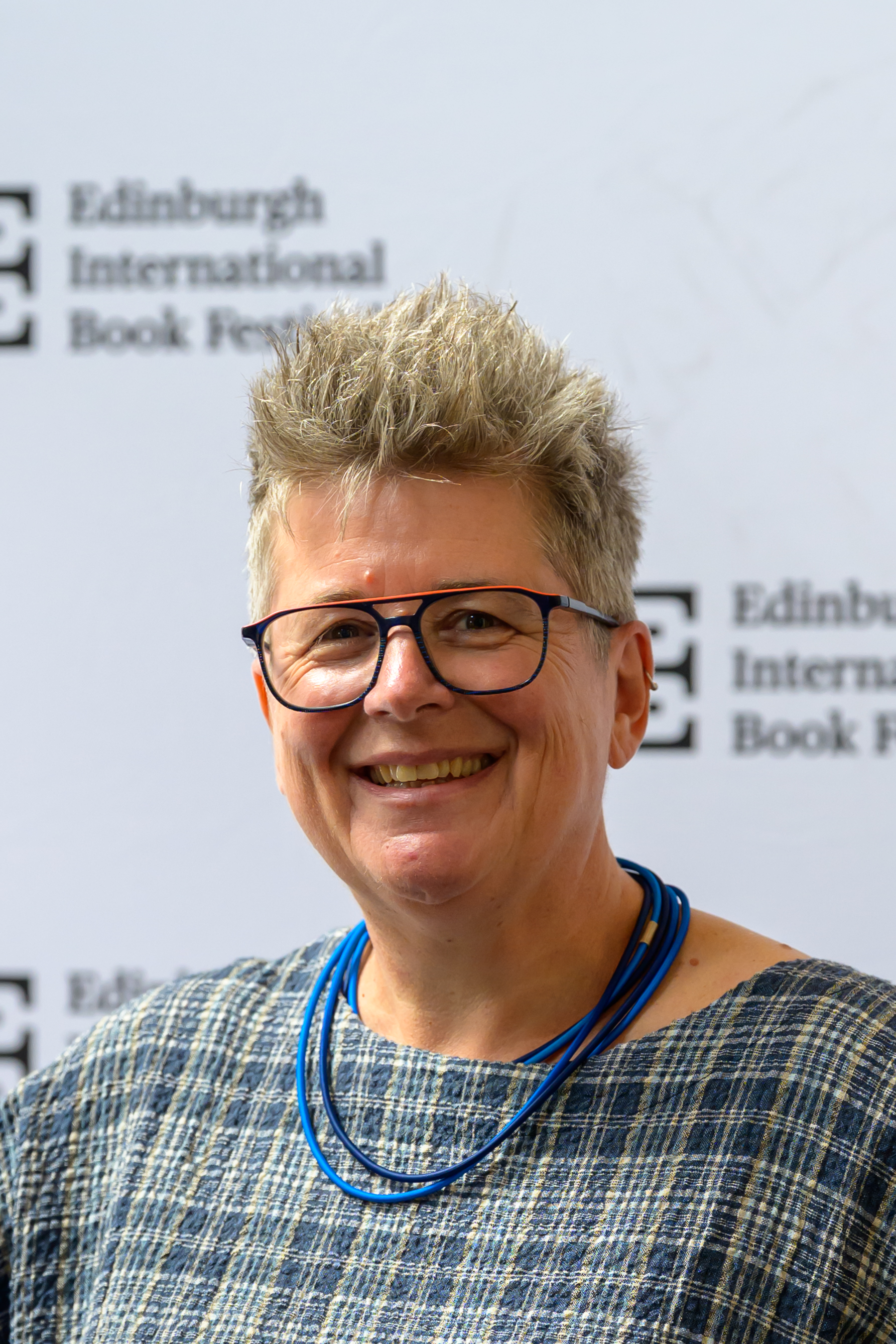
- Sharp at the Edinburgh International Book Festival in 2026
- Born: 17 November 1969 (age 57); Perth, Scotland, U.K.
- Title: Geographer Royal for Scotland
- Spouse: Val McDermid (m. 2016)
- Honours: Honorary Fellowship of the Royal Scottish Geographical Society; President's Medal of the Royal Scottish Geographical Society; Busk Medal of the Royal Geographical Society; Fellow of the Royal Society of Edinburgh
- Website: https://www.st-andrews.ac.uk/geography-sustainable-development/people/js314/

Professor Joanne Patricia Sharp (born 17 November 1969) is a Scottish geographer. She researches and writes on geopolitics and feminist geography. In April 2022, she became Geographer Royal for Scotland, the first woman to hold the title which was created in 1682. She is a Fellow of the Royal Society of Edinburgh and has been awarded the President's Medal of the Royal Scottish Geographical Society.

== Biography ==
=== Academic background ===
Sharp's dissertation was published in 2000 under the title Condensing the Cold War: Reader's Digest and American Identity. She was a professor at the University of Glasgow from 1995 to 2019, and later a professor at the University of St Andrews School of Geography and Sustainable Development.

== Research ==
=== Geopolitics and critical political geography ===
Sharp's dissertation (2000), focused on the American magazine Reader's Digest and how it contributed to the creation of a certain "American identity" between 1922 and 2000. According to her, Reader's Digest consolidated its image of America in opposition to the Soviet Union and communism.

=== Feminist geography ===
Sharp has published significant research on feminist geography, notably with co-author Linda McDowell.

=== Postcolononial geography ===
According to Heidi Bojsen:

"Joanne Sharp reminds us that colonial cartography, that of conquered territories, first served colonizers to control and occupy colonized countries and, second, as a concept that allowed the colonized to imagine themselves as 'nations' and thus to claim their independence."

== Personal life ==
Sharp was born and raised in Perth, Scotland and attended Perth Academy. She credits her love of geography to her “inspirational” teacher, Kenneth Maclean.

Sharp has been married to the Scottish crime writer Val McDermid since October 2016.

== Awards and recognition ==
Sharp became Geographer Royal for Scotland in April 2022. This distinction was created in 1682 and the first geographer to hold this title was Robert Sibbald. It was reintroduced in 2015, having not been awarded for nearly a century. Sharp is the first woman to hold this title. Her position as Geographer Royal for Scotland is scheduled to last for six years, from 2022 to 2028.

Sharp has also received the following medals, distinctions, and awards:

- 2009: Honorary Fellowship of the Royal Scottish Geographical Society
- 2010: President's Medal of the Royal Scottish Geographical Society, which recognises the achievement of geographers and the impact of their work on society
- 2016: Busk Medal of the Royal Geographical Society
- 2017: Fellow of the Royal Society of Edinburgh

== Principal publications ==
=== Works ===
- Linda McDowell and Joanne Sharp, Space, Gender, Knowledge: Feminist Readings. London, Routledge, 1997, 483 p. (ISBN 978-1-315-82487-1, doi:10.4324/9781315824871)
- Linda McDowell and Joanne Sharp, A Feminist Glossary of Human Geography, London, Routledge, 1999, 382 p. (ISBN 978-1-315-83244-9, doi:10.4324/9781315832449)
- Joanne Sharp, Paul Routledge, Chris Philo and Ronan Paddison, Entanglements of Power. London, Routledge, 1999, 320 p. (ISBN 978-0-415-18434-2, 978-0-415-18435-9, OCLC 156864646, doi:10.4324/9780203011270)
- Joanne P. Sharp, 2000, Condensing the Cold War: Reader's Digest and American Identity, NED-New edition, University of Minnesota Press, 2000 (ISBN 978-0-8166-3415-6, doi:10.5749/j.ctttsx1j)
- Joanne P. Sharp, 2008, Geographies of Postcolonialism. London: Sage. ISBN 978-1-5264-9882-3
- Val McDermid & Jo Sharp, 2026, This Door of the Seas. Edinburgh, Polygon, ISBN 978-1-84697-746-6

=== Articles and chapters ===
- Joanne P. Sharp, “Publishing American identity: popular geopolitics, myth and The Reader's Digest”, Political Geography, vol. 12, no 6, November 1, 1993, p. 491–503 (ISSN 0962-6298, doi:10.1016/0962-6298(93)90001-N, read online [archive], accessed August 19, 2022)
- Joanne P. Sharp, “Gendering Nationhood: A feminist engagement with national identity”, in Nancy Duncan, BodySpace: Destabilizing Geographies of Gender and Sexuality, London, Routledge, 1996, 288 p. (ISBN 978-0-203-97407-0, doi:10.4324/9780203974070-15/gendering-nationhood, read online [archive]), pp. 97–107
- Lorraine Dowler and Joanne Sharp, “A Feminist Geopolitics?”, Space and Polity, vol. 5, no. 3, 1 December 2001, pp. 165–176 (ISSN 1356-2576, doi:10.1080/13562570120104382, read online [archive], accessed 19 August 2022)
- John Briggs and Joanne Sharp, “Indigenous knowledges and development: a postcolonial caution”, Third World Quarterly, vol. 25, no. 4, 1 May 2004, pp. 661–676 (ISSN 0143-6597, doi:10.1080/01436590410001678915, read online [archive], accessed 19 August 2022)
- Joanne Sharp, Venda Pollock and Ronan Paddison, “Just Art for a Just City: Public Art and Social Inclusion in Urban Regeneration”, Urban Studies, vol. 42, nos. 5–6, May 2005, pp. 1001–1023 (ISSN 0042-0980 and 1360-063X, doi:10.1080/00420980500106963, read online [archive], accessed 19 August 2022)
