= A Darker Domain =

2008 psychological thriller novel by Val McDermid

- First edition
- Author: Val McDermid
- Language: English
- Subject: UK miners' strike of 1984–1985
- Genre: Crime novel, psychological thriller
- Publisher: HarperCollins
- Publication date: 2008
- Publication place: United Kingdom

A Darker Domain is a 2008 psychological thriller novel by Scottish crime writer Val McDermid. Reviewers often noted the fast paced style of the novel as it flashes back and forth between two plot lines, a contemporary crime in 2007 and the investigation of a cold case from 1984. The novel is set during the UK miners' strike of 1984–1985 in Fife. Her accounts of the strike are particularly pointed, exploring the effects of the strikes on the emotions of the people involved and their community. McDermid was raised in Fife, and one reviewer credits her accurate review of the strikes to her experiences earlier in her life. The reviews of the book were generally good, many of the reviewers comparing the book to her previous novels. The New York Times named the book one of the "Notable Crime Books of 2009."

== Synopsis ==
During the infamous UK miners' strike of 1984–1985, a wealthy young heiress and her infant son are kidnapped in Fife, before a botched payoff leaves her dead and the child missing. Twenty-two years later, DI Karen Pirie, an expert on cold cases, interviews a journalist who may have found a clue to the enigma while on vacation in Tuscany. However, she soon becomes preoccupied with another missing persons case from about the same time. Fellow mine workers and even his own wife believed that Mick Prentice notoriously broke ranks and left to join a group of 'scab' strike breakers far south in Nottingham, but recent evidence suggests that his disappearance might not have been as simple as that. Moreover, Mick's grown daughter Misha desperately needs to find her estranged father for critical reasons of her own. DI Pirie soon finds herself stumbling through a darker domain of violence, greed, secrets and betrayal.

The novel jumps back and forth between the time of the key events of both cases during the miners' strike and the current day. The flashbacks provide scattered, nonsequential background for the facts in the order that Pirie and present-day others discover them or relate them. This structure allows the author to present intricate plotlines and reveal facts in a manner that sustains the suspense. Because the plot is convoluted, however, and McDermid didn't offer the readers graphics to help them orient themselves in the local landscape, readers may want to glance at maps of the Fife area and Tuscan countryside where the plot locations are noted.

== Themes ==
The UK miners' strike and the disintegration of community that followed because of the suffering the miners and their families had to endure are central to the plot. Particularly pointed are the depictions of neighbours turning against each other and families having to wait in long lines for food because of the poverty caused by the year-long strike. Instead of just examining the effects upon the communities, however, McDermid also explores the characters' emotions during the two periods examined. One reviewer pointed to McDermid's childhood in Fife as the reason she was so good at depicting the effects of the strike.

== Style ==
Like McDermid's other mystery novels, A Darker Domain is fast paced. The flashbacks between the time of the disappearances in 1984 and 1985 and the current investigation by DI Pirie help keep the novel moving. One reviewer felt that the fast paced flashbacks sometimes made the plot confusing, saying that it is a complicated, and sometimes convoluted, plot. The New York Times noted that the author's parallel plots created too much "weight" for the story to stand on its own.

McDermid's word choice allows her to build tension throughout the narrative, never making coincidence unbelievable in propelling the plot along. McDermid uses "gallows humour" throughout the book to keep readers entertained, despite the gruesome scenes that she often describes. The New York Times calls her style "a gruff eloquence."

== Critical reception ==
Anne Marie Scanlon in the Irish newspaper The Independent called the novel " an outstanding return to form for Val McDermid, one that far surpasses expectations" noting that McDermid's previous successes had kept expectations for her future work high for her following. Similarly the British newspaper The Times, called A Darker Domain "[a]n absorbing novel, one of her best." Brandon Robshaw of British newspaper The Independent called the book "cleverly told" and "smoothly readable," adding that the only drawback was that McDermid "likes her heroine a bit too much ... [d]umpy and unglamorous on the outside, but sexy and with a razor-sharp mind." Fordyce Maxwell of the Scotsman proclaimed the book a great read despite its end, which ties together all the loose ends too neatly.

Kim Sweetman of The Courier Mail was less enthusiastic, observing that "compared with some of the other work of this master writer, it can be a little slow and convoluted" though it was still a good crime novel. Marilyn Stasio of The New York Times had a similar problem with A Darker Domain, remarking that although McDermid is talented, the multiple plot lines were simply too much.

== TV Adaptation ==
In February 2023, ITV announced that a second series of the Karen Pirie adaptation had been commissioned, and would be based on A Darker Domain.
