= Ari Stidham =

American actor (born 1992)

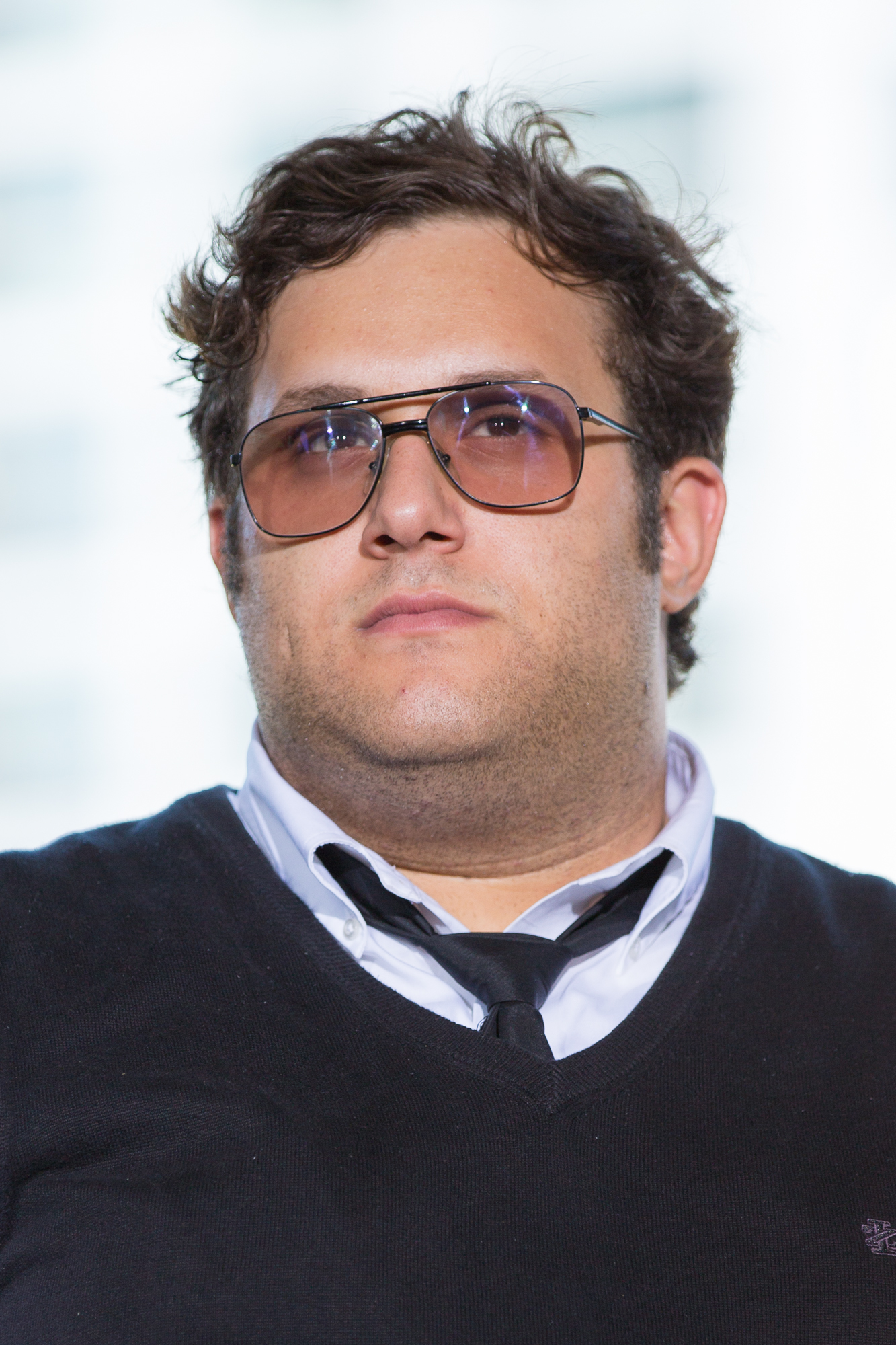
- Stidham at San Diego Comic-Con in 2016
- Born: August 22, 1992 (age 34)
- Occupation: Actor
- Years active: 2010–present

Ari Stidham (born August 22, 1992) is an American actor. He is known for his role of statistical genius Sylvester Dodd in the CBS drama series Scorpion.

== Early life ==
Stidham was born on August 22, 1992, to a Sephardic Jewish father and an Ashkenazi Jewish mother, and grew up in Westlake Village, California. His maternal grandparents were from Russia, and his paternal grandparents were from Morocco and the United States. He was raised in an observant Reform Jewish home, and he attended the Center for Early Jewish Education in Thousand Oaks. He does not identify as religiously Jewish, but he identifies as culturally Jewish.

Stidham began playing music at four and performed in theater and musical productions throughout elementary and high school. He later performed with and was a member of ComedySportz Los Angeles Improvisational comedy group.

== Career ==
Stidham broke into acting in 2010, with the character Ian in ABC Family television series Huge, based on a novel of the same name which centered around eight teenagers who had been sent to a weight loss camp. He later auditioned for the part of Sylvester Dodd in the CBS series Scorpion, despite the role being written for an African-American actor in his thirties, and was cast in the role after a single audition. From 2014 to 2018, Stidham was a part of the main cast for the all four seasons of the series (93 episodes).

He also releases music under the name DrTelevision, or DRTV. Additionally, through his production company Stidley Inc., he produces "short form alternative comedy" with Zach Green, including a monthly love comedy radio play Dick Duquesne: Tales of a Private Dick.

Stidham founded his company, Sanguinet Films in 2016 with Ari at the helm as a producer, writer, and director of the company. He directed their flagship feature, Curse of the Siren, which premiered at Fangoria Fearcon in 2016.

In 2018, he played archvillain Grand Moff Levine in a musical stage spoof titled Solo Must Die: A Musical Parody. In October 2019, Stidham presented a comedy and musical celebration and re-telling of the Edgar Allan Poe's works titled The Edgar Allan Show. Re-enactments and recitals of "The Raven", "The Tell-Tale Heart" and "The Fall of the House of Usher", were directed by and featured original songs by Stidham.

In 2023, alongside Bradley Gosnell, he adapted The Great Gatsby into a play with music entitled "The Great Gatsby Live" with period-specific songs arranged by Andrew Fox, composer of Slam Frank. It was performed as a part of 5 Star Theatricals' Educational Program, and had a run in 2026 in Thousand Oaks, California.

Stidham founded Radio Rogues with Beverlee Jean and Bradley Gosnell in 2025, producing bar Shakespeare as Radio Plays with live jazz music. Stidham adapts the text and music, and directs the program. Performances were held at the Roguelike Tavern in Burbank, California.

In 2026, Stidham was cast as Dean Lassider in the series Reacher for Amazon Prime Video. He is recurring in the fifth season of the series, based on the book Make Me. This performance reunites him for a third time with frequent collaborator Nick Santora, who previously worked with Stidham on Scorpion for CBS and The Fugitive.

== Filmography ==
=== Film ===
| Year | Title | Role |
|---|---|---|
| 2009 | Jack's Box | Ari |
| 2010 | Election Day | Ari |
| 2010 | The Green Family Elbow | Bully |
| 2011 | Anyplace | Luke |
| 2011 | Talon's Rant | |
| 2012 | Kidnap Party | Officer |
| 2016 | The Meme | Max Bloom |
| 2023 | Foil | Felix The Manager |

=== Television ===
| Year | Title | Role | Notes |
|---|---|---|---|
| 2010 | Huge | Ian Schonfeld | Main cast; 10 episodes |
| 2010 | The Whole Truth | Erik | Episode: "True Confessions" |
| 2011 | Glee | Drunk Kid | Episode: "Blame It on the Alcohol" |
| 2013 | Mike and Molly | Henry | Episode: "Molly's New Shoes" |
| 2013 | The Crazy Ones | Ari / Member of the Crowd | 2 episodes |
| 2014–2018 | Scorpion | Sylvester Dodd | Main cast; 93 episodes |
| 2015 | Con Man | 1st class fan | 3 episodes |
| 2016 | The Price Is Right | Sylvester Dodd | Crossover with Scorpion; Episode: "The Fast and the Nerdiest" |
| 2016 | Insecure | Cameron | 2 episodes |
| 2016 | Obituary: A Grave Beginning | Lester Catfield / Coach McKinney (voice) | TV short |
| 2017 | Growth: VR | Jack Filo | Episode: "Hot yoga" |
| 2020 | The Fugitive | Head shop owner | Episode: "Hunted Becomes the Hunter" |
| 2020 | The Martian Broadcast | Orson Welles (voice) | Episode: "Something for Children" |
| 2021 | 5150 | Radio show host (voice) | TV short |
| TBA | Reacher | Dean Lassider | TBA |
