= Walker Scobell =

American actor (born 2009)

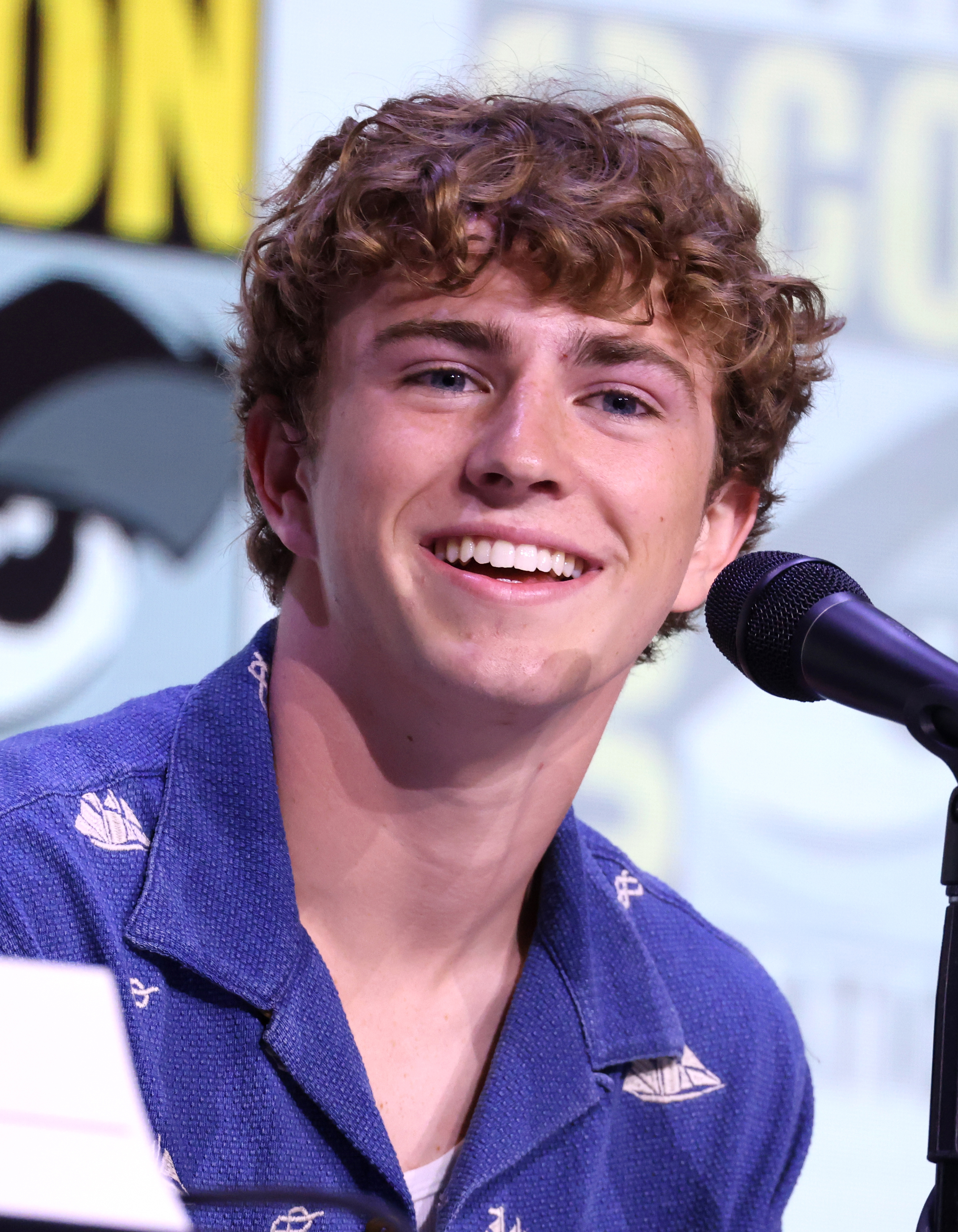
- Scobell at the 2025 San Diego Comic-Con
- Born: January 5, 2009 (age 17); Virginia Beach, Virginia, U.S.
- Occupation: Actor
- Years active: 2020–present
- Father: Pete Scobell

Walker Scobell (/ˌskoʊˈbɛl/ sko-BEL; born January 5, 2009) is an American actor. Born in Virginia, he made his professional acting debut at age 13 and gained immediate recognition for his lead roles in the science fiction streaming films The Adam Project and Secret Headquarters (both 2022). Scobell received continued recognition with his leading titular role in the Disney+ fantasy series Percy Jackson and the Olympians (2023–present).

== Early life ==
Scobell was born on January 5, 2009, in Virginia Beach, Virginia, to Heather Scobell and Pete Scobell in a military family. He has an older sister and younger brother. Scobell lived in Colorado until the family moved to Pennsylvania, where his parents grew up. In elementary school, he attended drama class. In middle school, he acted in the school's production of Mary Poppins. Shortly after, he attended a John D'Aquino acting workshop, hired a manager and signed to an agency.

== Career ==
=== Beginnings (2021–2022) ===
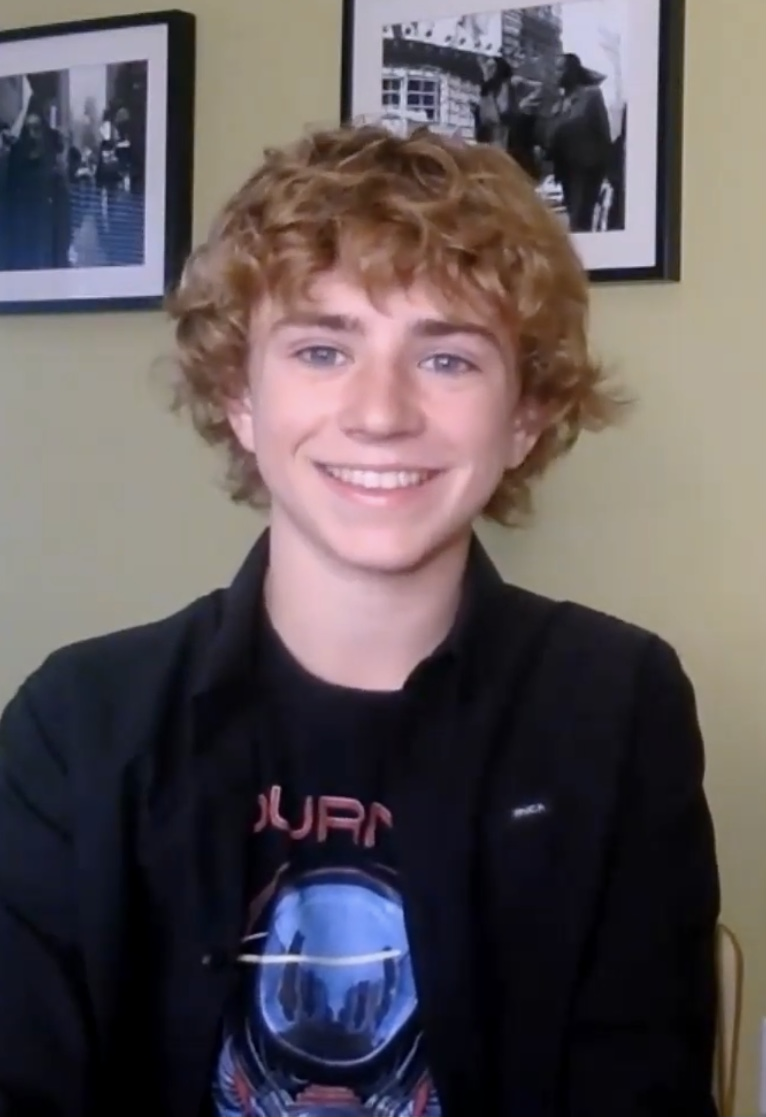
Scobell in 2022

Scobell auditioned in August 2020 to play the younger version of Ryan Reynolds' character in the Netflix film The Adam Project. His impersonation of Reynolds earned him his first acting role despite the hundreds of children who auditioned for the part. Scobell told interviewers that watching Reynolds' Deadpool film many times growing up contributed to his ability to mimic Reynolds. Filming began in Vancouver in November 2020 and it was released in March 2022. Scobell received praise for his performance. Joey Arthur of The Wichitan wrote, "Scobell and Reynolds’ interaction on screen is perfect and amazing to witness as Scobell portrays a perfect younger version of Reynolds and Reynolds portrays a perfect older version of Scobell." Glen Weldon of NPR praised him for being "legitimately funny [and] bracingly unprecocious."

Scobell starred alongside Owen Wilson in Secret Headquarters. The film was released on Paramount+ in August 2022.

=== Rising popularity (2023–present) ===
A few months before the release of The Adam Project, Scobell auditioned for the role of Percy Jackson in the Disney+ series Percy Jackson and the Olympians. Series author Rick Riordan said that Scobell "blew us away with his audition tapes for the role of Percy." The casting was publicly announced a few months later, in April 2022. The series premiered on December 20, 2023 and was renewed for a second and third season. Scobell's performance was widely praised by critics, with Aramide Tinubu of Variety praising him for playing Percy with "a snark and cynicism that perfectly encapsulates the experiences of a defiant boy."

In May 2023, Scobell joined the cast of Looking Through Water, a family drama directed by Roberto Sneider. In April 2025, he joined the cast of The Angry Birds Movie 3, which is scheduled to be released on December 23, 2026.

== Personal life ==
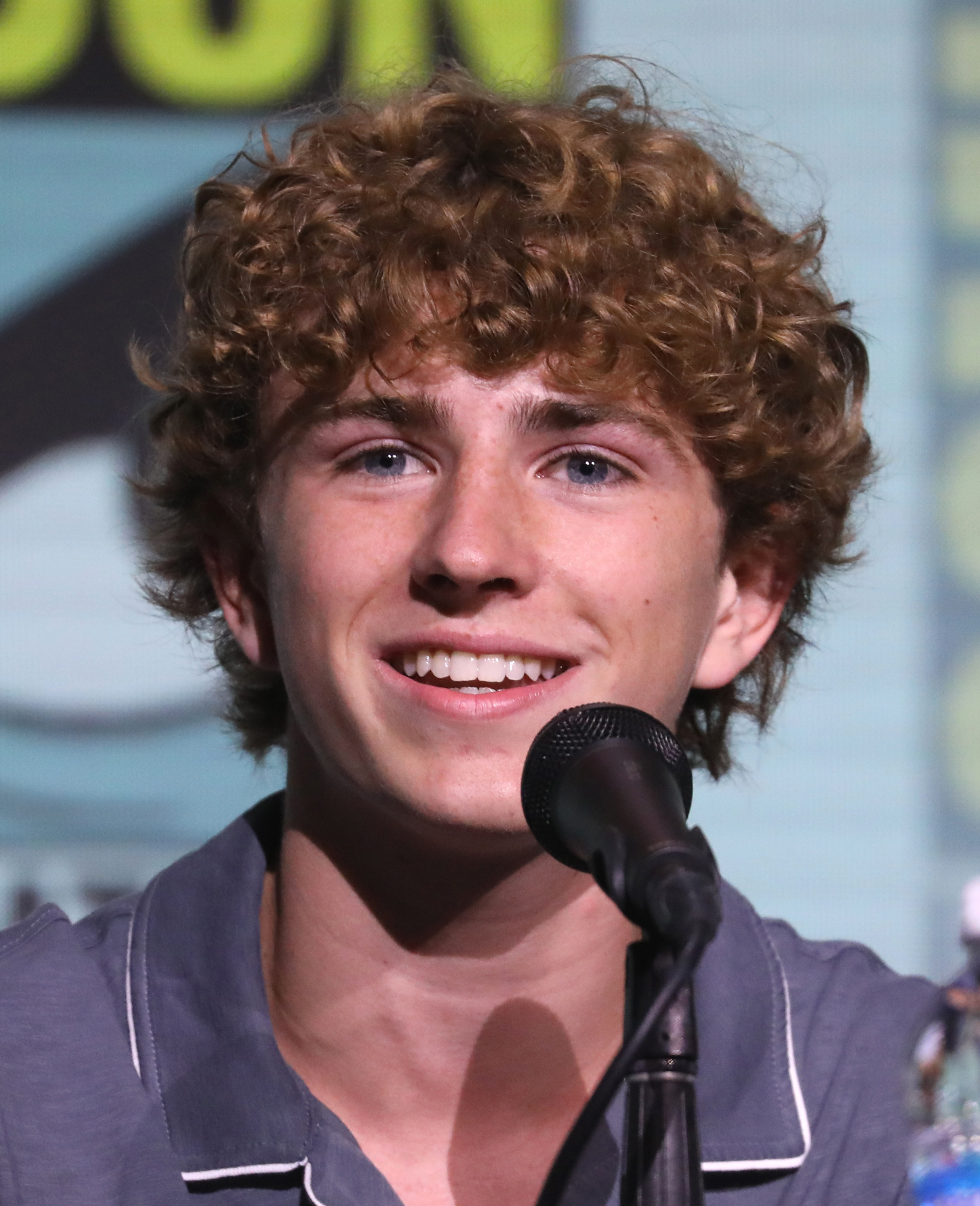
Scobell speaking at the 2024 San Diego Comic-Con in San Diego, California.

Scobell attends Fairview High School when not traveling or on set. In April 2026, Scobell stated that he wouldn't attend prom after death threats were sent to "every teenage girl who could remotely be associated with me".

== Filmography ==
=== Film ===
Year	Title	Role	Notes	Ref.
2022	The Adam Project	Adam Reed (young)		
2022	Secret Headquarters	Charlie Kincaid		
2025	Looking Through Water	Kyle		
2026	The Angry Birds Movie 3	Glider	Voice; post-production	

=== Television ===
Year	Title	Role	Notes	Ref.
2023–present	Percy Jackson and the Olympians	Percy Jackson	Main role	
2025	Cartoonified with Phineas and Ferb	Himself	Voice role; Episode: "Phineas and Ferb Ride a Crazy River with Walker Scobell"	

== Awards and nominations ==
Year	Award	Category	Work	Result	Ref.
2022	MTV Movie & TV Awards	Best Team	The Adam Project	Nominated (Note: Shared with Ryan Reynolds)	
2024	Kids' Choice Awards	Favorite Male TV Star (Kids)	Percy Jackson and the Olympians	Won	
2025	SCAD TVfest	Rising Star Award	Percy Jackson and the Olympians	Won	
