= Food Network Star Kids =

American television series

- Genre: Food reality television
- Judges: Tia Mowry; Donal Skehan
- Country of origin: United States
- Original language: English
- No. of seasons: 1
- No. of episodes: 6

Production
- Running time: 41:00
- Production company: Triage Entertainment

Original release
- Network: Food Network
- Release: August 22 – September 26, 2016

Related
- Food Network Star

Food Network Star Kids is an American cooking competition television series that aired on Food Network, presented by actress Tia Mowry and food critic Donal Skehan. The series is a spin-off of Food Network Star.

== Contestants ==
=== Winner ===
- Amber Kelley – Seattle, Washington

=== Runners-up ===
- Isaiah Hooks – Stroudsburg, Pennsylvania
- Liam Waldman – Los Angeles, California

=== Eliminated ===
(in order of elimination)

- Nicholas Hornbostel – Vail, Colorado
- Sydnie Jaye Meyers – Austin, Texas
- Gracie Evans – Tampa, Florida
- Sammy Voit – The Bronx, New York
- Salvatore "Sal" Soldo – Staten Island, New York
- Tyra Jefferson – Irmo, South Carolina
- Alexa "Lexi" Shuster – Port Chester, New York

== Contestant progress ==
Finalist	1	2	3	4	5	6
Amber	IN	LOW	HIGH	HIGH	IN	WINNER
Isaiah	HIGH	IN	WIN	IN	IN	RUNNER-UP
Liam	HIGH	HIGH	LOW	HIGH	IN	RUNNER-UP
Lexi	LOW	IN	IN	LOW	OUT	
Tyra	IN	WIN	IN	OUT		
Sal	LOW	LOW	OUT			
Sammy	WIN	OUT				
Gracie	OUT					
Sydnie	OUT					
Nicholas	OUT					

(WINNER) The contestant won Food Network Star Kids.
(RUNNER-UP) The contestant made it to the finale, but did not win.
(WIN) The contestant won the challenge for that week.
(HIGH) The contestant was one of the judges' favorites in the challenge for that week.
(IN) The contestant performed sufficiently well to advance to the next week.
(LOW) The contestant was one of the judges' least favorites for that week, but advanced.
(OUT) The contestant was eliminated from the competition.
