= Something in the Water (2024 film) =

2024 British survival thriller film

- Directed by: Hayley Easton Street
- Written by: Cat Clarke
- Produced by: Julie Baines
- Starring: Hiftu Quasem; Natalie Mitson; Nicole Rieko Setsuko; Lauren Lyle; Ellouise Shakespeare-Hart
- Cinematography: Niels Reedtz Johansen
- Edited by: Pani Scott
- Music by: Nainita Desai; Harry Peat
- Production company: Dan Films
- Distributed by: StudioCanal UK
- Release date: 21 June 2024
- Running time: 86 minutes
- Country: United Kingdom
- Language: English
- Box office: $1.4 million

Something in the Water is a 2024 British survival thriller film directed by Hayley Easton Street and written by Cat Clarke. Its plot follows a group of friends who meet up for a wedding in the Caribbean, and become stranded in the sea after their hire boat sinks.

== Plot ==
On their way home from a date, Meg and Kayla, a young couple, are accosted by a group of thugs who insult them with homophobic slurs. When Kayla retaliates by throwing double middle fingers, they brutally attack Meg and kick her unconscious.

One year later, Meg travels to the West Indies where she meets up with friends Lizzie, Cam and Ruth, to celebrate Lizzie's wedding to Dominic, Cam's brother. The atmosphere is made awkward due to Kayla, who Meg hasn't seen since the attack that left her in a critical condition, also being present.

The day before the wedding, Cam hires a boat to drive to a secluded island several miles away from their resort. Upon arriving at the island, Cam, Lizzie and Ruth drop Meg and Kayla off on a beach to talk through their problems while they drive to another area of the island.

After a short while, Meg and Kayla track down their three friends and pretend to have reconciled. While swimming in the sea, Ruth is bitten on the leg by a shark. As she is bleeding profusely, the others decide to get her on the boat and head back to the resort. However, the hire boat, which is old and in poor shape, springs a leak and sinks after accidentally hitting reefs, leaving the group stranded in the middle of the sea, miles from land. After using the one life jacket they have to support Ruth, Lizzie reveals she is unable to swim, and clings to a buoy for support. A large shark soon starts to circle, attracted by Ruth's blood.

Ruth bleeds to death, and the group reluctantly remove the life jacket from her and allow her to be taken by the shark. Kayla decides to swim for help. After she leaves, Lizzie and Cam reveal to Meg that, on the night they were attacked, Kayla was intending to propose to her. Cam is attacked and eaten by the shark.

As Lizzie and Meg cling to the buoy, a large yacht later passes them at speed but doesn't spot them in the water. Night falls as Lizzie and Meg grow tired and hungry, accidentally losing the buoy as a storm appears overhead. They confide in each other, with Meg articulating the trauma she has suffered since the attack. Meg falls asleep only to wake up in the morning finding herself alone, with the life jacket on, revealing that Lizzie has sacrificed herself to give Meg a better chance.

Now alone and facing multiple sharks, Meg finds a small rock protrusion which she rests on. As the tide submerges the rock, the sharks start to circle her, attracted by a cut on her leg and hand. Kayla arrives in a rescue boat, just in time to save Meg from the sharks. The two women decide to go home together, now experiencing a shared trauma, breaking the news to Dominic that Lizzie is dead.

== Cast ==
- Hiftu Quasem as Meg
- Natalie Mitson as Kayla
- Nicole Rieko Setsuko as Cam
- Lauren Lyle as Lizzie
- Ellouise Shakespeare-Hart as Ruth
- Gabriel Prevost-Takahashi as Dominic

== Production ==
Filming took place in The Dominican Republic and London, UK.

== Reception ==
As of June 2024 the film holds a 42% rating on Rotten Tomatoes.

The film received mixed reviews upon its release. In a four-star review, Catherine Bray of The Guardian noted that "audiences hoping for lashings of graphic violence may be disappointed" but that there is "larky tension between likeable characters who find themselves plunged into a nightmare scenario."

Donald Clarke of The Irish Times gave the film a negative review, noting that "the characterisation is so thin and the dialogue so clunky that the thing plays more like one of those 1960s surf horrors [...] that invited drive-in audiences to speculate about which beach denizen deserved to get eaten first."
