= Looking Through Water =

2025 film by Roberto Sneider

- Theatrical release poster
- Directed by: Roberto Sneider
- Screenplay by: Zach Dean; Rowdy Herrington
- Based on: Catching Big Fish and Looking Through Water by Bob Rich
- Produced by: Eric Scott Woods; Carla Woods; Robert Mitas; Stan Spry
- Starring: Michael Stahl-David; David Morse; Cameron Douglas; Walker Scobell; Michael Douglas
- Cinematography: Serguei Saldívar
- Edited by: Yang-Hua Hu
- Music by: Jeff Russo
- Production company: AETH Entertainment
- Distributed by: Good Deed Entertainment
- Release date: September 12, 2025
- Running time: 107 minutes
- Country: United States
- Language: English

Looking Through Water is a 2025 American drama film directed by Roberto Sneider, written by Zach Dean and Rowdy Herrington, and starring Michael Stahl-David, David Morse, Cameron Douglas, Walker Scobell, and Michael Douglas. It is based on Bob Rich's 2015 novel Looking Through Water and his 2025 memoir Catching Big Fish.

== Premise ==
In an attempt to mend their broken relationship, a man invites his estranged son to compete in a father–son fishing competition in San Pedro, Belize.

== Cast ==
- Michael Douglas as William McKay
  - Michael Stahl-David as Young William
- Cameron Douglas as Cole McKay
- David Morse as Leo McKay
- Walker Scobell as Kyle
- Ximena Romo as Julia
- Tamara Tunie as Estel Reno
- Liza Weil as Sarah McKay

== Production ==
In November 2022, it was announced that Michael Douglas and Cameron Douglas would star in the film Blood Knot, with Howard Deutch serving as director.

In May 2023, it was announced that Roberto Sneider replaced Deutch due to schedule conflicts and that David Morse, Michael Stahl-David and Walker Scobell had been added to the cast.

Filming occurred in Pittsfield, Massachusetts in June 2023. In July 2023, it was reported that filming in Massachusetts was completed and that the rest of the film will be shot in Belize and Mexico City.

== Release ==
In June 2025, Good Deed Entertainment acquired the film rights of the film, which had been retitled from Blood Knot to Looking Through Water. The film was released in the United States on September 12, 2025.

== Reception ==
Nell Minow of RogerEbert.com awarded the film two and a half stars out of four.

Luna Guthrie of Collider rated the film a 6 out of 10.
