= Foil (film) =

2023 American film by Zach Green

- Directed by: Zach Green
- Screenplay by: Zach Green; Devin O'Rourke
- Produced by: Jill V. Dae
- Starring: Zach Green; Devin O'Rourke; Chris Doubek; Brian McGuire; Ashley Spillers; Ari Stidham; Jasmine Wattar
- Cinematography: Jordan Black
- Edited by: Devin O'Rourke
- Music by: Jake Weston
- Production company: Birdshot Pictures
- Distributed by: Cranked Up Films
- Release dates: June 30, 2023 (Dances With Films); May 10, 2024
- Running time: 100 minutes
- Country: United states
- Language: English

Foil is a 2023 buddy sci-fi comedy feature film directed by Zach Green. The screenplay was written by Zach Green and Devin O'Rourke and centers around an unusual piece of foil with potential alien origin that causes a rift between two former best friends camping in the California desert.

== Production ==
Foil was filmed primarily in Lancaster, CA with additional scenes filmed in Joshua Tree and Los Angeles. Production began in September 2021 and wrapped in March 2022.

== Release ==
Foil premiered at Dances With Films Festival in Los Angeles, CA on June 30, 2023 and was released on VOD by Cranked Up Films, a genre subdivision of Good Deed Entertainment, on May 10, 2024.

== Reception ==
Shelag Rowan-Legg of Screen Anarchy gave the film 3 out of 5 stars, writing, "Foil is rough around its edges, but it has a good heart and a healthy dose of good-natured self-reflection, with a clever spin on alien conspiracy theories, and how friendships can get lost and found again in those awkward post-high school years."

Brian Fanelli of HorrorBuzz gave the film a 7.5 out of 10 rating, writing, "The narrative certainly veers into some weird places, but it never really strays from its more light-hearted tone and it’s a heck of a lot of fun."

In a video review, Jackie K. Cooper rated it 4/10, saying "it's an interesting premise and Zach Green and Devin O'Rourke play the parts well," adding, "it's kind of a quirky story so some people might find more interest in it than I did."

Phil Walsh of Geek Vibes Nation gave it a 5.5 rating, writing "Foil has a certain silly charm, and when it sticks the landing, it is pretty enjoyable. However, the pacing is in another galaxy, and at some point, the story dithers."

Josh Bell of Crooked Marquee gave it a C rating, writing, "Foil aims for Clerks with aliens and ends up closer to Yoga Hosers, dragging out its comedy-sketch premise for more than 100 minutes."
