= To Dust =

2018 film by Shawn Snyder

- Theatrical release poster
- Directed by: Shawn Snyder
- Written by: Jason Begue; Shawn Snyder
- Produced by: Emily Mortimer; Alessandro Nivola; Josh Crook; Ron Perlman; Scott Lochmus
- Starring: Géza Röhrig; Matthew Broderick
- Cinematography: Xavi Giménez
- Edited by: Allyson C. Johnson
- Music by: Ariel Marx
- Production companies: Wing and a Prayer Pictures; King Bee Productions; Storyland Pictures; Big Jack Productions; Cool Productions; Bron Life; Salem Street Entertainment; UnLtd Productions
- Distributed by: Good Deed Entertainment
- Release dates: April 22, 2018 (Tribeca); February 8, 2019 (United States)
- Running time: 92 minutes
- Country: United States
- Language: English
- Box office: $184,495

To Dust is a 2018 American comedy-drama film directed by Shawn Snyder (in his feature directorial debut), who co-wrote the screenplay with Jason Begue. It stars Géza Röhrig and Matthew Broderick, with Janet Sarno, Ben Hammer, Leo Heller, Sammy Voit, and Marceline Hugot in supporting roles. It follows a Hasidic cantor who, distraught by the untimely death of his wife, struggles to find religious solace.

The film had its world premiere at the 17th Tribeca Film Festival on April 22, 2018, where it won the Narrative Audience Award and Best New Narrative Director (for Snyder). It was given a limited theatrical release in the United States on February 8, 2019, by Good Deed Entertainment. It received positive reviews from critics, and was nominated for Best Screenplay (for Begue and Snyder) at the 35th Independent Spirit Awards.

== Plot ==
American Hasidic Jew, Shmuel, loses his beloved wife, Rivka, to cancer. Now he lives with his mother, two sons, and a terrible longing. While his mother advises Shmuel to "move on" and marry again, the children think that a dibbuk, the spirit of Rivka, has moved into their father. Longing and excitement drive Shmuel to look for answers to unexpected questions. What worries him most is the thought of what happens to his beloved wife's body after burial and how quickly she turns to dust. To find answers and religious solace, Shmuel initially approaches a rabbi, but then forms an unlikely partnership with a professor of biology.

== Cast ==
- Géza Röhrig as Shmuel
- Matthew Broderick as Albert
- Leo Heller as Noam
- Sammy Voit as Naftali
- Janet Sarno as Faigy
- Stephanie Kurtzuba as Receptionist
- Ben Hammer as Rebbe
- Larry Owens as Stanley
- Bern Cohen as Reb Goshen
- Aaron Raksin as Sender
- Jill Marie Lawrence as Judy
- Joseph Siprut as Undertaker
- Zalman Raksin as Brother-in-Law
- Sarah Jes Austell as Receptionist Pam
- Natalie Carter as Stella the Security Guard
- Marceline Hugot as Carol
- Ziv Zaifman as Moshe
- Isabelle Phillips as Shprintzel
- Leanne Watson as Rivkah

== Production ==
In 2015, the Tisch School of the Arts' $100,000 Sloan First Feature Film Prize was awarded to graduate student Shawn Snyder to produce his screenplay, To Dust. Snyder himself called the film a dark comedy, and talked about how his Reform Judaism background informed the story:

I have an ongoing journey with my Judaism that waxes and wanes. As a spiritual seeker myself, the movie is about how to find our own personal meanings and build our own rituals around it. That lifelong and continuing journey is largely what the film is about, our right to grieve, to find meaning in that loss, and to have conversations with the cultures we come from.

To Dust was produced by Ron Perlman and Josh Crook's Wing and a Prayer Pictures, Emily Mortimer and Alessandro Nivola's King Bee Productions, and Scott Floyd Lochmus. The original music was composed by Ariel Marx.

== Release ==
To Dust had its world premiere at the Tribeca Film Festival on April 22, 2018. In June 2018, Good Deed Entertainment acquired U.S distribution rights to the film. It was then released in select theaters on February 8, 2019.

== Reception ==
=== Critical response ===
On the review aggregator website Rotten Tomatoes, 89% of 47 critics' reviews are positive, with an average rating of 7.1/10. The website's consensus reads: "Thematically ambitious and tonally audacious, To Dust tackles universally relatable topics in a bracingly original way." Metacritic, which uses a weighted average, assigned the film a score of 66 out of 100, based on 16 critics, indicating "generally favorable" reviews.

Richard Roeper of the Chicago Sun-Times commented "No doubt the material will offend some, given the nature of the storyline. And yet beneath the sometimes grisly visuals and the pitch-black humor and the general weirdness, this is the story of two men with precious little in common who become friends against all odds and help one another find a little peace in life." Classic buddy movie material. Robert Adele of the Los Angeles Times noted "The movie could use a little more energy — this is Paul Mazursky territory, after all, not Andrei Tarkovsky — but in its sick-but-sweet attempt to reclaim grief from the trappings of tradition, To Dust is its own well-measured godsend." Vulture's David Edelstein wrote that "To Dust is occasionally unintentionally cringe-inducing. The portrait of Shmuel will probably offend Orthodox Jews, despite — or perhaps because of — his continuous exclamations that everything he's doing is 'not Jewish.' The spirit of inquiry is extremely Jewish, but different communities have different levels of tolerance for going outside the lines."

Mark Dujsik of RogerEbert.com gave the film three stars out of four, and wrote: "Religion can provide some solace, but it can also complicate matters. Science can explain the natural processes, but even then, it cannot account for every detail in every situation. To Dust is about those contradictions and, in the end, about the ultimate one: that, to some questions, the only logical and spiritual answer is that there isn't one—except whatever we make of it."

=== Accolades ===
The film won the Narrative Audience Award at the 2018 Tribeca Film Festival. The film was nominated for Best Screenplay at the 35th Independent Spirit Awards.
