= Karen Pirie =

British crime drama TV series (2022 and 2025)

- Title card
- Genre: Drama
- Based on: Inspector Karen Pirie series by Val McDermid
- Written by: Emer Kenny
- Directed by: Gareth Bryn
- Starring: Lauren Lyle; Chris Jenks; Zach Wyatt
- Composer: Stephanie Taylor
- Country of origin: United Kingdom
- Original language: English
- No. of seasons: 2
- No. of episodes: 6

Production
- Executive producers: Elizabeth Binns; Simon Heath; Emer Kenny; Val McDermid
- Producer: Clare Kerr
- Production locations: St Andrews, Scotland
- Cinematography: Ryan Kernaghan
- Editor: Gareth Bryn
- Camera setup: Single-camera
- Running time: 120 minutes x 3
- Production company: World Productions

Original release
- Network: ITV
- Release: 25 September 2022 – present

Karen Pirie is a British crime drama television series based on the Inspector Karen Pirie series of novels by Val McDermid. The first series was screened on ITV in September–October 2022, and the second series in July–August 2025. ITV announced a 3rd series on October 12, 2026.

== Plot ==
In the first series, a young detective sergeant, Karen Pirie, is put in charge of a twenty-five year-old cold case, the unsolved murder of a barmaid. A popular podcast series focuses on the case and Pirie is tasked with re-examining it.

== Cast ==
- Lauren Lyle as DS/DI Karen Pirie
- Chris Jenks as DC/DS Jason "Mint" Murray
- Zach Wyatt as DS Phil Parhatka
- Emer Kenny as Dr. River Wilde
- Rakhee Thakrar as Bel Richmond
- Steve John Shepherd as DCS Simon Lees

=== Series 1 ===
- Gilly Gilchrist as DI Barney MacLennan
- Stuart Bowman as Chief Superintendent Jimmy Lawson
- Kevin Mains as Young (DI) Jimmy Lawson
- Gemma McElhinney as PC Janice Hogg
- Anna Russell-Martin as Rosie Duff
- Ariyon Bakare as Alex Gilbey
- Buom Tihngang as Young Alex Gilbey
- Michael Sheffer as Tom "Weird" Mackie
- Jack Hesketh as Young Tom 'Weird' Mackie
- Alec Newman as Ziggy Malkiewicz
- Jhon Lumsden as Young Ziggy Malkiewicz
- Bobby Rainsbury as Grace Galloway

=== Series 2 ===
- James Cosmo as Sir Broderick Grant
- Jamie Michie as Young Broderick Grant
- Frances Tomelty as Lady Mary Grant
- Madeleine Worrall as Young Mary Grant
- Julia Brown as Catriona 'Cat' Grant
- John Michie as Fergus Sinclair
- Saskia Ashdown as DC Isla Stark
- Mark Rowley as Young Mick Prentice
- Conor Berry as Young Andy Kerr
- Tom Mannion as Andy Kerr/Mathias
- Stuart Campbell as Kevin Campbell
- James Fleet as Mick Prentice aka Daniel Porteous
- Tommaso Basili as Gabriel Porteous

== Episodes ==
Series	Episodes	Originally released	
Series	Episodes	First released	Last released
1	3	25 September 2022	9 October 2022
2	3	20 July 2025	3 August 2025

=== Series 1 (2022) ===
No. overall	No. in series	Title	Directed by	Written by	Original release date
1	1	"The Distant Echo: Part 1"	Gareth Bryn	Emer Kenny	25 September 2022
2	2	"The Distant Echo: Part 2"	Gareth Bryn	Emer Kenny	2 October 2022
3	3	"The Distant Echo: Part 3"	Gareth Bryn	Emer Kenny	9 October 2022

=== Series 2 (2025) ===
No. overall	No. in series	Title	Directed by	Written by	Original release date
4	1	"A Darker Domain: Part 1"	Gareth Bryn	Emer Kenny	20 July 2025
5	2	"A Darker Domain: Part 2"	Gareth Bryn	Emer Kenny	27 July 2025 (Note: Scheduled to air at 20:00 BST on 27 July 2025 but was delayed for an hour due to UEFA Women's Euro 2025 final between England and Spain going into extra time.)
6	3	"A Darker Domain: Part 3"	Amanda Blue	Emer Kenny	3 August 2025

== Production ==
=== Series 1 ===
Series one is based on the first novel in a series by Val McDermid, The Distant Echo. Emer Kenny wrote the adaptation for television. In May 2021, it was announced that Lauren Lyle would star as the title character. The producers are the same as for the series Line of Duty and Bodyguard. Series one was directed by Gareth Bryn.

=== Series 2 ===
Series two is based on the second novel in McDermid's series, A Darker Domain, and is co-written by Emer Kenny and Gillian Roger Park. It consists of three 90-minute episodes. It was filmed in Scotland and Malta.

== Release ==
The first series began on ITV on 25 September 2022 and concluded on 9 October 2022. On 21 February 2023, it was announced the series had been commissioned for a second series. The second series started filming in early 2024, and began to be aired on 20 July 2025.

== Reception ==
=== Ratings ===
Series one averaged 4.82 million viewers.

=== Critical response ===
==== Series 1 ====
On Rotten Tomatoes, the series has an approval rating of 91% based on 11 reviews, with an average rating of 8.6/10. The site's critical consensus reads, "Clever and twisty, Karen Pirie refreshingly revamps the traditional grizzled detective procedural by putting a young woman on the case."

Writing in The Guardian, Lucy Mangan praised the show for its humour, confidence, and charm, as well as its suspenseful plot that keeps the viewer guessing until the very end. Mangan gave the show 4 out of 5 stars. Sean O'Grady also gave the show 4 out of 5 stars in The Independent, writing that the "tartan noir drama lifts itself above the usual run of these cold case thrillers because the story is told in a refreshingly cohesive way." O'Grady especially praises the work of Lyle saying that she "is excellent as the undervalued, underestimated officer who succeeds where the men have failed." Abha Shah is less enthusiastic, giving the show 3 out of 5 stars in the London Evening Standard. Shah writes: "It’s a decent enough plot but the execution is as bungled as the police work Pirie finds herself uncovering. There’s an element of finesse that’s missing, a shame considering the production team’s CV."

== Awards ==
For writing the first episode, Emer Kenny was nominated for the Edgar Allan Poe Award for Best Episode in a TV Series.

At the BAFTA Scotland Awards in November 2023, Lyle was awarded Best Actress Television for Karen Pirie and the Audience Award for Favourite Scot on Screen.

== See also ==
- Wire in the Blood, 2002 TV series, also based on characters created by Val McDermid.
