= Sammy Voit =

American actor

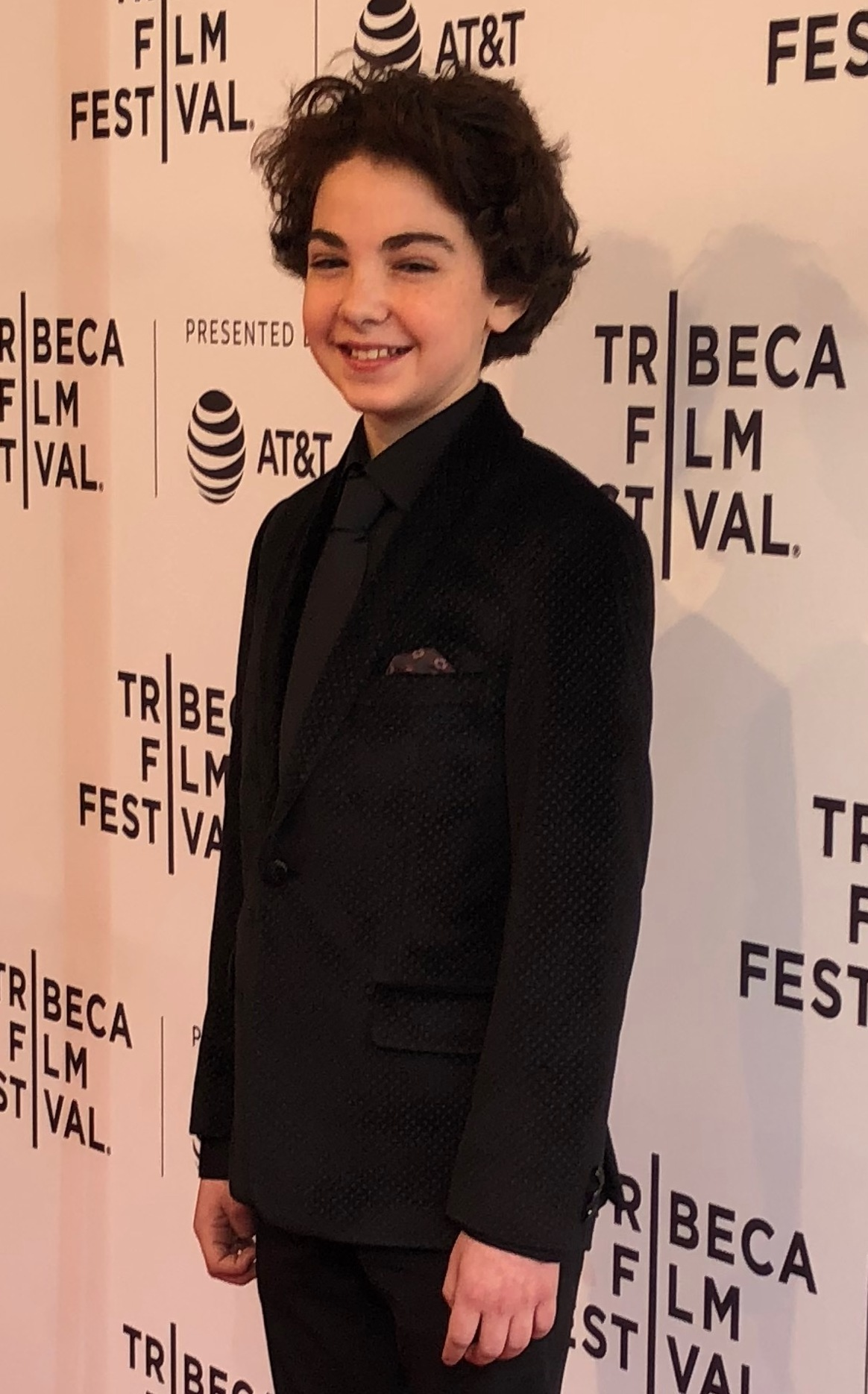
- Voit at the 2018 Tribeca Film Festival
- Born: c. 2005 or 2006 (age 19–20)
- Occupation: Actor
- Years active: 2015–present

Samuel Voit (born c. 2005/2006) is an American actor and television personality. He began his career on Masterchef Junior, Chopped Junior and Food Network Star Kids as himself. In 2018, he appeared in the film To Dust which won the Grand Jury Audience Award at the Tribeca Film Festival and was nominated in 2020 for Best Screenplay at the Independent Spirit Awards in Los Angeles. He currently stars as young Kevin Jonas in the Happiness Begins Tour and the film Happiness Continues.

== Personal life ==
Voit is from Riverdale, New York. He has an older sister and a younger brother. He is Jewish.

== Philanthropy ==
Voit is an activist for youth homelessness. He fundraises for LA and NYC-based non-profit organizations that support homeless youth. In 2017, Voit started documenting homelessness throughout NY and LA in a film called The Bus Stop. In June 2018, Voit fundraised by catering and donating his Bar Mitzvah gifts to several homeless communities.

== In the media ==
In 2018, Voit was listed by Variety in the Hollywood Youth Impact Report.

== Filmography ==
=== Film ===
Year	Title	Role	Notes
2017	The Greatest Showman	Barnum Boy	uncredited
2018	To Dust	Naphtali	
2018	In the Heart of the Country	Pedersen Kid	short film
2019	Helen	Jason	short film
2019	Happiness Begins Tour	Young Kevin	
2019	Uncut Gems	Arlo and Ida's son	
2020	This Is the Year	Dr. Spacecakes	
2020	How to be a Man	Mischa	
2020	Happiness Continues	Kevin Jonas	documentary

=== Television ===
Year	Title	Role	Notes
2015	MasterChef Junior (American season 5)	Himself	Episode: "New Kids on the Chopping Block (No. 4)"
2016	Food Network Star Kids	Himself	Episodes: "What's your story? (No. 1)", "Orange you glad it's brunch (No. 2)"
2016	Chopped Junior	Himself	Episode: "Bug Bites (No. 1)"
2017	Totally TV	Himself	Episode: "That's the Word (No. 3)"
2017	Blindspot	Foster Kid	Episode: "Senile Lines (No. 18)"
2017	The Late Show with Stephen Colbert	Wedgie Kid	Episode: "Idina Menzel/Rachel Bloom/Louie Anderson (No. 80)"
2017	The Late Show with Stephen Colbert	Alex Jones Son	Episode: "Alec Baldwin/Charlamagne Tha God/Moshe Kasher/Taj Mahal/Keb' Mo (No. 130)"
2017	The Late Show with Stephen Colbert	School Child	Episode: "Rose Byrne/Lewis Black/P.J. Harvey (No. 131)"
2017	The Americans	Vlad	Episode: "Dyatkovo (No. 11)"
2018	Nannyhood	Vann	Episode: "Pilot (No. 1)"
2018	Homeland	Cooper	Episode: "Standoff (No. 3)"
2019	Law & Order:Special Victims Unit	Young Micah	Episode: "Facing Demons (No. 16)"
2019	Modern Family	Young Luke	Episode: "Snapped (No. 2)"
2019	The Deuce	Jake Dwyer	Episodes: "Morta Di Fame (No. 2)", "Normal is a Lie (No. 3)", "They Can Never Go Home (No. 4)", "This Trust Thing (No. 6)"
2019	Pen15	Techie	Episodes: "Season 2 (No. 1, 2, 3)"

=== New Media ===
Year	Title	Role
2016	Food Network Star Kids Snap Chat	Himself
2017	Eat it or Wear It	Himself
2017	Fungi by a Fun Guy	Himself
2017	How to Clear a House	Himself
2018	Gone Fishing	Himself
2018	Halloween	Himself

=== Commercial ===
Year	Company	Role	Title
2017	Liberty Mutual	Football Son	"Can't Breathe"
2018	Mattel	Himself	"B is for Barbie"
2018	TD Ameritrade	Paperboy	"It's Time"
2019	Dairy Queen	Son	"2 for $4"

=== Music videos ===
Year	Artist	Title
2017	Gumzoo	Happy Home
2019	Jonas Brothers	Happiness Begins

== Awards and nominations ==
Year	Award	Category	Work	Result	Refs
2016	Food Network	Best Snap Chat tip	Food Network Star Kids	Won	
2018	Melbourne International Film Festival	Best Short Fiction Film	Helen	Won	
2018	Hollywood Just4Shorts	Best TV Pilot Script	Nannyhood	Won	
2018	Tribeca Film Festival	Audience Award	To Dust	Won	
2020	Independent Spirit Award	Best Screenplay	To Dust	Nominated	
