= Pete Scobell =

- Born: 1977 (age 48–49); Pennsylvania
- Genre: Country
- Occupations: Singer, Navy SEAL (Ret.)
- Instrument: Vocals
- Years active: 2015-present
- Label: Independent

Pete Scobell is an American country music singer and retired Navy SEAL. A former member of the United States Navy SEALs, Scobell began his musical career in 2015.

== Biography ==
Pete Scobell was born in Pennsylvania in 1977. His mother died when he was ten months old, and left behind a number of musical instruments which inspired his interest in music.

Scobell served in the United States Navy for 17 years, including membership in the United States Navy SEALs and six deployments in combat. In the early 2010s, he retired from the military following a brain injury he received in combat and resumed playing music as a form of therapy. This led to him being invited to record an original song titled "The Ones I Stand Beside" for The Hornet's Nest, a 2014 documentary about the 2001 Afghanistan War. In doing so, he met singer Wynonna Judd and her husband, Cactus Moser. Moser recommended the two record the song "Hearts I Leave Behind", written by Travis Meadows in 2013 as a tribute to Chris Kyle, a Navy SEAL who was murdered that same year. Judd and Scobell recorded the song and released it independently via iTunes, with all proceeds donated to the Chris Kyle Frog Foundation. Additionally, Scobell toured as an opening act for Judd that same year.

This was followed in 2015 by a second single titled "Wild", accompanied by a music video. "Wild" was also included on Scobell's debut album Walkin' a Wire, released in 2016. The project featured musicians from Judd's backing band the Big Noise including Moser, who also produced it.

In 2025, Scobell was named vice president of Datavault AI, an artificial intelligence company.

== Personal life ==
Pete Scobell is the father of film and television actor Walker Scobell.

== Discography ==
- Walkin' a Wire (2016)

Year	Single	Peak chart positions	
Year	Single	US Bubbling	US Country
2015	"Hearts I Leave Behind" (with Wynonna Judd)	21	30
