= Double Walker =

2021 American supernatural horror thriller film

- Directed by: Colin West
- Written by: Colin West
- Produced by: Sylvie Mix
- Starring: Sylvie Mix; Maika Carter; Justin Rose; Tina Matthews
- Distributed by: Cranked Up Films
- Release date: November 12, 2021
- Running time: 71 minutes
- Country: United States
- Language: English

Double Walker is a 2021 American supernatural horror thriller film directed by Colin West, starring Sylvie Mix. The story follows a young ghost (Mix) who investigates her own murder and then takes revenge on the men who were responsible.

It was released in theaters and VOD release in the United States by Cranked Up Films on November 12, 2021.

== Reception ==
The film has an 80 percent rating on Rotten Tomatoes based on 10 reviews.
