= Val McDermid =

Scottish crime novel writer (born 1955)

Val McDermid FRSE FRSL
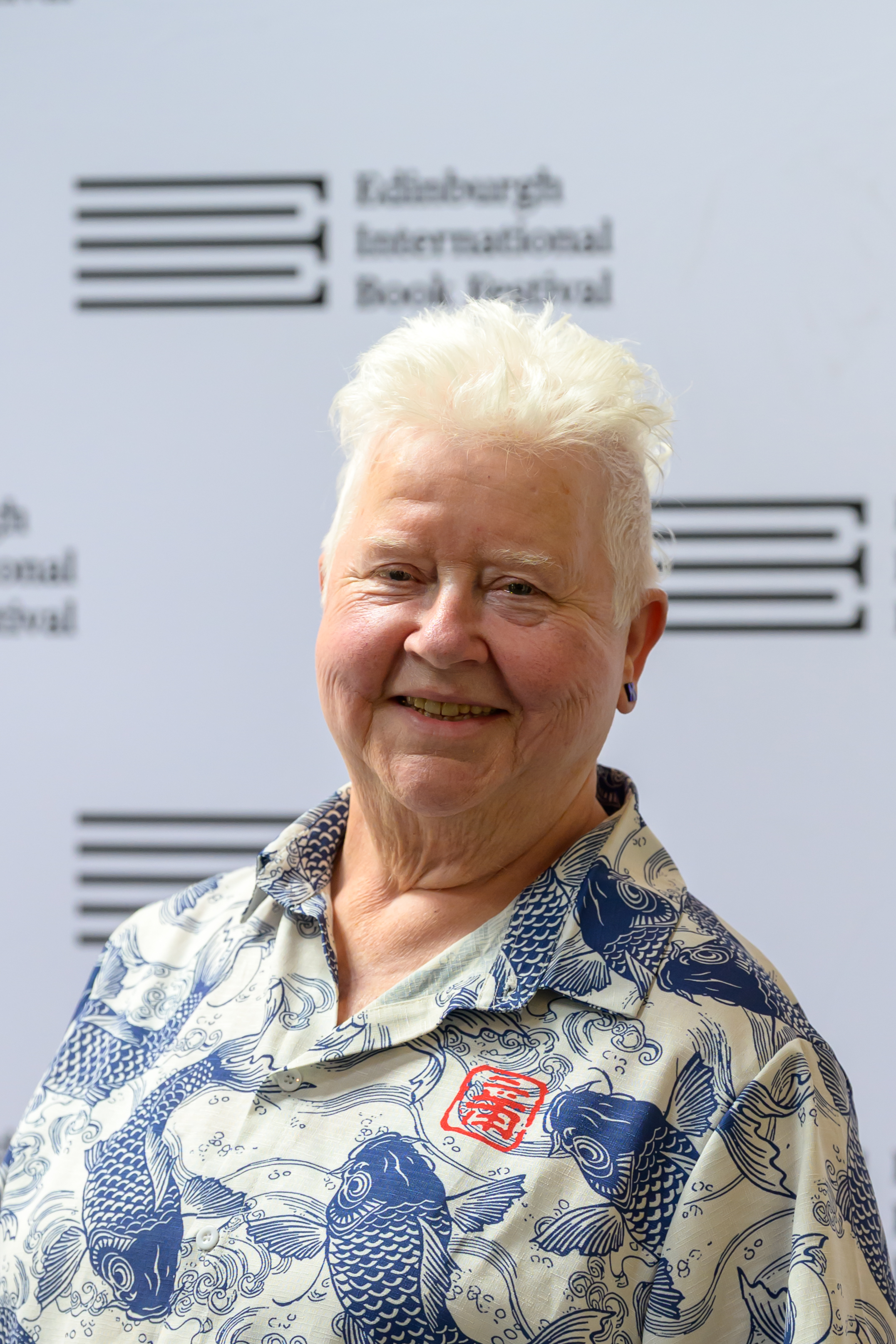
- McDermid in 2026
- Born: 4 June 1955 (age 71); Kirkcaldy, Fife, Scotland
- Education: St Hilda's College, Oxford
- Occupation: Writer
- Spouse: Jo Sharp (m. 2016)
- Writing career
- Genre: Crime fiction
- Website: www.valmcdermid.com

Valerie McDermid (born 4 June 1955) is a Scottish crime writer of more than 30 novels. Her work is considered part of a sub-genre known as Tartan Noir, and is known for uncompromising depictions of violence. Her books have received numerous awards, including the Crime Writers' Association Gold Dagger Award and the Cartier Diamond Dagger Award.

McDermid is best known for a series of novels featuring clinical psychologist Dr. Tony Hill and his collaborators in the police department. This series was adapted for television, running from 2002 to 2008, and known as Wire in the Blood. The television series Karen Pirie (2022–present), was also adapted from her books featuring the character of the same name.

McDermid also writes for the British press, and often broadcasts on BBC Radio 4 and BBC Radio Scotland.

== Life and career ==
McDermid comes from a working-class family in Fife. She studied English at St Hilda's College, Oxford, where she was the first student to be admitted from a Scottish state school.

After graduation, she became a journalist and began her literary career as a dramatist. Her first success as a novelist, Report for Murder: The First Lindsay Gordon Mystery, was published in 1987.

McDermid was inducted into the prestigious Detection Club in 2000. In 2010 she won the CWA Diamond Dagger for her lifetime contribution to crime writing in the English language. She was awarded an honorary doctorate by the University of Sunderland in 2011.

She is co-founder of the Harrogate Crime Writing Festival and the Theakston's Old Peculier Crime Novel of the Year Award, part of the Harrogate International Festivals. In 2016, she captained a team of St Hilda's alumnæ to win the Christmas University Challenge.

In 2017, McDermid was elected a Fellow of the Royal Society of Edinburgh, as well as a Fellow of the Royal Society of Literature.

In 2025, McDermid was awarded an honorary degree from University of Edinburgh.

=== Raith Rovers ===
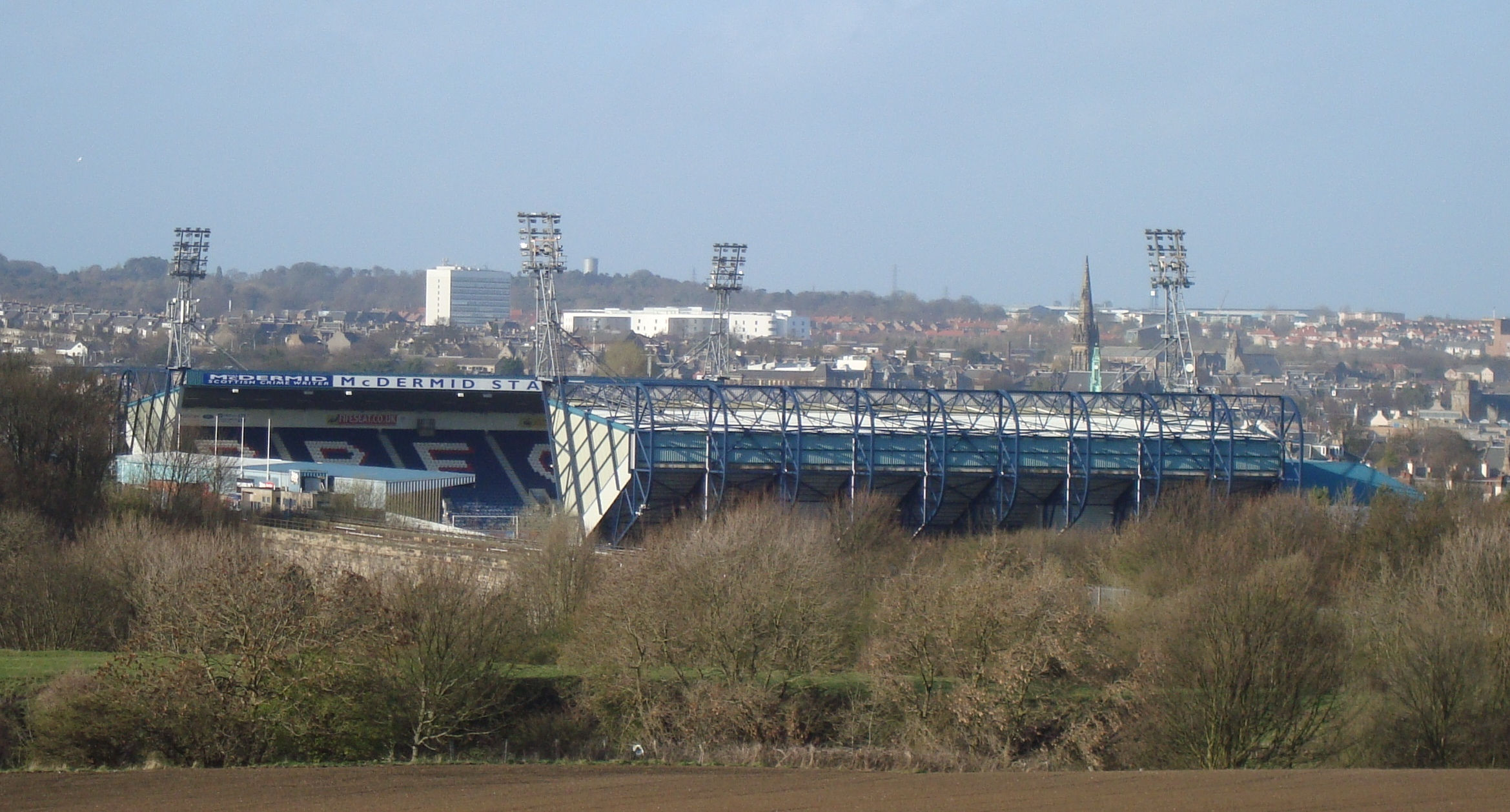
Stark's Park in Kirkcaldy, the home ground of Raith Rovers football club. The McDermid Stand is visible to the left.

McDermid was a lifelong fan of Raith Rovers football club, her father having worked as a scout for the club. In 2010, she sponsored the McDermid Stand at Stark's Park, the club's ground in Kirkcaldy, in honour of her father.

A year after sponsoring the stand, she became a board member of the club, and starting in 2014 her website became Raith's shirt sponsor.

In February 2022, McDermid said she would be withdrawing her support and sponsorship from Raith Rovers after the club signed striker David Goodwillie, who had been ruled to have raped a woman and made to pay damages in a civil case in 2017. Following the signing of Goodwillie, Raith Rovers women's team severed ties with the main club and renamed themselves McDermid Ladies, after the writer. McDermid moved her sponsorship to the new ladies' team.

=== Ink attack ===
On 6 December 2012, a woman poured ink over McDermid during a book signing event at the University of Sunderland. Sandra Botham, a 64-year-old woman from Sunderland, was convicted of common assault, received a 12-month community order with supervision and was made to pay £50 compensation and a £60 victim surcharge.

== Personal life ==
McDermid lives in Fife and Edinburgh. In 2010, she was living between Northumberland and Manchester with publisher Kelly Smith, with whom she had entered into a civil partnership in 2006.

On 23 October 2016, McDermid married her partner of two years, Jo Sharp, at the time a professor of geography at the University of Glasgow. Sharp has been Geographer Royal for Scotland since 2022.

In 2016, McDermid captained a team of crime writer challengers on the TV quiz Eggheads, beating the Eggheads and winning £14,000.

== Political views ==
McDermid is a feminist and a socialist. She has incorporated feminism into some of her novels.

In July 2026, McDermid was among 120 people who wrote an open letter, organised by Patriotic Millionaires, to Prime Minister Andy Burnham, in which they asked to be taxed more.

== Published works ==
McDermid's works fall into five series:

- Lindsay Gordon (journalist)
- Kate Brannigan (private investigator)
- Tony Hill (clinical psychologist) and DCI Carol Jordan
- DCI Karen Pirie
- Allie Burns (investigative reporter)

The Mermaids Singing, the first book in the Hill/Jordan series by Val McDermid, won the Crime Writers' Association Gold Dagger for Best Crime Novel of the Year. The Hill/Jordan series has been adapted for television under the name Wire in the Blood, starring Robson Green and running from 2002 to 2008. Another series adapted from McDermid's books is the eponymous Karen Pirie.

McDermid has said that her character of Jacko Vance, a TV celebrity with a secret lust for torture, murder and under-age girls, who she featured in Wire in the Blood and two later books, is based on her direct personal experience of interviewing Jimmy Savile.

In addition to writing novels, McDermid contributes to several British newspapers and often broadcasts on BBC Radio 4 and BBC Radio Scotland. Her novels, in particular the Tony Hill series, are known for their graphic depictions of violence and torture.

In 2010, McDermid received the Cartier Diamond Dagger from the Crime Writers' Association for "outstanding achievement in the field of crime writing".

McDermid considers her work to be part of the "Tartan Noir" Scottish crime fiction genre.

In August 2022, McDermid reported that the estate of Agatha Christie had threatened her publishers with legal action if they referred to McDermid as "the Queen of Crime". They said that the term was a trade mark of the Christie estate.

=== Lindsay Gordon series ===
- Report for Murder (1987)
- Common Murder (1989)
- Final Edition (1991) US Titles: Open and Shut, Deadline for Murder
- Union Jack (1993), US Title: Conferences Are Murder
- Booked for Murder (1996)
- Hostage to Murder (2003)

=== Kate Brannigan series ===
- Dead Beat (1992)
- Kick Back (1993)
- Crack Down (1994)
- Clean Break (1995)
- Blue Genes (1996)
- Star Struck (1998) (awarded Grand Prix des Romans d'Aventure in 1998)

=== Tony Hill and Carol Jordan series ===
- The Mermaids Singing (1995) (Crime Writers' Association Gold Dagger for Best Crime Novel of the Year in 1995)
- The Wire in the Blood (1997)
- The Last Temptation (2002)
- The Torment of Others (2004)
- Beneath the Bleeding (2007)
- Fever of the Bone (2009)
- The Retribution (2011)
- Cross and Burn (2013)
- Splinter the Silence (2015)
- Insidious Intent (2017)
- How the Dead Speak (2019)

=== Inspector Karen Pirie series ===
- The Distant Echo (2003)
- A Darker Domain (2008)
- The Skeleton Road (2014)
- Out of Bounds (2016)
- Broken Ground (2018)
- Still Life (2020)
- Past Lying (2023)
- Silent Bones (2025)

=== Allie Burns series ===
- 1979 (2021)
- 1989 (2022)
- 1999 (TBC)
- 2009 (TBC)
- 2019 (TBC)

=== The Austen Project ===
- Northanger Abbey (2014)

=== Other books ===
- The Writing on the Wall (1997); short stories, limited edition of 200 copies
- A Place of Execution (1999)
- Killing the Shadows (2000)
- Stranded (2005); short stories
- Cleanskin (2006)
- The Grave Tattoo (2006)
- Trick of the Dark (2010) dedicated to Mary Bennett (1913–2003) & Kathy Vaughan Wilkes (1946–2003)
- The Vanishing Point (2012)
- Resistance: A Graphic Novel (2021), illustrated by Kathryn Briggs (Profile Books/Wellcome Collection, London, ISBN 978-1-78816-3552)
- The Second Murder at the Vicarage in Marple, Twelve New Mysteries (2022) p. 33-52, (HarperCollins, New York, ISBN 978-0-06-313605-2)
- This Door of the Seas (2026), Val McDermid & Jo Sharp (Edinburgh, Polygon, ISBN 978-1-84697-746-6

=== Children's books ===
- My Granny is a Pirate (2012)
- The High Heid Yin's New Claes, published in The Itchy Coo Book o Hans Christian Andersen Fairy Tales in Scots (2020)

=== Non-fiction ===
- A Suitable Job for a Woman (HarperCollins, 1994)
- Forensics – The Anatomy of Crime (Profile Books & Wellcome Collection, 2014)

- Published in the United States under the title Forensics: What Bugs, Burns, Prints, DNA, and More Tell Us About Crime (Black Cat, 2015)

- My Scotland (Little, Brown, 2019)
- Imagine a Country (Little, Brown, 2020)
- Winter: The Story of a Season (Atlantic Monthly Press, 2025)
