= The Last Temptation (novel) =

2002 crime novel by Val McDermid

- First edition (publ. HarperCollins)
- Author: Val McDermid
- Publisher: Minotaur Books (US)
- Publication date: September 1, 2002
- ISBN: 0-312-29089-6 (US)

The Last Temptation (2002) is a crime novel by Scottish author Val McDermid, the third in her acclaimed Dr. Tony Hill series, which has been adapted into the ITV television drama Wire in the Blood, starring Robson Green. This particular novel served loosely as the basis for recent episode Falls the Shadow.

== Synopsis ==
Across northern Europe a sadistic serial killer has been gruesomely drowning experimental psychologists. The case takes on a rare personal aspect for Tony Hill when one of his friends falls victim. Meanwhile Carol Jordan has gone undercover in Germany on the trail of crime kingpins. However Tony and Carol are caught together. The kingpin Tadeusz Radecki rapes Carol and tries to kill Tony. Afterwards Tony confronts Wilhelm Mann, the skipper of the barge Wilhelmina Rosen, who was killing psychologists because he was abused by his grandfather, who was experimented on by the Nazis. This culminates in Wilhelm being shot and killed.
