= Fiona Shaw (novelist) =

British novelist and academic

- Born: 16 February 1964 (age 62); London, England
- Education: University of York, University of Sussex
- Occupations: Author, academic
- Children: 2
- Website: www.fiona-shaw.com

Fiona Shaw (born 16 February 1964) is a British novelist and academic. She has written a memoir as well as fiction for adults and children.

== Personal life ==
Shaw was born in London where she grew up the eldest of three daughters in a house in south London near the Thames. She has two daughters and currently lives in York with her partner.

== Education ==
Shaw attended university and earned a BA (first class) in English Literature from the University of York, an MA in American Studies from the University of Sussex, and completed her academic studies with a PhD at University of York on the American poet Elizabeth Bishop.

== Career ==
Alongside writing, Shaw worked part-time in bookshops, as a waitress, as a bike courier (briefly), as a copywriter for web developers, as a reader for the Aitken Alexander literary agency, and finally as a creative writing teacher. She developed and delivered Creative Writing courses in both life writing and fiction, in a range of community settings. In 2007, Shaw received a Royal Literary Fund (RLF) writing grant award, and she worked as an RLF Writing Fellow at her alma mater, University of York from 2007 to 2009 and then at the University of Sheffield, in the Animal and Plant Sciences Department from 2010 to 2012.

Her debut work the memoir, Out of Me (Penguin, 1997) shortlisted for the MIND Prize.

She has held positions at universities across Yorkshire, as Visiting Lecturer at York St John University from 2006 to 2012, Visiting Tutor at Hull and York Medical School (2008–2012). In 2011, she was John Tilney Writer in Residence in the Department of English and Related Literature, University of York. She has given talks and readings nationally, including literary festivals in Belfast, Beverley, Cambridge, Dartington, Derbyshire, Edinburgh, Hexham, Kendal, London, Morley and York (1997– ongoing).

Her books have been published in the USA, France, Germany and Norway and several of Shaw's novels have been selected for nomination for the Booker Prize, the Costa Prize and the Orange Prize. A Stone's Throw was selected for a New Writing North Read Regional award in 2012. She has been awarded several writing residences notably the Hawthornden Fellowship in 2010 and 2016 and the International Writer's Residency in 2007 and 2016 and Arts Council England Grants for the Arts Award in 2015.

Shaw's third novel Tell it to the Bees has been shot as a feature film, with BFI, Creative Scotland and other European funding. Directed by Annabel Jankel, it stars Anna Paquin, Holliday Grainger and 10 year old Gregor Selkirk. It premiered at the Toronto Film Festival in September 2018.

Shaw currently works as Senior Lecturer in Creative Writing, Northumbria University. Her debut young adult novel, Outwalkers, was published in 2018, nominated for the 2019 CILIP Carnegie medal. longlisted for the 2019 Branford Boase Award, and shortlisted for the 2019 YA Book Prize.

=== Publications ===
==== Non-fiction ====
- Out of Me: The Story of a Postnatal Breakdown (Penguin, 1997)

==== Fiction ====
- The Sweetest Thing (Virago, 2003)
- The Picture She Took (Virago, 2005)
- Tell it to the Bees (Tindal Street, 2009)
- A Stone's Throw (Serpent's Tail, 2012)
- Outwalkers (David Fickling Books, 2018), USA publication (Scholastic, Feb 2019)
