= Tell It to the Bees =

2018 film by Annabel Jankel

- Theatrical release poster
- Directed by: Annabel Jankel
- Screenplay by: Henrietta Ashworth; Jessica Ashworth
- Based on: Tell It to the Bees by Fiona Shaw
- Produced by: Daisy Allsop; Nick Hill; Annabel Jankel; Nik Bower; Laure Vaysse
- Starring: Anna Paquin; Holliday Grainger; Emun Elliott; Kate Dickie; Lauren Lyle
- Narrated by: Billy Boyd
- Cinematography: Bartosz Nalazek
- Edited by: Jon Harris; Maya Maffioli
- Music by: Claire M Singer
- Production companies: Reliance Entertainment Productions 8; Archface Films; Taking A Line For A Walk; Riverstone Pictures; Cayenne Film Company; Motion Picture Capital
- Distributed by: Vertigo Releasing
- Release dates: 9 September 2018 (Toronto); 26 July 2019 (United Kingdom)
- Running time: 106 minutes
- Country: United Kingdom
- Language: English

Tell It to the Bees is a 2018 British historical romantic drama film, directed by Annabel Jankel and starring Anna Paquin and Holliday Grainger. The screenplay by Henrietta and Jessica Ashworth is based on the 2009 novel of the same name by Fiona Shaw.

The film had its world premiere at the Toronto International Film Festival as a Special Presentation on 9 September 2018. Tell It to the Bees opened in limited release in the United States on 3 May 2019. It was released theatrically in the United Kingdom on 26 July 2019.

== Plot ==
With her marriage failing, Lydia starts to connect with the town's new doctor Jean, who bonds with Lydia's son Charlie after he takes an interest in her bee colonies. However, in 1950s rural Scotland, the women's relationship raises questions after the mother and son start to live with her after they get evicted.

== Cast ==
- Anna Paquin as Jean Markham
- Holliday Grainger as Lydia Weekes
- Emun Elliott as Robert Weekes
- Lauren Lyle as Annie Cranmer
- Gregor Selkirk as Charlie Weekes
- Billy Boyd as adult Charlie vocal narrator
- Kate Dickie as Pam Cranmer
- Steven Robertson as Jim

== Production ==
=== Development ===
In June 2012, the original screenplay written by Irena Brignull was presented to the British Film Institute (BFI). Funding for the project was thereafter secured from the BFI Film Fund and Creative Scotland. The initial production budget in 2015 was £5 million.

In May 2017, the producers announced that Holliday Grainger was to star in the film. In August 2017, Anna Paquin joined the cast as Doctor Jean Markham. Unlike the novel, which is set in Yorkshire, the film takes place in southern Scotland.

Tell It to the Bees is produced by Reliance Entertainment Productions 8, Archface Films, Taking A Line For A Walk, Riverstone Pictures, Cayenne Film Company, Motion Picture Capital; and co-produced by Filmgate Films, Twickenham Studios and Film i Väst. Film Constellation handled international distribution rights.

The North American rights were acquired from Film Constellation by Good Deed Entertainment on 30 October 2018. Distribution rights for Germany, Spain, Korea, and Taiwan were sold on 4 November 2018, followed by rights to Australia, New Zealand, Scandinavia, and Poland on 7 February 2019, as well as acquisition by Vertigo Releasing for the United Kingdom.

=== Filming ===
Principal photography began on 10 August 2017 in Scotland, with filming near Stirling.

== Soundtrack ==
The original score was written by Scottish composer Claire M Singer. The soundtrack album was released on 3 May 2019.

== Release ==
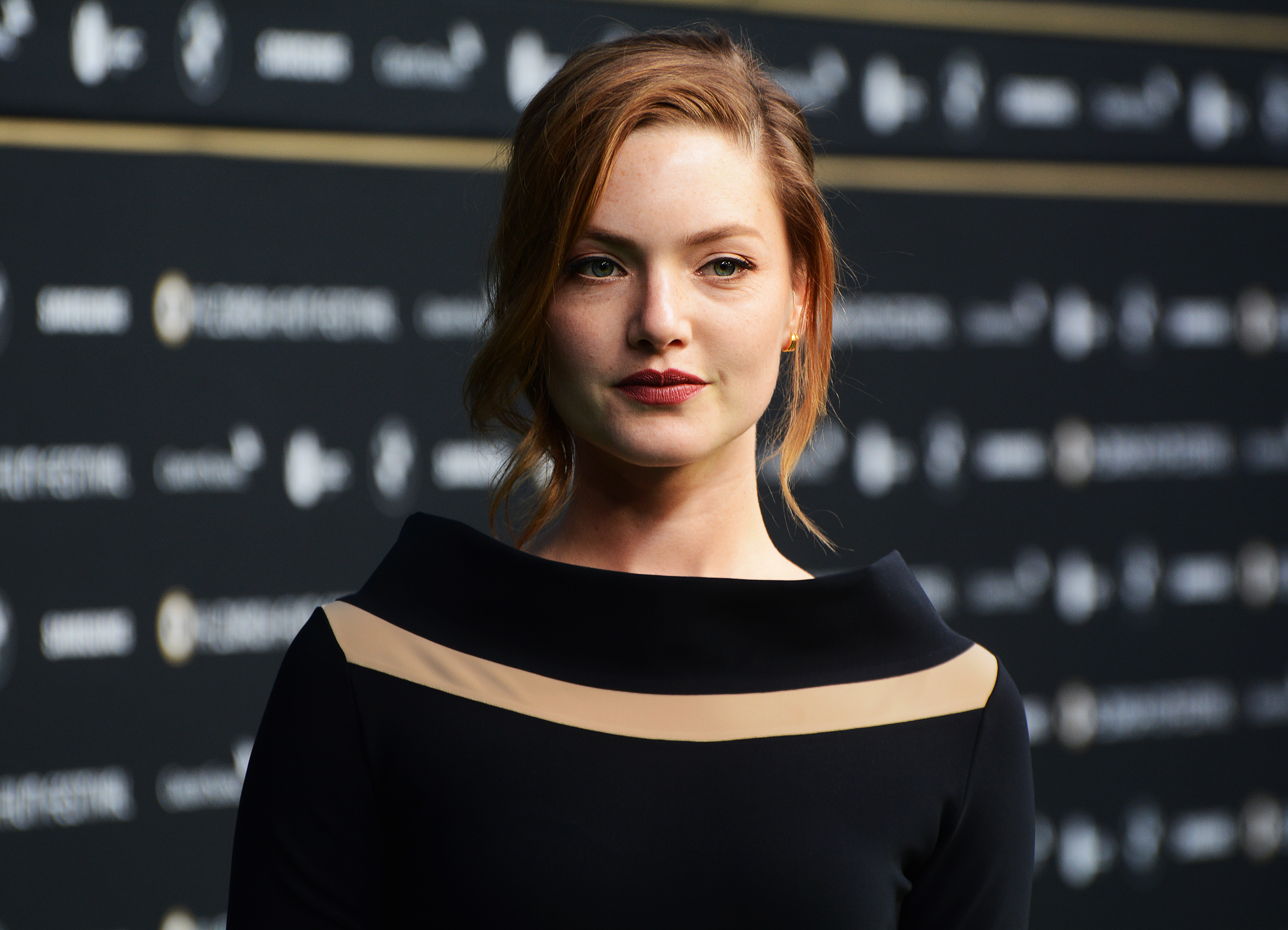
Holliday Grainger during Gala premiere of Tell It to the Bees at the 2018 Zurich Film Festival.

Tell It to the Bees premiered at the Toronto International Film Festival on 9 September 2018. The first movie clip was released on 6 September in advance of the world premiere.

It premiered in limited theatrical release in the U.S. on 3 May 2019.

=== Home media ===
In the U.S., the film was made available as VOD on 3 May 2019.

== Reception ==
=== Critical response ===
On the review aggregator website Rotten Tomatoes, 49% of 57 critics' reviews are positive, with an average rating of 5.2/10. The website's consensus reads: "Tell It to the Bees is well-acted and well-intentioned — but often undermined by its frustratingly didactic storytelling." Metacritic, which uses a weighted average, assigned the film a score of 50 out of 100, based on 13 critics, indicating "mixed or average" reviews.

== See also ==
- List of LGBT-related films directed by women
