= Taqi Nazeer =

Scottish actor

- Born: Taqi Nazeer; Edinburgh, Scotland
- Occupation: Actor
- Years active: 2010–present

Taqi Nazeer (/ˈtækaɪ/ TAK-eye;) is a Scottish born actor.

== Early life ==
Nazeer was born in Edinburgh, Scotland. He attended George Heriot's School and went on to study at Heriot-Watt University, where he obtained a Master of Arts in Marketing. Soon after, Nazeer was accepted on a one-year traineeship at BBC Scotland where he was trained in TV and radio presenting. Nazeer attended The Royal Scottish Academy of Music and Drama.

== Career ==
Nazeer received his first professional role whilst still in his final year at The Royal Scottish Academy of Music and Drama. Nazeer was chosen to play overly confident boxer Ajay Chopra in the Fringe First production of Beautiful Burnout, a co-production between The National Theatre of Scotland and the theatre company Frantic Assembly. In preparation, Nazeer trained for eight months with championship boxers and MMA fighters.

== Theatre credits ==
- The Deranged Marriage, Rifco Arts (2015) – Mahesh
- Beautiful Burnout (2010/11) – Ajay Chopra
- Black Snow, (2010) – Ivan Vasilyevich
- Words are Never Wasted, Scottish Tour (2009) – Michael
- Heer Ranjha, The Tramway Theatre (2008) – Ranjha
- Detainee A, The Arches (2007) – Yusef
