= Holliday Grainger =

English actress (born 1988)

- Grainger in 2026
- Born: Holliday Clark Grainger; 27 March 1988 (age 38); Didsbury, Manchester, England
- Other name: Holly Grainger
- Education: University of Leeds and Open University
- Occupation: Actress
- Years active: 1994–present
- Notable work: Strike; The Capture; The Borgias; Bonnie & Clyde
- Partner: Harry Treadaway (2015–present)
- Children: 2

Holliday Clark Grainger (born 27 March 1988), also credited as Holly Grainger, is an English screen and stage actress. Some of her prominent roles are Kate Beckett in the BAFTA award-winning children's series Roger and the Rottentrolls, Lucrezia Borgia in the Showtime series The Borgias, Robin Ellacott in the BBC One crime drama Strike, Rachel Carey in the Peacock/BBC One conspiracy thriller The Capture, and Estella in Mike Newell's 2012 film adaptation of Charles Dickens' 1861 novel Great Expectations.

== Early life ==
Grainger was born on 27 March 1988 in Didsbury, Manchester. Her maternal grandfather was Italian. Her first experience of acting was at the age of five when she was scouted for a BBC TV series. She appeared in many television shows and independent films as a child actress.

Grainger attended Parrs Wood High School from 1999 to 2006, and in 2007 began studying for a degree in English literature at the University of Leeds; however, she eventually opted for The Open University, as it allowed her to continue acting alongside her studies.

== Career ==
Roles followed in Casualty, Doctors and Dalziel and Pascoe. Grainger played Megan Boothe in Where the Heart Is, Stacey Appleyard in Waterloo Road and Sophia in Merlin. In 2011, she appeared in the television series The Borgias, playing Lucrezia Borgia opposite Jeremy Irons as Pope Alexander VI. The series, created by Neil Jordan and shot in Hungary, ran for three seasons.

After her role as Emily in the film The Scouting Book for Boys (2009), she played one of the Rivers sisters opposite Mia Wasikowska and Michael Fassbender in Cary Fukunaga's 2011 retelling of Jane Eyre, and had a minor role in Bel Ami alongside Robert Pattinson and Uma Thurman. In June 2011, she was cast in the leading role of Estella in Mike Newell's film adaptation of Great Expectations, opposite Jeremy Irvine and Helena Bonham Carter. The movie, screened at Toronto International Film Festival 2012, had its European premiere as the closing night film of the BFI London Film Festival. She had a minor role in the 2012 film Anna Karenina as Baroness Shilton.

On stage, in 2013 she appeared in Disassociation, a play by Luke Bailey, at The Lowry in Salford. In the same year, she played Bonnie Parker in the 2013 TV mini-series Bonnie & Clyde. She was one of the female leads in the 2014 film The Riot Club, adapted from the play Posh, alongside Max Irons. In the same year, she appeared on stage in Anton Chekhov's play Three Sisters at the Southwark Playhouse. Grainger played Cinderella's stepsister Anastasia Tremaine in Kenneth Branagh's 2015 film version of Cinderella.

In 2016, Grainger starred in Disney's The Finest Hours. On 20 June 2016, World Refugee Day, Grainger, as well as Jack O'Connell, featured in a film from the United Nations' refugee agency UNHCR to help raise awareness of the global refugee crisis. The film, titled Home, has a family take a reverse migration into the middle of a war zone. It is inspired by primary accounts of refugees, and is part of UNHCR's #WithRefugees campaign, which also includes a petition to governments to expand asylum to provide further shelter, integrating job opportunities, and education. Home, written and directed by Daniel Mulloy, went on to win a BAFTA Award and a Gold Lion at Cannes Lions International Festival of Creativity among many other awards.

In 2017, she appeared in a film adaptation of the novel Tulip Fever alongside Alicia Vikander. From 2017, she plays Robin Ellacott in the TV series Strike (aired in the United States and Canada as C.B. Strike) based on the novels by J. K. Rowling. Grainger played one of the two lead female roles in the feature film Animals, along with Alia Shawkat. Based on the novel by Emma Jane Unsworth, who also wrote the script, the film was directed by Sophie Hyde and filmed in Dublin. In 2018, she co-starred in the film Tell It to the Bees alongside Anna Paquin, an adaptation of the 2009 novel of the same name by Fiona Shaw. Since 2019, Grainger stars in the BBC conspiracy thriller The Capture.

== Personal life ==
In May 2021, she had twin children with her partner Harry Treadaway, himself a twin (brother of Luke Treadaway).

== Acting credits ==
=== Film ===
Year	Title	Role
2009	The Scouting Book for Boys	Emily
2009	Awaydays	Molly Carty
2010	Colette	Colette
2011	Jane Eyre	Diana Rivers
2012	Great Expectations	Estella Havisham
2012	Anna Karenina	Baroness
2012	Bel Ami	Suzanne Rousset
2012	Rachael	Samantha
2014	The Riot Club	Lauren
2014	Goblin?	Liz
2015	Cinderella	Anastasia Tremaine
2016	Home	Holly
2016	The Finest Hours	Miriam Webber
2017	Tulip Fever	Maria
2017	My Cousin Rachel	Louise
2017	Robot & Scarecrow	Robot
2018	Tell It to the Bees	Lydia Weekes
2019	Animals	Laura
2025	Mickey 17	Red Hair
TBA	Halo of Stars	Emm

=== Television ===
Year	Title	Role	Notes
1994–1997	All Quiet on the Preston Front	Kirsty	Main Role
1997	The Missing Postman	Harriet	Television Film
1998–2000	Roger and the Rottentrolls	Kate Beckett	Main Role (Series 3-4)
2000	Daddyfox	Young Maggie	Television Film
2000	Casualty	Katie Stoppard	Episode: "Seize the Night"
2000	Comin' Atcha!	Pauline	Episode: "The Day Off"
2001	Dalziel and Pascoe	Nichola Crowley	Episode: "Walls of Silence"
2001	Doctors	Nita Harmer	Episode: "Writing to Charlie"
2002	Sparkhouse	Older Lisa Bolton	Miniseries; Main Role
2003	The Illustrated Mum	Star Westward	Television Film
2003	The Royal	Carole Green	Episode: "Coffin Fit"
2003–2005	Where the Heart Is	Megan Boothe	Main Role (Series 7–9)
2005	Magnificent 7	Louise Jackson	Television Film
2005	Doctors	Holly Leavis	Episode: "Indestructible"
2005	No Angels	Simone	Series 2, Episode 5
2006	New Street Law	Katie Lewis	Series 1; Episode 1
2006	Johnny and the Bomb	Rose Bushell	Miniseries; Main Role
2007	Waterloo Road	Stacey Appleyard	Series 2; 4 Episodes
2007	The Bad Mother's Handbook	Charlotte Cooper	Television Film
2008	Merlin	Sophia	Series 1; Episode 7
2008	Waking the Dead	Nicola Bennet	Series 7; Episodes 5 & 6
2008	Dis/Connected	Jenny	Television Film
2008	Fairy Tales	Leeza Gruff	Episode: "Billy Goat"
2008	The Royal Today	Abigail	Series 1; Episode 3
2008	M.I. High	Leah Retsam	Episode: "It's a Kind of Magic"
2009	Blue Murder	Jess Burgess	Episode: "Having It All"
2009	Robin Hood	Meg	Episode: "A Dangerous Deal"
2009	Mark's Brilliant Blog	Mary	Television Film
2009	Demons	Ruby	Miniseries; Main Role
2010	Any Human Heart	Tess Scabius	Miniseries; 2 Episodes
2010	Stanley Park	Dirty Debbie	Episode: "Pilot"
2010	Five Daughters	Alice	Miniseries; 2 Episodes
2010	Above Suspicion	Sharon Bilkin	Main Role (Series 2)
2011–2013	The Borgias	Lucrezia Borgia	Main Role
2013	Bonnie & Clyde	Bonnie Parker	Miniseries; Lead Role
2015	Lady Chatterley's Lover	Lady Constance Chatterley	Television Film
2017	Philip K. Dick's Electric Dreams	Honor	Episode: "The Hood Maker"
2017–present	Strike	Robin Ellacott	Lead role
2018	Patrick Melrose	Bridget Watson-Scott	Miniseries; 2 Episodes
2019–present	The Capture	Rachel Carey	Lead role
2022	Impact Winter	Darcy Dunraven	Voice; Main Role
2025	The Stolen Girl	Rebecca Walsh	Miniseries; Main Role

=== Theatre ===
Year	Title	Role	Venue
2009	Dimetos	Lydia	Southwark Playhouse, London
2014	Three Sisters	Irina	Donmar Warehouse, London

== Accolades ==
Year	Award	Category	Nominated work	Result
2011	Golden Nymph Awards	Outstanding Actress in a Drama Series	The Borgias	Nominated
2013	Empire Awards	Best Female Newcomer	Great Expectations	Nominated
2014	Critics' Choice Television Awards	Best Actress in a Movie/Miniseries	Bonnie & Clyde	Nominated
2014	Satellite Awards	Best Actress in a Miniseries or Television Film	Bonnie & Clyde	Nominated
2019	Kingston Reelout Film Festival	Outstanding Lead Performance	Tell it to the Bees	Nominated
2019	British Independent Film Awards	Best Actress	Animals	Nominated
2022	TV Times Awards	Favourite Dramatic Performance	The Capture	Nominated
