= A Place of Execution =

1999 crime novel by Val McDermid

- First edition
- Author: Val McDermid
- Language: English
- Genre: Thriller
- Publisher: HarperCollins
- Publication date: 1999
- Publication place: United Kingdom
- Media type: Print (Hardback)
- Pages: 408 pp
- ISBN: 0-670-88909-1
- OCLC: 41432064

A Place of Execution is a crime novel by Val McDermid, first published in 1999. The novel won the Los Angeles Times Book Prize, the 2001 Dilys Award, was shortlisted for both the Gold Dagger and the Edgar Award, and was chosen by The New York Times as one of the most notable books of the year.

== Plot ==
The novel has two parallel storylines; the first, set in 1963, follows Detective Inspector George Bennett, who attempts to locate a missing girl in Derbyshire. The second, set in the present day, follows journalist Catherine Heathcote, whose plans to publish a story of the investigation are derailed when Bennett inexplicably stops cooperating and she attempts to find out why.

== Television adaptation ==
The novel was adapted for television by Patrick Harbinson and was made into a three-part drama shown on ITV (first episode screened 22 Sept 2008). Under the slightly different title, Place of Execution, the series was produced by Coastal Productions and ITV Productions. The series was nominated for The UK TV Dagger at the 2009 Crime Thriller Awards, and star Juliet Stevenson was awarded Best Actress. It also aired as a three-part series in November 2009 in the US as part of the anthology series Masterpiece: Contemporary!. The teleplay won the 2010 Edgar Award for best television episode teleplay from the Mystery Writers of America.

== Awards ==
- Dilys Award 2001
- Macavity Awards 2001
- Anthony Award 2001
