= Lorraine Dowler =

American geographer (born 1958)

Lorraine Dowler (born 1958) is an American geographer. Dowler is a professor of geography and of women's, gender, and sexuality studies at the Pennsylvania State University, where her scholarship focuses on geopolitics through a feminist lens. As of 2026, she is the vice president of the American Association of Geographers.

Born in 1958, Dowler attended Manhattan College for a B.S. degree in business administration, the SUNY College of Environmental Science and Forestry for a Master of Landscape Architecture degree, and Syracuse University for her Ph.D. in geography. Her dissertation, published in 1997, was on gendered prisons in Belfast, Northern Ireland.

Dowler joined Pennsylvania State University as an assistant professor in 1997. She became an associate professor in 2003 and professor in 2019, and served as department head of women's, gender, and sexuality studies from 2004 to 2007. In 2025, she was named Ruby S. and E. Willard Miller Professor of Geography.

The American Association of Geographers named Dowler their vice president for 2026 to 2027; she will serve as president of the association from 2027 to 2028.
