= List of awards and nominations received by Percy Jackson and the Olympians =

Percy Jackson and the Olympians awards and nominations
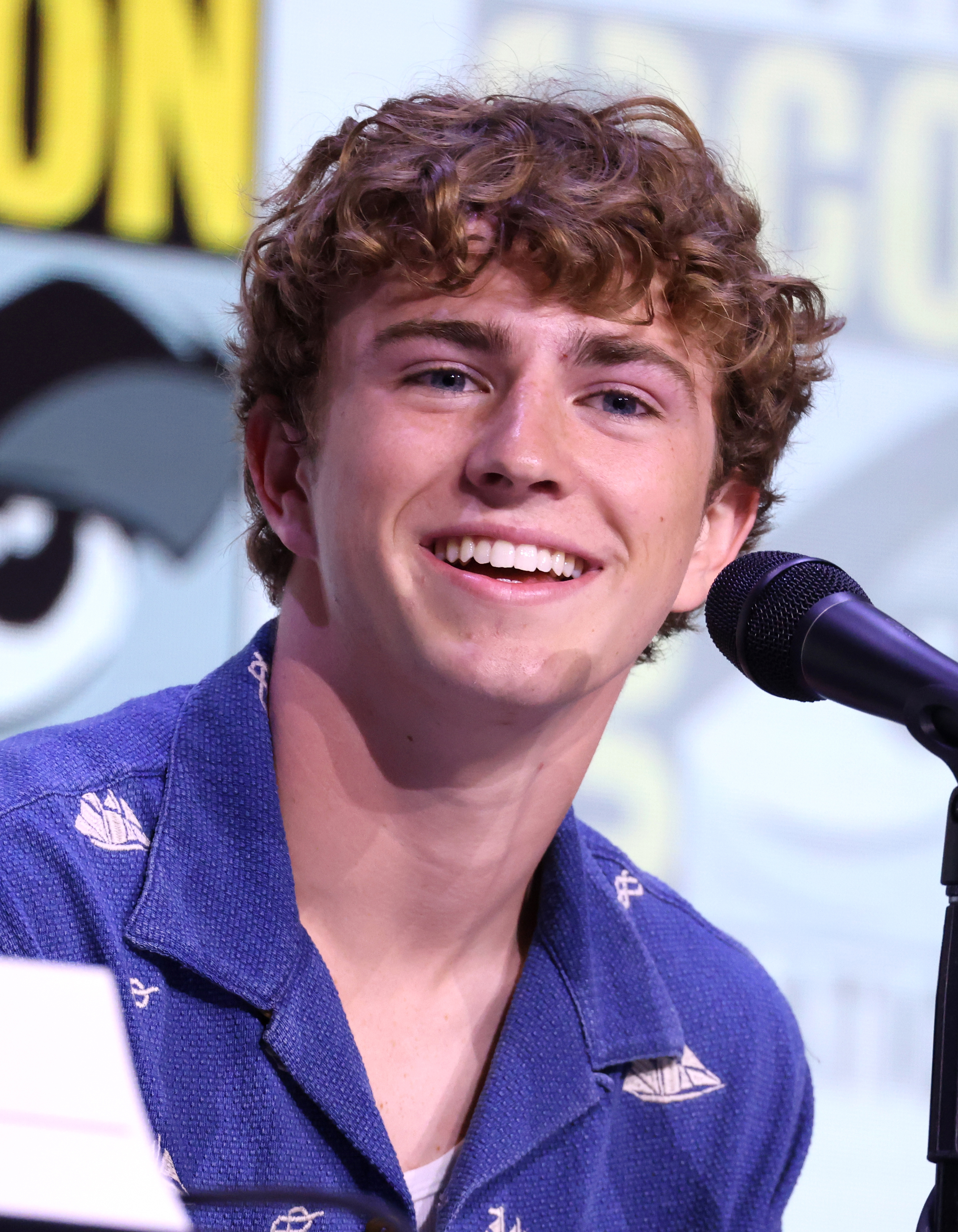
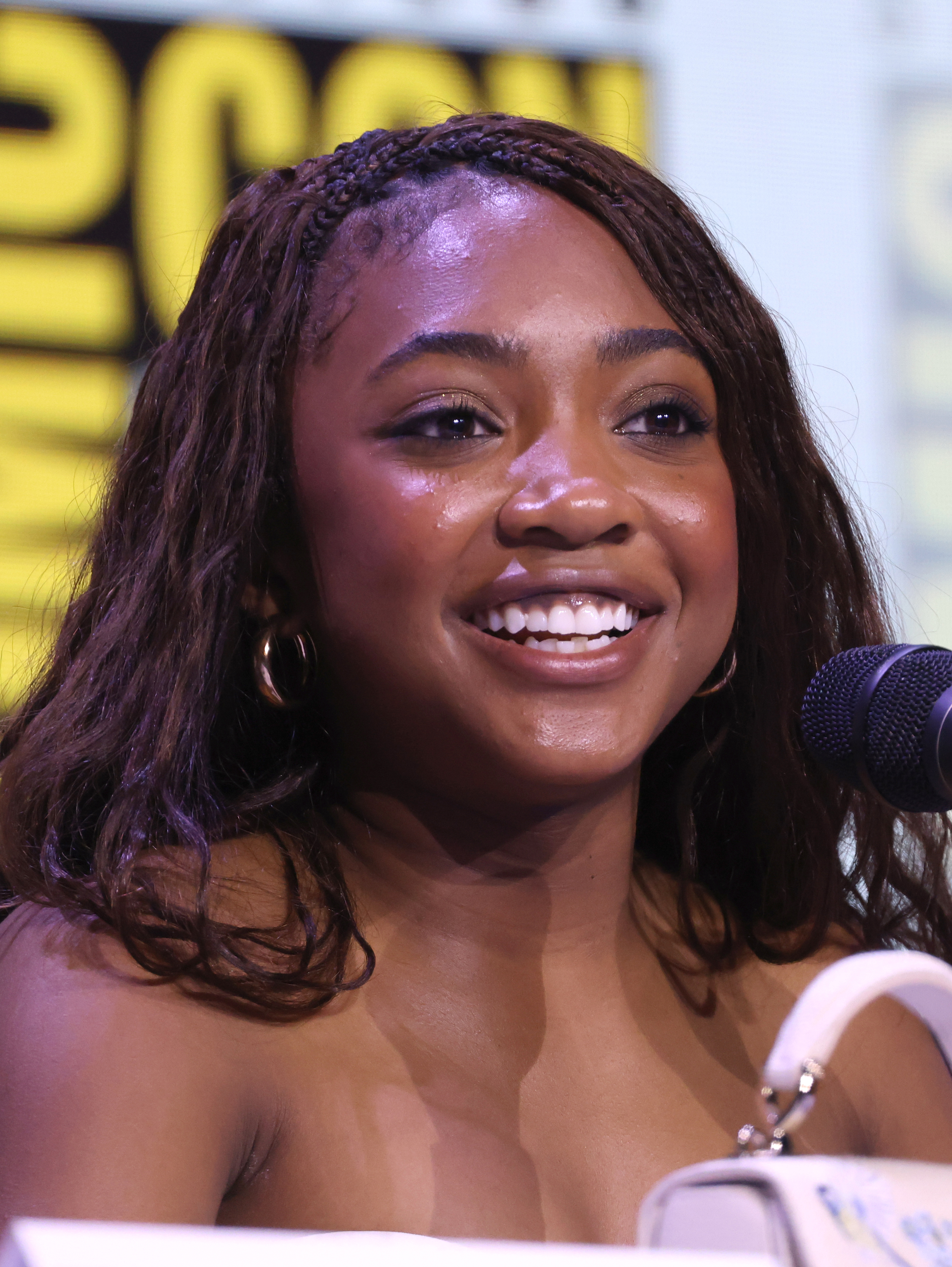
- Walker Scobell (left) and Leah Sava Jeffries (right) received various accolades for their performances as Percy Jackson and Annabeth Chase.
Awards and nominations
Award	Wins	Nominations
Directors Guild Awards	0	1
Emmy Awards	8	16
Producers Guild Awards	0	1
Writers Guild Awards	0	3

Totals (Note: Certain award groups do not simply award one winner. They acknowledge several different recipients, have runners-up, and have third place. Since this is a specific recognition and is different from losing an award, runner-up mentions are considered wins in this award tally. For simplification and to avoid errors, each award in this list has been presumed to have had a prior nomination.)
- Wins: 21
- Nominations: 68

Percy Jackson and the Olympians is an American fantasy adventure television series created by Rick Riordan and Jonathan E. Steinberg for streaming service Disney+, based on Riordan's book series of the same name. Walker Scobell stars as the titular character, alongside Leah Sava Jeffries as Annabeth Chase and Aryan Simhadri as Grover Underwood. The series premiered on December 19, 2023, and follows various demigods as they embark on quests in a world with the Greek gods in the 21st century.

The series has received positive reviews from critics, with the second season holding an approval rating of 100% based on 37 critic reviews on Rotten Tomatoes. Praise was given for its world-building, faithfulness to the source material, and performances (particularly those of Scobell and Jeffries). (Note: Attributed to multiple sources:) At the 3rd Children's and Family Emmy Awards, the show received a record sixteen nominations, ultimately winning eight, including Outstanding Young Teen Series. The first season also received nominations at the Directors, Producers and Writers Guilds of America Awards.

Many writing and directing nominations were for the first episode, "I Accidentally Vaporize My Pre-Algebra Teacher", with Emmy wins for writers Riordan and Steinberg, and director James Bobin. Composer Bear McCreary won two Emmys, including Outstanding Music Direction and Composition. From the cast, Scobell earned the Kids' Choice Award for Favorite Male TV Star and Jeffries won three consecutive NAACP Image Awards for Outstanding Performance by a Youth, alongside her Emmy nomination for Outstanding Younger Performer. At the same ceremony, Adam Copeland and Lance Reddick both received Emmy nominations for Outstanding Supporting Performer for their portrayals of Ares and Zeus, respectively.

== Major associations ==
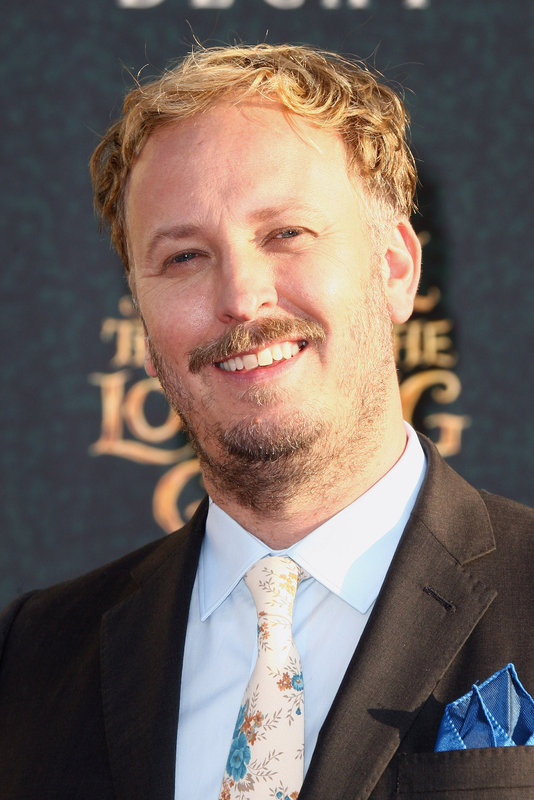
James Bobin received an Emmy and a DGA Award nomination for his direction of the first episode of the series.

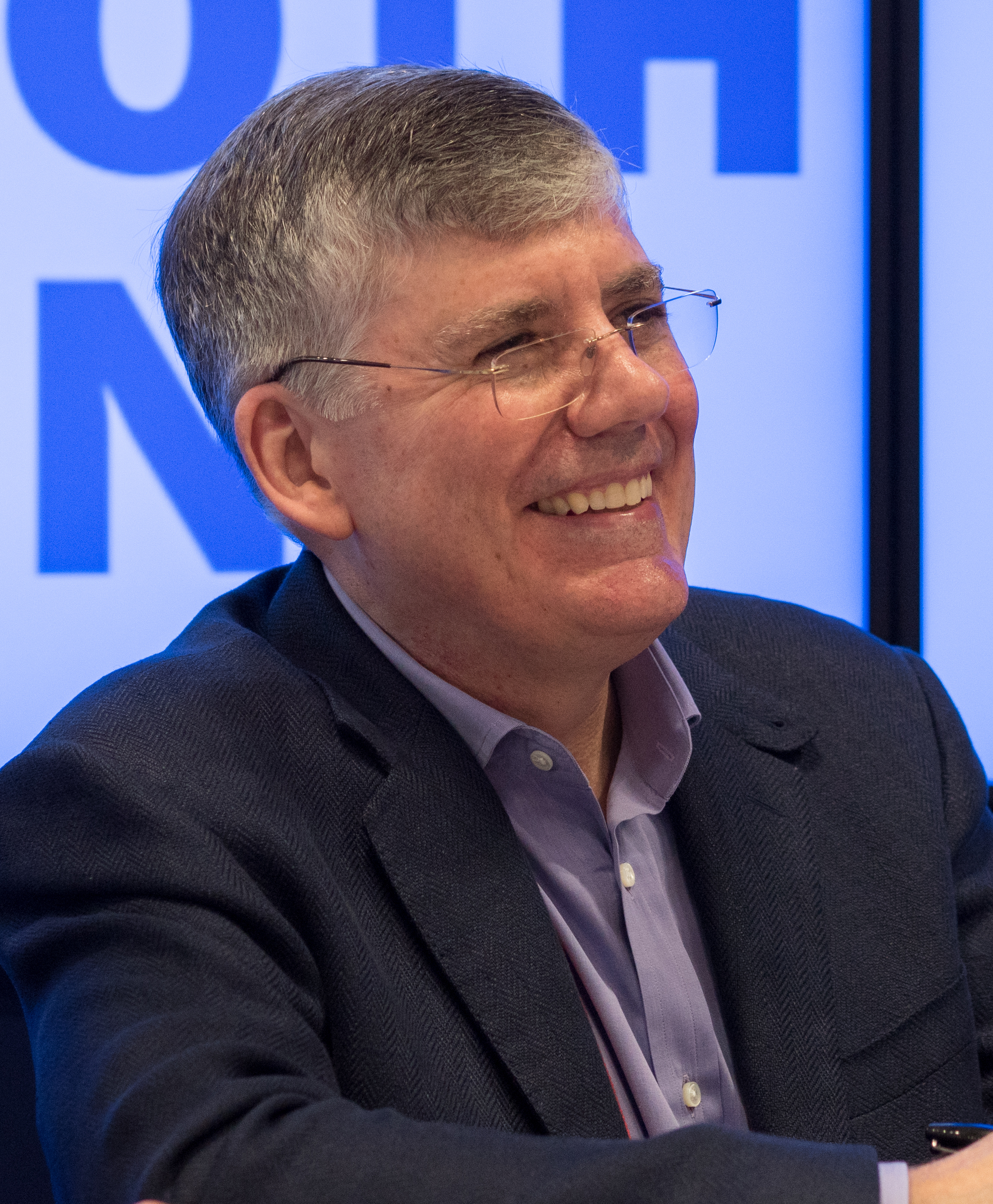
Rick Riordan (the author of the original book series) received recognition for his work as a writer and producer.

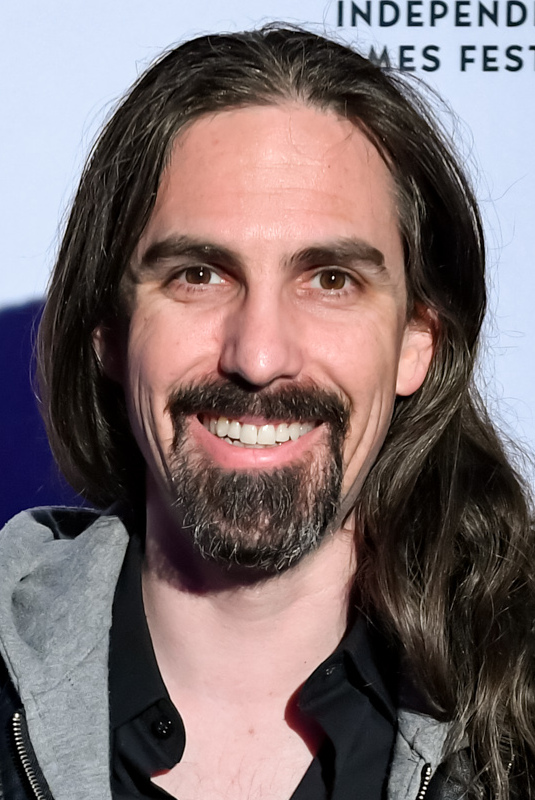
Composer Bear McCreary won two Emmys for his work.

=== Directors Guild of America Awards ===
Directors Guild of America Awards and nominations received by Percy Jackson and the Olympians
Year	Category	Nominee(s)	Result	Ref.
2024	Outstanding Directing – Children's Programs	James Bobin (for "I Accidentally Vaporize My Pre-Algebra Teacher")	Nominated	

=== Children's and Family Emmy Awards ===
Children's and Family Emmy Awards and nominations received by Percy Jackson and the Olympians
Year	Category	Nominee(s)	Result	Ref.
2025	Outstanding Young Teen Series	Percy Jackson and the Olympians (Note: Nominees: Jeremy Bell, James Bobin, Anders Engstrom, DJ Goldberg, Ellen Goldsmith-Vein, Monica Owusu-Breen, Becky Riordan, Rick Riordan, Jim Rowe, Bert Salke, Dan Shotz, Craig Silverstein, Jonathan E. Steinberg, and Jet Wilkinson (executive producers); Shernold Edwards, Andrew Miller, and Joe Tracz (co-executive producers); John Catron (producer); Zoë Neary (associate producer).)	Won	
2025	Outstanding Supporting Performer in a Preschool, Children's or Young Teen Program	Adam Copeland	Nominated	
2025	Outstanding Supporting Performer in a Preschool, Children's or Young Teen Program	Lance Reddick	Nominated	
2025	Outstanding Younger Performer in a Preschool, Children's or Young Teen Program	Leah Sava Jeffries	Nominated	
2025	Outstanding Writing for a Young Teen Program	Rick Riordan and Jonathan E. Steinberg (for "I Accidentally Vaporize My Pre-Algebra Teacher")	Won	
2025	Outstanding Directing for a Single Camera Program	James Bobin (for "I Accidentally Vaporize My Pre-Algebra Teacher")	Won (Note: Tied with Alex Ranken for A Real Bug's Life)	
2025	Outstanding Music Direction and Composition for a Live Action Program	Bear McCreary (Note: Additional nominees: Omer Ben-Zvi, Brian Claeys, Alexandre Côté, Bailey Gordon, Jesse Hartov, and Kelsey Woods (composers).)	Won	
2025	Outstanding Show Open	Percy Jackson and the Olympians (Note: Nominees: Christian Arnsparger, Alex Rupert, Jeffrey Su, and Michael Wang (animators); Jorge Artola (lead illustrator); Henry Chang (art director/animator); Lexi Gunvaldson (editor); Merrill Hall (designer/animator); Bear McCreary (themes by); Brandon Savoy (designer); Karin Fong and Tosh Kodama (creative directors); Ruthy Kim and Ella Lee (illustrators).)	Won	
2025	Outstanding Cinematography for a Live Action Single-Camera Program	Pierre Gill and Jules O'Loughlin	Nominated	
2025	Outstanding Editing for a Live Action Single-Camera Program	Colleen Rafferty, Stewart Schill, and Curtis Thurber	Won	
2025	Outstanding Sound Mixing and Sound Editing for a Live Action Program	Percy Jackson and the Olympians (Note: Nominees: Benjamin L. Cook (re-recording mixer/sound designer); Mike McKone (SFX editor); Kelly Zombor (production mixer); Keith Rogers (re-recording mixer); Jon Wakeham (supervising sound editor); Michael Baber (music editor); Brandyn Marko (sound editor); Tim Tuchrello (dialogue editor); Shaughnessy Hare (sound effects editor); Matt Lapthome (foley editor); Sam Rogers (foley artist); Ryan Squires (foley mixer).)	Nominated	
2025	Outstanding Visual Effects for a Live Action Program	Percy Jackson and the Olympians (Note: Nominees: Yasmin Blake, Jason Neisewander and Emma Orner (visual effects coordinators); Derrek Brajkovich-Horn (visual effects senior coordinator); Sonia Contreras (virtual production supervisor); Jacinthe Côté (visual effects head of production); Yanick Dusseault (executive visual effects art director); Erik Henry (senior VFX supervisor); Adele Jones-Venables (executive visual effects producer); Benoit Moranne (animation supervisor); Donny Rausch (associate VFX supervisor); Mathieu Raynault (executive visual effects supervisor); Matt Robken (senior VFX producer); Anthony Safariik (visual effects editor); Rick Sander (visual effects on set supervisor); Daniel Schmid (associate visual effects supervisor); Philippe Théroux (CG supervisor); Justin Bunt, Jose Burgos, Roman Schmidt, and Jeff White (VFX supervisors); Katherine Chambers (VFX producer); Joel Whist (SFX supervisor); Luca Bonatti, Simon Marinof, Espen Nordahl, and Sylvain Théroux (visual effects supervisors); Mélanie Carignan, Valérie Clément, Stacey MacDonald, Richard Martin, and Jessica-Rose Smith (visual effects producers); Amanda Newby Fitzgerald and Shawn Smolensky (associate visual effects producers).)	Won	
2025	Outstanding Casting for a Live Action Program	Candice Elzinga, Denise Chamian, and Jordana Sapiurka	Won	
2025	Outstanding Art Direction/Set Decoration/Scenic Design for a Single Camera Program	Percy Jackson and the Olympians (Note: Nominees: Chris Beach, Chad Chilibeck, Raymond Garrioch, Craig Humphries, Benoit Waller, and Harrison Yurkiw (art directors); Dan Hennah (production designer); Hamish Purdy (set decorator).)	Nominated	
2025	Outstanding Hairstyling and Makeup	Percy Jackson and the Olympians (Note: Nominees: Michael Fields and Ashley Forshaw (SFX makeup); Jessica Glyn-Jones and Amanda Mitchell (key hairstylists); Heather McLellan, Alysha McLoughlin, and Sam Smith (hairstylists); Megan Harkness and Krista Seller (key makeup artists); Ciara Allen, Sarah Keen, Jonah Levy, Madison Mah, and Jessica Ratsoy (makeup artists); Naomi Bakstad (makeup department head); Jeannie Chow (hair department head).)	Nominated	
2025	Outstanding Stunt Coordination for a Live Action Program	Eli Zagoudakis	Nominated	

=== Producers Guild of America Awards ===
Producers Guild of America Awards and nominations received by Percy Jackson and the Olympians
Year	Category	Nominee(s)	Result	Ref.
2025	Outstanding Children's Program	Percy Jackson and the Olympians	Nominated	

=== Writers Guild of America Awards ===
Writers Guild of America Awards and nominations received by Percy Jackson and the Olympians
Year	Category	Nominee(s)	Result	Ref.
2024	Children's Episodic, Long Form and Specials	Rick Riordan and Jonathan E. Steinberg (for "I Accidentally Vaporize My Pre-Algebra Teacher")	Nominated	
2025	Children's Episodic, Long Form and Specials	Rick Riordan and Jonathan E. Steinberg (for "A God Buys Us Cheeseburgers")	Nominated	
2026	Children's Episodic, Long Form and Specials	Rick Riordan and Craig Silverstein (for "I Play Dodgeball with Cannibals")	Nominated	

== Miscellaneous awards ==
Miscellaneous awards and nominations received by Percy Jackson and the Olympians
Award	Year (Note: Indicates the year of ceremony. Each year is linked to the article about the awards held that year, wherever possible.)	Category	Nominee(s)	Result	Ref.
Artios Awards	2025	Live Action Children & Family Series	Denise Chamian, Jordana Sapiurka, and Candice Elzinga (Note: Location Casting Director)	Nominated	
Astra TV Awards	2024	Best Children or Family Series	Percy Jackson and the Olympians	Nominated	
BET Awards	2024	BET YoungStars Award	Leah Sava Jeffries	Nominated	
Canadian Society of Cinematographers Awards	2024	Best Cinematography in Non-Theatrical Feature/Anthology Episode/Pilot	Pierre Gill (for "I Accidentally Vaporize My Pre-Algebra Teacher")	Nominated	
Family Film and TV Awards	2024 (Note: January 2024)	Best Ensemble Series (Television)	Percy Jackson and the Olympians	Nominated	
Family Film and TV Awards	2024 (Note: November 2024)	Best Ensemble Television Series	Percy Jackson and the Olympians	Nominated	
Family Film and TV Awards	2024	Outstanding Actors in a TV Series	Walker Scobell	Nominated	
Golden Trailer Awards	2024	Best Animation/Family (Trailer/Teaser/TV Spot) for a TV/Streaming Series	"Quest Teaser Trailer"	Won	
Golden Trailer Awards	2024	Best BTS/EPK for a TV/Streaming Series (Under 2 minutes)	"Finding Percy Jackson Featurette"	Nominated	
Golden Trailer Awards	2024	Best Billboard (for Feature Film or TV/Streaming Series)	"Percy Jackson and the Olympians Billboard"	Nominated	
Golden Trailer Awards	2024	Best WildPosts for a TV/Streaming Series	"Print Campaign"	Nominated	
Golden Trailer Awards	2025	Best Voice Over (Trailer/Teaser) for a TV/Streaming Series	"Start of Production: Chariot Tease"	Nominated	
Golden Trailer Awards	2026	Best Animation/Family TV Spot – TV/Streaming Series	"Monsters"	Nominated	
Golden Trailer Awards	2026	Most Innovative Advertising for a TV/Streaming Series	"Experiential Water Billboard"	Nominated	
Golden Trailer Awards	2026	Best Billboard (for Feature Film or TV/Streaming Series)	"Experiential Water Billboard"	Won	
Hollywood Music in Media Awards	2023	Main Title Theme – TV Show/Limited Series	Bear McCreary	Nominated	
Kidscreen Awards	2025	Best New Series – Teens/Tweens	Percy Jackson and the Olympians	Won	
Kidscreen Awards	2025	Best Live-Action Series – Teens/Tweens	Percy Jackson and the Olympians	Nominated	
Kidscreen Awards	2027	Best Live-Action or Best Mixed Media Series – Teens/Tweens	Percy Jackson and the Olympians	Pending	
Leo Awards	2024	Best Make-Up Dramatic Series	Naomi Bakstad, Megan Harkness, Krista Seller, and Mike Fields (for "We Find Out the Truth, Sort Of")	Nominated	
Leo Awards	2024	Best Stunt Coordination Motion Picture or Dramatic Series	Eli Zagoudakis (for "I Plunge to My Death")	Nominated	
Leo Awards	2026	Best Make-Up Dramatic Series	Naomi Bakstad, Megan Harkness, Krista Seller, Ciara Allen, and Ashley Forshaw (for "Nobody Gets the Fleece")	Won	
Leo Awards	2026	Best Hairstyling Dramatic Series	Jeannie Chow, Amanda Dawn Mitchell, Jessica Glyn-Jones, Jindje Renz, and Alysha McLoughlin (for "I Play Dodgeball with Cannibals")	Won	
Make-Up Artists & Hair Stylists Guild Awards	2025	Best Makeup in Children and Teen Programming	Naomi Bakstad, Megan Harkness, Krista Seller, Jonah Levy, and Mike Fields	Nominated	
Make-Up Artists & Hair Stylists Guild Awards	2025	Best Hair Styling in Children and Teen Programming	Jeannie Chow, Jessica Glyn-Jones, Amanda Dawn Mitchell, Heather McLellan, and Sam Wyatt	Nominated	
Make-Up Artists & Hair Stylists Guild Awards	2026	Best Makeup in Children and Teen Programming	Naomi Bakstad, Krista Seller, Ashley Forshaw, and Megan Harkness	Nominated	
Make-Up Artists & Hair Stylists Guild Awards	2026	Best Hair Styling in Children and Teen Programming	Jeannie Chow, Jessica Glyn-Jones, Amanda Dawn Mitchell, Jindje Renz, and Alysha McLoughlin	Nominated	
NAACP Image Awards	2024	Outstanding Performance by a Youth (Series, Special, Television Movie or Limited-Series)	Leah Sava Jeffries	Won	
NAACP Image Awards	2025	Outstanding Performance by a Youth (Series, Special, Television Movie or Limited-Series)	Leah Sava Jeffries	Won	
NAACP Image Awards	2026	Outstanding Performance by a Youth (Series, Special, Television Movie or Limited-Series)	Leah Sava Jeffries	Won	
NAACP Image Awards	2026	Outstanding Children's Program	Percy Jackson and the Olympians	Nominated	
NAMIC Next Vision Awards	2026	Children's Programming	Percy Jackson and the Olympians	Nominated	
Nickelodeon Kids' Choice Awards	2024	Favorite Kids TV Show	Percy Jackson and the Olympians	Won	
Nickelodeon Kids' Choice Awards	2024	Favorite Male TV Star (Kids)	Walker Scobell	Won	
Nickelodeon Kids' Choice Awards	2026	Favorite Kids TV Show	Percy Jackson and the Olympians	Won	
Nickelodeon Kids' Choice Awards	2026	Favorite Male TV Star (Kids)	Walker Scobell	Nominated	
Nickelodeon Kids' Choice Awards	2026	Favorite Male TV Star (Kids)	Aryan Simhadri	Nominated	
Nickelodeon Kids' Choice Awards	2026	Favorite Female TV Star (Kids)	Leah Sava Jeffries	Nominated	
Nickelodeon Kids' Choice Awards	2026	Favorite Podcast	Percy Jackson and the Olympians Official Podcast	Nominated	
Rockie Awards	2025	Live Action: Youth	Percy Jackson and the Olympians	Nominated	
Rockie Awards	2026	Live Action: Youth	Percy Jackson and the Olympians	Nominated	
Saturn Awards	2025	Best Fantasy Television Series	Percy Jackson and the Olympians	Nominated	
SCAD TVfest	2025	Rising Star Award	Walker Scobell	Won	
Shorty Awards	2024	Television	Percy Jackson and the Olympians Social Campaign	Audience Honor	
Shorty Awards	2024	Multi-Platform Presence	Percy Jackson and the Olympians Social Campaign	Audience Honor	
Shorty Awards	2024	Paid & Amplification	Percy Jackson and the Olympians Main Quest Story Selector	Silver	
Shorty Awards	2026	Featurette or Behind the Scenes Video	Percy Jackson and the Olympians S2 The Wedding Dress Mockumentary	Audience Honor	
TCA Awards	2024	Outstanding Achievement in Family Programming	Percy Jackson and the Olympians	Nominated	
TCA Awards	2026	Outstanding Achievement in Family Programming	Percy Jackson and the Olympians	Won	
