= Aryan Simhadri =

American actor (born 2006)

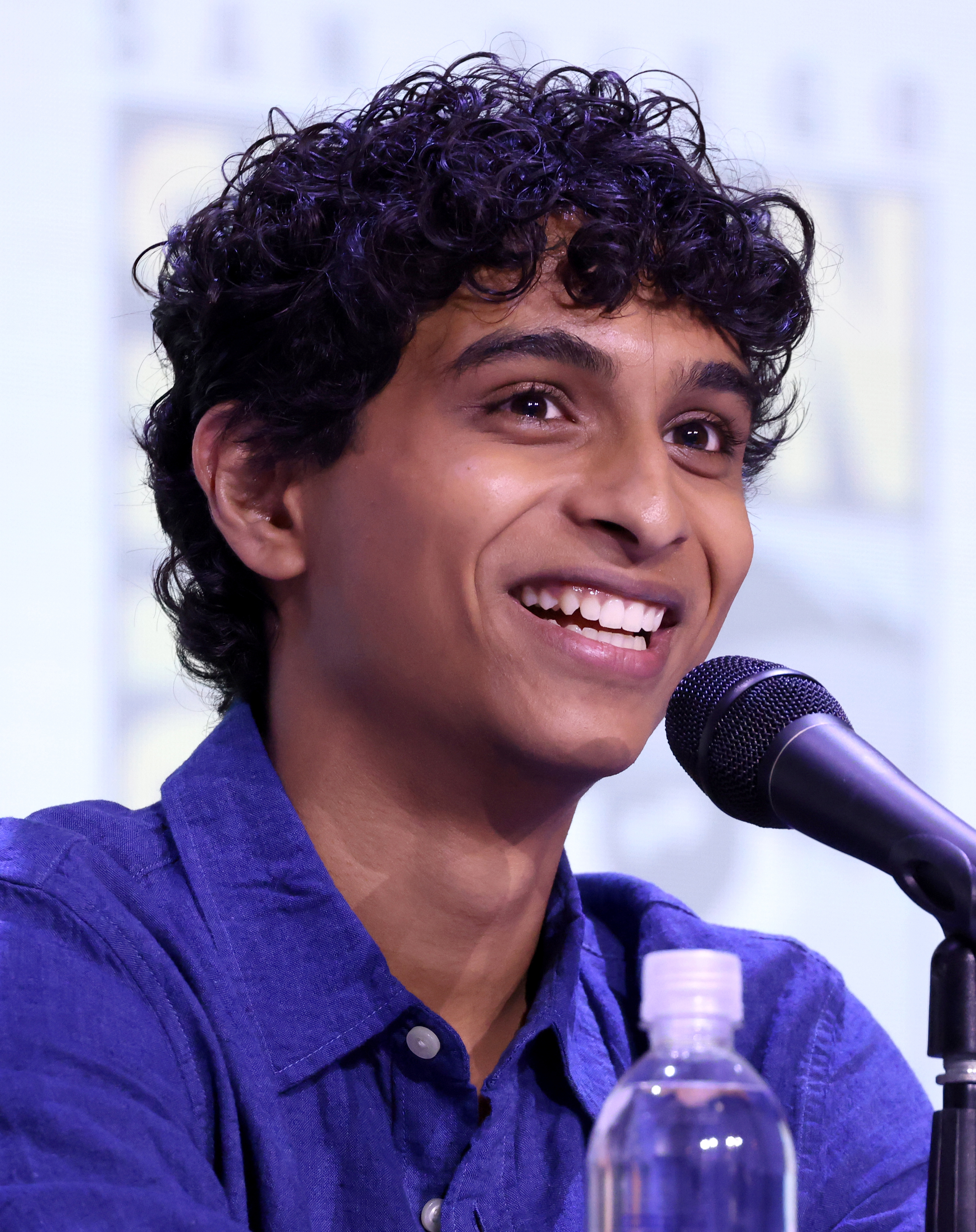
- Simhadri in 2025
- Born: May 6, 2006 (age 20); Ventura, California, U.S.
- Citizenship: United States
- Occupation: Actor
- Years active: 2013–present
- Known for: Grover Underwood in Percy Jackson & the Olympians

Aryan Simhadri (/ˌɑːriən sɪmhɑːdri/; born May 6, 2006) is an American actor best known for his role as Grover Underwood in the Disney+ series Percy Jackson and the Olympians. He has since played Walter in the off-Broadway production of Trevor: The Musical.

== Early life ==
Aryan Simhadri was born in an Indian Telugu family in Ventura, California. His parents migrated from Telangana, India to the United States.

== Career ==
Following short appearances in the comedy series Just Roll with It (2019) and the children's animated series Mira, Royal Detective (2020), Simhadri made his feature film debut with a supporting role in Netflix's The Main Event in 2020. His first starring role came in the Avantika Vandanapu-led Spin (2021) alongside Meera Syal and Abhay Deol. Simhadri followed this with a supporting role in Disney+'s Cheaper by the Dozen in 2022.

In 2023, Simhadri made a major breakthrough in his career with the Disney+ series, Percy Jackson and the Olympians, alongside Walker Scobell and Leah Jeffries. Adapted from the novel of the same name, he played Grover Underwood, Jackson's satyr guardian. Writing for IndieWire, Proma Khosla described Simhadri as "sweet and amusing" and noted that his portrayal of a significantly older character "added another layer of entertainment" to his performance.

== Filmography ==
=== Film ===
Year	Film	Role	Notes	Ref.
2020	The Main Event	Riyaz		
2020	The SpongeBob Movie: Sponge on the Run	Additional voices		
2021	Spin	Rohan Kumar		
2021	Wild Help	Cookie / Yeti Baby	Short film	
2022	Cheaper by the Dozen	Haresh Baker		
2022	Trevor: The Musical	Walter	Filmed a live performance	
2025	Freakier Friday	Jai		

=== Television ===
Year	Series	Role	Notes	Ref.
2013	How to Live with Your Parents (for the Rest of Your Life)	Boy	Episode: "How to Get Off the Couch"	
2016	Angie Tribeca	Kid with a Bulhorn	Episode: "Commissioner Bigfish"	
2016	Gamer's Guide to Pretty Much Everything	Henry	Episode: "The Ghost"	
2016–2018	Clarence	Jimmy Chakravorthy	Voice role; 2 episodes	
2017–2018	Teachers	Danny	2 episodes	
2018	SEAL Team	Kid	Episode: "Takedown"	
2018	Fancy Nancy	Kabir	Episode: "Grow Up, Jo Jo! / Nancy's Supreme Night Out"	
2019	The Unicorn	Orrin	Episode: "No Small Parts"	
2019	Sunnyside	Young Garrett	Episode: "Too Many Lumpies"	
2019–2020	Just Roll with It	Norvin Schnuckle	5 episodes	
2020	Will & Grace	Farhan	Episode: "Lies & Whispers"	
2020	Mira, Royal Detective	Dhruv Sharma	Voice role; 9 episodes	
2021	Adventure Time: Distant Lands	Tiffany	Voice role; Episode: "Together Again"	
2022	The Casagrandes	Sameer	Voice role; Episode: "The Wurst Job / The Sound of Meddle"	
2023	Dew Drop Diaries	Reed	4 episodes	
2023–present	Percy Jackson and the Olympians	Grover Underwood	Main role	
2026	Malcolm in the Middle: Life's Still Unfair	Manjushri	1 episode	

=== Theater ===
Year	Title	Role	Director	Venue	Notes	Ref.
2021	Trevor: The Musical	Walter	Marc Bruni	Stage 42		

== Awards and nominations ==
Year	Award	Category	Project	Result	Ref.
2021	Young Artist Academy	Best Performance in a Streaming Film - Teen Actor	The Main Event	Won	
2023	Young Artist Academy	Best Performance in a Streaming Film - Leading Teen Artist	Cheaper by the Dozen	Nominated	
2023	Young Artist Academy	Best Performance in a Streaming Film - Supporting Teen Artist	Trevor: The Musical	Nominated	
