= Caitlin Reilly =

American actress and comedian (born 1989)

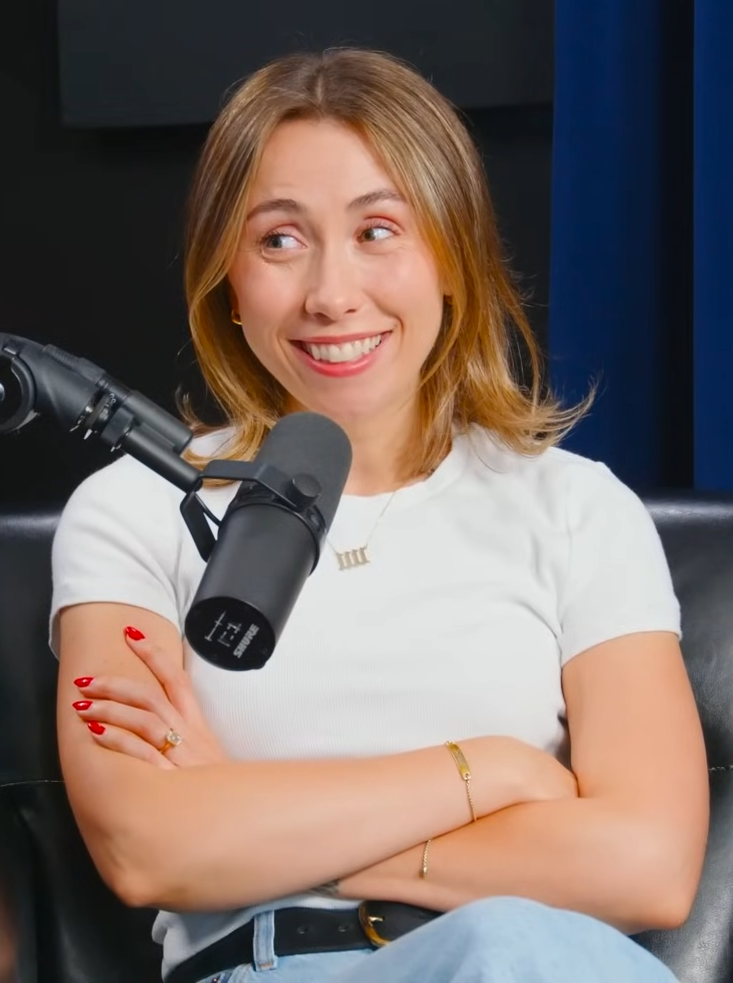
- Reilly in 2025
- Born: September 12, 1989 (age 37); Los Angeles, California, U.S.
- Education: American Academy of Dramatic Arts
- Occupations: Actress; comedian
- Years active: 2006–present
- Spouse: Evan Eggers (m. 2025)
- Parent: John Reilly (father)

TikTok information
- Page: Caitlin Reilly
- Followers: 2.3 million
- Last updated: August 19, 2024

Caitlin Reilly (born September 12, 1989) is an American actress and comedian. She became known for social media videos in which she does impressions of dislikeable archetypes. She has appeared on TV shows such as Hacks, Loot, Dead Boy Detectives, In the Know and I Love LA.

== Early life and education ==
Reilly grew up in the Los Angeles neighborhood of Hancock Park. Her father, John Reilly, was a longtime soap opera actor best known as Sean Donely on General Hospital; her mother, Liz (née Lily-Beth Janred), was a Swedish model-turned-businesswoman who died in July 2025; and she has four sisters. Her family runs a children's clothing store in Larchmont. After her father died in 2021, Reilly appeared on General Hospital in his tribute as his character's daughter, Annie (previously played by Courtney Halverson).

When she was ten, Reilly wanted to leave school to become a child actor, but her parents refused. She attended Immaculate Heart High School in Los Feliz, where she acted in school plays. She studied acting at the American Academy of Dramatic Arts, graduating in 2010.

== Career ==
After graduating from acting school, Reilly spent many years struggling to get acting work and found other employment at a nanny agency and as a waitress. She appeared in several short films in 2014 and 2015, including Love and Paint, Downstairs, and Die! Sitter! Die!: Rupert. In 2020, she took a break from acting, becoming the personal assistant to a real estate agent, but soon left the job when the COVID-19 pandemic began.

Stuck at home during the pandemic, Reilly started a TikTok account and began making short comedy videos in which she parodies a range of disagreeable types of people. Her videos went viral, with early hits including "WASP Mom" and "The Coworker You Hate on Zoom", and earned her more than one million TikTok followers before the end of the year. She drew inspiration from observations of life in Los Angeles and other personae on social media. PopSugar credited the power of Reilly's impressions to her "rotating blend of cringe-worthy facial expressions, spot-on vocal inflections, and impeccable comedic timing". She had more than two million TikTok followers by the end of the following year.

Because of her TikTok success, Reilly was signed by WME and got cast by series co-creator Lucia Aniello on the HBO comedy series Hacks, playing network executive Jessica on the second season in 2022. She then had other supporting roles, including on High School Musical: The Musical: The Series, the Apple TV+ show Loot, and the Darren Aronofsky-produced film Little Death. She became a contestant on the Dropout improv show Make Some Noise beginning in 2022.

Reilly played a recurring role as one of the dandelion sprites on the Netflix show Dead Boy Detectives, released in 2024. The same year, she voiced one of the main characters on the Peacock stop-motion series In the Know, her first voiceover role. In 2025, she hosted Netflix's podcast for the second season of Wednesday.

== Personal life ==
Reilly and graphic and motion designer Evan Eggers married on September 20, 2025 in an intimate ceremony at their Los Angeles home.

== Filmography ==
=== Film ===
Year	Title	Role	Notes	Ref.
2020	Let's Unpack That	Caitlin	Short film	
2020	Push Harder	Kelly	Short film	
2021	The Cricket Brigade		Short film	
2021	Cafe Americano	Mom		
2022	Wrong Reasons	NIN Prime Time Anchor		
2023	Two Chairs, Not One	The Customer	Short film	
2023	Cora Bora	Flight Attendant		
2024	Little Death	Suzanne		
2024	RAT!	Margaux	Short film	

=== Television ===
Year	Title	Role	Notes	Ref.
2021	General Hospital	Annie Donely	Episode: "#1.14793"	
2022	Hacks	Jessica	2 episodes	
2022	Loot	Jacinda	2 episodes	
2022–2025	Make Some Noise	Self	5 episodes	
2023	High School Musical: The Musical: The Series	Quinn Robbins	6 episodes	
2024	In the Know	Fabian	Voice role; 6 episodes	
2024	Dead Boy Detectives	Litty	4 episodes	
2024–2025	After Midnight	Self	4 episodes	
2025	It's Always Sunny in Philadelphia	Sofia	Episode: "Mac and Dennis Become EMTs"	
2025	I Love LA	Naomi	Episode: "Upstairses"	
2026	Very Important People	Stop	Episode: "Stop"	
2026	Do You Want Kids?	Michelle	Main Cast	

=== Video games ===
- Pony Island 2: Panda Circus (2027)
