= In the Know =

American adult television series

- Genre: Animation; Comedy
- Created by: Zach Woods; Brandon Gardner; Mike Judge
- Directed by: Brandon Gardner; Zach Woods
- Voices of: Zach Woods; Caitlin Reilly; Carl Tart; J. Smith-Cameron; Charlie Bushnell; Mike Judge
- Composer: Eldad Guetta
- No. of seasons: 1
- No. of episodes: 6

Production
- Executive producers: Brandon Gardner; Zach Woods; Mike Judge; Greg Daniels; Dustin Davis; Alex Bulkley; Corey Campodonico
- Producers: Melanie Coombs; Jen Chuck
- Editors: Hamilton Barrett; Kelly Lyon
- Running time: 21–26 minutes
- Production companies: Oregon Film; ShadowMachine; Bandera Entertainment; Universal Television

Original release
- Network: Peacock
- Release: January 25, 2024

In the Know is an American adult stop-motion political satire television series developed by Zach Woods, Mike Judge and Brandon Gardner, and stars the voices of Woods, Judge, Caitlin Reilly, Carl Tart, J. Smith-Cameron, and Charlie Bushnell. The series is centered around the staff of an NPR program. It was released onto Peacock on January 25, 2024, and is notable for being the service's first original adult animated and stop-motion series. On December 31, 2024, it was announced that the series was canceled after one season.

== Cast ==
- Zach Woods as Lauren Caspian
- Caitlin Reilly as Fabian
- Carl Tart as Carl
- J. Smith-Cameron as Barb
- Charlie Bushnell as Chase
- Mike Judge as Sandy

=== Interviewees ===
- Jonathan Van Ness
- Kaia Gerber
- Ken Burns
- Finn Wolfhard
- Norah Jones
- Tegan and Sara
- Nicole Byer
- Roxane Gay
- Mike Tyson
- Jorge Masvidal
- Hugh Laurie

== Episodes ==
No.	Title	Directed by	Written by	Original release date
1	"I'm No Hero"	Brandon Gardner and Zach Woods	Zach Woods and Brandon Gardner	January 25, 2024
Lauren allows a homeless man to use the station's bathroom, and he occupies it the entire day. Interviews include Kaia Gerber discussing how she learned to walk for modelling and Jonathan Van Ness disputing the title "the Malcolm X of the gay community".
2	"Whose House?"	Brandon Gardner and Zach Woods	Billy Domineau and Collier Meyerson	January 25, 2024
It's pledge week, and Lauren meets Gene, the station's biggest donor. Meanwhile, Fabian finds her temporary job "boring", and Sandy shows interest in the donor station. Interviews: Ken Burns, Finn Wolfhard, Norah Jones
3	"Very Gross"	Brandon Gardner and Zach Woods	Emmy Blotnick and Emman Sadorra	January 25, 2024
Despite his nauseous listeners, Lauren finally gets to interview his dream guests Tegan and Sara, and Fabian dedicates herself to a new cause. Interviews: Tegan and Sara, Nicole Byer
4	"Portrait of a Safety Rep on Fire"	Brandon Gardner and Zach Woods	Brandon Gardner	January 25, 2024
Lauren is no long allowed to donate to the sperm bank, Fabian and Carl compete to be temporary safety rep, and Barb searches for the perfect chair. Interviews: Roxane Gay, Mike Tyson.
5	"Yogurt Week"	Brandon Gardner and Zach Woods	Jen Chuck and Ronnie Adrian	January 25, 2024
Lauren calls for a racial reckoning, Sandy receives a transplant, and Fabian conducts a pre-interview with Jorge Masvidal.
6	"Thinksgiving"	Brandon Gardner and Zach Woods	Zach Woods and Brandon Gardner	January 25, 2024
Lauren's son visits for Thanksgiving, the staff gathers at the station to watch the Macy's Thanksgiving Day Parade, and Lauren gets an impromptu interview with Hugh Laurie. Fabian has to choose between her career and her family.

== Reception ==
On the review aggregator website Rotten Tomatoes, 77% of thirteen critics' reviews are positive. Metacritic, which uses a weighted average, assigned the first season a score of 69 out of 100, based on seven critics.

Melissa Camacho of Common Sense Media gave the series a 4 out of 5.

For the 76th Primetime Creative Arts Emmy Awards lead animator Jan Maas won an Outstanding Individual Achievement in Animation.
