= Percy Jackson and the Olympians (TV series) =

2023 American fantasy television series

- Genre: Comedy-drama; Fantasy adventure
- Created by: Rick Riordan; Jonathan E. Steinberg
- Based on: Percy Jackson & the Olympians by Rick Riordan
- Showrunners: Jonathan E. Steinberg; Dan Shotz; Craig Silverstein
- Starring: Walker Scobell; Leah Sava Jeffries; Aryan Simhadri; Charlie Bushnell; Dior Goodjohn; Daniel Diemer; Tamara Smart; Levi Chrisopulos
- Theme music composer: Bear McCreary
- Composers: Sparks & Shadows; Bear McCreary; Dayna Ambrosio
- Country of origin: United States
- Original language: English
- No. of seasons: 3
- No. of episodes: 18

Production
- Executive producers: Jonathan E. Steinberg; Dan Shotz; Rick Riordan; Rebecca Riordan; Ellen Goldsmith-Vein; Jeremy Bell; D. J. Goldberg; Bert Salke; James Bobin; Jim Rowe; Monica Owusu-Breen; Anders Engström; Jet Wilkinson; Craig Silverstein; Albert Kim; Sarah Watson; Jason Ensler; Tamara Becher-Wilkinson
- Production location: Vancouver, British Columbia
- Cinematography: Pierre Gill; Jules O'Loughlin; François Dagenais; Stephen Maier
- Editors: Stewart Schill; Colleen Rafferty; Curtis Thurber; Nicholas Emme; Brian Cerrillo
- Running time: 32–47 minutes
- Production companies: Co-Lab21; The Gotham Group; Mythomagic; Quaker Moving Pictures; 20th Television

Original release
- Network: Disney+
- Release: December 19, 2023 – present
- Network: Hulu
- Release: December 10, 2025 (Note: The first episode of the series was released simultaneously Disney+ and Hulu on December 19, 2023.) – present

Percy Jackson and the Olympians is an American fantasy adventure television series created by Rick Riordan and Jonathan E. Steinberg for streaming service Disney+, based on the book series of the same name by Riordan. Walker Scobell stars as the titular character, alongside Leah Sava Jeffries as Annabeth Chase and Aryan Simhadri as Grover Underwood.

Development on the series began in May 2020, following a pitch by Riordan to Disney Branded Television. Jonathan E. Steinberg and Dan Shotz were announced as showrunners in July 2021, with James Bobin hired to direct the first episode in October. Scobell was cast in the lead role in January 2022, with Jeffries and Simhadri joining the cast in May. Filming takes place in Vancouver, British Columbia.

The first season of Percy Jackson and the Olympians, based on the first book, The Lightning Thief, ran from December 19, 2023, to January 30, 2024. The second season, based on The Sea of Monsters, ran from December 10, 2025, to January 21, 2026, with episodes also releasing on Hulu from this season onwards. The third season, based on The Titan's Curse, premiered on November 20, 2026 and is expected to conclude on December 11.

The series has received positive reviews from critics, with praise towards its worldbuilding, faithfulness to the source material, and performances (particularly those of the leading trio and Charlie Bushnell). It has received multiple accolades, including eight of the sixteen Children's and Family Emmy Awards for which it was nominated, and Outstanding Young Teen Series and awards for writing and directing.

== Premise ==
In the first season, twelve-year-old demigod Percy Jackson is accused by the Greek god Zeus of stealing his thunderbolt and races to find it and restore order to Olympus.

In the second season, Percy returns to Camp Half-Blood a year later, where he learns that it is under threat from the forces of Kronos and Grover has gone missing, and must venture into the Sea of Monsters to find the Golden Fleece.

In the third season, when Annabeth disappears, Percy, Grover, and Thalia must join forces with the Hunters of Artemis to stop a looming threat to Olympus. Meanwhile, Percy struggles with the implications and consequences concerning the Great Prophecy, fearing he could be the demigod it foretells.

== Cast and characters ==
=== Main ===
- Walker Scobell as Percy Jackson, a young demigod and son of Poseidon
  - Azriel Dalman portrays a younger Percy (season 1)
- Leah Sava Jeffries as Annabeth Chase, a daughter of Athena who has been training at Camp Half-Blood for five years
  - Jeffries's cousin Marissa Lior Winans portrays a younger Annabeth (seasons 2–3)
- Aryan Simhadri as Grover Underwood, Percy's best friend, protector, and a satyr
- Charlie Bushnell as Luke Castellan (season 2–present; recurring season 1), a cunning son of Hermes and the counselor of the Hermes cabin who is later revealed to be working with Kronos
- Dior Goodjohn as Clarisse La Rue (season 2; recurring seasons 1 and 3), a strong-willed daughter of Ares who bullies Percy
- Daniel Diemer as Tyson (season 2), Percy's Cyclops half-brother
- Tamara Smart as Thalia Grace (season 3; recurring season 2), the powerful and rebellious daughter of Zeus who was turned into a tree by her father after sacrificing herself to save Annabeth, Luke, and Grover
- Levi Chrisopulos as Nico di Angelo (season 3), a son of Hades, who along with his older sister Bianca, spent several decades in the Lotus Hotel and Casino

=== Recurring ===
- Megan Mullally as Alecto / Mrs. Dodds (season 1), Percy's stern mathematics teacher who secretly serves the god Hades as one of the three Furies
- Virginia Kull as Sally Jackson, Percy's selfless mother
- Timm Sharp as Gabe Ugliano (season 1), Sally's husband and Percy's stepfather. Rick Riordan's wife and executive producer Rebecca Riordan stated that his abusive behavior, present in the book, was toned down for the show as its cruelty would be more "triggering and difficult to watch" on screen than on the page, and "this isn't supposed to be a horror show".
- Glynn Turman as Chiron / Mr. Brunner, a centaur and Activities Director of Camp Half-Blood. While the character mainly uses an enchanted wheelchair to disguise himself among humans, the character has a disability in the form of a brace in his left hind leg as a war injury. The creators made this change to address his disability, though they noted it would be "just a detail" during the first season.
- Nick Boraine as Kronos, (Note: Prior to being credited as Kronos, Boraine is credited as "Voice in Dream".) the King of the Titans who appears as a voice in Percy's dreams
- Jason Mantzoukas as Dionysus / Mr. D, the god of wine and curmudgeonly camp director of Camp Half-Blood. He is in this position as punishment from Zeus for chasing an off-limits nymph and has to substitute soda when he is also not allowed to have any wine.
- Adam Copeland as Ares (season 1; guest season 2), the arrogant and daring god of war
- Timothy Simons as King Tantalus (season 2), a spirit from the Fields of Punishment, a son of Zeus, and the interim Activities Director of Camp Half-Blood cursed with eternal hunger and thirst ever since he revealed the Olympians' secrets revolving around their nectar and ambrosia and cooked his son Pelops to serve as food to the Olympians
- Beatrice Kitsos as Alison Simms (season 2), a daughter of Apollo and graduate demigod from Camp Half-Blood who lives in the human world and sides with Kronos' army. She is an original character created for the series.
- Andrew Alvarez (season 1) and Kevin Chacon (season 2) as Chris Rodriguez, a son of Hermes and Luke's half-brother. Alvarez was recast as the rogue demigod Theo of Kronos' army in the second season.
- Holt McCallany as Atlas (season 3), a Titan punished by Zeus to hold up the skies following the Olympic-Titan war and who seeks vengeance leading Kronos' army
- David Costabile as Dr. Thorn (season 3), the stern Westover Hall military academy headmaster who is secretly a Manticore allied with Kronos and Atlas
- Dafne Keen as Artemis (season 3), the goddess of the moon, the wild animals, and the hunt
- Olive Abercrombie as Bianca di Angelo (season 3), a formerly lost daughter of Hades who along with her younger brother Nico spent several decades in the Lotus Hotel and Casino
- Saara Chaudry as Zoë Nightshade (season 3), a former Hesperid who became the lieutenant of the Hunters of Artemis
- Sophia Carriere as Phoebe (season 3), a squad leader of the Hunters of Artemis

=== Guest ===
- Olivea Morton as Nancy Bobofit (season 1), a blunt teacher's pet who relishes tormenting Percy
- Hiro Kanagawa as the headmaster of Yancy Academy (season 1). Kanagawa also portrays Kronos' headmaster form in a dream in "We Take a Zebra to Vegas".
- Simon Chin as Eddie (season 1), the building superintendent of the apartment building where the Jacksons reside
- Manoj Sood as Percy Jackson's second grade principal (season 1)
- Jason Gray-Stanford and Garfield Wilson respectively as Maron and Leneus (season 1), two members of the Council of Cloven Elders
- Kathleen Duborg as Helena (season 1), a dryad and maternal figure for Grover
- Threnody Tsai as Sarah, a wheelchair-using demigod and skilled archer
- Jessica Parker Kennedy as Medusa (season 1), a gorgon who lives in solitude and has a past with Percy's father
- Sara J. Southey as Tisiphone (season 1), a member of the Furies
- Jennifer Shirley (season 1) and Heather Feeney (seasons 2–3) as Pythia, the Oracle of Delphi whose mummified remains are in Camp Half-Blood
- Suzanne Cryer as Echidna (season 1), the menacing mother of monsters
- Joyce Robbins, La Nein Harrison, and Cindy Piper respectively as Atropos, Lachesis, and Clotho (season 1), the three Fates, goddesses of destiny
- Timothy Omundson as Hephaestus (season 1), the god of blacksmiths and forges who is strong, compassionate and merciful unlike the other gods
- Lin-Manuel Miranda (Note: Miranda is credited as a special guest star.) as Hermes, the messenger of the gods and the god of thieves and travelers who is charismatic and boisterous
- Ted Dykstra as Augustus (season 1), an older satyr and acquaintance of Grover
- Jelena Milinovic as Eudora (season 1), a Nereid who works for Poseidon
- Toby Stephens as Poseidon, Percy's father and god of the sea who is stubborn and impulsive
- Julian Richings as Procrustes (season 1), a son of Poseidon, Percy's half-brother, and a waterbed salesman who kills people by stretching them to the size of his beds. Richings previously portrayed Charon in the film Percy Jackson & the Olympians: The Lightning Thief (2010).
- Jay Duplass as Hades (season 1), the god of the Underworld who is a misunderstood genius and an outcast to his family
- Travis Woloshyn as Charon (season 1), the ferryman of the River Styx
- Lance Reddick (season 1) and Courtney B. Vance (Note: Vance is credited as a special guest star.) (season 2) as Zeus, the ferocious King of the Olympians whose thunderbolt was stolen in the first season
- Kristen Schaal, Margaret Cho, and Sandra Bernhard respectively as Tempest, Wasp, and Anger (season 2), the three Gray Sisters who operate an Olympian taxi service in the Greater New York City area
- Marlo Marolle as Mark, a son of Ares
- Mark Gibbon, Dan Payne, Daniel Cudmore, Paul Cheng and Kyle Strauts, respectively as Joe Bob, Marrow Sucker, Skull Eater, Brain Biter, and Spine Crusher (season 2), five Laestrygonians that are allied with Kronos. Cudmore previously portrayed a Manticore in scenes that were cut from Percy Jackson: Sea of Monsters (2013).
  - Gibbon also portrays Chet Jr. (season 2), a Laestrygonian
  - Cudmore also portrays Skull Crusher (season 2), a Laestrygonian that Luke gets into Camp Half-Blood, and an unnamed Laestrygonian hunter that Percy and Thalia fight (season 3)
- Sage Linder as Bronte (season 2), a daughter of Athena
- Aiden Howard as Aidan (season 2), a son of Aphrodite and member of Kronos' army
- Andra Day as Athena (season 2), Annabeth's mother and the goddess of wisdom
- Aleks Paunovic as Polyphemus (season 2), a Cyclops son of Poseidon and guardian of the Golden Fleece who was previously blinded by Odysseus. Paunovic previously portrayed an unnamed Cyclops in the film Percy Jackson: Sea of Monsters (2013) alongside Derek Mears.
- Rosemarie DeWitt as Circe / C.C. (season 2), a sorceress whom Percy and Annabeth encounter in the Sea of Monsters
- Jasmine Vega as Hylla Ramírez-Arellano (season 2), a concierge at Circe's spa
- Andrew Kavadas as Blackbeard (season 2), a historic pirate captain and son of Ares who was previously turned into a guinea pig by Circe
- Dayna Ambrosio as the uncredited voice of the Sirens (season 2), nymphs who draw heroes to their death with alluring music
- Viola Abley as Katie Yoon (season 2), a daughter of Apollo
- Adam Swain as Ellis Wakefield (season 2), a son of Ares
- Hubert Jerzyk Smielecki as Apollo (season 3), the god of the sun, music, poetry, archery, and prophecy, and Artemis's twin brother.
- Axel Hansen and Ben Cockell as Connor and Travis Stoll (season 3), brothers and sons of Hermes

Series author Rick Riordan makes cameo appearances in the first season as a teacher in the headmasters' office at Yancy Academy and as a statue at Aunty Em's Garden Gnome Emporium.

== Episodes ==
| Season | Episodes | Originally released | | |
| Season | Episodes | First released | Last released | Network |
|---|---|---|---|---|
| 1 | 8 | December 19, 2023 | January 30, 2024 | Disney+ |
| 2 | 8 | December 10, 2025 | January 21, 2026 | Disney+ / Hulu |
| 3 | 8 | November 20, 2026 | December 11, 2026 | Disney+ / Hulu |

=== Season 1 (2023–24) ===
The first season is based on the novel The Lightning Thief.

| No. overall | No. in season | Title | Directed by | Written by | Original release date |
|---|---|---|---|---|---|
| 1 | 1 | "I Accidentally Vaporize My Pre-Algebra Teacher" | James Bobin | Rick Riordan & Jonathan E. Steinberg | December 19, 2023 |
During a field trip to the Metropolitan Museum of Art, twelve-year-old Percy Jackson is given a ball-point pen by Mr. Brunner, his Latin teacher. Percy accidentally 'pushes' class bully Nancy Bobofit into a water fountain, seemingly without touching her. A teacher, Mrs. Dodds witnessing it, reveals herself as the Fury Alecto. Percy's pen transforms into a sword and he unintentionally strikes and vaporizes Alecto. Percy discovers that everyone else has seemingly forgotten Mrs. Dodds. Percy is expelled from school and returns home to his stepfather Gabe Ugliano and mother Sally Jackson. Percy and Sally head to their cabin in Montauk, New York, where Sally explains that Greek gods and monsters are real. Percy's classmate, Grover Underwood, inadvertently revealing himself as a satyr, arrives to tell Sally to move Percy to Camp Half-Blood. As the three drive to the camp, a Minotaur attacks and seemingly kills Sally. Percy kills the creature in anger while breaking off its horn. He collapses upon reaching the camp where Chiron, a centaur, greets him.
| 2 | 2 | "I Become Supreme Lord of the Bathroom" | James Bobin | Rick Riordan & Jonathan E. Steinberg | December 19, 2023 |
Percy awakens in the camp's infirmary. He meets Mr. D, the camp director, and learns that Mr. Brunner is actually Chiron. Percy is assigned to the Hermes cabin until his godly parent claims him. Percy meets several other campers, including Luke Castellan and Clarisse La Rue. Clarisse and several others attempt to dunk Percy's head in the toilet, but Percy unknowingly repels them with his water powers. Annabeth Chase recruits Percy onto her team for the capture-the-flag game. Luke tells Percy about how he and Thalia Grace had recruited Annabeth and set off for camp, but only he and Annabeth made it. Capture-the-flag begins, and Percy repels an attack by Clarisse and her teammates. After her team claims victory, Annabeth pushes Percy into the lake. The water immediately heals Percy's wounds. A trident appears over him showing he is claimed by Poseidon, surprising most campers. Soon after, Percy is told that Zeus has accused him of stealing his Master Bolt and that war will break out if it is not returned within a week. When Grover tells Percy that Sally is still alive, Percy decides to embark on the quest.
| 3 | 3 | "We Visit the Garden Gnome Emporium" | Anders Engström | Jonathan E. Steinberg & Monica Owusu-Breen | December 26, 2023 |
Percy receives a prophecy from the Oracle of Delphi, which appears to confirm that the Master Bolt is with Hades in the Underworld beneath Los Angeles. At Chiron's request, Percy chooses Annabeth and Grover to join the quest. Before leaving, Luke gives Percy winged tennis shoes. The three begin a cross-country bus trip. In New Jersey they are attacked by Alecto, who has reformed, and Tisiphone. They escape and travel through the forest on a satyr trail, eventually coming to Medusa's house. Medusa claims she is not actually a monster but a victim of the gods. She asks Percy to betray his friends in exchange for help in saving his mother. When Medusa uncovers her snake-covered head, intending to turn the trio into stone, they work together to decapitate her. Percy uses Medusa's head to petrify Alecto. After disagreements with Annabeth and Grover, Percy reveals the prophecy predicts a friend will betray him. The three then clarify themselves, and Percy decides to send Medusa's head to Mount Olympus.
| 4 | 4 | "I Plunge to My Death" | Anders Engström | Jonathan E. Steinberg & Joe Tracz | January 2, 2024 |
Percy, Annabeth, and Grover continue west by train. Annabeth recounts running away from home and Luke and Thalia finding her. The next day, the trio's cabin is destroyed by a woman who reveals herself as Echidna. She is training a young Chimera that poisons Percy. Arriving in St. Louis, the trio seek refuge inside the Gateway Arch, a monument to Athena. As Percy deteriorates from the poison, Annabeth takes him to the top of the Arch to seek Athena's help. Annabeth learns from Echidna's monster language that Athena was embarrassed when Medusa's head arrived on Mount Olympus and has allowed Echidna and the Chimera to enter the Arch. Percy stays behind after forcing Grover and Annabeth to escape. As he battles the Chimera, he falls from the Arch and plummets toward the ground. A waterspout formed by Poseidon pulls him into the Mississippi River. While struggling underwater, Percy encounters a Nereid who instructs him how to breathe in water.
| 5 | 5 | "A God Buys Us Cheeseburgers" | Jet Wilkinson | Rick Riordan & Jonathan E. Steinberg | January 9, 2024 |
Annabeth spots Atropos, one of the three Fates, cutting a thread, signifying an impeding death. She and Grover reunite with Percy, who says they must meet Poseidon in Santa Monica before learning they are wanted criminals due to the train and Arch incidents. The trio encounter Ares, who offers assistance if Percy and Annabeth recover his shield from Waterland. They find the shield inside a tunnel of love, but Percy has to become trapped on Hephaestus's golden throne for the shield to release. Annabeth convinces Hephaestus to free Percy. Afterwards, Hephaestus tells Annabeth that he will speak favorably to Athena. Ares provides the trio a backpack with supplies and takes them to a zoo delivery truck bound for Las Vegas where Hermes will assist them at the Lotus Casino. Grover tells Percy and Annabeth that he knows who stole the Master Bolt based on his conversation with Ares.
| 6 | 6 | "We Take a Zebra to Vegas" | Jet Wilkinson | Jonathan E. Steinberg & Joe Tracz | January 16, 2024 |
After Percy eavesdrops on a dream where a mysterious voice presenting as his headmaster from Yancy Academy talks to the lightning thief, the trio arrive in Las Vegas and inform Luke via Iris Message that Clarisse might be the thief. At the Lotus Hotel and Casino, Grover finds a family friend named Augustus who says that he found Pan. Percy and Annabeth find Hermes, who refuses to help them for various reasons. They realize they have unknowingly been inside the casino for days due to the air inside the casino containing lotus fruit. After reuniting with Grover, they find Hermes's car and the directions to the Underworld he left them. The car takes them to Santa Monica Beach. In the water, Percy learns from a Nereid that his quest's deadline had passed and his father left to prepare for war. Percy vows to continue his quest and is provided with four pearls to escape the Underworld.
| 7 | 7 | "We Find Out the Truth, Sort Of" | Anders Engström | Andrew Miller | January 23, 2024 |
In a flashback scene, Sally brings Percy to a new school. Overwhelmed due to Percy struggling with abandonment and beginning to see mythical creatures, Sally contacts Poseidon, who dissuades her from taking Percy to Camp Half-Blood so he can forge his own identity. In the present, Percy confronts Procrustes and gains access to his secret passage into the Underworld. The trio encounter Charon, who summons Cerberus. Annabeth tames the dog, allowing them to escape, but Grover realizes that he lost his pearl. In the Asphodel Meadows, Annabeth becomes stuck and has to use her pearl. After reaching Tartarus, Grover is nearly pulled into the pit by the flying shoes, with Percy then discovering the Master Bolt in his gifted backpack. Percy and Grover continue to Hades's Palace, and Hades offers to return Sally if Percy returns his Helm of Darkness, which was also stolen. Percy realizes that Kronos organized the thefts, due to his longstanding grudge against his children. Hades offers to protect them in exchange for the Bolt. Percy refuses, but promises to recover the Helm. The two use their pearls and are brought to Montauk, where they reunite with Annabeth before being confronted by Ares.
| 8 | 8 | "The Prophecy Comes True" | Jet Wilkinson | Craig Silverstein | January 30, 2024 |
Percy challenges Ares to a fight with the first to draw blood winning both the Bolt and the Helm. After summoning a wave, Percy slashes Ares who leaves vowing vengeance. After giving the Helm to a restored Alecto in exchange for his mother, Percy travels to Olympus atop the Empire State Building and returns the Bolt to Zeus, who plans to continue his war. When Zeus is about to strike Percy, Poseidon intervenes and surrenders where the two agree to inform the council of the threat of Kronos. After Poseidon sends him back to camp, Percy realizes that Luke is the thief due to the shoes. After confirming this and failing to recruit Percy, Luke subdues him in a fight. However, Annabeth reveals herself, having heard everything, and Luke flees. On the last day of camp, Percy leaves to reunite with Sally, Annabeth leaves to reconnect with her family, and Grover leaves to search the seas for Pan. The trio promises to reunite in a year. Kronos informs Percy in a dream that he is key to his return.

=== Season 2 (2025–26) ===
The second season is based on the novel The Sea of Monsters.

| No. overall | No. in season | Title | Directed by | Written by | Original release date |
|---|---|---|---|---|---|
| 9 | 1 | "I Play Dodgeball with Cannibals" | James Bobin | Rick Riordan & Craig Silverstein | December 10, 2025 |
Percy spends the school year at Meriwether College Prep with Tyson, a homeless classmate whom Sally recognizes as a Cyclops and takes care of. Percy dreams of Grover being captured after being cornered by demigods allied with Luke. On the last day of school, Percy and Tyson are picked up by the Gray Sisters' Taxi and Annabeth, who warns them that the camp is in danger. They are attacked by three Laestrygonians, one of whom is killed by Clarisse, and discover Luke poisoning Thalia's tree, weakening the camp's protective barrier. When Clarisse and the new activities director King Tantalus threaten Tyson, Poseidon claims him, leaving Percy shocked. Percy and Annabeth request a quest to save the tree, but are denied by Mr. D and Tantalus. Through an empathy link with Grover, Percy learns that Grover is imprisoned by the Cyclops Polyphemus and that the Golden Fleece, which can heal anything, is on his island. Using coordinates from Grover and the Gray Sisters, Percy decides to seek the Fleece to save the tree.
| 10 | 2 | "Demon Pigeons Attack" | James Bobin | Sarah Watson | December 10, 2025 |
Annabeth contacts Chiron, who warns her that Percy cannot quest for the Fleece because of the Great Prophecy. During a camp chariot race that Annabeth plans to sabotage to keep Percy at camp, Stymphalian birds attack after breaking through the barrier, and Annabeth recalls they are driven away by high-pitched sounds, which she, Percy, and Tyson use by playing "Emotions". With the barrier set to fail within a week, Tantalus assigns Clarisse a quest for the Fleece, and she selects Annabeth and Chris, the latter at Annabeth's request, much to Percy's annoyance. Percy flees and prays to Poseidon, after which Hermes appears with permission for him to quest for Grover and gives him a wind thermos and special vitamins. When Annabeth tries to stop Percy, Tantalus attempts to shoot them but is stopped by Tyson, allowing Percy, Annabeth, and Tyson to escape and head for a cruise ship bound for the Sea of Monsters within the Bermuda Triangle.
| 11 | 3 | "We Board the Princess Andromeda" | Jason Ensler | Tamara Becher-Wilkinson | December 17, 2025 |
Clarisse consults the Oracle and, despite being warned her quest will fail, chooses to go alone. Ares equips her with an ironclad warship and an undead army and tells her to find the Fleece before Percy. Percy, Annabeth, and Tyson board the Princess Andromeda, where Percy and Annabeth confront Alison Simms, an ally of Luke; she falls overboard during the fight. Percy later recognizes Kronos' scythe as the ship's emblem, linking it to Luke's forces. Captured by Luke while Tyson is taken below, Percy and Annabeth are shown Kronos' sarcophagus and told the Fleece will speed his return; Luke claims Percy's support would bring Kronos back immediately and prevent a second Olympian-Titan war that would devastate humanity. Tyson causes an explosion, allowing the trio to escape. Clarisse later learns Tantalus gave her false coordinates and needs Percy's help, while Annabeth tells Percy about the Great Prophecy foretelling that a child of the Big Three will either save or destroy Olympus.
| 12 | 4 | "Clarisse Blows Up Everything" | Jason Ensler | Shae Worthy | December 24, 2025 |
In the past, Grover tries to take Annabeth, Luke, and Thalia to camp. After Annabeth is kidnapped by Cyclopes and rescued by Thalia, they decide to go for Annabeth's safety, and an attack of Furies forces Thalia to sacrifice herself so the others can reach safely. In the present, Tyson worries about the Great Prophecy, but Percy comforts him as they are cornered by Clarisse and her crew. Percy challenges Clarisse to a duel to decide who goes to the Sea of Monsters; Annabeth kills three essential crew members forcing Clarisse to take them. Annabeth convinces Clarisse to face Scylla and sacrifice six crew members to enter the Sea of Monsters. Percy reassures Annabeth about the future and converses with Clarisse about their quests. They begin the first trial with Scylla taking three men when Clarisse changes course to face Charybdis. While Clarisse attacks Charybdis, Percy tries to change course by controlling the water in the whirlpool, but the thermos opens completely and destroys the ironclad with them inside a cyclone.
| 13 | 5 | "We Check In to C.C.'s Spa & Resort" | Catriona McKenzie | Sarah Watson | December 31, 2025 |
Percy and Annabeth awaken at Circe's spa, where they learn that Tyson and Clarisse are possibly dead and that they must survive the Sirens to leave. Clarisse awakens on the shore of an island and reunites with Grover after Polyphemus captures her. Grover convinces her to escape another way, but forgets his disguise when Polyphemus returns. Percy learns from Circe that his fatal flaw is his friends, which can endanger him and the world. Percy confronts Circe about helping a few heroes with beeswax and that her training is a sham, so Circe transforms him into a guinea pig. Polyphemus deceives Clarisse using his voice mimicry and plans to use both as bait. Annabeth finds Percy and transforms him and the other guinea pigs back into humans with vitamins. Circe steals back the wax, and Annabeth faces the Sirens alone with the help of her mother Athena, but it turns out to be an illusion caused by the Sirens; Percy rescues her, and they leave, arriving at Polyphemus's island.
| 14 | 6 | "Nobody Gets the Fleece" | Catriona McKenzie | Albert Kim | January 7, 2026 |
After the ironclad was destroyed, Tyson sank into the sea and was rescued by a hippocampus. In the present, Percy dreams of Thalia destroying camp before he and Annabeth disguise themselves as sheep to pass Polyphemus. Luke sends Annabeth an Iris Message warning her about Polyphemus, learns her location, and teleports to the island. As Percy descends into the cave to rescue Grover and Clarisse, he is trapped by Polyphemus, and Annabeth discovers the Fleece is a fake planted as bait. Invisible, Annabeth distracts Polyphemus by reminding him of how Odysseus once tricked and blinded him. After Grover finds the real Fleece, Polyphemus returns and knocks Annabeth unconscious. Tyson arrives and fights Polyphemus while Luke finds Annabeth is dying. Percy offers Luke the Fleece to heal her, and Luke does so but takes both Annabeth and the Fleece to the Princess Andromeda. Tyson then frees Percy, Grover, and Clarisse and summons four hippocampi to rescue Annabeth and recover the Fleece.
| 15 | 7 | "I Go Down with the Ship" | Jason Ensler | Tamara Becher-Wilkinson | January 14, 2026 |
In the past, Chiron states to the campers that Zeus turns Thalia into a tree after she sacrifices herself battling the Furies, much to Luke's dismay. In the present, Percy and the group obtain a keycard to enter the ship, but he and Clarisse pursue different plans. Luke places the Fleece on Kronos' sarcophagus. Percy finds Annabeth, but becomes invisible when Luke arrives. Annabeth tries to convince Luke that the Fleece could bring Thalia back. Kronos orders Alison to kill Annabeth; Clarisse defeats Alison and her group to save her. Percy finds the Fleece, and Kronos unsuccessfully tries to persuade him not to take it. Luke finds Percy, and they fight. Percy escapes but is stabbed by Luke and healed by the Fleece. Percy sends Clarisse to camp with the Fleece on the back of Luke's pegasus Blackjack. Sally takes Percy and the group to the camp, with Percy troubled by his vision of Thalia killing everyone there. Kronos orders Luke to kill Percy.
| 16 | 8 | "The Fleece Works Its Magic Too Well" | Catriona McKenzie | Craig Silverstein | January 21, 2026 |
Upon arriving at camp, Percy learns that Clarisse didn't reach the tree and that Laestrygonians breached the barrier and killed Tantalus. Percy overhears Luke's plan to free Thalia so she can destroy Olympus and leads the campers to fight Kronos's army. Clarisse discovers that Chris sided with Kronos, but is rescued by Annabeth and Grover. Annabeth is injured by Alison, but Clarisse manages to get the Fleece to Thalia's tree, where she revives and unleashes a powerful bolt that incapacitates Percy and drives the enemy away. While unconscious, Percy encounters Poseidon, who warns him of the coming war and enlists Tyson's help. After Percy awakens, Chiron reveals that the Furies didn't kill Thalia, but told her the Great Prophecy, and Zeus turned her into a tree when she defied him. Chiron deduces that Kronos planned to bring Thalia back, hoping to use her as his champion. Thalia awakens and reunites with Annabeth under Percy's watchful eye.

=== Season 3 (2026) ===
The third season is based on the novel The Titan's Curse.

| No. overall | No. in season | Title | Directed by | Written by | Original release date |
|---|---|---|---|---|---|
| 17 | 1 | "My Rescue Operation Goes Very Wrong" | James Bobin | Craig Silverstein | November 20, 2026 |
Thalia fights a Laestrygonian while asking about Luke, until Percy and Annabeth arrive to help defeat it. Despite Percy's doubts about Thalia, Annabeth asks her to help escort two demigods to camp. At Westover Hall, they meet Grover, who is working undercover and helps them find siblings Bianca and Nico di Angelo during the winter dance. Annabeth reveals Percy that she has been invited to join the Hunters of Artemis for eternity, hence her interest in him and Thalia getting along. Meanwhile, Thalia and Grover discover that Dr. Thorn is a Manticore disguised as the headmaster. They fight his staff, but Percy, Thalia, Bianca, and Nico are captured. Thorn warns Percy and Thalia that they will be transported to the "General". As they are about to be taken, Percy and Thalia break free and fight back just when Artemis and her huntresses arrive and kill the staff. Annabeth then stabs Thorn, but he takes her instead of Percy and Thalia. Percy tries to go after her, but Artemis warns him that he can no longer do so.
| 18 | 2 | "An Old Dead Friend Comes to Visit" | James Bobin | Albert Kim | November 20, 2026 |
Percy and Thalia meet Artemis, who tells them that Annabeth is in Titan territory. When Percy reveals that they were to be taken before the "General", Artemis realizes that Atlas has returned. Percy asks her to grant them the mission to rescue Annabeth, which she initially agrees but secretly orders her Huntress, Zoë Nightshade, to stop them when necessary. Apollo takes the group to camp, while Annabeth is led by Thorn to Luke, who is holding the Weight of the Sky. After entering his memories, she convinces him and takes his place. Percy and Thalia argue about the will of the gods and when they begin discussing about Luke, they fight until Chiron intervenes. Thalia is captured by the Huntresses, but Percy escapes. Zoë reveals that Artemis has ordered the forbidden children of the gods to remain at camp while she hunts the Bane of Olympus. Percy frees Thalia when the Oracle announces that Atlas has defeated Artemis and selects the demigods and Huntresses for the quest.
| 19 | 3 | "I Learn How to Grow Zombies" | TBA | Sarah Watson | November 27, 2026 |
| 20 | 4 | "We Visit the Junkyard of the Gods" | TBA | Tamara Becher-Wilkinson | November 27, 2026 |
| 21 | 5 | "I Have a Dam Problem" | TBA | Shae Worthy | December 4, 2026 |
| 22 | 6 | "I Wrestle Santa's Evil Twin" | TBA | Albert Kim | December 4, 2026 |
| 23 | 7 | "I Put on a Few Million Extra Pounds" | TBA | Craig Silverstein | December 11, 2026 |
| 24 | 8 | "The Gods Vote How to Kill Us" | TBA | Craig Silverstein | December 11, 2026 |

== Production ==
=== Development ===
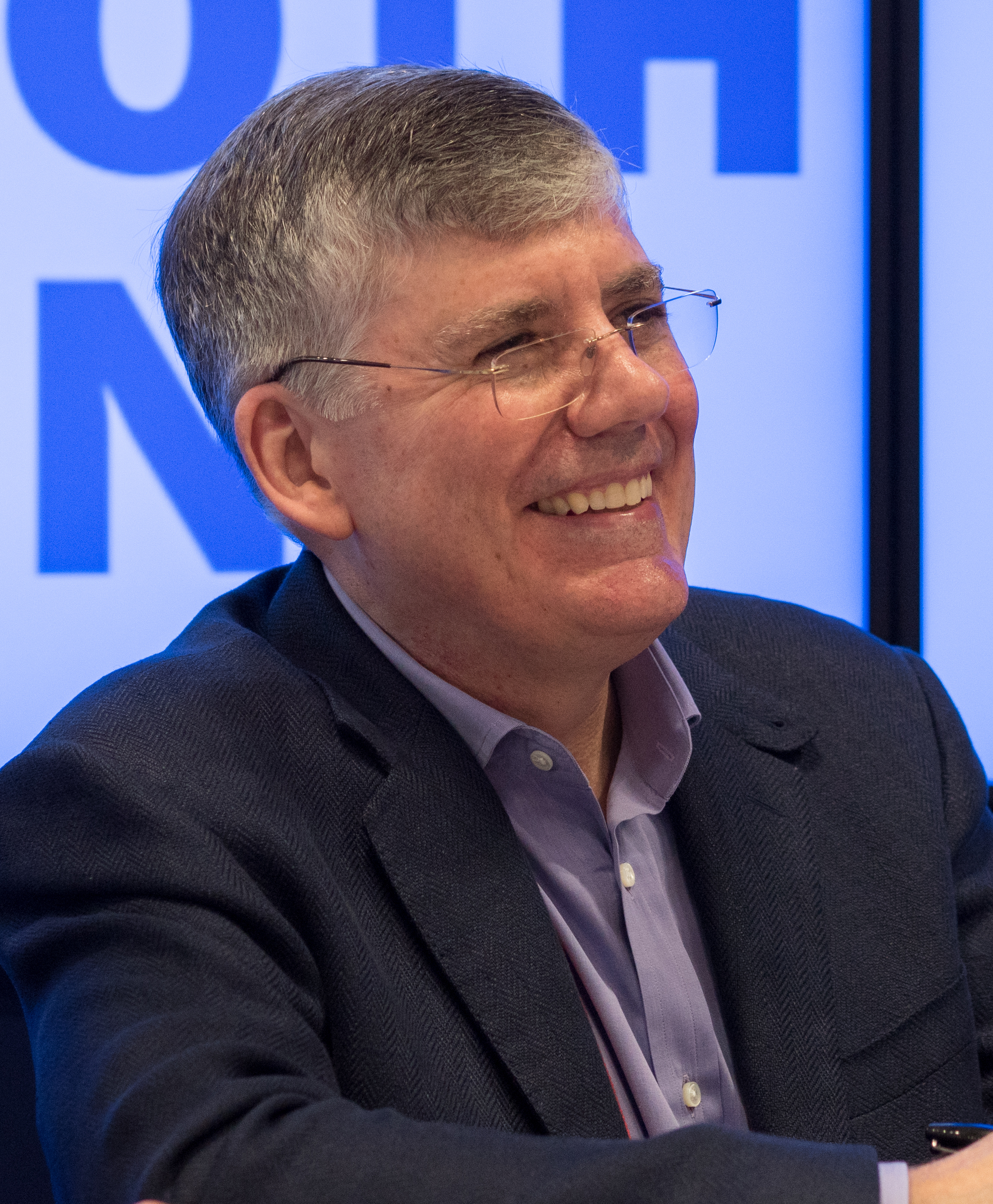
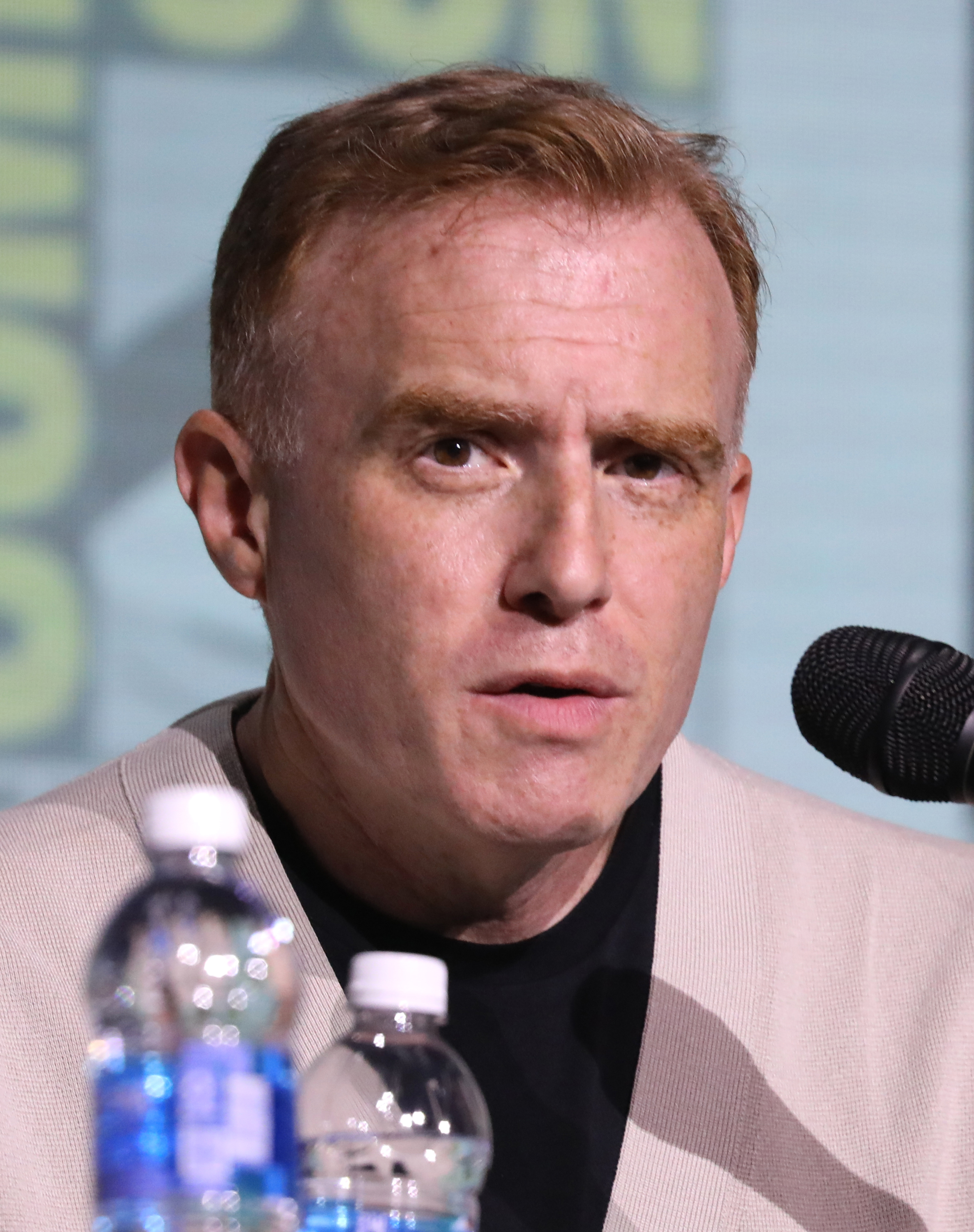
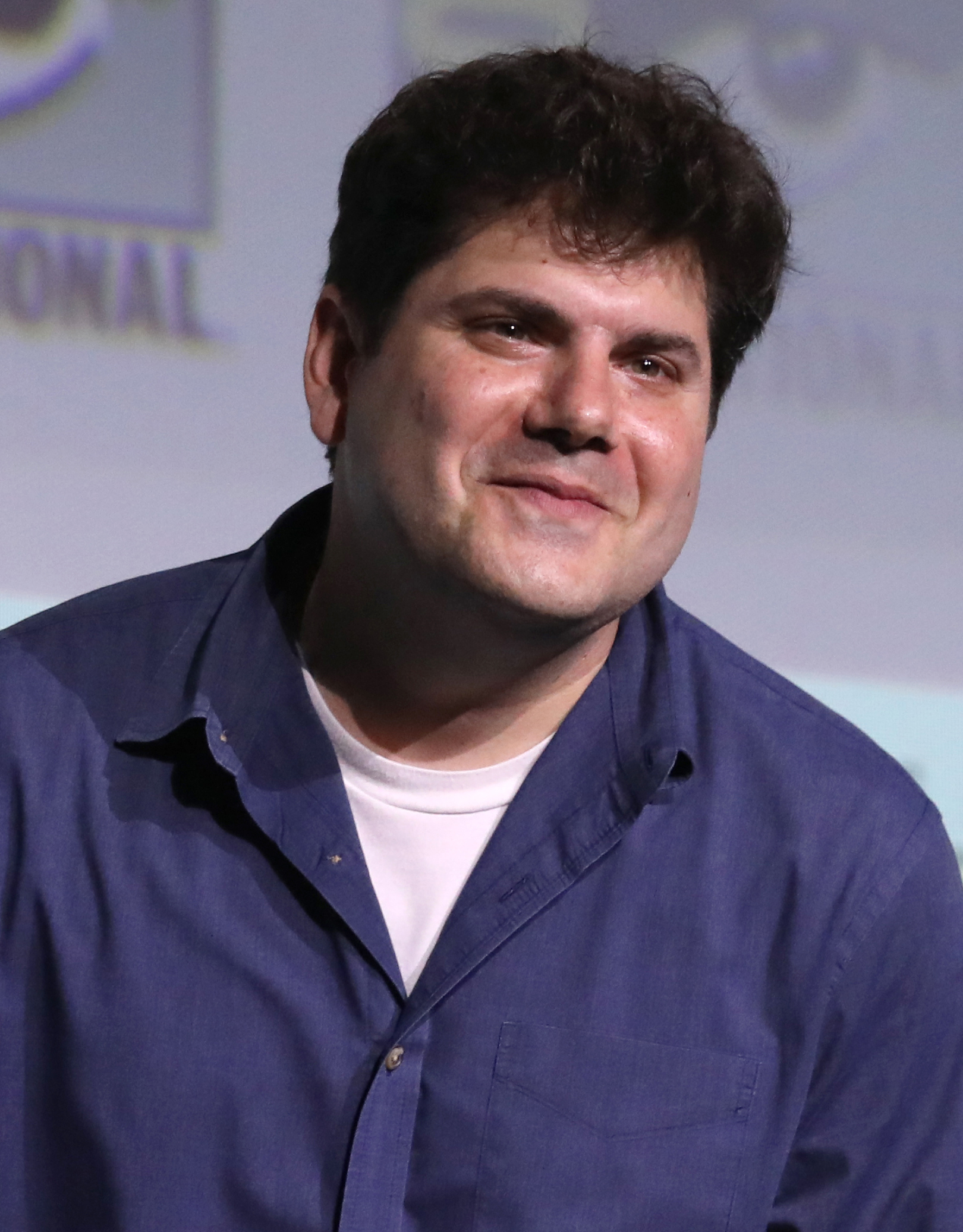
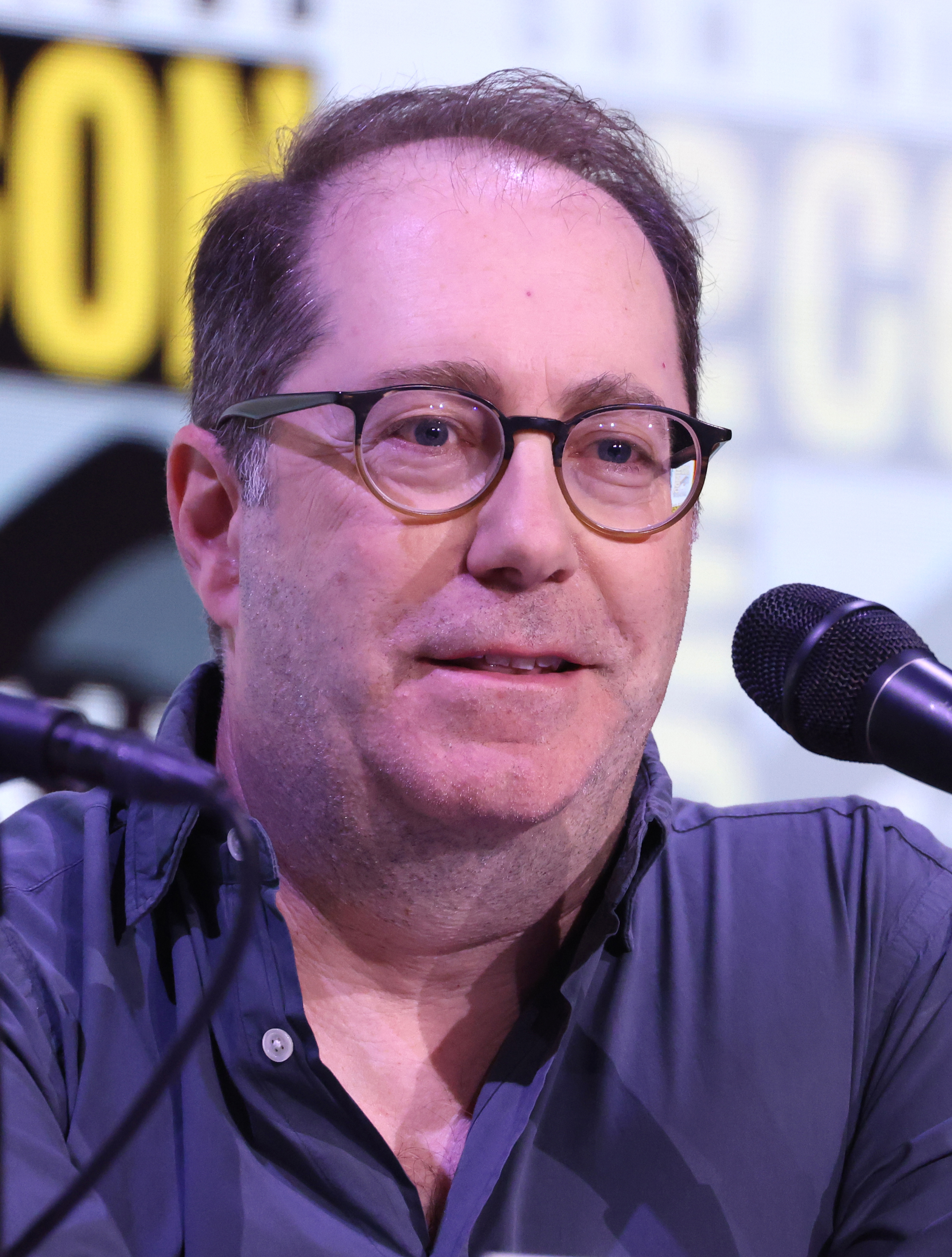
Producers, clockwise from top left: Rick Riordan, Jonathan E. Steinberg, Craig Silverstein, and Dan Shotz

In November 2018, Rick Riordan stated that he believed he would have no creative control over a reboot of the Percy Jackson & the Olympians novel series by The Walt Disney Company if it were to happen, much like his experience with the film series with 20th Century Fox. In December 2019, Riordan pitched an adaptation of the novels to Disney, which had acquired Fox in March of that year. By May 2020, a Disney+ series based on Percy Jackson was in the works, with the first season set to adapt the first book in the series, The Lightning Thief. Riordan revealed in March 2021 that searches for the series' directors and cast was underway, with James Bobin being announced as the pilot episode's director in October. Jonathan E. Steinberg and Dan Shotz were also announced as showrunners in July.

The series was greenlit by Disney Branded Television in January 2022, with 20th Television and the Gotham Group producing the project. Steinberg, Shotz, Bobin, and Riordan were announced as executive producers alongside Riordan's wife Rebecca Riordan, Bert Salke, Monica Owusu-Breen, Jim Rowe, Anders Engström, Jet Wilkinson, Ellen Goldsmith-Vein, Jeremy Bell, and D. J. Goldberg. At the D23 Expo in September, Anders Engström and Jet Wilkinson were revealed to be executive producing the series as well. The same month, Riordan revealed that Engström would direct the third and fourth episodes while Wilkinson would direct the fifth and sixth. The series was reportedly made with a budget of $12 to 15 million per episode.

In February 2024, Disney+ renewed the series for a second season, which adapts the second book, The Sea of Monsters. In April 2024, Albert Kim was announced as a new executive producer starting with the second season. The series was renewed for a third season in March 2025, which adapts the third book, The Titan's Curse, set to premiere in 2026.

=== Writing ===
Drafts of the pilot episode were being reviewed by March 2021. In April 2021, it was announced that Steinberg would serve as co-writer and executive producer of the pilot alongside Riordan. The same day, Monica Owusu-Breen, Daphne Olive, Stewart Strandberg, Zoë Neary, Joe Tracz, and Xavier Stiles joined as writers. Each season of the series will adapt one installment of the book series, with the first season being an adaptation of The Lightning Thief. There are also plans to adapt additional material within the franchise for the series. In addition to writing the pilot, Riordan and co-showrunner Steinberg created a series bible for the show, as well as planning the plot for the first season and creating ideas for potential future seasons. The first season consists of eight episodes.

Writing for the second season had begun by March 2023. Plans for future seasons include a further exploration of Chiron's disability. Writing for the third season had begun by late February 2025.

=== Casting ===
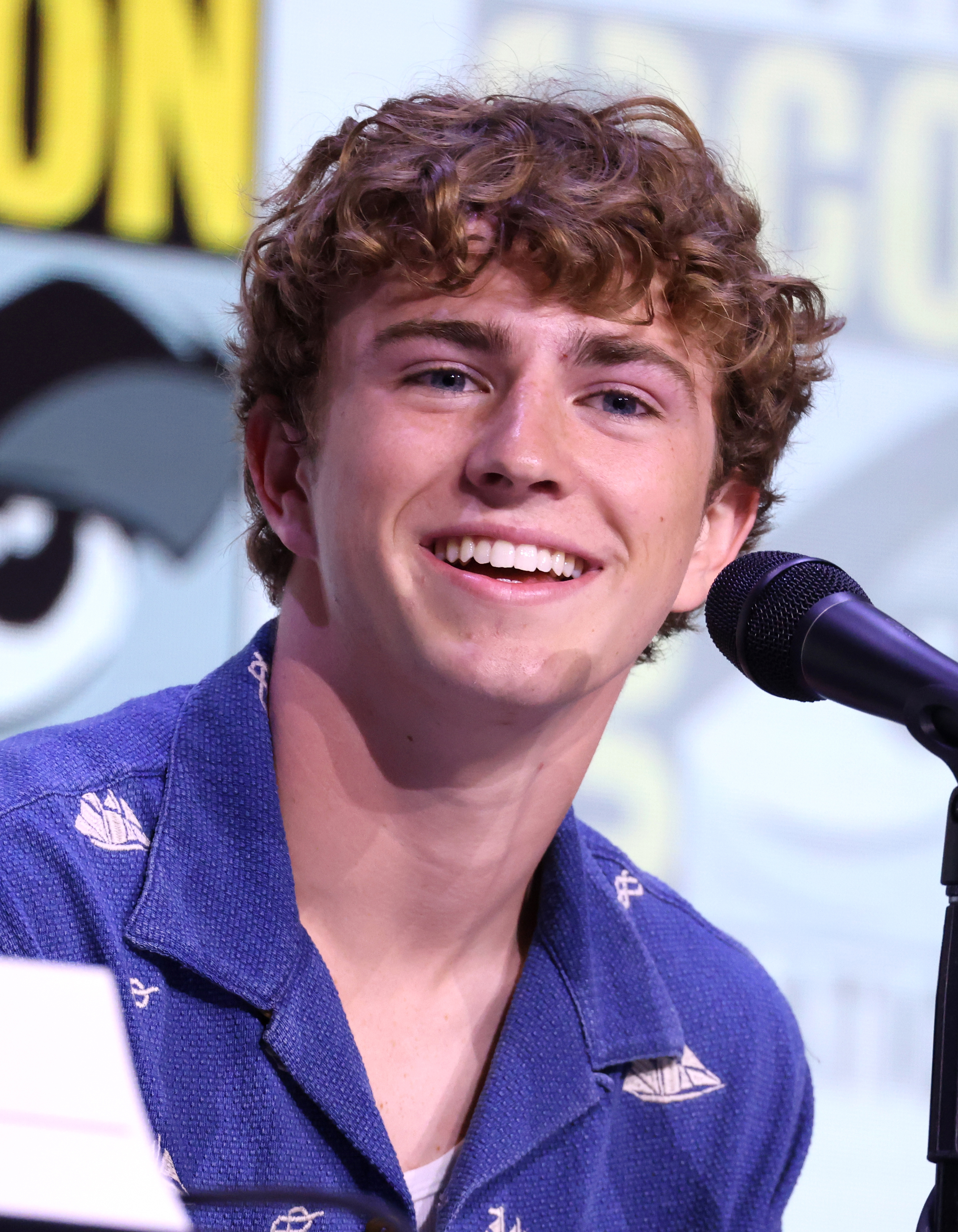
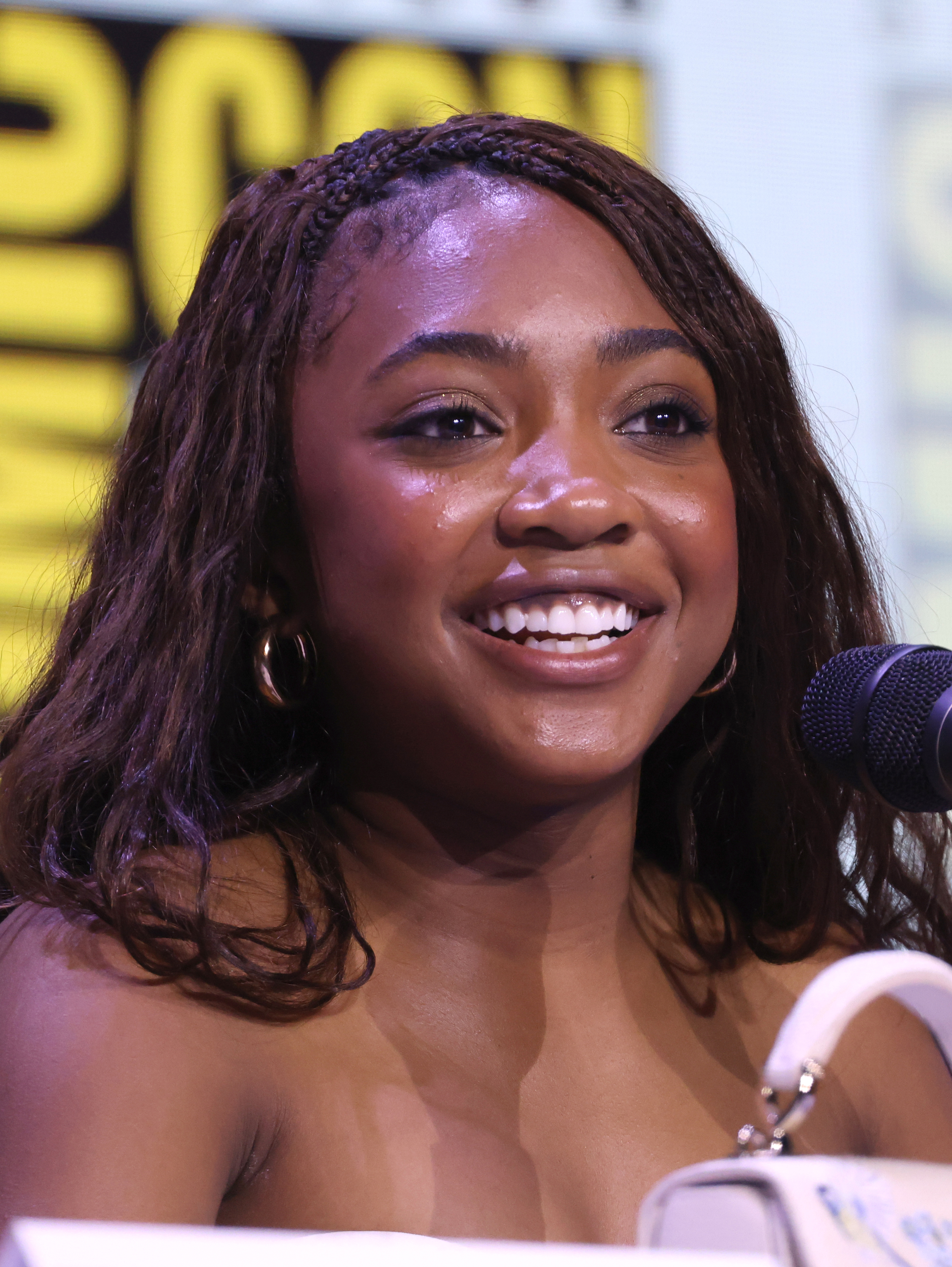
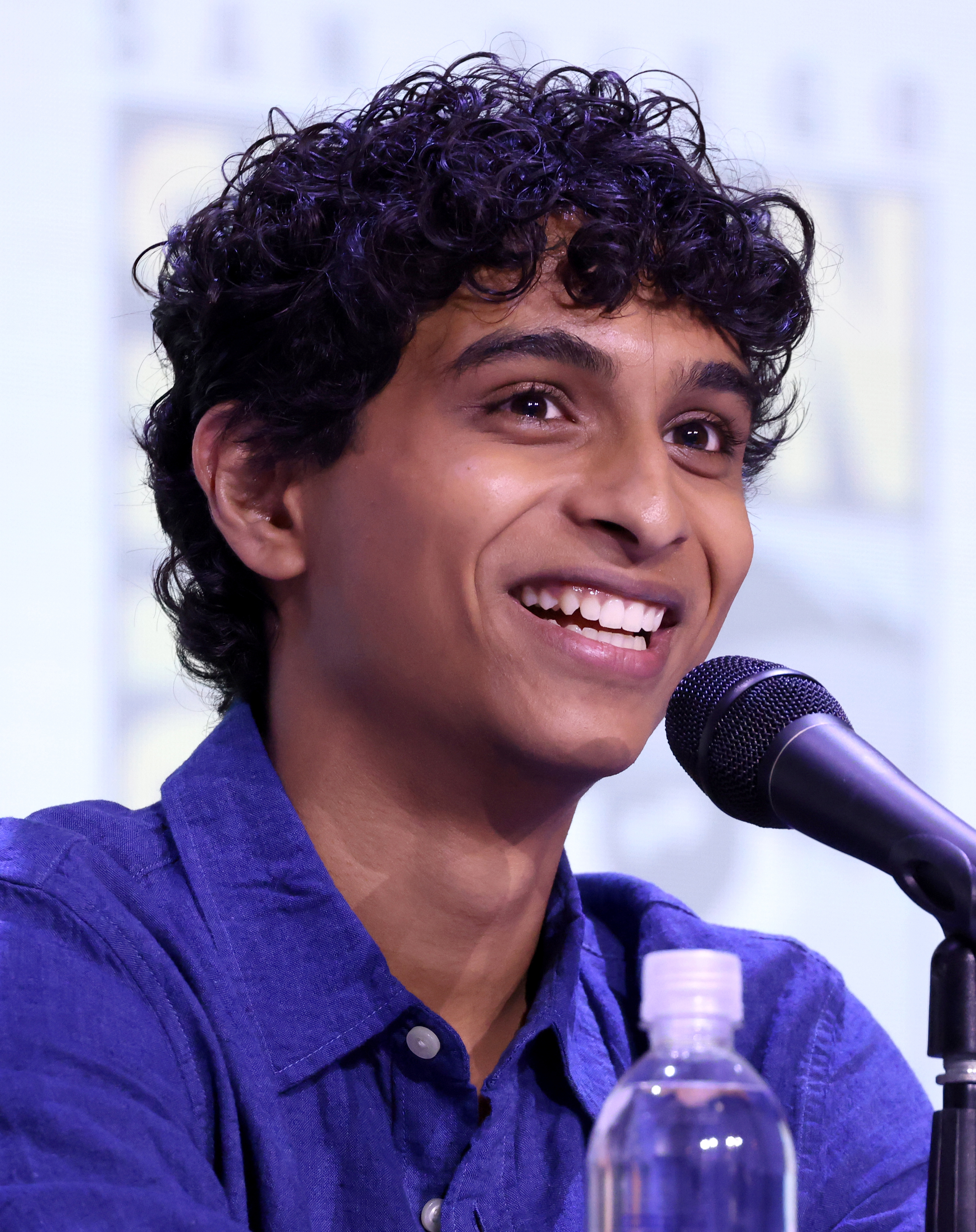
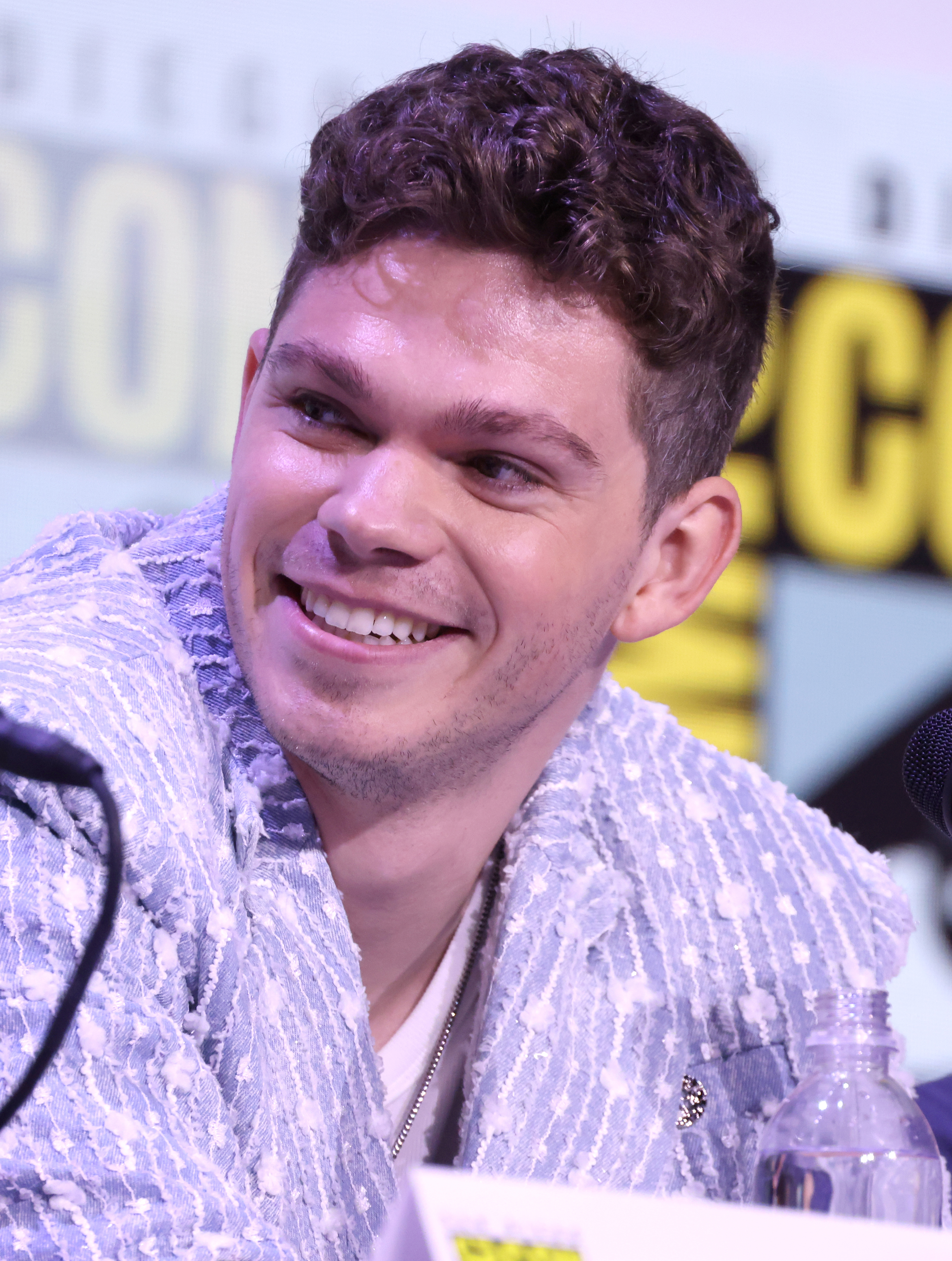
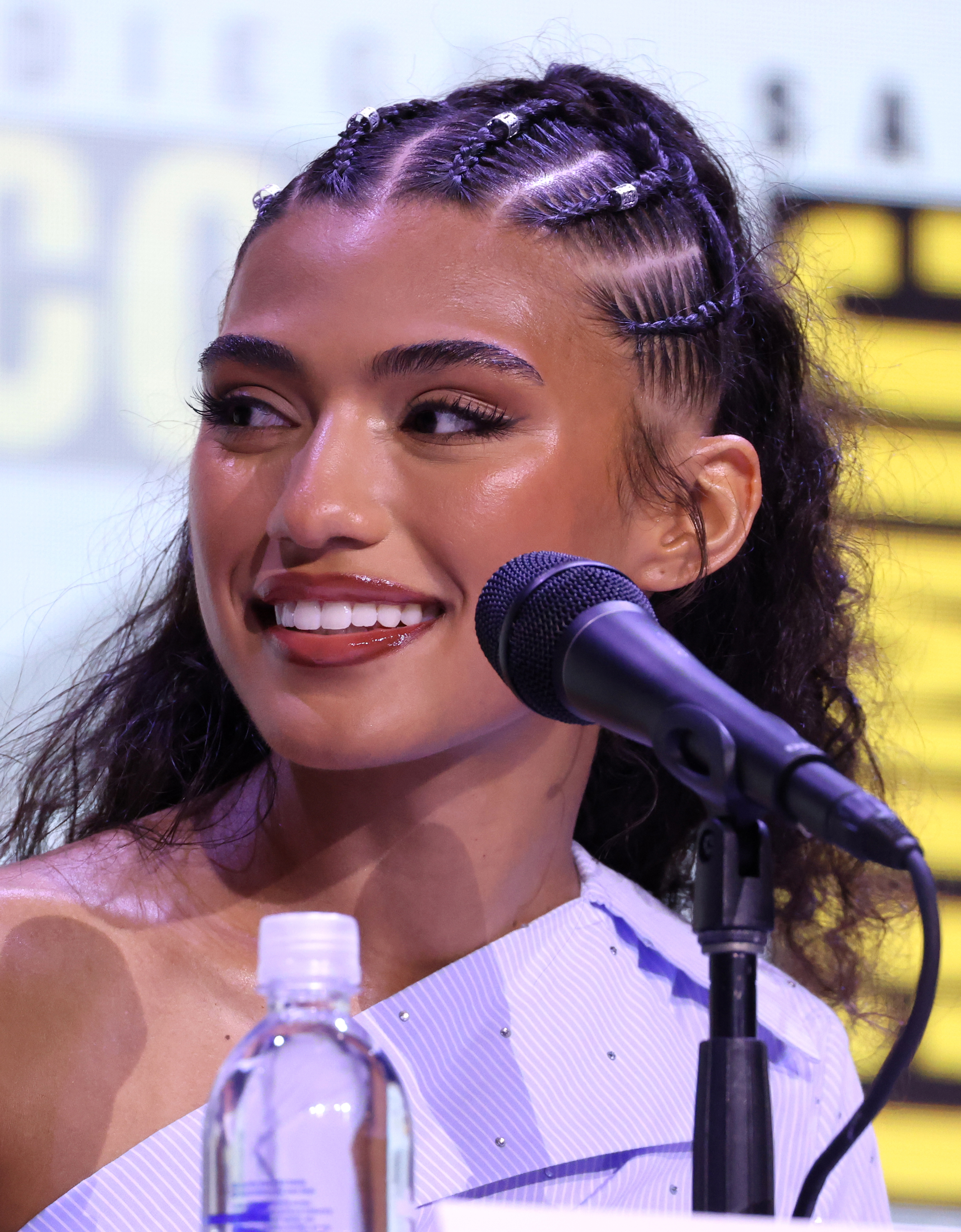
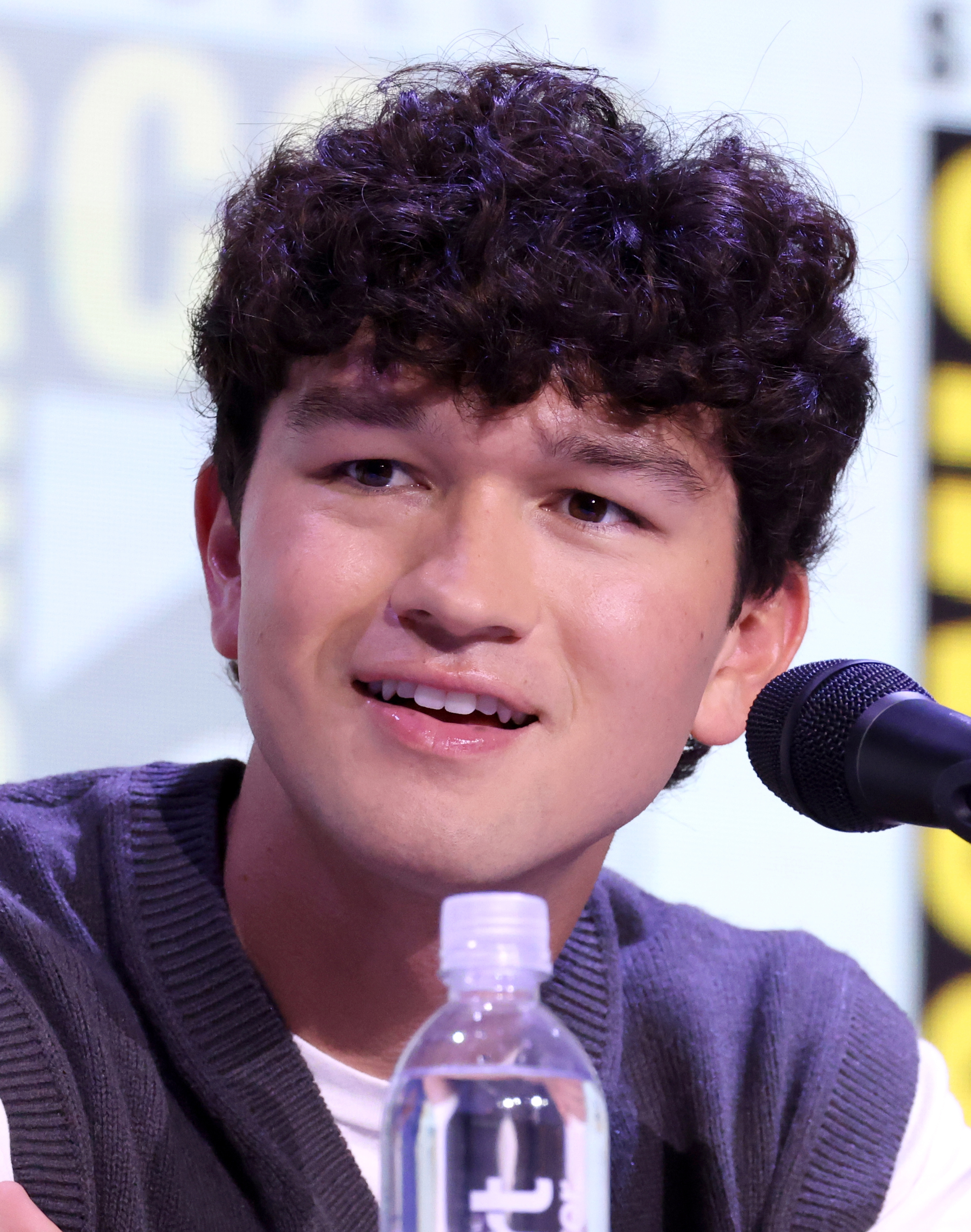
The main cast for the second season, clockwise from top left: Walker Scobell (Percy), Leah Sava Jeffries (Annabeth), Aryan Simhadri (Grover), Charlie Bushnell (Luke), Dior Goodjohn (Clarisse), and Daniel Diemer (Tyson)

Preliminary casting began in April 2021. In January 2022, Walker Scobell was cast in the lead role as Percy Jackson, with this being announced in April. The next month, it was announced that Leah Sava Jeffries and Aryan Simhadri would respectively portray Annabeth Chase and Grover Underwood, two close friends of Percy. Jeffries' casting received online backlash due to Annabeth not being depicted as black in the novels, which Riordan claimed was racism, and stated, "Once you see Leah as Annabeth, she will become exactly the way you imagine Annabeth, assuming you give her that chance, but you refuse to credit that this may be true." Logan Lerman, who played Percy in the film series, praised the casting of Scobell, Jeffries and Simhadri in their roles.

In June, Virginia Kull, Glynn Turman, Jason Mantzoukas, Megan Mullally, and Timm Sharp were announced to be appearing in recurring capacities as Sally Jackson, Chiron, Dionysus, Alecto, and Gabe Ugliano, respectively. The same month, Dior Goodjohn and Charlie Bushnell joined the cast in recurring roles as Clarisse La Rue and Luke Castellan, respectively, while Olivea Morton was announced to portray Nancy Bobofit in a guest role. Pro wrestler Adam Copeland was cast in the recurring role of Ares in October, while Suzanne Cryer and Jessica Parker Kennedy were cast in the guest roles of Echidna and Medusa, respectively. In November 2022, Lin-Manuel Miranda, Jay Duplass, and Timothy Omundson were announced to guest-star as Hermes, Hades, and Hephaestus, respectively; as were Lance Reddick and Toby Stephens in January 2023, announced to portray Zeus and Poseidon, respectively. Jason Gray-Stanford was cast in an undisclosed role in March 2023, later revealed to be Maron.

On July 25, Daniel Diemer was announced as the actor portraying Tyson during San Diego Comic-Con. On August 10, Sandra Bernhard, Kristen Schaal, and Margaret Cho were announced to be portraying the Gray Sisters during D23 Expo, with each of them portraying Anger, Tempest and Wasp, respectively. On August 15, Timothy Simons was announced as the actor for Tantalus. On September 23, Tamara Smart was revealed to be playing Thalia Grace. On November 10, the actress for Athena was revealed to be Andra Day during D23 Brazil. On November 25, Courtney B. Vance was announced as the replacement actor for Zeus, following Reddick's death in March 2023. On December 20, Rosemarie DeWitt, Aleks Paunovic, Beatrice Kitsos, and Kevin Chacon were announced in guest roles as C.C., Polyphemus, Alison Simms, and Chris Rodriguez respectively.

At San Diego Comic-Con 2025, it was announced that Levi Chrisopulos and Olive Abercrombie were cast as Nico di Angelo and Bianca di Angelo, respectively, the children of Hades. On an interview, Riordan confirmed that they were already in talks to cast Atlas, the season's villain. On August 21, 2025, Dafne Keen and Saara Chaudry were announced as the actresses for Artemis and Zoë Nightshade. On October 15, 2025, Kate McKinnon was revealed to be portraying Aphrodite. On December 22, Holt McCallany, David Costabile, and Jesse L. Martin were announced to be the actors portraying Atlas, Dr. Thorn, and Frederick Chase respectively. On February 19, 2026, Ming-Na Wen, Jennifer Beals, and Hubert Smielecki rounded out the cast of the Twelve Olympians as Hera, Demeter, and Apollo.

=== Filming ===
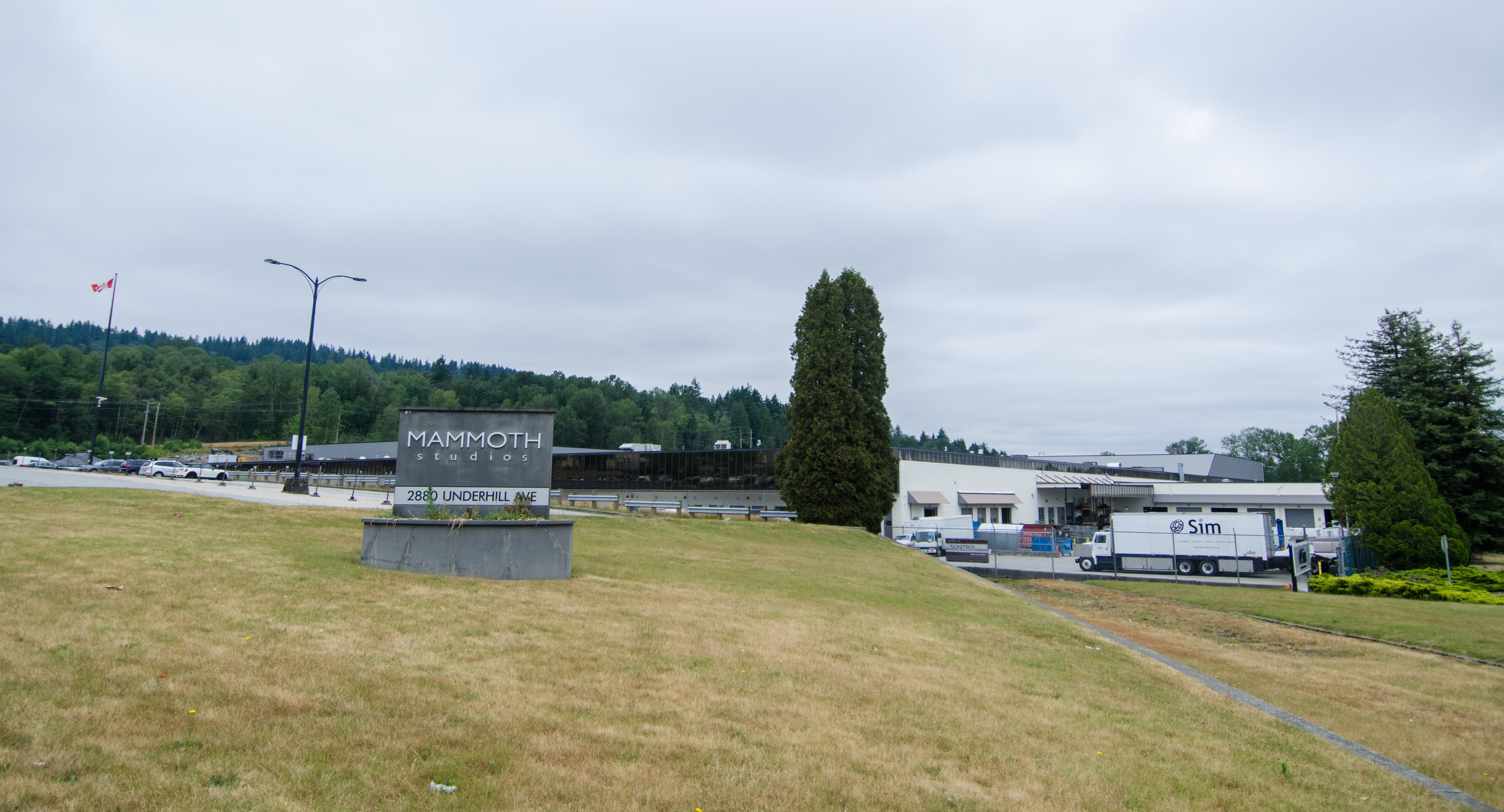
Mammoth Studios (pictured in 2019)

Principal photography for the first season began on June 2, 2022, in Vancouver, British Columbia, under the working title Mink Golden, and concluded on February 2, 2023. Sound stage filming took place at Mammoth Studios in Burnaby. The series utilized an LED stage powered by Industrial Light & Magic's StageCraft visual effects technology. Filming of scenes set in Camp Half-Blood was done in Minaty Bay and Aldergrove, Langley. Scenes at Yancy Academy were filmed at Hycroft Manor. Westminster Pier Park in New Westminster and Simon Fraser University were the filming locations for the Gateway Arch.

Principal photography for the second season began on August 1, 2024, in Vancouver and concluded on January 31, 2025. Filming for the duel between Percy and Clarisse was done at Spanish Banks between September 19 and 20. Additional location filming for the scenes on Polyphemus' island took place in Osoyoos and the Okanagan Valley. Scenes set in Port Jefferson, New York, were filmed in Steveston, British Columbia.

Pre-production for the third season took place in July 2025. Principal photography began on August 7 in Vancouver and concluded on March 12, 2026.

=== Design ===
Dan Hennah serves as the production designer for the first two seasons. Helen Jarvis serves as the production designer for the third season. Tish Monaghan serves as the costume designer for the first season. Catherine Adair serves as the costume designer for the second season. Jennifer Bryan serves as the costume designer for the third season.

=== Music ===
By October 2023, Bear McCreary had been writing music for the series, after previously working with Steinberg and Shotz in the series Human Target, Black Sails and See. Members of the music company Sparks & Shadows, which McCreary was a co-founder of, were involved. The score for the first season was released digitally by Hollywood Records on December 22, with Sparks & Shadows credited as composer and McCreary credited with writing the themes. The score for the second season was released digitally by Hollywood Records on December 18, 2025.

== Marketing ==
A teaser for the series was revealed during the D23 Expo in September 2022. Rotem Rusak of Nerdist highlighted how the teaser featured the opening lines of The Lightning Thief, while Kendall Myers of Collider noted the teaser's dark tone. A second teaser trailer for the first season was released on September 19, 2023. The trailer was released on November 16 and was viewed 84.3 million times in the first 10 days across all social media platforms.

The first teaser for the second season was revealed during the D23 Expo in August 2024. A second teaser trailer for the season was released on July 24, 2025, at San Diego Comic-Con. The trailer was released on November 6. The trailer was viewed 135.9 million times in the first 10 days across all social media platforms; a 60% increase compared to the trailer for the first season in the same timeframe. A special recap crossover with Phineas and Ferb, titled Phineas and Ferb Recap: Percy Jackson, was released on December 5, 2025.

With the end of the second season, the finale offered a first look at the third season, featuring Percy and Annabeth dancing together. The producers and part of the cast of the third season attended San Diego Comic-Con on July 23, 2026, to talk about the season, and footage from the season was shown.

== Release ==
While the first season was initially expected in early 2024, Hulu announced episodes would be available to stream beginning December 20, 2023. The first season premiered on Disney+ with two episodes on December 19, a day earlier than previously scheduled. A red carpet premiere event was held in New York City at the Metropolitan Museum of Art on December 13 and at the Odeon Luxe Leicester Square in London on December 16. Eight episodes were released weekly until January 30, 2024. The season made its linear broadcast debut on Disney Channel on May 2, 2025.

The second season premiered on December 10, 2025, on Disney+ and Hulu, with its two first episodes, while remaining episodes were released on a weekly basis up until the season finale on January 21, 2026. A red carpet premiere event was held in Los Angeles at the Academy Museum of Motion Pictures on December 3, at Ibirapuera Park in São Paulo on December 7, at Picturehouse Central in London on December 10, at the Teatro Calderón in Madrid on December 13, and at the Paley Center for Media in New York City on December 17. In October, it was announced that the first two seasons would stream for three months on Netflix starting on October 4 as part of a licensing agreement between Disney Entertainment and Netflix.

The third season premiered on November 20, 2026, with its two first episodes, while remaining episodes will release weekly in pairs until the season finale on December 11. The season premiere was held in New York City at the Empire State Building on November 17.

== Reception ==
=== Viewership ===
In December 2023, Disney announced that 13.3 million viewers watched the premiere episode of Percy Jackson and the Olympians within its first six days on Disney+ and Hulu. Analytics company Samba TV, which gathers viewership data from certain smart TVs and content providers, reported that 898,000 U.S. households watched the first episode on Disney+ during the same period, noting that Gen Z households (ages 20–24) were overrepresented among viewers by 10%. In January 2024, Disney announced that the episode had been viewed by 26.2 million viewers after three weeks. The second through fifth episodes each attracted at least 10 million viewers within seven days of release. Overall, Percy Jackson and the Olympians accumulated 110 million hours streamed across Disney+ and Hulu during its first seven weeks. Through May 10, 2024, the first season was the most-watched Disney+ original series with 23.3% of audience viewership. Luminate, which measures streaming performance in the United States using viewership data, audience engagement metrics, and content reach across multiple platforms, reported that by the end of 2024 the first season remained Disney+'s most-watched original series of the year, with 3.07 billion minutes viewed domestically between December 29, 2023, and December 31, 2024. Whip Media, which tracks viewership data for the more than 25 million worldwide users of its TV Time app, calculated that Percy Jackson and the Olympians was the most-streamed original television in the U.S. from the week ending January 28 through the week ending February 4, 2024. The series remained within the top ten through the week ending February 18, 2024.

Streaming analytics firm FlixPatrol, which monitors daily updated VOD charts and streaming ratings worldwide, reported that the second season became the most-popular show on Disney+ both domestically and internationally within two days of the season premiere. On December 15, 2025, Disney+ Brasil announced that viewership for the second season's premiere was doubled compared to the first season's. Brazil also had the largest international viewing audience for the show with the second season among the ten most-watched series for Disney+ in the country for 2025. Nielsen Media Research, which records streaming viewership on certain U.S. television screens, reported that Percy Jackson and the Olympians generated 508 million minutes of watch time from December 8–14, fifty-two percent of which were for season two. The series subsequently garnered 410 million minutes of viewing time from December 15–21, 436 million minutes between December 22–28, 574 million minutes from December 29 and January 4, and 361 million minutes between January 5–11. Nielsen Media Research reported that Percy Jackson and the Olympians was the most-watched Disney+ original series in the United States for the 2025–26 television season and the 77th most-watched television show across American broadcast television and streaming according to 35-day multiplatform viewership. Luminate subsequently reported that the second season generated 5.8 million views and was streamed for 1.8 billion minutes in the United States during the first half of 2026. The first season amassed 2.8 million views and was streamed for 798.7 million minutes during the same period.

Following its limited release on Netflix, the series debuted as the third most-watched show globally with 4.1 million views and 21.6 million hours streamed between October 5–11. Nielsen Media Research reported that Percy Jackson and the Olympians generated 365 million minutes of watch time during this period in the United States.

=== Critical response ===
Critical response of Percy Jackson and the Olympians
| Season | Rotten Tomatoes | Metacritic |
|---|---|---|
| 1 | 91% (64 reviews) | 73 (26 reviews) |
| 2 | 100% (37 reviews) | 73 (9 reviews) |
| 3 | 100% (14 reviews) | 79 (4 reviews) |

For the first season, on the review aggregator website Rotten Tomatoes, 91% of 64 critics' reviews are positive, with an average of rated reviews of 7.30/10. The website's consensus reads: "A faithful adaptation of Rick Riordan's novels, Percy Jackson and the Olympians is a lovingly realized odyssey through adolescence and myth." Metacritic, which uses a weighted average, assigned a score of 73 out of 100 based on 26 critics, indicating "generally favorable reviews".

Nicole Drum of ComicBook.com wrote "Some of the best casting ever in a television series, fantastic performances, and even the magic of the visuals and world-building, the series is about as perfect a television adaptation as you can get, as if it's been favored by the gods themselves." Matthew Creith of TheWrap praised the writing, describing it as "quick-witted, the action is stellar, and making Percy's journey an episodic tale helps to propel the young character forward in exciting directions." Kathryn Porter of Paste wrote, "From the casting to the writing to the production design, we get the adaptation of The Lightning Thief that we have been wanting for over a decade to see, and there is nowhere to go but up." Aramide Tinubu of Variety wrote, "The series depicts a genuinely inclusive world, showcasing storylines and characters that will captivate fans for the next decade. At long last, Riordan's work has been given the extensive visual adaptation it deserves."

On Rotten Tomatoes, the second season holds an approval rating of 100% based on 37 critic reviews, with an average rating of 7.45/10. The website's critics consensus states, "Taking its young heroes to new seas, Percy Jackson and the Olympians grows bigger and better, bringing us all along for a new glorious adventure." Metacritic, which uses a weighted average, assigned a score of 73 out of 100 based on nine critics, indicating "generally favorable reviews".

On Rotten Tomatoes, the third season has an approval rating of 100% based on 14 critic reviews, with an average rating of 8.1/10. Metacritic, which uses a weighted average, assigned a score of 79 out of 100 based on 4 critics, indicating "generally favorable" reviews.

=== Accolades ===
At the 3rd Children's and Family Emmy Awards, the show won eight of the sixteen awards for which it was nominated (a record number of nominations, until surpassed by Star Wars: Skeleton Crew the following year), including Outstanding Young Teen Series. The series' first season also received nominations at the Directors, Producers and Writers Guilds of America Awards.

== Other media ==
In January 2024, Disney+ announced the behind-the-scenes documentary A Hero's Journey: The Making of Percy Jackson and the Olympians, which premiered alongside the first-season finale on January 30, 2024. A Fortnite island featuring the show's characters entitled Percy Jackson: Siege of Monsters launched on December 9, 2025. Disney Entertainment Television released a companion video podcast starting with the second season through Disney+, Hulu, YouTube, and various podcast platforms alongside each episode release.
