= Charlie Bushnell =

American actor

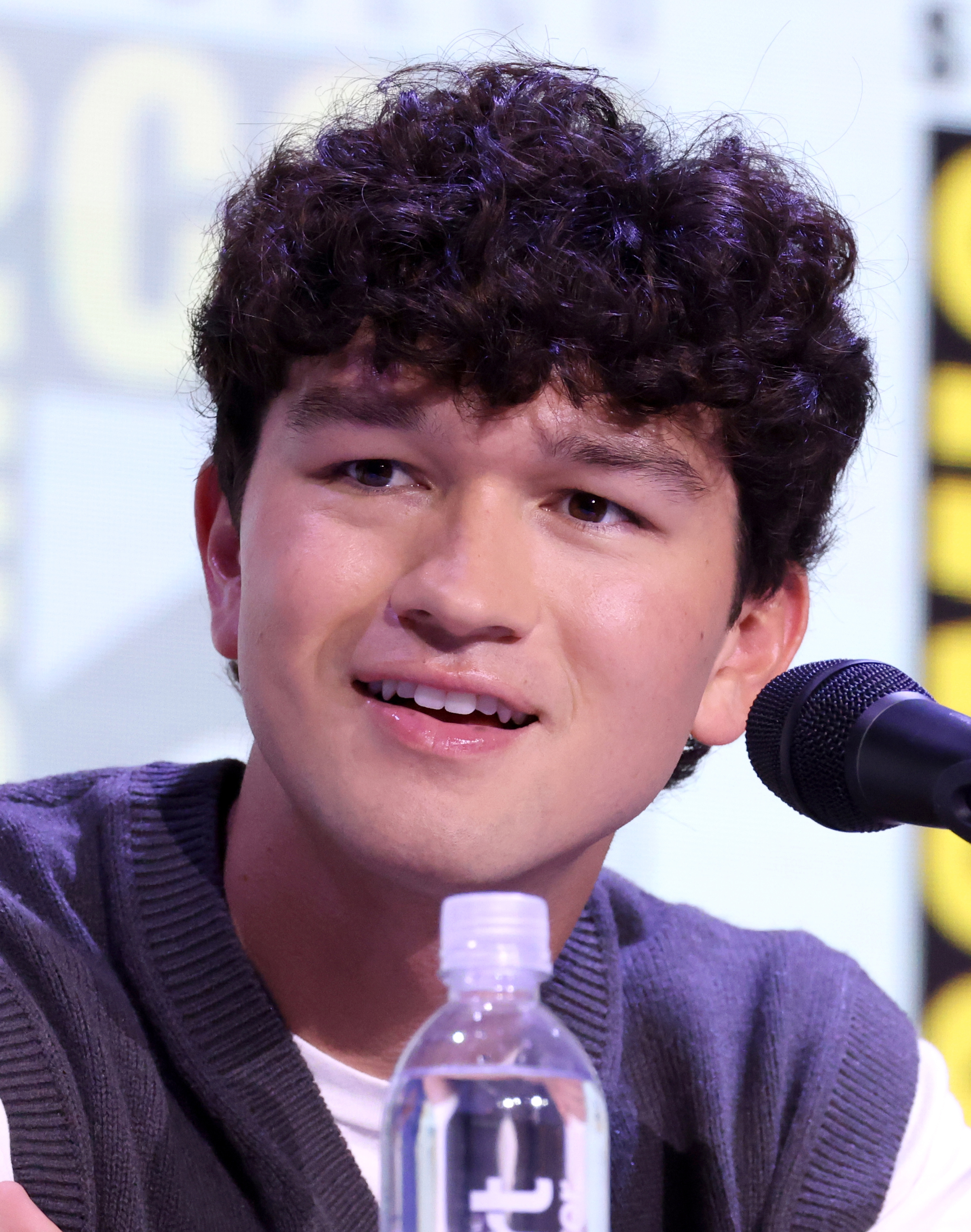
- Bushnell in 2025
- Born: June 16, 2004 (age 22); Los Angeles, California, U.S.
- Occupation: Actor
- Years active: 2018–present
- Known for: Luke Castellan in Percy Jackson & the Olympians

Charlie Bushnell (born June 16, 2004) is an American actor best known for his roles in television series, including Diary of a Future President and Percy Jackson and the Olympians.

== Early life ==
He was born on born June 16, 2004, in Los Angeles, California and resides in the United States. He is of Costa Rican, Japanese and Irish descent.

Bushnell expressed interest in acting after watching the Netflix series Stranger Things in his early teens.

== Career ==
Bushnell gained early recognition for his role as Bobby Cañero-Reed in the Disney+ series Diary of a Future President (2020–2021), in which he portrayed a supporting character across multiple seasons.

In 2024, Bushnell landed his first voice acting role in Peacock's In The Know.

Starting from 2023, Bushnell stars as Luke Castellan in the Disney+ fantasy series Percy Jackson and the Olympians, an adaptation of the novel series by Rick Riordan.

He has spoken about his interest in music, learning instruments and playing "Iron Man" by Black Sabbath.

Bushnell voiced the character Rylee Lawson in Star Wars: Maul – Shadow Lord.

== Filmography ==
=== Television ===
Year	Title	Role	Notes
2020–2021	Diary of a Future President	Bobby Cañero-Reed	20 episodes
2023–2026	Percy Jackson and the Olympians	Luke Castellan	12 episodes
2024	In the Know	Chase	Voice; 6 episodes
2026	Star Wars: Maul – Shadow Lord	Rylee Lawson	Voice; 8 episodes
