= Leah Jeffries =

American actress (born 2009)

Leah Sava Jeffries
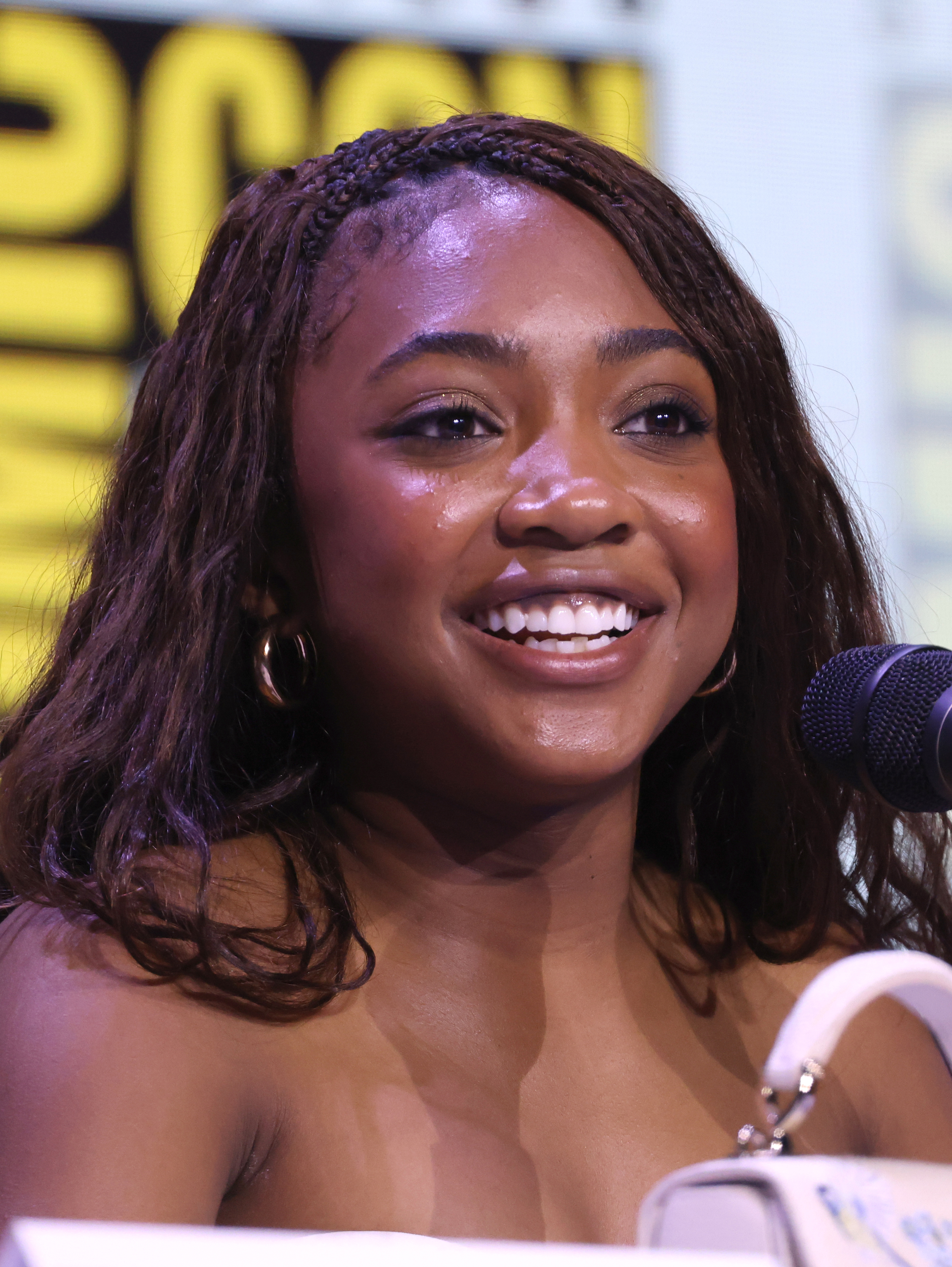
- Jeffries in 2025
- Born: Leah Sava Jeffries; September 25, 2009 (age 17); Detroit, Michigan, U.S.
- Occupations: Actress and model
- Years active: 2014–present

Leah Sava Jeffries (/sə.ˈveɪ/; born September 25, 2009) is an American actress. Jeffries made her acting debut on the American musical drama, Empire (2015) and later her feature film debut in the action-thriller Beast (2022). In 2022, Jeffries was cast as Annabeth Chase in the television adaptation of Rick Riordan's fantasy novel series, Percy Jackson & the Olympians, which earned her three NAACP Image Awards, along with a nomination for the Children's and Family Emmy Award for Outstanding Younger Performer.

== Early life ==
Jeffries was born on September 25, 2009, in Detroit, Michigan, to Leah Jeffries and Floyd S. Jeffries Jr. She has an older brother, Floyd Jeffries, who is also an actor and model. She attended school in the Novi Community School District.

== Career ==
Prior to her acting debut, Jeffries worked as a model for children's products for Carol's Daughter. Jeffries's acting debut was at age five as Lola Lyon on Empire.

On May 5, 2022, Jeffries was announced as Annabeth Chase in Percy Jackson and the Olympians. Immediately following the casting announcement, Jeffries received harassment online because she was African-American, while her character, Annabeth Chase, was portrayed as white in the book series the show was based on. On May 10, the books' author, Rick Riordan, posted a blog post in which he condemned the backlash against Jeffries and reaffirmed his support of her. Alexandra Daddario, the actress who played Annabeth in the two movie adaptations, also posted support for Jeffries online. Members of the fanbase who supported Jeffries's casting posted support online with the hashtag #LeahIsOurAnnabeth.

In August 2022, the film Beast was released, in which Jeffries played Norah Samuels. Later that year, Something from Tiffany's, in which Jeffries played Daisy Greene, was released.

== Filmography ==
=== Film ===
Year	Project	Role	Notes	Ref.
2019	PawParazzi	Monique		
2022	Beast	Norah Samuels		
2022	Something from Tiffany's	Daisy Greene		

=== Television ===
Year	Project	Role	Notes	Ref.
2015–2016	Empire	Lola Lyon	Recurring role; 6 episodes	
2018	Faith Under Fire	Fiona	TV Movie	
2018–2019	Rel	Brandi	11 episodes	
2023–present	Percy Jackson and the Olympians	Annabeth Chase	Main Role	
2027	The Cheetah Girls: Next Gen	Faith	TV Movie	

== Awards and nominations ==
Year	Award	Category	Work	Result	Ref.
2024	NAACP Image Awards	Outstanding Performance by a Youth (Series, Special, Television Movie or Limited-series)	Percy Jackson and the Olympians	Won	
2024	Séries em Cena Awards	Best Actress in an International Series	Percy Jackson and the Olympians	Nominated	
2024	BET Awards	BET YoungStars Award	Percy Jackson and the Olympians	Nominated	
2025	NAACP Image Awards	Outstanding Performance by a Youth (Series, Special, Television Movie or Limited-Series)	Percy Jackson and the Olympians	Won	
2025	Children's and Family Emmy Awards	Outstanding Younger Performer in a Preschool, Children's or Young Teen Program	Percy Jackson and the Olympians	Nominated	
2026	NAACP Image Awards	Outstanding Performance by a Youth (Series, Special, Television Movie or Limited-Series)	Percy Jackson and the Olympians	Won	
