= Theakston Old Peculier Crime Novel of the Year Award =

British crime fiction award

The Theakston Old Peculier Crime Novel of the Year Award is one of the UK's top crime-fiction awards, sponsored by Theakston's Old Peculier. It is awarded annually at Harrogate Crime Writing Festival in the UK, held every July, as part of the Harrogate International Festivals. The winner receives £3000 and a small hand-carved oak beer cask carved by one of Britain's last coopers. Novels eligible are those crime novels published in paperback any time during the previous year. Voting is by the public with decisions of a jury-panel also taken into account, a fact not-much publicised by the award organisers, who are keen to emphasise the public-voting aspect of the award.

== Recipients ==
Award winners and nominees
Year	Author	Title	Result	Ref.
2005	Mark Billingham	Lazybones	Winner	
2005	Andrew Taylor	The American Boy	Shortlist	
2005	Val McDermid	The Distant Echo	Shortlist	
2005	Simon Kernick	The Murder Exchange	Shortlist	
2005	Ian Rankin	A Question of Blood	Shortlist	
2005	Minette Walters	Disordered Minds	Shortlist	
2006	Val McDermid	The Torment of Others	Winner	
2006	Martin Edwards	The Coffin Trail	Shortlist	
2006	Susan Hill	The Various Haunts of Men	Shortlist	
2006	Ian Rankin	Fleshmarket Close	Shortlist	
2006	Stephen Booth	One Last Breath	Shortlist	
2006	Lindsay Ashford	Strange Blood	Shortlist	
2007	Allan Guthrie	Two-Way Split	Winner	
2007	Stephen Booth	The Dead Place	Shortlist	
2007	Michael Jecks	The Death Ship of Dartmouth	Shortlist	
2007	Christopher Brookmyre	All Fun and Games Until Somebody Loses an Eye	Shortlist	
2007	Graham Hurley	Blood and Honey	Shortlist	
2007	Stuart MacBride	Cold Granite	Shortlist	
2008	Stef Penney	The Tenderness of Wolves	Winner	
2008	Alexander McCall Smith	Blue Shoes and Happiness	Shortlist	
2008	Mark Billingham	Buried	Shortlist	
2008	Stuart MacBride	Dying Light	Shortlist	
2008	Peter James	Not Dead Enough	Shortlist	
2008	Graham Hurley	One Under	Shortlist	
2008	Peter Robinson	Piece of My Heart	Shortlist	
2008	Simon Kernick	Relentless	Shortlist	
2008	C.J. Sansom	Sovereign	Shortlist	
2008	Simon Beckett	The Chemistry of Death	Shortlist	
2008	Reginald Hill	The Death of Dalzeil	Shortlist	
2008	Christopher Brookmyre	A Tale Etched in Blood and Hard Black Pencil	Shortlist	
2009	Mark Billingham	Death Message	Winner	
2009	Tom Cain	The Accident Man	Shortlist	
2009	Declan Hughes	The Colour of Blood	Shortlist	
2009	Reginald Hill	A Cure for All Diseases	Shortlist	
2009	Lee Child	Bad Luck and Trouble	Shortlist	
2009	Val McDermid	Beneath the Bleeding	Shortlist	
2009	Stuart MacBride	Broken Skin	Shortlist	
2009	Peter James	Dead Man's Footsteps	Shortlist	
2009	Ian Rankin	Exit Music	Shortlist	
2009	Peter Robinson	Friend of the Devil	Shortlist	
2009	David Hewson	Garden of Evil	Shortlist	
2009	John Harvey	Gone to Ground	Shortlist	
2009	Mo Hayder	Ritual	Shortlist	
2009	Chris Simms	Savage Moon	Shortlist	
2010	R. J. Ellory	A Simple Act of Violence	Winner	
2010	Elly Griffiths	The Crossing Places	Shortlist	
2010	Tania Carver	The Surrogate	Shortlist	
2010	Tom Rob Smith	Child 44	Shortlist	
2010	Peter James	Dead Tomorrow	Shortlist	
2010	Ian Rankin	Doors Open	Shortlist	
2010	Brian McGilloway	Gallows Lane	Shortlist	
2010	Mark Billingham	In the Dark	Shortlist	
2011	Lee Child	61 Hours	Winner	
2011	Andrew Taylor	The Anatomy of Ghosts	Shortlist	
2011	William Ryan	The Holy Thief	Shortlist	
2011	S. J. Bolton	Blood Harvest	Shortlist	
2011	Stuart MacBride	Dark Blood	Shortlist	
2011	Mark Billingham	From the Dead	Shortlist	
2012	Denise Mina	The End of the Wasp Season	Winner	
2012	John Connolly	The Burning Soul	Shortlist	
2012	S. J. Watson	Before I Go to Sleep	Shortlist	
2012	Steve Mosby	Black Flowers	Shortlist	
2012	S. J. Bolton	Now You See Me	Shortlist	
2012	Christopher Brookmyre	Where the Bodies are Buried	Shortlist	
2013	Denise Mina	Gods and Beasts	Winner	
2013	Stav Sherez	A Dark Redemption	Shortlist	
2013	Peter May	The Lewis Man	Shortlist	
2013	Mark Billingham	Rush of Blood	Shortlist	
2013	Chris Ewan	Safe House	Shortlist	
2013	Stuart Neville	Stolen Souls	Shortlist	
2014	Belinda Bauer	Rubbernecker	Winner	
2014	Peter May	The Chess Men	Shortlist	
2014	Denise Mina	The Red Road	Shortlist	
2014	Malcolm Mackay	Death of Lewis Winter	Shortlist	
2014	Elly Griffiths	Dying Fall	Shortlist	
2014	Stav Sherez	Eleven Days	Shortlist	
2015	Sarah Hilary	Someone Else's Skin	Winner	
2015	Ray Celestin	The Axeman’s Jazz	Shortlist	
2015	Antonia Hodgson	The Devil in the Marshalsea	Shortlist	
2015	Belinda Bauer	The Facts of Life and Death	Shortlist	
2015	Elly Griffiths	The Outcast Dead	Shortlist	
2015	Peter May	Entry Island	Shortlist	
2016	Clare Mackintosh	I Let You Go	Winner	
2016	Robert Galbraith	Career of Evil	Shortlist	
2016	Renee Knight	Disclaimer	Shortlist	
2016	Adrian McKinty	Rain Dogs	Shortlist	
2016	Eva Dolan	Tell No Tales	Shortlist	
2016	Mark Billingham	Time of Death	Shortlist	
2017	Christopher Brookmyre	Black Widow	Winner	
2017	Eva Dolan	After You Die	Shortlist	
2017	Sabine Durrant	Lie with Me	Shortlist	
2017	Susie Steiner	Missing, Presumed	Shortlist	
2017	Val McDermid	Out of Bounds	Shortlist	
2017	Mick Herron	Real Tigers	Shortlist	
2018	Stav Sherez	The Intrusions	Winner	
2018	Denise Mina	The Long Drop	Shortlist	
2018	Abir Mukherjee	A Rising Man	Shortlist	
2018	Val McDermid	Insidious Intent	Shortlist	
2018	Susie Steiner	Persons Unknown	Shortlist	
2018	Mick Herron	Spook Street	Shortlist	
2019	Steve Cavanagh	Thirteen	Winner	
2019	Liam McIlvanney	The Quaker	Shortlist	
2019	Val McDermid	Broken Ground	Shortlist	
2019	Khurrum Rahman	East of Hounslow	Shortlist	
2019	Mick Herron	London Rules	Shortlist	
2019	Belinda Bauer	Snap	Shortlist	
2020	Adrian McKinty	The Chain	Winner	
2020	Jane Harper	The Lost Man	Shortlist	
2020	Mick Herron	Joe Country	Shortlist	
2020	Oyinkan Braithwaite	My Sister, the Serial Killer	Shortlist	
2020	Abir Mukherjee	Smoke and Ashes	Shortlist	
2020	Helen Fitzgerald	Worst Case Scenario	Shortlist	
2021	Chris Whitaker	We Begin at the End	Winner	
2021	Elly Griffiths	The Lantern Men	Shortlist	
2021	Brian McGilloway	The Last Crossing	Shortlist	
2021	Trevor Wood	The Man on the Street	Shortlist	
2021	Rosamund Lupton	The Three Hours	Shortlist	
2021	Abir Mukherjee	Death in the East	Shortlist	
2022	Mick Herron	Slough House	Winner	
2022	Laura Shepherd-Robinson	Daughters of Night	Shortlist	
2022	Vaseem Khan	Midnight at Malabar House	Shortlist	
2022	Will Dean	The Last Thing to Burn	Shortlist	
2022	Elly Griffiths	The Night Hawks	Shortlist	
2022	Joseph Knox	True Crime Story	Shortlist	
2023	M. W. Craven	The Botanist	Winner	
2023	Fiona Cummins	Into the Dark	Shortlist	
2023	Elly Griffiths	The Locked Room	Shortlist	
2023	Doug Johnstone	Black Hearts	Shortlist	
2023	Gillian McAllister	Wrong Place, Wrong time	Shortlist	
2023	Ruth Ware	The It Girl	Shortlist	
2024	Jo Callaghan	In the Blink of an Eye	Winner	
2024	Mark Billingham	The Last Dance	Shortlist	
2024	Mick Herron	The Secret Hours	Shortlist	
2024	William Hussey	Killing Jericho	Shortlist	
2024	Lisa Jewell	None of This is True	Shortlist	
2024	Liz Nugent	Strange Sally Diamond	Shortlist	
2025	Abir Mukherjee	Hunted	Winner	
2025	Chris Brookmyre	The Cracked Mirror	Shortlist	
2025	M W Craven	The Mercy Chair	Shortlist	
2025	Elly Griffiths	The Last Word	Shortlist	
2025	Marie Tierney	Deadly Animals	Shortlist	
2025	Chris Whitaker	All the Colours of the Dark	Shortlist	

== Outstanding Contribution ==
Year	Author	Result	Ref.
2022	Michael Connelly	Awarded	
2023	Ann Cleeves	Awarded	
2024	Martina Cole	Awarded	
