= Carol Jordan =

Carol Jordan may refer to:

- Inspector Carol Jordan, a character from the series Wire in the Blood played by Hermione Norris
- Inspector Carol Jordan, a character from the book, Beneath the Bleeding, basis for the series Wire in the Blood
- Carol Jordan, a victim of spree killer Philip John Smith

== See also ==
- Carole Jordan (1941–2026), British physicist, astrophysicist, astronomer and academic
