= Beneath the Bleeding =

2007 crime novel by Val McDermid

- First edition
- Author: Val McDermid
- Language: English
- Series: Dr. Tony Hill
- Release number: 5
- Genre: Detective fiction
- Publisher: HarperCollins
- Publication date: 2007
- Publication place: United Kingdom
- Media type: Print, eBook
- Pages: 404
- ISBN: 9780007243266
- OCLC: 85897662
- Preceded by: The Torment of Others
- Followed by: Fever of the Bone

Beneath The Bleeding (2007) is a crime novel by Scottish author Val McDermid, the fifth featuring her recurring protagonist, Dr. Tony Hill and his police partner Carol Jordan. The books were successfully adapted into the television series Wire in the Blood., starring Robson Green and Hermione Norris.

The title is part of a line from the poem East Coker by T. S. Eliot (part of the Four Quartets).

== Plot summary ==
After the footballer Robbie Bishop is poisoned with ricin Tony Hill investigates other pupils who went to his school, achieved success, then were suddenly poisoned. After the deaths of Danny Wade who won the lottery and Tom Cross who won the pools the killer is caught before he can kill the police officer Kevin Matthews, who owns a Ferrari. Tony then confronts Jack Andeson with the evidence that he's poisoning men from his school who achieved his teenage goals because he caught AIDS from a gay man and could no longer achieve them. Jack confesses to the murders to avoid a trial and to hide when he killed these men.
