= Tarlair Swimming Pool =

Swimming pool in Aberdeenshire, Scotland

Coordinates: 57.671°N 2.470°W

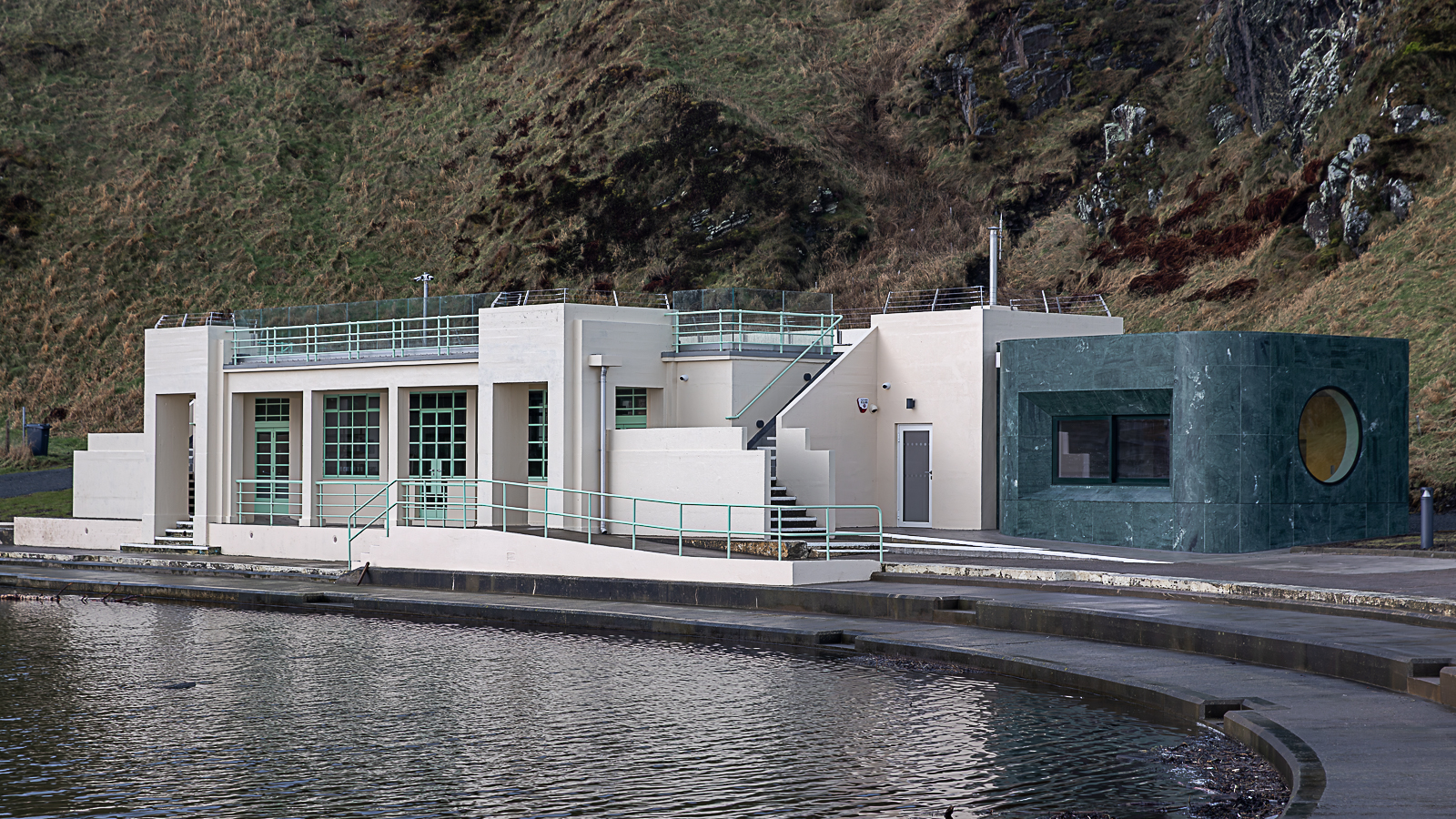
The Tarlair Pavilion Today

Tarlair Swimming Pool is a lido at the base of a sea cliff just outside Macduff in Aberdeenshire in Scotland. This outdoor swimming complex was built in an Art Deco style with a main building backing onto the cliffs and changing rooms to its left hand side. It is considered by Historic Environment Scotland to be the best example of only three surviving outdoor seaside pools in Scotland, the others being at Stonehaven and Gourock.

The design of the pool was a clever use of pumped sea water to fill the pools, and flooding of the main pool at high tide to flush out the old water. The main pool had a diving board at the deep end and a child's chute at the shallow end, though both are now missing. The second-largest pool was a boating pool with the two remaining pools being paddling pools.

The complex is now in the process of being repaired with the help of Friends of Tarlair.

Channel 4 television made "Tarlair Outdoor Pool" the subject of the third episode of a series of six documentary films on "Britain's Abandoned Playgrounds". The site also features in the Stuart MacBride novel, "The Missing and the Dead", when a child's body is found in the pool.

== History ==
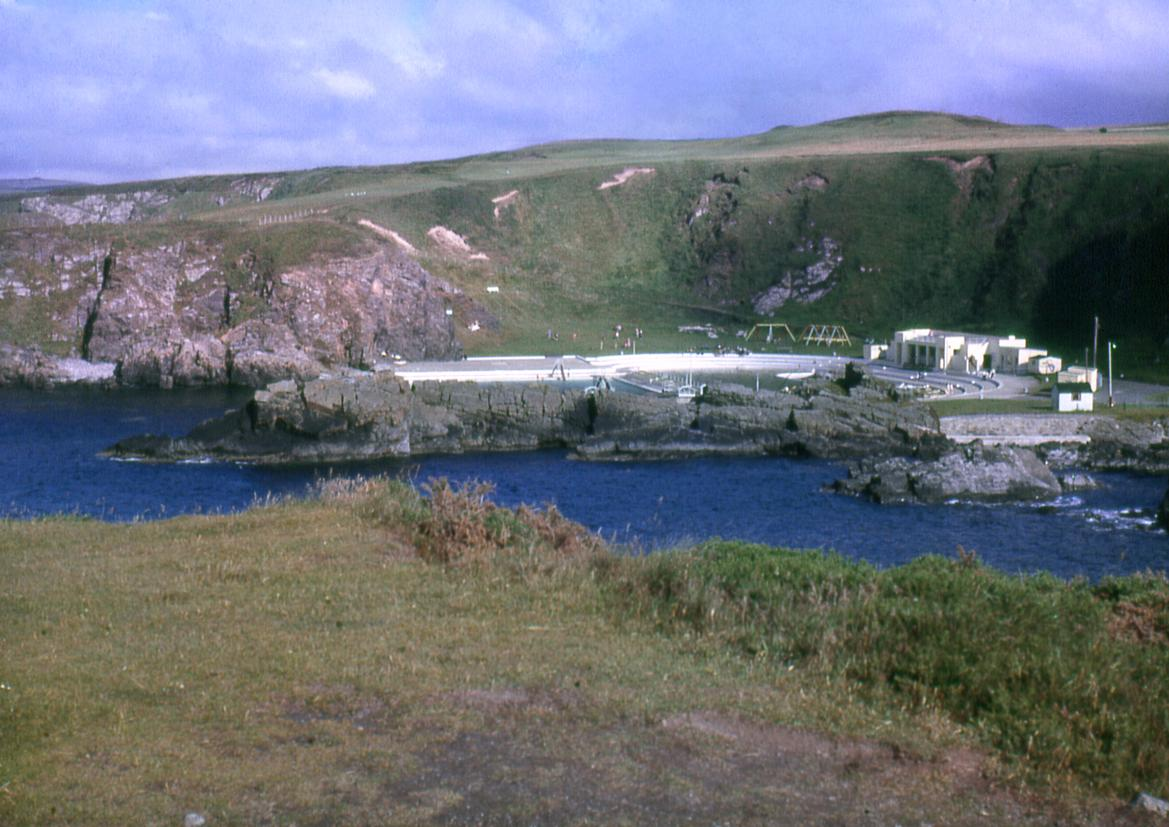
Picture of the pool in the 1960s

The pool was commissioned by Macduff Burgh Council in 1929, with the architect being John C Miller, the Burgh Surveyor of MacDuff. The contractor for the project was Robert Morrison & Son of Macduff. The pool operated from 1931 until the mid-1990s.

Between 1985 and 1994 Tarlair Swimming Pool was used as an open air concert arena where bands like Jethro Tull, Runrig and Wet Wet Wet played.

Since 2007 it has been protected as a category A listed building.

In 2010, a proposal was put forward for redevelopment of the complex as a lobster hatchery. The plans were never realised.

A "Friends of Tarlair" group was formed in 2012. There were proposals from Aberdeenshire Council to fill some or all of the pool, but this was thrown out in January 2013. Later that year, councillors agreed to contribute £300,000 towards refurbishing the pool. In 2020 the Friends of Tarlair organisation had a formal application to Aberdeenshire Council to have ownership of Tarlair Swimming Pool transferred over to the group accepted.

== Renovation of Tarlair ==
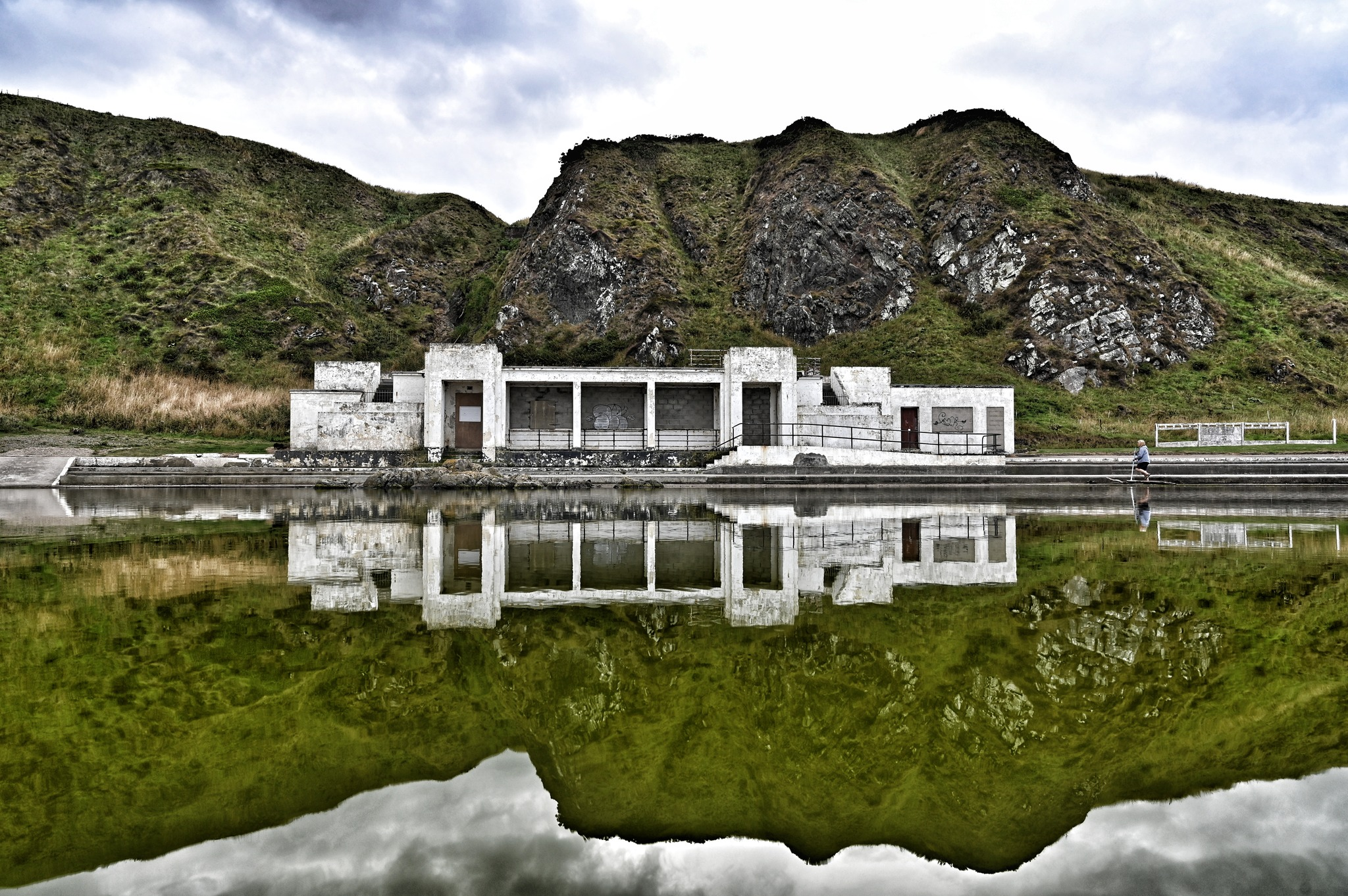
Main Building before renovations

Renovations began in 2014 with work on the Boating Pool and terraces. Then in May 2023 work started on the buildings.

For now the boating pool is landlocked and will be until the big pool is done and the whole wave replenished system is working again.

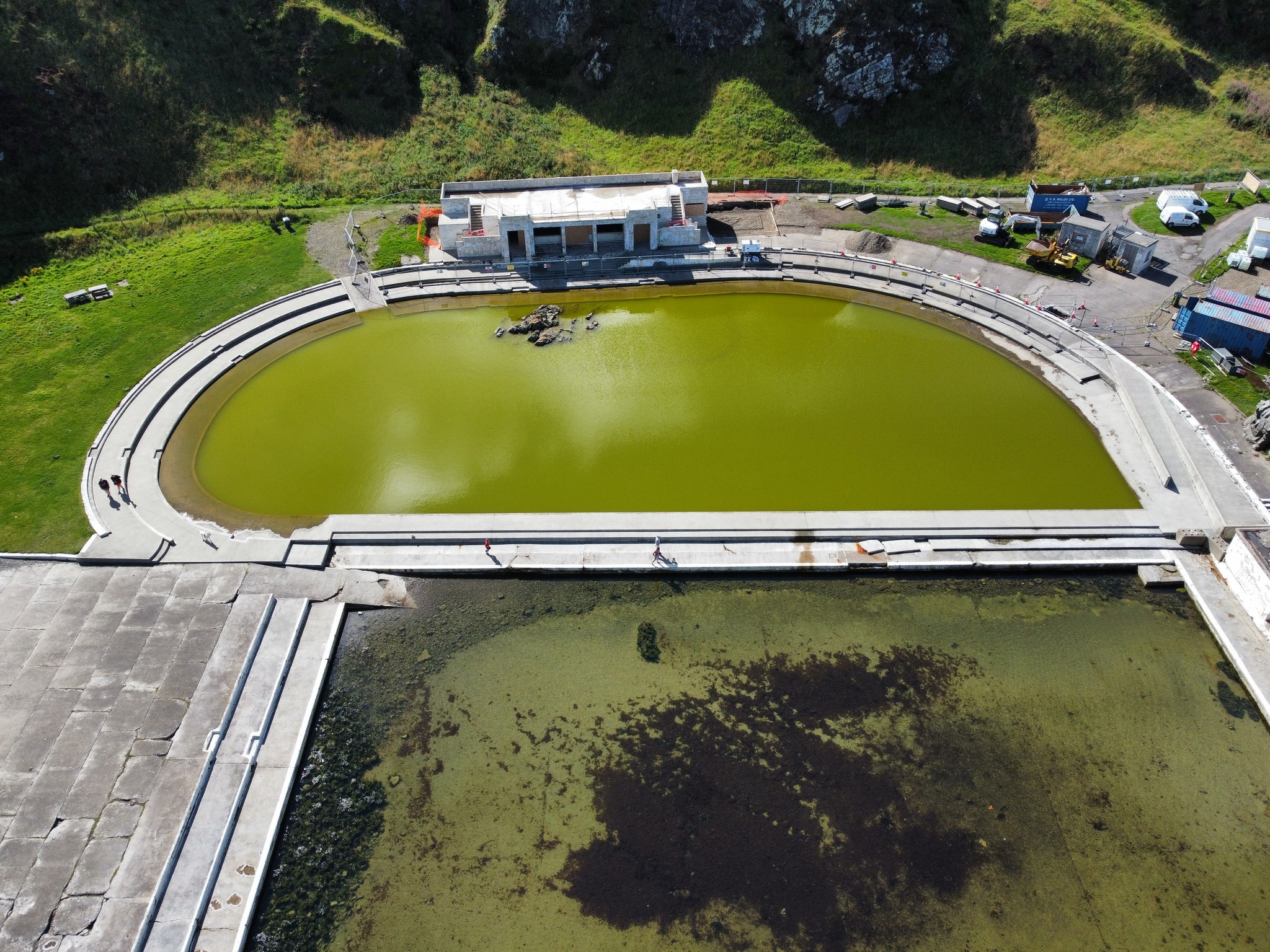
A wee drone photie o Tarlair

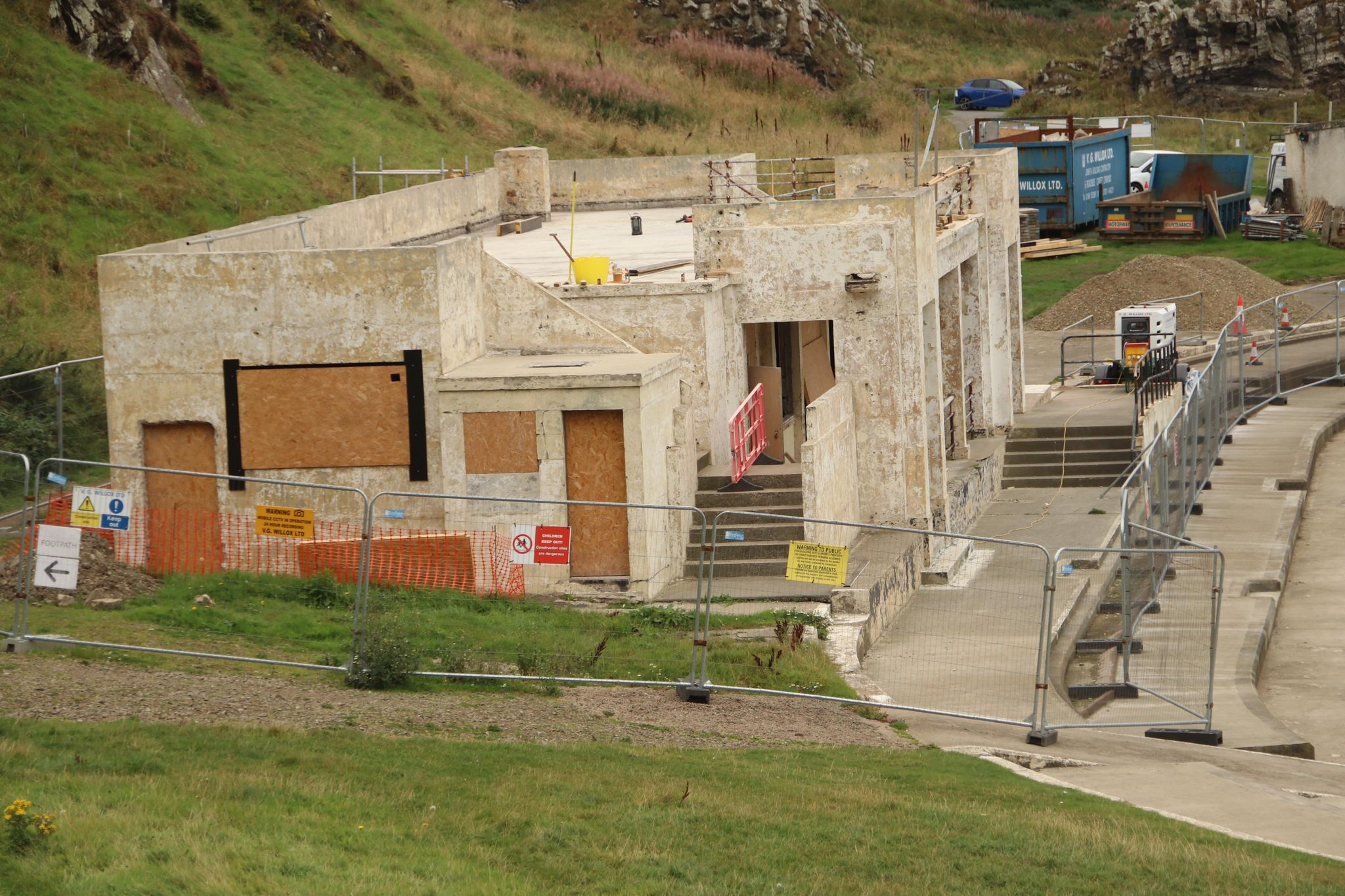

== Renovation Work images ==
A collection of Photies of the Refurbishment

These are two gifs of events that have happened at Tarlair. Click on them to see more images.
