= Close to the Bone =

Close to the Bone may refer to:

- Close to the Bone (Thompson Twins album), 1987
- Close to the Bone (Tom Tom Club album), 1983
- Close to the Bone (novel), a 2013 Logan McRae novel by Stuart MacBride
- "Close to the Bone", a song in the 2026 Armored Saint album Emotion Factory Reset

== See also ==
- Closer to the Bone, a 2009 album by Kris Kristofferson
