= List of fictional medical examiners =

This list consists of fictional medical examiners from various works of literature, films, video game, and television series, in order of their show/book debut.

Character	Actor	Creator	Debut
Dr. John Thorndyke		R. Austin Freeman	The Red Thumb Mark (1907–1942)
Professor Craig Kennedy		Arthur B. Reeve	Cosmopolitan (1910–1918)
Dr. Reginald Fortune		H. C. Bailey	Call Mr. Fortune (1919)
Dr. Priestley		John Rhode	The Paddington Mystery (1925–1961)
Dr. Basil Willing		Helen McCloy	Dance of Death (1938–2003)
Professor John Hardy	Marius Goring	Gerard Glaister	The Expert (TV series) (1968–1976)
Dr. Robert Asten	John S. Ragin	Glen A. Larson & Lou Shaw	Quincy, M.E. (1976–1983)
Dr. Emily Hanover	Anita Gillette	Steve Greenberg & Aubrey Solomon	Quincy, M.E. (1976–1983)
Dr. R. Quincy	Jack Klugman	Glen A. Larson & Lou Shaw	Quincy, M.E. (1976–1983)
Daphne Matthews		Ridley Pearson	Undercurrents (1988)
Dr. Kay Scarpetta		Patricia Cornwell	Postmortem (1990–)
Dr. Elizabeth Rodgers	Leslie Hendrix	Dick Wolf	Law & Order (1990–2010); Law & Order: Special Victims Unit (1999–2000); Law & Order: Criminal Intent (2001–2011)
Dr. Julianna Cox	Michelle Forbes	Lyle Weldon & Emily Whitesell	Homicide: Life on the Street (1993–1999)
Dr. Eddie "Fitz" Fitzgerald	Robbie Coltrane	Jimmy McGovern	Cracker (1993–1996, 2006)
Dr. Jane Halifax	Rebecca Gibney	Mac Gudgeon	Halifax f.p. (1994–2001)
Dr. Li Morris		Nora Roberts	in Death (1995–)
Dr. Tony Hill		Val McDermid	The Mermaids Singing (1995–)
Dr. Laura Hobson	Clare Holman		The Way Through the Woods (1995–)
Professor Sam Ryan	Amanda Burton	Nigel McCrery	Silent Witness (1996–2004)
Dr. Laurel Weaver/Agent L	Linda Fiorentino	Barry Sonnenfeld	Men in Black (1997)
Dr. Melinda Warner	Tamara Tunie	Judith McCreary	Law & Order: Special Victims Unit (2000–2018?)
Dr. Felix Gibson	Esther Hall	Barbara Machin	Waking the Dead (2000–2011)
Dr. Eve Lockhart	Tara Fitzgerald	Barbara Machin	Waking the Dead (2000–2011)
Dr. Frankie Wharton	Holly Aird	Barbara Machin	Waking the Dead (2000–2011)
Dr. Al Robbins	Robert David Hall	Anthony Zuiker	CSI: Crime Scene Investigation (2000–2015)
Dr. David Phillips	David Berman	Anthony Zuiker	CSI: Crime Scene Investigation (2000–2015)
Dr. Jordan Cavanaugh	Jill Hennessy	Tim Kring	Crossing Jordan (2001–2007)
Dr. Garret Macy	Miguel Ferrer	Tim Kring	Crossing Jordan (2001–2007)
Dr. Mahesh "Bug" Vijay	Ravi Kapoor	Tim Kring	Crossing Jordan (2001–2007)
Dr. Trey Sanders	Mahershalalhashbaz Ali	Tim Kring	Crossing Jordan (2001–2007)
Dr. Elaine Duchamps	Lorraine Toussaint	Tim Kring	Crossing Jordan (2001–2007)
Dr. Peter Winslow	Ivan Sergei	Tim Kring	Crossing Jordan (2001–2007)
Dr. Kate Switzer	Brooke Smith	Tim Kring	Crossing Jordan (2001–2007)
Dr. Alexx Woods	Khandi Alexander	Anthony Zuiker	CSI: Miami (2002–2012)
Dr. Randall Frazier	Erik Dellums	David Simon	The Wire (2002–2008)
Dr. Waldo Butters	Matt Gordon	Jim Butcher	Death Masks (2003)
Gerald Jackson	Pancho Demmings	Donald P. Bellisario & Don McGill	NCIS (2003–)
Dr. Donald "Ducky" Mallard	David McCallum (2003-2023)	Donald P. Bellisario & Don McGill	NCIS (2003–)
Jimmy Palmer	Brian Dietzen	Donald P. Bellisario & Don McGill	NCIS (2003–)
Tru Davies	Eliza Dushku	Jon Harmon Feldman	Tru Calling (2003–2005)
Dr. Sheldon Hawkes	Hill Harper	Anthony Zuiker	CSI: NY (2004–2013)
Dr. Sid Hammerback	Robert Joy	Anthony Zuiker	CSI: NY (2004–2013)
Dr. Sam Koo	Frankie Lam	Mui Siu-ching	Forensic Heroes (2006–)
Dr. "Woody" Strode	Kurt Fuller	Steve Franks	Psych (2006–2014)
Dr. Camille Saroyan	Tamara Taylor	Hart Hanson	Bones (2006–2017)
Dr. Asagao Yamada	Juri Ueno	Masahito Kagawa	Medical Examiner Asagao (2006–2022)
Henry Silver	Mark L. Taylor		Saving Grace (2007–2010)
Yang Qiu-chi	Sun Jian	Mu Yi	Legend of the Concubinage (2007–2016)
Dr. Julia Ogden	Hélène Joy	Maureen Jennings	Murdoch Mysteries (2008–)
Dr. Emily Grace	Georgina Reilly	Maureen Jennings	Murdoch Mysteries (2008–)
Dr. Lanie Parish	Tamala Jones	Andrew W. Marlowe	Castle (2009–2016)
Dr. Sidney Perlmutter	Arye Gross	Andrew W. Marlowe	Castle (2009–2016)
Dr. Maura Isles	Sasha Alexander	Tess Gerritsen	Rizzoli & Isles (2010–2016)
Dr. Jin-woo Han	Ryu Deok-hwan	Park Jae-beom	Quiz of God (2010–2019)
Dr. Max Bergman	Masi Oka	Peter M. Lenkov, Alex Kurtzman & Roberto Orci	Hawaii Five-0 (2010–)
Dr. Curtis Brumfield	Windell Middlebrooks	Christopher Murphey	Body of Proof (2011–2013)
Dr. Ethan Gross	Geoffrey Arend	Christopher Murphey	Body of Proof (2011–2013)
Dr. Megan Hunt	Dana Delany	Christopher Murphey	Body of Proof (2011–2013)
Dr. Kate Murphy	Jeri Ryan	Christopher Murphey	Body of Proof (2011–2013)
Dr. Mike Collins	Mark Baezely	Barbara Machin	The Body Farm (2011)
Dr. Rosa Gilbert	Wunmi Mosaku	Barbara Machin	The Body Farm (2011)
Dr. Eve Lockart	Tara Fitzgerald	Barbara Machin	The Body Farm (2011)
Dr. Oscar "Oggy" Traynor	Finlay Robertson	Barbara Machin	The Body Farm (2011)
Dr. Malcom Carruthers	Andy Umberger	Rockstar Games	LA Noire (2011)
Dr. Yoon Ji-hoon	Park Shin-yang	Jang Hang-jun & Kim Eun-hee	Sign (2011)
Dr. Tamami Ōdate	Makiko Esumi	Atsuko Hashibe	Bull Doctor (2011)
Dr. Qin Ming	Zhang Ruoyun, Liu Dongqin, Jing Chao, Zhang Yao & Yan Kuan	Qin Ming	Medical Examiner Dr. Qin (2012–)
Dr. Betty Rogers	Lauren Holly	Daniel Cerone	Motive (2013–2016)
Dr. Mao Matsumoto	Emi Takei	Shizuka Ōishi	Truth of Zero (2014)
Dr. Loretta Wade	C. C. H. Pounder	Gary Glasberg	NCIS: New Orleans (2014–)
Dr. Henry Morgan	Ioan Gruffudd	Matt Miller	Forever (2014–2015)
Dr. Yang Pai-chuan	Lu-Hao Chu	Yu Shang-min	Sunset (2015)
Dr. Ravi Chakrabarti	Rahul Kohli		iZombie (2015–)
Olivia "Liv" Moore	Rose McIver		iZombie (2015–)
Rose Schwartz	Kathleen Rose Perkins	Shane Brennan	NCIS: Los Angeles (2009–)
Dr. Naomi Kimishima	Kirsten Potter	Atlus	Trauma Team (2010)
Ji-xue	Chen Bing	Tian Ran & Hu Qi-xia	Forensic Intern (2017)
Dr. Mikoto Misumi	Satomi Ishihara	Akiko Nogi	Unnatural (2018)
Dr. Baek Beom	Jung Jae-young	Min Ji-eun	Partners for Justice (2018–)
Dr. Jenny Cooper	Serinda Swan	Morwyn Brebner (for television)	Coroner (2019–2022)
Dr. Daniel Harrow	Ioan Gruffudd	Stephen M. Irwin & Leigh McGrath	Harrow (2018–2021)
Dr. Takashi Yuzuki	Nao Ōmori	Jang Hang-jun & Kim Eun-hee	Sign (2019)
Dr. Yung Syueh-fung		Chien Chia-cheng	The Truth Beneath the Snow (2022–)
Unnamed	Da-her Lin	Cheng Wei-hao & Yin Chen-hao	GG Precinct (2024)
