= Fever of the Bone =

Book by Val McDermid

First edition

Fever of the Bone is a novel written by noted Scottish crime author Val McDermid. It was published by Little, Brown in Great Britain (2009) and HarperCollins for the United States and Canada (2010), and is the sixth novel in the series featuring psychologist Dr. Tony Hill and Detective Chief Inspector Carol Jordan. Several of the books in this series have been adapted into the television series Wire in the Blood, starring Robson Green as Tony Hill and Hermione Norris as Carol Jordan.

Like the other novels in the series, the title of this book is inspired by a poem written by T. S. Eliot. In this instance, the poem "Whispers of Immortality" provides the source, with the lines "No contact possible to flesh Allayed the fever of the bone."

== Plot ==
The story centers on the investigation of the murders of several teenagers who, at first, can only be connected by their use of the fictional social networking site RigMarole. Along the way, Carol has to deal with the pressures placed on her by new Chief Constable James Blake, which include an attempt to lower the costs of the investigation by using in-house profiling help instead of going to Dr. Hill. Tony, meanwhile, is dealing with a personal loss that forces him to re-examine several long-held beliefs.

== RigMarole social networking site ==
A tie-in version of the RigMarole website was launched by Little, Brown around the time that the novel was published in Great Britain, but is no longer available.

== Awards ==
- 2011, Barry Award for Best Paperback Novel
- 2011, Lambda Literary Award for Lesbian Mystery
