= M. W. Craven =

English writer

M.W. Craven
- Born: Mike Craven; 1968 (age 57–58); Carlisle, England, United Kingdom
- Occupation: Writer
- Writing career
- Period: 2015–present
- Genres: Fiction, crime, thriller
- Notable work: Washington Poe Series
- Website: www.mwcraven.com

Mike W. Craven (born 1968) is an English crime writer. He is the author of the Washington Poe series and the DI Avison Fluke series. In 2019 his novel The Puppet Show won the Crime Writers' Association Gold Dagger award.

== Biography ==
Craven was born in Carlisle and grew up in Newcastle. He joined the British Army at the age of 16. After two and a half years' training as an armourer, he spent 10 years travelling the world with the army. In 1995, he left the army and began a degree in social work, specialising in criminology, psychology, and substance misuse, before joining the Cumbria Probation Service in Whitehaven as a probation officer. After 16 years of service, with the rank of assistant chief executive, he accepted redundancy, and became a full-time author.

=== Awards ===
- 2013 CWA Debut Dagger shortlist for Born in a Burial Gown
- 2019 CWA Gold Dagger winner for The Puppet Show
- 2020 CWA Gold Dagger longlist for Black Summer
- 2021 CWA Gold Dagger longlist for The Curator
- 2022 CWA Ian Fleming Steel Dagger winner for Dead Ground
- 2023 CWA Ian Fleming Steel Dagger shortlist for The Botanist
- 2023 Theakston Old Peculier Crime Novel of the Year Award winner for The Botanist
- 2025 Sealed Room Club (Kyoto, Japan) Best Translated Mystery winner for The Botanist
- 2025 Theakston Old Peculier Crime Novel of the Year Award shortlist for The Mercy Chair
- 2025 Capital Crime Fingerprint Award for Overall Crime Novel of the Year Award winner for The Mercy Chair
- 2026 Capital Crime Fingerprint Award for Overall Crime Novel of the Year Award winner for The Final Vow

== Personal life ==
Craven lives in Carlisle with his wife, Joanne, and his springer spaniel, Bracken.

== Novels ==
=== Avison Fluke series ===
Order	Title	Year
1	Born in a Burial Gown	2015
2	Body Breaker	2017
Short stories	Assume Nothing, Believe Nobody, Challenge Everything	2015

=== Washington Poe series ===
Order	Title	Year
1	The Puppet Show	2018
2	Black Summer	2019
3	The Curator	2020
Short stories	Cut Short	2020
4	Dead Ground	2021
5	The Botanist	2022
Quick Reads Novella	The Cutting Season	2022
6	The Mercy Chair	2024
7	The Final Vow	2025
8	The Killers Mark	2026

=== Ben Koenig series ===
Order	Title	Year
1	Fearless	2023
2	Nobody's Hero	2024

=== The Royale Academy series ===
Order	Title	Year
1	James Bond and the Secret Agent Academy	2026

A new children's book series featuring a retired James Bond training the secret agents of tomorrow.

=== Reception ===
Craven's work has been well received in publications such as The Times, Woman & Home, Female First, Whispering Stories, and What's Good To Read
