= Now We Are Dead =

2017 novel by Stuart MacBride

- Author: Stuart MacBride
- Language: English
- Series: Logan 'Lazarus' McRae
- Genre: Crime fiction
- Set in: Aberdeen
- Publisher: HarperCollins
- English publication date: November 2017
- Pages: 380
- ISBN: 978-0-00-825708-8
- Preceded by: In the Cold Dark Ground
- Followed by: The Blood Road

Now We Are Dead is a spinoff novel from the bestselling Logan McRae series by Stuart MacBride. The novel features some of the usual characters from the series but McRae's character appears in only two scenes with the story revolving around Roberta Steel. The novel has been described as being "lighter" and "more fun than the violence and misery of MacBride's blacker thrillers".

== Plot ==
Detective Sergeant Roberta Steel has been recently demoted from detective chief inspector on account of her planting evidence of child abuse on the computer of a suspected rapist (Jack Wallace), and as a result, he was freed from his sentence. The story involves Steel and Detective Constable 'Tufty' Quirrel tackling shoplifting crimes in Aberdeen whilst she is still stalking Wallace and accusing him of a series of rapes. Towards the end of the novel, it is revealed that Wallace was guilty of some of the rapes as he was working in a team of three.

== Notes ==
- The novel is a "standalone spinoff" from MacBride's reselling Logan McRae series. At the end of the previous novel "In the Cold Dark Ground", it is revealed that McRae agrees to join Professional Standards and that Steel is arrested on suspicion of tampering with evidence.
- McRae appears in two scenes as a Detective Inspector.
- The novel was written after MacBride had appeared on and won, Celebrity Mastermind with a specialist subject of A. A. Milne. The story has titles that hark back to A. A. Milne's most famous work (Winnie the Pooh) and sees Steel and Tufty playing Poohsticks.
