= Close to the Bone (novel) =

2013 novel by Stuart MacBride

- Author: Stuart MacBride
- Language: English
- Series: Logan 'Lazarus' McRae
- Genre: Detective fiction
- Publisher: Orion
- Publication date: 2013
- Publication place: Scotland
- Media type: Print
- Pages: 511
- ISBN: 978-0-00-734426-0
- Preceded by: Shatter the Bones
- Followed by: The Missing and the Dead

Close to the Bone is the eighth instalment in the bestselling Detective Sergeant McRae series of crime novels from Stuart MacBride.

== Plot ==
Logan McRae is still living in a caravan, his girlfriend, Samantha, is still unresponsive and someone is leaving bones on his doorstep. Besides all this he has to cope with Detective Inspector Steel, a string of assaults and someone who is going around and Necklacing people. More murders follow and the filming of a novel about witchcraft seems to be inspiring the Necklacing murders. This leads to a confrontation with McRae's erstwhile boss, David Insch, ex DI from Grampian Police, who is now on the production team for the film.
