= Shatter the Bones =

2011 novel by Stuart MacBride

- Author: Stuart MacBride
- Language: English
- Release number: 7
- Subject: Logan 'Lazarus' McRae
- Set in: Aberdeen
- Publisher: HarperCollins
- Publication date: 2011
- Pages: 438
- ISBN: 978-0-00-734421-5
- Preceded by: Dark Blood
- Followed by: Close to the Bone

Shatter the Bones is the seventh book in the bestselling Logan McRae detective series set in Aberdeenshire by Stuart MacBride.

== Plot ==
Alison and Jenny McGregor have been kidnapped and are being ransomed for a very large sum of money. Because they have been appearing on the TV series "Britain's Next Big Star", the outpouring of grief is immense and public donations swell the ransom coffers to beyond £6 million. Elsewhere, McRae is trying to track down a drug dealer and his flat is subject to an arson attack. Whilst McRae and his girlfriend, Samantha, are escaping from the fire, a drainpipe Samantha is holding on to gives way, and she falls several feet to the ground. Medical staff put her into an induced coma.

== Reception ==
A review for "Shatter the Bones" in The Scotsman said;

Regular readers will not be disappointed, newcomers are advised not to venture beyond the hardcover unless accompanied by a responsible adult.

The Sunday Business Post said that "Shatter the Bones is sure to satisfy the many fans of MacBride's gritty prose and dry humour."
