= The Torment of Others =

Crime novel by Val McDermid

First edition (publ. HarperCollins)

The Torment of Others is a crime novel by Scottish author Val McDermid, and is the fourth entry in her popular Carol Jordan and Dr. Tony Hill series, which has been successfully adapted into the television series Wire in the Blood. The novel was shortlisted for the Crime Writers' Association Gold Dagger, and won the 2006 Theakston's Old Peculier Crime Novel of the Year Award. As with her other novels in the Tony Hill series, the title is an extract from a poem by T. S. Eliot.

== Plot summary ==
Several years after Derek Tyler was incarcerated for slaughtering several prostitutes, another lady of the night is found dead under similar modus operandi being vaginally penetrated using a dildo covered in razor blades. While Dr. Tony Hill tries to convince Derek Tyler to explain who the Voice is DCI Carol Jordan sets up a sting operation using Paula McIntyre. However the sting goes wrong and Paula is captured by the copycat killer Carl Mackenzie.

Carl rapes Paula, Carol and her team hunt for Paula, and Tony suspects that a police officer is controlling Derek and Carl as only someone involved with this sting could have sabotaged it. Tony confronts Sergeant Jan Shields, who has been using mind manipulation to make others kill because she's a control freak.

While this is happening Don Merrick goes to Scotland to capture the paedophilic child killer Nick Sanders but is killed by him. Nick is later arrested.

== Reception ==
The novel received generally positive reviews from literary critics. Entertainment Weekly gave The Torment of Others an "A-", calling it "smooth", "confident", and "deeply satisfying", with a plot "chock-full of creepy goodness" and "elegant manipulation". Library Journal rated the book as "highly recommended", commending McDermid for keeping the series interesting "through developing the relationships among the characters and providing nonstop action and edge-of-the-seat suspense". A review in The Guardian review concluded that "No one compares to McDermid when it comes to the deviant side of human nature".
