= Chris Simms (author) =

British writer

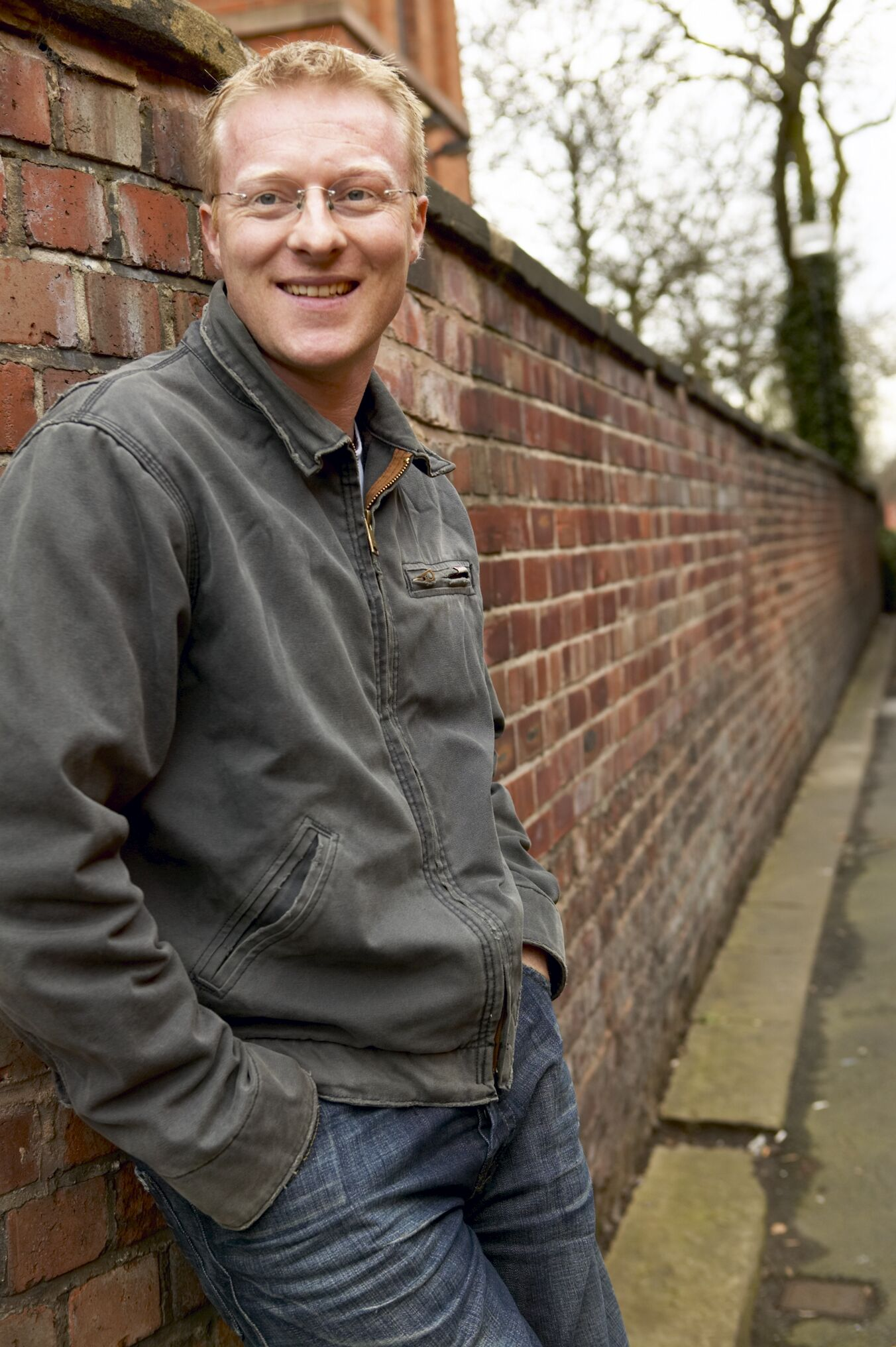
- Occupations: Crime Novelist, Copywriter
- Writing career
- Genre: Crime fiction
- Subjects: Crime, thriller, horror
- Website: chrissimms.info//

Chris Simms (born in 1969, in Horsham, West Sussex) is a British author of crime novels. He was educated at Christ's Hospital school, Horsham before graduated from Newcastle University and then travelling around the world. He then moved to Manchester in 1994 where he began writing. He is married with four children and lives in Stockport and as well as being the author of a number of works he is also a freelance copywriter.

== Awards and acknowledgements ==
Speaking in the Literary Review, Jessica Mann said Simms was one to watch after his debut novel.

His second novel Pecking Order was selected as a Best British Crime Novel by Deadly Pleasures magazine.

Killing the Beasts was named Best Crime Book for 2005 by Shots magazine.

In 2007, Simms was selected as a 'Waterstone's Author for the Future'.

Savage Moon was shortlisted for the 2009 Theakston's Old Peculier Crime Novel of the Year Award.

Manchester Confidential described Simms' writing as 'thoughtful and exciting crime fiction at its best'.

He has also been described as "one of the best of the new generation" by The Guardian.

In 2026, Simms was awarded the Red Herring Award from the Crime Writers' Association.

== Bibliography ==
=== DI Spicer series ===
- Killing the Beasts (2005)
- Shifting Skin (2006)
- Savage Moon (2007)
- Hell's Fire (2008)
- The Edge (2009)
- Cut Adrift (2010)
- Sleeping Dogs (2014)
- Death Games (2017)
- Dark Angel(2021)

=== DC Iona Khan series ===
- Scratch Deeper (2012)
- A Price to Pay (2013)

=== DC Sean Blake series ===
- Loose Tongues (2018)
- Marked Men (2019)

=== Other ===
- Outside the White Lines (2003)
- Pecking Order (2004)
- Sing Me to Sleep (2014)
- Rats' Nest (2015)
- Dead Gorgeous (2016)

=== Pecking Order ===
Largely set on a Cheshire battery farm, Pecking Order (2004) follows the naïve but cruel Rubble who is duped into believing that he's been enrolled as an agent on a sinister government project. Partly inspired by the 1960s experiments of Stanley Milgram into man's obedience to authority, the novel also touches on such diverse issues as euthanasia and the ethics of factory farming. It does so with 'intelligence and subtlety' according to The Bookseller and was selected as a 'Best British Crime Novel' for 2004 by Deadly Pleasures magazine. Simms then moved to the Orion Publishing Group.

=== Killing the Beasts ===
Killing the Beasts (2005) commences his series of thrillers set very firmly in Manchester. Lead character is Jon Spicer, a Detective Inspector in Greater Manchester Police's Major Incident Team. Descended from the Irish immigrants who helped build the world's first industrial city, DI Spicer never shies away from Manchester's violent and lawless corners during his investigations.

Killing the Beasts is set during 2002 with the city's hosting of that year's Commonwealth Games providing a backdrop to the action. The plot revolves around a killer who sedates his victims before suffocating them by blocking their airways with a mysterious gel. The novel was chosen by Shots Magazine as a 'Best Crime Book' for 2005. Its sequel, Shifting Skin (2006), sees DI Spicer tracking 'The Butcher of Belle Vue', a murderer who uses surgical skills to remove large swathes of his victims' flesh. The investigation ultimately leads Jon into the city's shady escort scene and the unscrupulous end of the cosmetic surgery industry. Shifting Skin was nominated for the Theakston's Crime Novel of the Year.

=== Savage Moon ===
Third in the series is Savage Moon (2007). Containing multiple references to the horror classic, 'An American Werewolf in London', the novel is concerned with a brutal killing that takes place on the notorious Saddleworth Moor, to the edge of the city. At first it's assumed a mysterious black cat that's been spotted prowling the wild terrain is responsible. But then more bodies start to appear, each one a little closer to the centre of the city itself. It was described by The Guardian. as 'an atmospheric, psychologically astute and emotionally literate study of the nature of predator and prey' and was shortlisted for the Theakston's Crime Novel of the Year.

=== Hell's Fire ===
Next in the series is Hell's Fire (2008), a thriller that looks at the role of religion in modern-day society. In it, Jon is charged with unravelling who is behind a spate of arson attacks on churches around Manchester. A city landmark that plays a part in the novel is the recently renovated Gorton Monastery. "...a persuasive, original plot... Next release is The Edge (2009). According to The Bookseller it is 'reputed to be his most powerful and personal novel yet'. The story follows Jon on a lonely quest to discover who murdered his younger brother and then dumped the dismembered body on top of a hill in the nearby Peak District National Park. The latest release in the DI Spicer series is Cut Adrift(2010). The story traces Jon's marital troubles interwoven with people trafficking, murder and the threat of international terrorism.
