= All That's Dead =

2019 novel by Stuart MacBride

- First edition
- Author: Stuart MacBride
- Language: English
- Series: Logan 'Lazarus' McRae
- Release number: 12
- Genre: Crime
- Set in: Aberdeenshire
- Published: 30 May 2019
- Publisher: Harper Collins
- Publication place: United Kingdom
- Media type: Hardback
- Pages: 437
- ISBN: 978-0-00-820826-4
- Preceded by: The Blood Road
- Followed by: This House of Burning Bones

All That's Dead is the twelfth novel in the bestselling Logan 'Lazarus' McRae series written by Stuart MacBride.

== Plot ==
An Englishman, who lectures at Aberdeen University, goes missing, with only spattered blood stains to indicate what might have happened. He was vociferous in his Unionism (especially on social media) and it is thought by Police Scotland that the Alt-Nats (Alternative Nationalists) have kidnapped him. Then at least two others go missing too. Amidst all this, Detective Inspector Logan McRae is back at work after having had a year off on sick leave (on account of his wounds from the last story The Blood Road). McRae, who is still in Professional Standards, is seconded to the investigation into the disappearances when it is revealed that the detective inspector leading the investigation, was in a Nationalist terror group when he was sixteen.

== Reception ==
MacBride acknowledged that the novel had an obvious theme; that of Scotland's Independence and the fight between the Nationalists and the Unionists. MacBride stated his thoughts on the matter, saying

Scotland is a really welcoming nation of people. If you choose to make your home in Scotland, we’re quite happy to call you Scottish, and yet there are still people who will treat the word ‘English’ as a four-letter word. It is bizarre that it seems to be an acceptable form of racism when in reality it is just old-fashioned Scottish bigotry.

Barry Forshaw, writing in the "Financial Times", commented on the Scottish Independence theme on the book and stated "...while the delivery of such elements in All That’s Dead may seem less compulsively nasty than previous outings for his rough-edged Aberdeen copper Logan McRae, readers should not be lured into a false sense of security."

Louise Fairbairn, writing in "The Scotsman", said "After last year’s superlative The Blood Road, I wondered what Stuart MacBride was going to do next. I needn’t have worried – All That’s Dead is a much slower burn, and a very different kind of case for Logan McRae, but it’s a satisfying read, and a hugely thoughtful novel to boot."

David Knights, writing in the Keighley News was very positive about the novel saying that the novel "is up there with the best of Logan’s previous outings."

On its first week of release, All That's Dead debuted at number 2 on the hardback book chart.
