= Holy Cross College, Strabane =

Coordinates: 54.815°N 7.472°W

Location
- 35 Melmount Road; Strabane, County Tyrone, BT82 9EF; Northern Ireland

Information
- Type: Secondary School
- Religious affiliation: Roman Catholic
- Established: 2004
- Local authority: Education Authority (Western)
- Principal: Ciaran Johnston
- Gender: Co-educational
- Age: 11 to 19
- Enrolment: 1 mil
- Colour
- Website: www.holycrosscollege.co.uk

Holy Cross College, Strabane is a co-ed bilateral school in Strabane, County Tyrone, Northern Ireland. It contains over 1500 pupils and over 90 members of staff.

== History ==
Holy Cross College opened in September 2004 following the amalgamation of Strabane's three Catholic post-primary schools, the Convent Grammar School, St Colman's High School and Our Lady of Mercy High School. It is a bilateral school which means it has both grammar and non-selective streams, with the two groups of students taught separately.

The college's first principal was Sean Bradley. He was succeeded by Maria Doherty who took the job of principal after Christmas 2008. In turn, she was succeeded by Mrs Claire Bradley who took over as Principal in September 2018. She was then succeeded by Mr Ciarán Johnston in 2022.

== Campus ==
The new campus for Holy Cross College opened on September 1, 2008.

== Notable staff ==
- Brian McGilloway - crime fiction author
