= A Dark So Deadly =

2017 novel by Stuart MacBride

A Dark so Deadly
- Author: Stuart MacBride
- Language: English
- Genre: Detective fiction
- Publisher: Harper Collins
- Publication date: April 2017
- Publication place: Scotland
- Media type: Print
- Pages: 596
- ISBN: 978-0-00-749468-2

A Dark so Deadly is a 2017 detective fiction novel written by Stuart MacBride. Set in the fictional town of Oldcastle, it follows the Misfit Mob - a detective unit of Scottish police made up of officers who were sidelined from mainstream cases for various reasons. Tasked with what is seemingly a case of theft of a mummy from a museum, they later find that the found body was the work of a serial killer who mummifies his victims. The story proceeds to chronicle their attempts to find the perpetrator.

While a standalone novel, the setting of Oldcastle and some of its characters are taken from two Ash Henderson novels (Birthdays for the Dead and A Song for the Dying).

== Plot ==
Detective Constable Callum MacGregor is in the Misfit Mob. The Misfit Mob is where Police Scotland deposit their outcasts, troublemakers, and those whom it wishes to get rid of but cannot. Callum is in the Misfit Mob because he had tampered with forensics at a crime scene, allowing a known killer to avoid conviction. Everyone is convinced he accepted a bribe from the killer to deliberately contaminate the scene. However, MacGregor didn't ruin the crime scene; it was his pregnant girlfriend, for whom MacGregor took the blame so she would not be sacked and lose her benefits.

As a member of the Misfit Mob, MacGregor contends with police finding his mum's remains (25 years after she went missing) and finding out that his long-lost twin brother is a serial killer who is mummifying his victims. The haiku-speaking sergeant in charge does not welcome MacGregor, and his supervisor is revealed to be the real father of MacGregor's child.
