= Brian McGilloway =

Author from Northern Ireland

Brian McGilloway (born 1974) is a crime fiction author from Derry, Northern Ireland.

== Biography ==
McGilloway was born in Derry where he attended St Columb's College. He then studied English at Queen's University Belfast, where he was very active in student theatre, winning a national Irish Student Drama Association award for theatrical lighting design in 1996. He is a former Head of English at St. Columb's College in Derry, but now teaches in Holy Cross College in Strabane.

McGilloway lives in Strabane with his wife and their four children.

== Writing ==
McGilloway's debut novel was a crime thriller called Borderlands. Borderlands was shortlisted for a Crime Writers' Association Dagger award for a debut novel.

In 2007 McGilloway signed with Pan Macmillan to write three crime thrillers in his Inspector Devlin series. The sequel to Borderlands, Gallows Lane, was published in April 2008.

His 2020 novel, The Last Crossing, was nominated in the 2021 Theakston's Old Peculier Crime Novel of the Year Award.

== Published books ==
=== Benedict Devlin series ===
- 2007 - Borderlands (Pan Macmillan)
- 2008 - Gallows Lane (Pan Macmillan)
- 2009 - Bleed a River Deep (Pan Macmillan)
- 2010 - The Rising (Pan Macmillan)
- 2012 - The Nameless Dead (Constable)
- 2021 - Blood Ties (Constable)

=== Lucy Black series ===
- 2011 - Little Girl Lost (Pan Macmillan)
- 2013 - Hurt (Constable and Robinson)
- 2016 - Preserve the Dead (Corsair)
- 2017 - Bad Blood (Little Brown)

=== Single novels ===
- 2020 - The Last Crossing (Dome Press)
- 2022 - The Empty Room (Constable)
- 2025 - The One You Least Suspect (Constable)

== Podcast ==
- If walls could talk - BBC3
