= In the Cold Dark Ground =

2016 novel by Stuart MacBride

- Author: Stuart MacBride
- Language: English
- Series: Logan 'Lazarus' McRae
- Genre: Detective fiction
- Publisher: Harper Collins
- Publication date: 2016
- Publication place: Scotland
- Media type: Print
- Pages: 518
- ISBN: 978-0-00-749464-4
- Preceded by: The Missing and the Dead
- Followed by: Now We Are Dead

In the Cold Dark Ground is the tenth instalment in the bestselling Detective Sergeant McRae series of crime novels set in Aberdeenshire from Stuart MacBride.

== Plot ==
Sergeant Logan McRae is still overseeing a patch of north east Aberdeenshire as a 'Development Opportunity'. He does, however, keep finding bodies and one such find brings the MIT (Major Investigation Team) screaming up to rural Aberdeenshire from Aberdeen City. This team is headed up by McRae's old boss, Detective Chief Inspector Roberta Steel.

She wants him in the investigation; he doesn't want to join. Unfortunately, he is drafted in anyway and has to cope with a very critical Detective Superintendent (who seems to love to belittle McRae), a secondment to Professional Standards so he can spy on DCI Steel, Wee Hamish Mowat (the ganglord of Aberdeen) dying and making Logan his heir (which means fighting off Reuben, the ganglords' enforcer) and switching off his girlfriend's life support system.

Somewhere in between all this, McRae is supposed to negotiate the office politics, save himself, save DCI Steel, bury two people and solve the case.
