= Abir Mukherjee =

Scottish-Bengali author

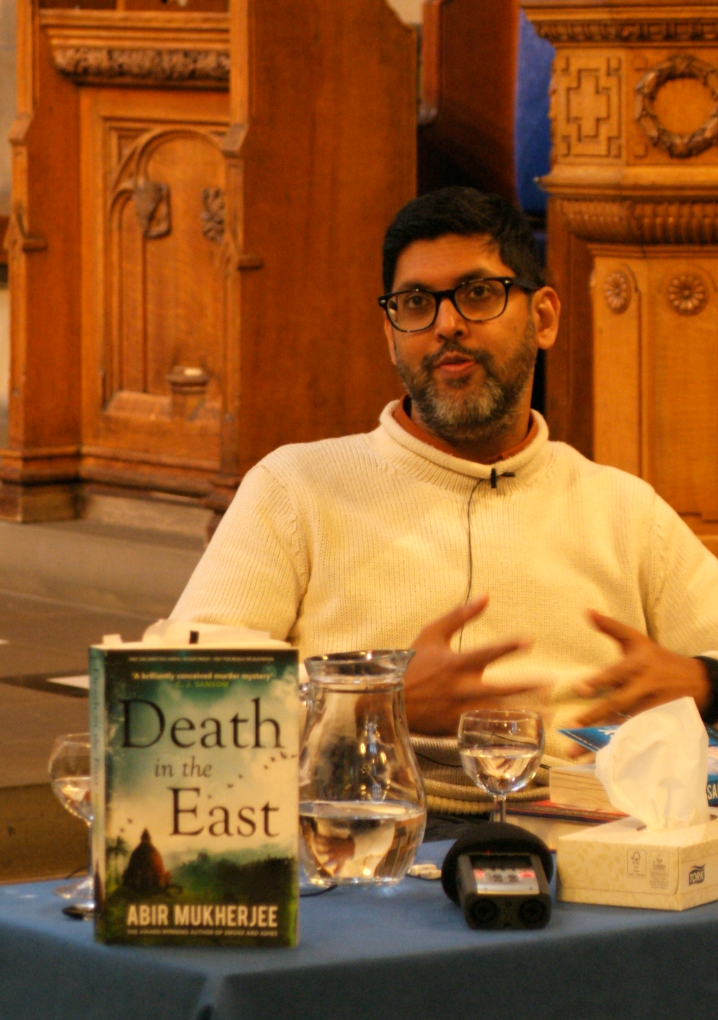
- Mukherjee in 2019
- Occupation: Author
- Spouse: Sonal
- Children: 2

Abir Mukherjee (born circa 1974) is a British-Indian author best known for his crime novels. He wrote the Wyndham and Banerjee series set in the British Raj era in India.

== Personal life ==
Mukherjee's parents moved from Calcutta, India to the United Kingdom before he was born. He grew up in Scotland and now lives in Surrey, England with his wife Sonal and two sons.

== Career ==
Before beginning his writing career, Mukherjee was an accountant for 20 years. In 2013, at age 39, Mukherjee learned that Lee Child did not begin writing until age 40 and was inspired to begin writing himself. He began writing A Rising Man in September of that year, and was motivated to keep going partly by the Telegraph's Harvill Secker Crime Writing Competition which he won the following year. The novel was ultimately published in 2016.

Mukherjee's Wyndham & Bannerjee series is based in Raj-era India. The main protagonists are Calcutta policemen Captain Sam Wyndham and Sergeant Surendranath "Surrender-not" Bannerjee. Mukherjee has stated that this era of colonization in India intrigues him because he did not learn about it in British schooling, and the stories his parents shared about India differed significantly from what he learned in the classroom.

In May 2024, Harvill Secker published Abir Mukherjee's first standalone thriller, Hunted, set during the final week of a toxic presidential campaign and which sees the parents of two political extremists trying to extricate their children from the violence set to occur.

In September 2026, he was a guest on the Off the Shelf podcast.

== Awards ==
Year	Title	Award	Result	Ref.
2014	A Rising Man	Telegraph Harvill Secker Crime Writing Prize	Winner	
2017	A Rising Man	CWA Gold Dagger	Shortlist	
2017	A Rising Man	CWA Historical Dagger	Winner	
2017	A Rising Man	HWA Gold Crown Award	Shortlist	
2017	A Rising Man	Jhalak Prize	Shortlist	
2018	A Rising Man	Barry Award for Best First Novel	Nominee	
2018	A Rising Man	Edgar Award for Best Novel	Nominee	
2018	A Rising Man	Theakston's Old Peculier Crime Novel of the Year	Shortlist	
2018	A Necessary Evil	CWA Gold Dagger	Shortlist	
2018	A Necessary Evil	CWA Historical Dagger	Shortlist	
2018	A Necessary Evil	CWA Ian Fleming Steel Dagger	Longlist	
2018	A Necessary Evil	Wilbur Smith Adventure Writing Prize	Winner	
2019	Smoke and Ashes	CWA Sapere Books Historical Dagger	Shortlist	
2019	Smoke and Ashes	CWA Gold Dagger	Longlist	
2019	Smoke and Ashes	HWA Gold Crown Award	Shortlist	
2020	Smoke and Ashes	Edgar Award for Best Novel	Nominee	
2020	Smoke and Ashes	Theakston's Old Peculier Crime Novel of the Year	Shortlist	
2020	Death in the East	CWA Sapere Books Historical Dagger	Winner	
2021	Death in the East	Theakston's Old Peculier Crime Novel of the Year	Shortlist	
2022	Shadows of Men	CWA Gold Dagger	Shortlist	

== Publications ==
=== Wyndham and Banerjee series ===
- A Rising Man (2016)
- A Necessary Evil (2017)
- Smoke and Ashes (2018)
- Death in the East (2019)
- The Shadows of Men (2021)
- The Burning Grounds (2025)

=== Other novels ===
- Hunted (2024)
- The Pinnacle (2026)
