= The Blood Road =

2018 novel by Stuart MacBride

- Author: Stuart MacBride
- Language: English
- Series: Logan 'Lazarus' McRae
- Release number: (Note: Whilst this has three main (and other supporting) characters from the Logan McRae series, the author and publishers maintain this as a separate story and so is not in the series.)
- Genre: Crime fiction
- Set in: Aberdeenshire
- Publisher: HarperCollins
- English publication date: June 2018
- Pages: 488
- ISBN: 978-0-00-820821-9
- Preceded by: Now We Are Dead
- Followed by: All That's Dead

The Blood Road is the eleventh book in the bestselling Logan McRae detective series set in Aberdeenshire by Stuart MacBride.

== Plot ==
Now working for professional standards as an inspector, McRae is called out to a car crash with the driver dead in the front seat. He questions the police officer that called him out as to why he is there; she tells him that the driver is Detective Inspector Bell, who they buried two years ago. Having to investigate Bell's apparent faked death and resurrection, McRae also becomes embroiled in an investigation into a child paedophile ring, known as the "Livestock Mart".

== Reception ==
Whilst the book garnered positive reviews, some reviewers felt uncomfortable with the very graphic descriptions of the paedophilic sex-ring. Breda Brown, writing in the Sunday Independent, said

While the paedophile storyline is stomach churning, the content rings true and is a reminder that evil people do live in the world.

Louise Fairbairn, writing in The Scotsman, described the book as being MacBride's best work to date.
