= The Business of Dying =

2002 novel by Simon Kernick

- First edition (UK)
- Author: Simon Kernick
- Language: English
- Genre: Crime thriller
- Publisher: Bantam (UK); St. Martin's Minotaur (US)
- Publication date: 2002
- Publication place: United Kingdom
- Media type: Print (hardcover and paperback)
- Pages: 335 pp
- ISBN: 978-0-593-04978-5
- OCLC: 49394382

The Business of Dying is the first novel written by Simon Kernick. In it, Kernick introduces the character Dennis Milne, who becomes the lead character in several subsequent novels. The story is a crime thriller that follows Milne, a full-time police officer and part-time hitman whose targets turn out to be customs officers and an accountant. The novel was published in the United Kingdom in 2002 by Bantam and in the United States in 2003 by St. Martin's Minotaur.

A book reviewer for The Daily Telegraph wrote that the novel is an "auspicious debut which leaves me looking forward eagerly to Mr Kernick's next book." The reviewer in Booklist wrote "Kernick's debut is compelling, dark, and suspenseful" and that "while there are a few places where his unusual plot fails to convince, Kernick clearly has a promising future". The reviewer in Publishers Weekly wrote, "Kernick does a masterful job of making Milne sympathetic, despite his callous brutalities, by combining a captivating first-person narrative with emotionally complex characterization. The portrayal of the harsh realism of the mean city streets is complemented by the revelations of the secret lives of the supporting characters with their masks of public respectability. Powerful prose, tight plotting and a clever fair-play puzzle add up to a remarkable first effort." The reviewer for the Library Journal wrote: "Told with clarity and wit, this is an unusual but effective approach to the British police procedural from a new voice. Strongly recommended." The review in Kirkus Reviews said, "Nicely plotted and briskly paced, with a voice not unlike James M. Cain's in Double Indemnity."

== Plot ==
It is 9:01 pm on a cold November night. Dennis Milne and his friend Danny are waiting at the Traveler's Rest Hotel car park to kill three unarmed men they think are drug dealers. A black Jeep Cherokee drives into the car park and comes to a halt. Milne goes up to the driver's side and shoots two of the men dead. The third tries to get out of the car and run, but does not make it. Milne is seen by a girl at the back door of the hotel, but he just walks away. They drive away and when they are away from the scene they set the car on fire and go their separate ways.

Milne is stopped at a roadblock by the police. He has to show his ID and it turns out he is a police officer. At home he acts normal and starts a new case on a murder of a prostitute. Through the news, he finds out that he killed two customs officers and an accountant. Raymond Keen, who hired Milne to do the kill, he says they did something terrible and had to die for it, but does not say what it was. It gets worse when the police working on the hotel killing show an e-fit of Milne. Danny calls him to say he was being followed but Milne does not think anything of it and says he should go on a holiday.

While trying to question a woman on the prostitute case, thinking that it might be involved in what is going on, she runs away. He chases her but she gets away and he is left by himself. Two people with hoodies walk up the street towards him. They have guns and try to kill him. After a chase, he kills one and hurts the other. He finds out who killed the hooker and wraps him up in a chair and tortures him to talk before setting him on fire. He goes to Keen's house and kills his guards after almost being killed by them and shoots Keen and makes him talk.

At the end of the book he is flying off to the Philippines with a fake passport and a different appearance.
