= Logan McRae =

Character in novels by Stuart MacBride

- First appearance: Cold Granite
- Created by: Stuart MacBride

In-universe information
- Gender: Male
- Title(s): Detective Sergeant; Detective Inspector
- Occupation: Police Officer
- Nationality: Scottish

Detective Sergeant/Detective Inspector Logan "Lazarus" McRae is the protagonist of a series of detective novels by Scottish crime writer Stuart MacBride, first introduced in 2005's Cold Granite. He is initially an officer of the Grampian police force and later Police Scotland, based mainly in Aberdeen.

== McRae's character overview ==
McRae is introduced returning to work, after for a year-long absence recovering from serious stab wounds. He is soon labelled as "Lazarus" by his colleagues as he has risen from the dead (Note: In the book, it is revealed that McRae actually died on the operating table, but was revived.) McRae had been stabbed by the Mastrick Monster (Angus Robertson) who McRae has to interview in "Flesh House" about a suspect Robertson shared a cell with. In creating McRae, Macbride states that he wanted not just an anti-hero, but an anti anti-hero.

Detectives always have big personalities but they also always have a sidekick and I thought it would be interesting to do it the other way round and make the sidekick the central character.

McRae has been described as the "last bastion of sanity in the manic Aberdeen police department; [he is] surrounded by squabbling, heavy drinking, cursing and frequently incompetent fellow officers...."

After the events of "Flesh House" (which while searching for a cannibal, led to McRae eating cooked human flesh), he became a vegetarian in "Blind Eye" the follow-up novel.

McRae donates sperm to his boss' wife (Susan) so that she can have a child. He ends up being 'father' to their two girls, Naomi and Jasmine.

By the ninth book ("The Missing and the Dead"), McRae has been moved to rural Aberdeenshire (after he breaks police procedure in questioning a suspect) under what is termed a "development opportunity". After two stints in rural Aberdeenshire, McRae takes a job with Professional standards and appears briefly in "Now We Are Dead", before being back as centre story in "The Blood Road".

== More central characters ==
This is a list of characters that have appeared in more than one novel in the series. The stories move through real time and as such, some of the earlier novels are set in the Grampian Police area of responsibility, which later becomes Police Scotland.

=== Police ===
==== Detective Chief Inspector/Sergeant Roberta Steel ====
In the second book, "Dying Light", McRae is assigned to Detective Inspector Steel's "Screw-up Squad" after a botched raid that McRae organised, left one of his colleagues in a coma. Steel is overtly lesbian and obsessed with porn and other people's sex lives. She has an abrasive nature and has been described by some as being "wonderfully scabrous". In the books, she is always noted for her odd hairstyles and for fiddling constantly with her underwear. Louise Fairbairn, writing in The Scotsman, describes her as "The human tornado with a selection of ill-fitting bras...", and as one of MacBride's "most beloved creations". It has been noted that Steel is more graphically described than McRae is and that she has "off-grey fillings and a yellow tongue”, exposes “pale, hairy shins” when her trouser legs ride up, drinks whisky like there's no tomorrow and stuffs her face with sausage rolls. She's constantly digging into her cleavage to re-arrange her bra, which she swears is her girlfriend's, not hers." Similarly, Sue Arnold, writing in The Guardian said of DI Steel that she was "[a] hard-drinking, chain-smoking, foul-mouthed but lovable lesbian...".

Her use of language, descriptive and foul, is legendary within Grampian Police and later, Police Scotland. In "All That's Dead", Steel is quoted as saying "You'll no' see the bright side with your heid jammed up your arse". (Note: Heid is a Scots pronunciation of the word head.) Something which prompts a detective inspector to comment wryly that she should hire herself out as a motivational speaker.

After it is revealed that Steel fabricated evidence against an alleged rapist, she is investigated by Professional Standards ("In the Cold Dark Ground"), she is demoted to Detective Sergeant, but in the novel "Now We Are Dead", she is exonerated when it is found the alleged rapist was working in a team who gave him false alibis. By the third book after her demotion ("All That's Dead"), she is still a Detective Sergeant and working closely with McRae again.

==== Detective Sergeant Simon Rennie ====
Originally introduced as a detective constable, Rennie is a foil for most of the jokes and is seen as a bit of a loose chain in the link. He can be quite huffy and subscribes to New Scientist. He is the subject of much ridicule and in the second book "Dying Light" he is assigned to DI Steel's Screw-up Squad although he protests that as he has only just been made into a detective constable, he hasn't screwed up at all. Steel elucidates by saying that "everyone is here because they screwed up; you're here because you are expected to screw up".

Despite this, it is later revealed during several raids that Rennie is quite accomplished with guns, much to everyones surprise.

==== Detective Inspector David Insch ====
Insch is McRae's immediate boss in some of their cases during the first four books. He is described as being overweight; he is always eating sweets and goes quite quickly from a shade of pink to purple. The after effects of the Flesh House case, see Insch leave the police after he attacks a prisoner.

Insch appears in "Close to the Bone" when he is working as a production assistant at a media company. He is still working for Zander but only mentioned in "All That's Dead".

==== Chief Superintendent Nigel Napier ====
Napier (also known as the "Ginger Ninja") works as the boss of professional standards and is always investigating McRae. It comes as a major surprise to McRae that Napier wishes him to transfer to professional standards as a DI during the events of "In the Cold Dark Ground".

==== WPC Jackie "Ball Breaker" Watson ====
Watson is first introduced in "Cold Granite" as an assistant for McRae (though it feels like babysitting for McRae). Watson is nicknamed "Ball-breaker", a fact that DI Insch warns McRae about ("they don't call her Ball Breaker for nothing") and by the second novel ("Dying Light") she has moved in with McRae. By the third book "Broken Skin", she is on DI Insch's team and actively pursuing a rapist. She assaults the suspected rapist more than once, causing him to be in a coma and precipitating the break-up of her relationship with McRae. Watson re-appears in "Flesh House" as a part on an internal review being carried out by Strathclyde Police into one of the Grampian Police's investigations and on "Close to the Bone" having a sexual affair with Logan while his girlfriend Samantha is in the hospital.

==== Detective Sergeant Bob "Biohazard Bob" Marshall ====
Bob works in CID alongside McRae and is famed for his telephone manner and breaking wind in the office

==== Detective Sergeant Doreen Taylor ====
Baby sitter twice. Once with a real child and the other intended as a minder keeping Superintendent Green away from fouling up in Shatter the Bones.

Attends Wee Hamish Mowat funeral.

==== PC (later DC) Stewart "Tufty" Quirrel ====
Quirrel's first name begins with an 'S', hence the nickname of Tufty. Tufty is introduced in the first book where McRae ends up in Banffshire ("The Missing and the Dead") and is later to be found working with Detective Sergeant Roberta Steel in "Now We Are Dead". Tufty is described as being "out of his depth" and, on account of his shyness (especially around women), the Pooh Bear to DCI Steel's Irascible Rabbit.

==== Detective Chief Inspector Andrew Finnie ====
Finnie ( also known as Frog-Face Finnie) is mentioned and has a small role in the first four books with a more prominent role in the fifth book, "Blind Eye" after DI Insch is sacked.

==== Sergeant (Big Gary) McCormack ====
An ever present in the Aberdeen based novels as Desk Sergeant and Fed Rep as well as unwilling message taker for McRae.

==== Police Constable Janet Nicholson ====
Wannabe CID officer in search of a nickname in "The Missing and the Dead" and preferred alternative companion to Tufty Quirrel. Drives without fear leaving that to Logan. By "In the Cold Dark Ground" she is established as "Calamity".

==== Detective Sergeant Becky McKenzie ====
Appears in the first of the uniformed Logan McRae novels "The Missing and the Dead" as dogsbody for Steel in place of the usual whipping boys McRae and Rennie.

==== Detective Inspector Andy "Ding-Dong" Bell ====
Ding-Dong has some minor roles in the later books (with a more prominent role in "Now We Are Dead"), but in "The Blood Road", he is found dead in a car crash when he supposedly had already died two years earlier.

==== Detective Inspector Beattie ====
Absolute proof of the truth of the Peter Principle that organizations manage careers so that everyone "rises to the level of their incompetence." Except that he appears to have achieved that at Sergeant level but still gets higher rank ahead of McRae.

==== Detective Sergeant Lorna Chalmers ====
Appears twice in Mcrae stories. In Close to the Bone she comes very close to being murdered when trying to achieve a solution to the case without Acting Inspector Mcrae. In The Blood Road her death results in Logan working the case when still in with the Professional Standards and seconded by his boss Supt Doig.

==== Detective Inspector MacPherson ====
Largely unseen but frequently mentioned when matters begin to unwind and usually due to some accident or blunder brought about by him resulting in injury to himself with the need to re-plan in his absence. Still around in Blood Road having undermined a briefing by breaking the projector.

==== Maggie ====
The Voice of Control, the constant stream of police radio chatter and source of local newspapers around her desk. Like Hector not always seen.

=== Supporting ===
==== Isobel MacAlister ====
Isobel is a pathologist for Police Scotland based in Aberdeenshire (originally Grampian Police) who is the former lover of Logan McRae. Before the first book starts, her relationship with Logan has broken down and she has started a relationship with a journalist, Colin Miller. During Cold Granite, McRae realises that Isobel is giving Miller the inside track on some murder cases.

==== Samantha Mackie ====
A forensic technician who works for Grampian Police who is first introduced in "Flesh House" and who later becomes McRae's girlfriend. She is paralysed and left in a coma after a fire and during the events in "Shatter the Bones", and whilst she is comatose in hospital, McRae imagines having conversations with her. During his time in Banffshire, McRae is living in the police house and eating tinned soup so that he can afford to pay for her 24-hour care. At the end of "The Missing and the Dead" Samantha is kidnapped and half-drowned, which makes her seriously ill. She dies after McRae switches off her life support in the novel "In the Cold Dark Ground".

==== Louise ====
Carer for the comatose Samantha in hospital and hospice.

==== Colin Miller ====
A flashy journalist introduced in the first book, "Cold Granite" and who spars with McRae, but they end up being friends despite Miller setting up home with Isobel McAlister and Miller losing his fingers to torture by a gangster, an event that he holds McRae responsible for.

==== Dave Goulding ====
Brought in initially to profile a killer but becomes interested in McRae's state of mind after his several difficulties simply trying to stay alive. Many conversations are a combination of Logan trying to get a profile written while Goulding attempts to arrange appointments so he can examine McRae.

=== Others ===
==== Sandy Moir-Farquharson ====
Also known as "Hissing Sid". A lawyer who frequently gets criminals off the charges laid against them by the Grampian Police (later Police Scotland). Moir-Farquharson is punched by a suspect which causes huge amounts of glee amongst the police officers especially DI Insch who acquires a video of it. Moir-Farquaharson is later engaged by McRae to defend DCI Steel when she is accused of fabricated evidence. His surname should be pronounced as "Facherson".

==== Wee Hamish Mowat ====
Hamish Alexander Selkirk Mowat is a local gangster whose chief enforcer is a "brute" called Reuben. Despite Mowat wanting them both to get along, Reuben and McRae regularly come to blows over who will take over Mowat's empire when he is gone (Mowat is on his deathbed in "In the Cold Dark Ground"). McRae does not want Mowat's empire or the money, but Mowat dearly wishes him to accept it, though that would have to be over Reuben's dead body.

==== Reuben Kennedy ====
Wee Hamish Mowat's chief enforcer; he and McRae regularly come to blows, especially in events of In the Cold Dark Ground when Wee Hamish dies and Reuben assumes control of the enterprise forcing McRae to get tough.

==== Johnny /John Urquhart ====
The courier used by Wee Hamish Mowat to deliver "evidence" for Finnie and later McRae to undermine competing businesses but also able to turn his hand to casual brutality and murder. In early stories always seen with green hair although in "Shatter the Bones" in a lime shade until the short story 22 Dead Little Bodies when he is suited and overpays when buying McRae's flat.

More mature when meeting Logan in the novels set in Banff as a foil for Reuben before his attempt to become heir to Wee Hamish's empire and especially his pig farm when Reuben is rescued from hospital at the end of In The Cold Dark Ground

==== Susan ====
Steel's wife and birth mother to their two children. She is first heard of in "Dying Light" when Steel is talking to her on the phone. In "Shatter the Bones" Steel lifts her daughter from her "Baby Barlinnie" where Macbride gives the child her full name of Jasmine Catherine Cassandra Steel-Wallace. Joint surname implied [inferred?]?

==== Timothy Mair ====
Dildo the "shop cop". Often a victim of offloaded cases because they can be loosely termed trading standards territory. Rarely meets McRae at the agreed time although he does turn up but Logan does not. A victim in "Shatter the Bones" in another way but after a considerable absence from subsequent books he is mentioned in "Blood Road" as an active colleague of Logan's current girlfriend Tara.

==== Zander / Alexander Clark ====
A film producer who makes safety videos for staff training. To the delight of Roberta Steel he also has a sideline in making porn films which involve some of the suspects that Steel and McRae need to pursue albeit with her very easily distracted.

In "Shatter the Bones" she is distraught to find that Zander has abandoned that side of his studio work to emulate Peter Jackson and do for Aberdeen what Jackson did for New Zealand.

He makes an appearance in "All That's Dead" where he supplies computer time for Logan which in turn gives Tufty his big break in show business (maybe not).

==== Malcolm McLennan ====
Also known as Malk the Knife, is discussed in several books, but he only appears in one scene in "In the Cold Dark Ground" when he attends Wee Hamish Mowat's funeral. McLennan is a known gangster from Edinburgh who runs drugs, racketeering rings and sex workers.

== List of novels ==
- Cold Granite (2005)
- Dying Light (2006)
- Broken Skin (2007, published in America as Bloodshot)
- Flesh House (2008)
- Blind Eye (2009)
- Dark Blood (2010)
- Shatter the Bones (2011)
- Partners in Crime (Two Logan and Steel short stories: Bad Heir Day and Stramash) (2012, eBook containing 2 short stories: "Stramash" and "DI Steel's Bad Heir Day")
- Close to the Bone (2013)
- The 45% Hangover (2014, novella)
- 22 Dead Little Bodies (A Logan and Steel short novel) (2015, contains the titular short novel paired with the short stories from Partners in Crime)
- The Missing and the Dead (2015)
- In the Cold Dark Ground (2016)
- Now We Are Dead (2017)
- The Blood Road (2018)
- All That's Dead (2019)
- This House of Burning Bones (2025)
