= Cold Granite =

2005 novel by Stuart MacBride

- First edition
- Author: Stuart MacBride
- Language: English
- Series: Logan 'Lazarus' McRae
- Release number: 1
- Genre: Crime fiction
- Publisher: Harper Collins
- Publication date: 2005
- Media type: Paperback
- Pages: 581
- ISBN: 0-00-719314-9
- Followed by: Dying Light

Cold Granite is the debut novel written by Stuart MacBride. It features Detective Sergeant Logan McRae (who is later nicknamed "Lazarus") as its central character, who works for Grampian Police in Aberdeen, Scotland. Logan McRae went on to feature in a series of books which became a bestseller series for MacBride.

== Plot ==
It is Logan McRae's first week back after being on sick leave for a year; courtesy of Angus Robertson (The Mastrick Monster) who carved him up with a knife. Someone is kidnapping children, murdering them and mutilating them afterwards. The local paper screams about police incompetence and is gunning for McRae's boss, Detective Inspector David Insch. McRae discovers that someone is leaking the stories to a journalist, Colin Miller, who inadvertently disrupts Grampian Polices' plans to apprehend the killer by revealing their plan to wait out in a secluded location which the killer thinks is safe.

McRae discovers that Miller's source is none other than his ex-girlfriend, Isobel McAlister, the police pathologist, who is now living with Miller and tells him about her day to unwind.

Meanwhile, the local council worker who removes all the dead animals from the roads (affectionately called "Roadkill") is found to have a dead girl in his tip and another dead girl is discovered on the local rubbish dump.

== Reception ==
The book earned MacBride a Barry Award for Best First Novel. Matthew Lewin, writing in The Guardian, described the book as "Tartan Noir" which is laced with gallows humour but that the author [MacBride] just can't pull off. He also said that the book left him with tears of boredom.

Susan Manfield, writing in The Scotsman, said that

Cold Granite is a capable police thriller, and a good read - outside of mealtimes. A promising debut, for MacBride and for Aberdeen, Scotland's new city of (fictional) crime.
