= Relentless (Kernick novel) =

2006 crime novel by Simon Kernick

The Public Image
- First edition
- Author: Simon Kernick
- Language: English
- Publisher: Bantam Press
- Publication date: 2006
- Publication place: United Kingdom
- Media type: Print, audio & eBook
- Pages: 352
- ISBN: 0-593-05471-7

Relentless is Simon Kernick's fifth thriller and crime novel originally published in June 2006. Its sales were helped by the book being one of Richard & Judy's Summer Book Club recommendations in 2007. It was the 8th best-selling paperback, and the best-selling thriller in the UK in the same year. It has sold over 300,000 copies and was the 4th most borrowed book from UK libraries in 2008. The Guardian summed up its review of the book with "pretty much unputdownable".

A review in The Times called it "a fine performance" with "down-to-earth realism" but marred by a parallel with an English football match during a date and time when there would be no games in real life. A review in The Independent wrote "this is probably Kernick's best novel yet". Reviews from readers are considerably less uniform. Criticisms include implausible plot elements, poor research, shallow characterisation and gratuitous violence/swearing.

== Plot ==
One Saturday afternoon, Tom Meron, a happily married middle-class man, receives a phone call from his old friend Jack Calley, a high-flying city lawyer whom he hasn't seen or heard from in years. While on the phone, Tom hears Jack being murdered on the line; his last words being the first two lines of Tom's address. Tom, terrified and confused, grabs his children and flees the house. While leaving the neighborhood, he passes a suspicious vehicle heading towards his house. He leaves his children with his mother-in-law and goes to find his wife only to be attacked in her office by a balaclava-clad man wielding an already bloody knife. He is then quickly arrested by the police on suspicion of murder. Tom is questioned about the murder of Vanessa Blake (his wife's work partner), telling him that there was evidence that he was at the crime scene.

Meanwhile, Mike Bolt is working into a suicide–murder case of the chief justice and he thinks it might have something to do with Jack Calley because he was his solicitor. He finds out that the last call Jack made was to Tom Meron's landline so he goes to Tom's house to question him. Though Tom has just been released on bail, Mike orders Tom's re-arrest in order to question him. Officers attempt to apprehend Tom after he exits the station, but Tom decides to make a break for it. He manages to get a good way away but pulls up beside him. Thinking it is the police, he turns around (admitting defeat) when he is violently subdued by a man in a baseball cap, and subsequently forced into the back of the car. Tom quickly learns that the two men who kidnapped him mean to question Tom.
