= The Mermaids Singing =

1995 crime novel by Val McDermid

- First edition (publ. HarperCollins)
- Author: Val McDermid
- Language: English
- Publication date: 1995

The Mermaids Singing (1995) is a crime novel by Scottish author Val McDermid. The first featuring her recurring protagonist, Dr. Tony Hill, it was adapted into the pilot episode of ITV1's television series based on McDermid's work, Wire in the Blood, starring Robson Green and Hermione Norris.

The title is part of the fifth line from the poem Song by John Donne, that was referenced in a poem by T. S. Eliot, The Love Song of J. Alfred Prufrock.

== Plot ==
In the fictional English city of Bradfield, men are being abducted and tortured to death using brutal medieval techniques. The bodies are then found in areas frequented by gay men and women. The police reluctantly recruit a criminal profiler, Dr. Tony Hill. He joins forces with Detective Inspector Carol Jordan, for whom he develops complicated romantic feelings. Dr. Tony Hill has problems of his own, including a mysterious woman named Angelica who frequently calls him for phone sex. As Tony becomes increasingly involved in the investigation, it becomes apparent that the killer is seeking Tony as the next victim. The killer is revealed to be the anonymous caller Angelica, a transgender woman who kills men that do not return her affections. When kidnapped, Tony figures out her weakness (her desire to be loved) and uses it to avoid being tortured and murdered.

== Major themes ==
McDermid wrote The Mermaids Singing in response to themes of misogyny she saw appearing in detective fiction. According to McDermid:

When I wrote my first serial killer novel, The Mermaids Singing, back in 1995, it was partly as a reaction against a slew of novels coming out of the US in which hideous violence was meted out to female victims whose only role in the books was to be raped, mutilated, dismembered and strewn across the landscape. Those books were all written by men. I wanted to do things differently, so I chose to write about victims who had a hinterland, who had personalities and who were men. And yes, I wrote clearly about the violence done to them because I believed it was necessary in the context of this book. To write about a clinical psychologist who reads the message of a crime scene without allowing the reader to see what he sees seems to me to be perverse.

Angelica, the transgender murderer in The Mermaids Singing, is intended by McDermid as a subversion of and commentary on this gendered pattern; with her graphic descriptions of what Winter Elliott calls "violence exhibited on male bodies, bodies open and exhibited to the reader", McDermid reverses common patterns in crime fiction of the objectification of female bodies.

Kate Watson describes The Mermaids Singing as "both within and against a prior conception and tradition of crime fiction," and as "challeng[ing] the traditional grand narrative of crime fiction that defines the male as killer and female as victim." Meghan Freeman says that the book works "to speak to the voicelessness that is an important dimension of the rape victim’s violation without speaking for that victim," and "to represent the processes by which rape victims are denied the opportunity to be recognized as victims."

In addition to feminist themes, The Mermaids Singing also engages in exploration of psychological profiling as a police method. Isabel Santaulària criticizes the novel for, in so doing, "ultimately endors[ing] the status quo and the state apparatuses that regulate it and guarantee its preservation."

== Reception ==
The Mermaids Singing was awarded the Crime Writers' Association Gold Dagger for Best Crime Novel of the Year.

Kirkus Reviews praised the novel, commenting on the "grim details", while Publishers Weekly commented: "woven into this powerful story are journal entries in which the murderer discusses torture in loving detail, an aspect that makes this graphic, psychologically terrifying tale almost as off-putting as it is impossible to put down."

While some critics have praised The Mermaids Singing for its feminism and its subversion of the crime genre, others, such as J. C. Bernthal, have criticized its "extraordinarily damaging stereotypes" about transgender women.
