= Simon Kernick =

British thriller/crime writer

Simon Kernick (born February 1967 in Slough, Buckinghamshire) is a British thriller/crime writer now living in Oxfordshire with his two daughters. Kernick attended Gillotts School, a comprehensive in Henley-on-Thames, Oxfordshire. Whilst he was a student his jobs included fruit-picker and Christmas-tree uprooter. He graduated from Brighton Polytechnic in 1991 with a degree in humanities.

His novel Relentless was recommended on Richard & Judy's Summer book club 2007. It was the 8th best-selling paperback, and the best-selling thriller in the UK in the same year.

== Awards ==
Awards for Kernick's writing
Year	Title	Award	Result	Ref.
2003	The Business of Dying	Barry Award for Best British Crime	Finalist	
2004	The Murder Exchange	Barry Award for Best British Crime	Finalist	
2005	The Crime Trade	Barry Award for Best British Crime	Finalist	
2005	A Good Day To Die	Steel Dagger Award	Finalist	
2006	A Good Day To Die	Barry Award for Best British Crime	Finalist	
2007	Relentless	Barry Award for Best Thriller	Finalist	
2015		Dagger in the Library	Longlist	

== Bibliography ==
- The Business of Dying (Dennis Milne 1) (2002) — (Bantam, ISBN 0-593-04978-0)
- The Murder Exchange (2003) — (Bantam, ISBN 0-593-04979-9)
- The Crime Trade (Tina Boyd 1) (2004) — (Bantam, ISBN 0-593-05135-1)
- A Good Day To Die (Dennis Milne 2) (2005) — (Bantam, ISBN 0-593-05146-7)
- Relentless (Tina Boyd 2, Mike Bolt 1) (2006) — (Bantam, ISBN 0-593-05471-7)
- Severed (Mike Bolt 2) (2007) — (Bantam, ISBN 0-593-05473-3)
- Deadline (Tina Boyd 3) (2008)
- Target (Tina Boyd 4, Mike Bolt 3) (2009)
- The Last 10 Seconds (Tina Boyd 5, Mike Bolt 4) (2010)
- The Payback (Dennis Milne 3, Tina Boyd 6) (2011)
- Siege(Scope 1, plus Tina Boyd) (2012)
- Wrong Time, Wrong Place (2013, February)
- Ultimatum (Tina Boyd 7, Mike Bolt 5) (2013, June)
- Stay Alive (Mike Bolt 6, Scope 2) (2014)
- The Final Minute (Tina Boyd 8) (2015, January)
- The Witness (DI Ray Mason 1) (2016, January)
- The Bone Field (DI Ray Mason 2, Tina Boyd 9) (2017, January)
- The Hanged Man (DI Ray Mason 3, Tina Boyd 10) (2018, January)
- Dead Mans Gift & Other Stories (2018, July)
- We Can See You (2018, November)
- Die Alone (DI Ray Mason 4, Tina Boyd 11, Mike Bolt 7) (2019, November)
- Kill A Stranger (2020)
- Good Cop Bad Cop (2021)
- The First 48 Hrs (2023)
- You All Die Tonight (2025)
