= Graham Hurley =

English writer

- Born: 1 November 1946 (age 79–80); Clacton-on-Sea, Essex
- Writing career
- Genre: Crime

Graham Hurley (born 1 November 1946) at Clacton on Sea, is an English crime fiction writer.

Formerly based in Portsmouth but now relocated in the West Country, he is best known for creating the character of DI Joe Faraday, following several standalone novels. He contributed a column to The Portsmouth News. He received both a BA and an MA in English from the University of Cambridge.

He worked as a script-writer with Southern Television before becoming a researcher and later a director. For TVS He filmed the discovery of the seabed wrecks of the Titanic and the Bismarck (with American oceanographer Robert Ballard) and produced ITV's account of Richard Branson's attempt to cross the Atlantic by balloon.

== Bibliography ==
=== Standalone Novels ===
- Rules of Engagement
- Reaper
- The Devil's Breath
- Thunder in the Blood
- Sabbathman
- The Perfect Soldier
- Heaven's Light
- Nocturne
- Permissible Limits

=== DI Joe Faraday series ===
- Turnstone
- The Take
- Angels Passing
- Deadlight
- Cut To Black
- Blood and Honey
- One Under
- The Price of Darkness
- No Lovelier Death
- Beyond Reach
- Borrowed Light
- Happy Days (2012)
- Backstory (2012) - A collection of stories filling the back story of the series

=== D/S Jimmy Suttle series ===
- Western Approaches (2012)
- Touching Distance (2013)
- Sins of the Father (2014)
- The Order of Things (2015)

=== Wars Within series ===
- Finisterre (2016)
- Aurore (2017)
- Estocada (2018)
- Raid 42 (2019)
- Last Flight To Stalingrad (2020)
- Kyiv (2021)
- Katastrophe (2022)
- The Blood of Others (2023)
- Dead Ground (2024)

=== Enora Andressen series ===
- Curtain Call (2019)
- Sight Unseen (2019)
- Off Script (2020)
- Limelight (2020)
- Intermission (2021)

== Adaptations ==
Gétévé and France Télévisions started adapting Hurley's Faraday stories in 2011 through 90 minute television films under the title Deux Flics sur les Docks (lit. Two Cops on the Docks). Jean-Marc Barr and Bruno Solo headline the series, portraying Joe Faraday and Paul Winter respectively. By the end of 2013, six films have been produced and broadcast, adapting the novels Angels Passing, Cut To Black, One Under, Blood and Honey, Deadlight and The Take.
