= Stuart MacBride =

Scottish writer (born 1969)

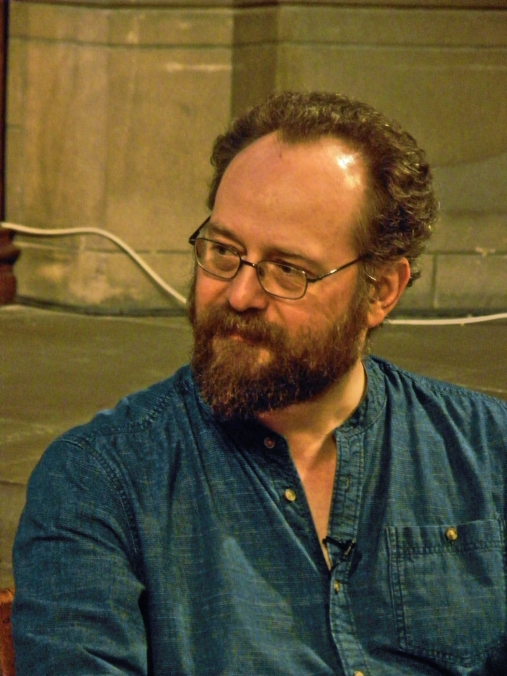
- Born: 27 February 1969 (age 57); Dumbarton, Scotland
- Occupation: Novelist
- Spouse: Fiona MacBride
- Writing career
- Genres: Crime; Tartan Noir; Sci-fi
- Notable work: Logan McRae series
- Website: www.stuartmacbride.com

Stuart MacBride is a Scottish writer, whose crime thrillers are set in the "Granite City" of Aberdeen, with Detective Sergeant Logan McRae as protagonist.

== Biography ==
Stuart MacBride was born 27 February 1969 in Dumbarton, near Glasgow and raised in Aberdeen. His occupations included scrubbing toilets offshore, graphic design, web design and IT/computer programming. He studied architecture at Heriot-Watt University.

MacBride's publishing deal was secured with the writing of Halfhead; however, the publishers were more interested in Cold Granite, concerning DS Logan McRae. He was signed on a three-book Logan deal, which was further extended to six books. In 2009 he signed another deal, allowing him to write two more Logan books, and two standalone novels, the first of which due after the sixth instalment of the Logan McRae series. In an interview for the Alibi television channel, MacBride indicated he considered R. D. Wingfield a "literary inspiration". MacBride's novels, particularly those featuring Logan McRae, have been described as Tartan Noir, which has placed him alongside Ian Rankin and Val McDermid as authors who have also been described as luminaries of the genre.

He now lives in Aberdeenshire with his wife, Fiona.

Macbride is one of the initial batch of ten people in the Aberdeen Hall of Heroes, being awarded World Stovies Champion in 2014. He also won Celebrity Mastermind in 2017 with a specialist subject on the life and works of A. A. Milne.

== Bibliography ==
=== Logan McRae novels ===
- 2005 – Cold Granite
- 2006 – Dying Light
- 2007 – Broken Skin (published in America as Bloodshot)
- 2008 – Flesh House
- 2009 – Blind Eye
- 2010 – Dark Blood
- 2011 – Shatter the Bones
- 2013 – Close to the Bone
- 2015 – 22 Dead Little Bodies
- 2015 – The Missing and the Dead
- 2016 – In the Cold Dark Ground
- 2018 – The Blood Road
- 2019 – All That's Dead
- 2025 – This House of Burning Bones

==== Roberta Steel novels ====
- 2017 – Now We Are Dead
- 2026 - And the Corpse Wore Tartan
- 2026 - Blood, Rust and Steel

=== Oldcastle novels ===
- 2012 – Birthdays for the Dead
- 2014 – A Song for the Dying
- 2017 – A Dark So Deadly
- 2021 – The Coffinmaker’s Garden
- 2022 – No Less the Devil
- 2024 – In a Place of Darkness

=== Standalone ===
- 2009 – Halfhead (Writing as Stuart B. Macbride)
- 2023 – The Dead of Winter

=== Other works ===
- 2008 – Sawbones (A novella)
- 2011 – Twelve Days of Winter (A short story collection)
- 2012 – Partners in Crime (Two Logan and Steel short stories: Bad Heir Day and Stramash)
- 2014 – The 45% Hangover (A Logan and Steel novella)
- 2024 - The Tasting Menu (A short story)

== Awards ==
- Won, Barry Award for Best First Novel, 2006 (for Cold Granite)
- Won, CWA Dagger in the Library Award, 2007
- Won, ITV3 Crime Thriller Award for Breakthrough Author of the Year, 2008 (for Broken Skin)
- Nominated, International Thriller Writers Awards, Best Debut Novel, 2006 (for Cold Granite)
- Nominated, Theakston's Old Peculier Crime Novel of the Year Award, 2006 (for Cold Granite)
- Nominated, Theakston's Old Peculier Crime Novel of the Year Award, 2007 (for Dying Light)
- Nominated, Barry Award for Best British Crime Novel, 2007 (for Dying Light)
- Nominated, Theakston's Old Peculier Crime Novel of the Year Award, 2009 (for Broken Skin)

== See also ==
- List of Logan McRae characters
