= The Missing and the Dead =

2015 novel by Stuart MacBride

- Author: Stuart MacBride
- Language: English
- Series: Logan 'Lazarus' McRae
- Genre: Detective fiction
- Publisher: Harper Collins
- Publication date: 2015
- Publication place: Scotland
- Media type: Print
- Pages: 581
- ISBN: 978-0-00-749460-6
- Preceded by: 22 Dead Little Bodies
- Followed by: In the Cold Dark Ground

The Missing and the Dead is the ninth instalment in the bestselling Detective Sergeant McRae series of crime novels set in Aberdeenshire from Stuart MacBride.

== Plot ==
Acting Detective Inspector Logan McRae manages to catch Graham Stirling who has kidnapped Stephen Bisset and tortured him. Unfortunately the only way to get Stirling to talk is to break a few rules regarding procedure....

With Professional Standards breathing down his neck, Logan is sent on a "development opportunity" babysitting a rural patch of north-east Aberdeenshire as a police Sergeant. A child's body found in the Tarlair Swimming Pool, a hopeful mother of a dead girl and Detective Chief Inspector Steele messing things up really do not help Logan settle into his new job. The dead girl's mother (Helen) even moves into Logan's police house whilst he is supposed to be finding out who the dead girl is and who killed her.

Added to this is the prospect of fighting off the son and daughter of Stephen Bisset who want answers from Logan, Graham Stirling being released and twisting the story of Stephen Bisset's death means that Samantha (Logan's girlfriend) is kidnapped while still comatose from the fire in Logan's flat in a previous story.

The original cover features the open-air Tarlair Swimming Pool on the Banffshire coast. MacBride said that he scouted the location and when he saw how dilapidated the swimming pool was, he declared that he "just had to find a body in there." MacBride also went on several drugs raids with Police Scotland and also spent some time with their traffic unit in the area.

== Critical reception ==
Shirley Whiteside, writing in The Independent, was positive about the book and states that "MacBride has written another riveting page-turner. Although seamed with his usual pitch-black humour it is not as macabre as some of McRae's previous outings but is more emotional and affecting."

Laura Wilson, writing in The Guardian, was impressed by the slower pace of the novel stating that

The result is some slackening of tension – MacBride’s novels are usually fairly humming with it – but so skilful is the storytelling, and so strong the characterisation, that this window on to the world of some old friends proves both intriguing and engrossing.

Jane Jakeman, writing in The Independent, said "This is a big, fat book, with the story unrolling over nearly 600 pages, but the multiple plots move fast and MacBride convincingly conveys the dilapidated atmosphere of the police station – surely the most realistic in this fictional survey, with its peeling walls and ancient banter."
