= Wire in the Blood =

British television crime drama series (2002–2008)

- Title card
- Genre: Crime drama
- Based on: Tony Hill and Carol Jordan series by Val McDermid
- Starring: Robson Green; Hermione Norris; Simone Lahbib; Mark Letheren; Emma Handy; Tom Chadbon; Peter Sullivan
- Country of origin: United Kingdom
- Original language: English
- No. of series: 6
- No. of episodes: 24

Production
- Executive producer: Sandra Jobling
- Producer: Philip Leach
- Editor: Keith Palmer
- Running time: 90 mins. (Series 2–5); 60 mins. (Series 1 and 6)

Original release
- Network: ITV
- Release: 14 November 2002 – 31 October 2008

Wire in the Blood is a British crime drama television series, created and produced by Coastal Productions with Tyne Tees Television and broadcast on ITV from 14 November 2002 to 31 October 2008. The series is based on the Tony Hill and Carol Jordan series of novels by Scottish writer Val McDermid. It features university clinical psychologist, Dr. Anthony "Tony" Valentine Hill – played by Robson Green – who taps into his own dark side to get inside the heads of serial killers. Working with Carol Jordan and other detectives, Hill takes on tough and seemingly impenetrable cases in an attempt to track down the killers before they strike again.

ITV cancelled the series in 2009, citing high production costs – which were estimated at up to £750,000 per episode – and the competition of numerous new series being broadcast on the network.

== Plot ==
The series is set in the fictional town of Bradfield, which is assumed to lie within West Yorkshire. It follows the Major Incident Team (MIT) of Bradfield Metropolitan Police's CID, and the assistance provided to the detectives by clinical psychologist and serial offender profiler Dr. Tony Hill. All of the episodes revolve around a serial killer whom Hill helps to track down by means of a profile, based on the killer's actions.

From Series 1 to 3, the MIT is headed by Detective Inspector Carol Jordan (she is Chief Inspector from Series 2). She develops a close relationship with Dr. Hill. (This is further explored in McDermid's novels, in which Jordan is always head of the MIT.)

In the first episode of Series 4, Jordan is replaced—without real explanation—by Detective Inspector Alex Fielding. While initially hesitant to accept Hill's support, she also develops a close working relationship with the psychologist.

A constant theme is Jordan's, and later Fielding's, struggle with their senior officers, who are often less trusting of Hill's eccentric methods and far-fetched theories than are the two detectives. There is also a romantic storyline showing a growing development in Hill's personal relationship with each of the detectives. Whilst starting as friendships, each detective begins to develop romantic feelings for Hill, although neither develops a full relationship with him.

== Cast ==
- Robson Green as Dr. Anthony "Tony" Hill
- Hermione Norris as (DI then) DCI Carol Jordan (Series 1–3)
- Simone Lahbib as DI Alex Fielding (Series 4–6)
- Mark Letheren as DS Kevin Geoffries (Series 1–6)
- Emma Handy as DC Paula McIntyre (Series 2–6)
- Tom Chadbon as ACC John Brandon (Series 1–2)
- Peter Sullivan as ACC Paul Eden (Series 3–4)
- Alan Stocks as DS Don Merrick (Series 1–2)
- Doreene Blackstock as DS Annie Reiss (Series 1)
- Elaine Claxton as Maggie Thomas (Series 1)
- Mark Penfold as Dr. Ashley Vernon (Series 1–5)
- Michael Smiley as Dr. Liam Kerwin (Series 6)
- Jethro Skinner as Tim Eccles (Series 3–5)
- Barry King as PC.Barry (Series 1–4)

== Characters ==
- Dr. Tony Hill (Robson Green), a clinical psychologist whose expertise with damaged minds has proved invaluable to the police. Intelligent and endearing, if somewhat eccentric, he is driven by a tangible sense of right and wrong. His understanding of human behaviour enables him to empathise strongly with both victim and killer. Hill forms a close bond with Carol Jordan, and they contribute to the successful prosecution and conviction of many serial killers. Hill is devastated when Jordan abruptly leaves Bradfield to work in South Africa. Hill also gains the support of Jordan's successor, female detective Alex Fielding. But Tony's involvement with the police often affects him deeply, as he finds it difficult to distance himself emotionally from disturbing cases. Actor Robson Green conducted his own research for the series, during which he spent time with criminal psychologist Julian Boon. Green described Boon in part as an "extraordinary, intelligent, nice guy who carried his life in a blue bag and traveled on a double-decker bus. No one looked at him twice.". He adopted the prop of a plastic "blue bag" from Boon's practice.
- D.C.I. Carol Jordan (Hermione Norris) (Series 1–3), a hardworking officer who forms a close relationship with Hill, successfully working with him to secure the arrest of several killers. In series 2's "Right to Silence", Jordan is promoted from Detective Inspector to Detective Chief Inspector. Although she grows close to Hill, they never achieve the romantic relationship that she desires. She leaves Bradfield to take a position in South Africa. Speaking of Norris's portrayal of Carol Jordan, Val McDermid said that she "brings real intelligence and insight to her role, demonstrating that there's a lot more to her skills than we got to see in Cold Feet."
- D.I. Alex Fielding (Simone Lahbib) (Series 4–6), a senior detective and a dedicated professional. Her warmth and down-to-earth style have gained her the respect of her police colleagues and Dr. Hill. She learns to trust that Hill's intuition can sometimes be the key to cracking a case. But the pressure of working on murder investigations sometimes causes a strain on her as a single mum to young Ben. When she is under stress, she finds it difficult to ask for help.
- D.S. Kevin Geoffries (Mark Letheren), a proven worthy member of the team, despite a few indiscretions and lapses in judgement. He comes to respect Hill, believing that he can offer an extra dimension to the investigations. Kevin works closely with Paula McIntyre, and their professional bond has made them good friends.
- D.C. Paula McIntyre (Emma Handy) is a lively and feisty young detective. She is keen to take on more responsibility and pleased to have strong role models in Carol and later, Alex. She has a deep respect for Hill after he saved her life while on the job.
- A.C.C. John Brandon (Tom Chadbon) (Series 1–2) is an excellent, experienced senior officer, but he is more concerned with ends than means. Brandon expects quick results from the team and from Jordan in particular, though he tries to back her as much as he can. In "Sharp Compassion", Brandon suffers a heart attack and nearly becomes a victim of a serial killer. Brandon appears in the first two series, although the character is featured in more numerous novels.
- A.C.C. Paul Eden, replaces Brandon from series three onwards. He is college-educated, fast-tracked and confident. Focused, tailored and practical, he demands tangible results. He is wary of Hill's more cerebral methods. He secretly hopes Fielding will not become as close to Tony as Jordan did.
- D.S. Don Merrick (Alan Stocks) (1–2), a persistent and perseverant officer. While generally conscientious, his temper occasionally leads to impulsive behaviour. At the end of series 2, Merrick assaults D.S. Geoffries after he compromises one of his closest informants. Merrick does not appear in any later episodes.
- D.S. Annie Reiss (Doreene Blackstock) (Series 1), an Afro-British detective who is part of Jordan's team. Reiss appears only in the first series, after which she is replaced by Paula McIntyre (Emma Handy) (Series 2–6).
- Dr. Ashley Vernon (Mark Penfold) (Series 1–5), the police medical examiner.
- Dr. Liam Kerwin (Michael Smiley) (Series 6), replaces Ashley Vernon in the sixth and final series.
- Tim Eccles (Jethro Skinner) (Series 3–5), the police's resident IT expert.

== Episodes ==
Only four episodes are based directly on McDermid's books: "The Mermaids Singing" and "Shadows Rising" from series one, "Torment" from series four, and "Falls the Shadow" from series six. The rest are original stories created for television.

=== Series overview ===
Series	Episodes	Originally released	
Series	Episodes	First released	Last released
1	3	14 November 2002	19 December 2002
2	4	12 February 2004	4 March 2004
3	4	21 February 2005	14 March 2005
4	4	20 September 2006	11 October 2006
5	5	11 July 2007	7 January 2008
6	4	12 September 2008	31 October 2008

=== Series 1 (2002) ===
Filming took place from 22 October 2001 to 14 February 2002 in various locations around Newcastle upon Tyne, Durham and Northumberland. These include Bollyhope Quarry (Durham), Chopwell Woods (Gateshead), and Eshott Hall (Northumberland), which was used for the Vance residence.

No. overall	No. in series	Title	Directed by	Written by	Original release date	British viewers (millions)
1	1	"The Mermaids Singing"	Andrew Grieve	Patrick Harbinson	14 November 2002 21 November 2002	8.08 6.15
Clinical psychologist Dr Tony Hill is asked to help police track down the brutal killer of three men in Bradfield. DI Carol Jordan hopes his skill as a profiler will crack the case, but Hill's off-beat methods cause others to dismiss him. When a cop is killed, the pressure for results mounts. Police focus on the gay scene, while Hill thinks the killer is sending a message on the body of his victim. Then the investigation takes a more personal turn.
2	2	"Shadows Rising"	Nicholas Laughland	Alan Whiting	28 November 2002 5 December 2002	6.38 7.59
When two teenagers' bodies are pulled from a Northumberland tarn, Dr Tony Hill immediately suspects a multiple killer. DI Carol Jordan is called to the home of popular chat show hosts Jack and Amanda Vance, who fear they are being stalked. As the dead girls are identified as suspected runaways, the attacks on the Vances escalate dramatically. Could the two investigations be connected?
3	3	"Justice Painted Blind"	Roger Gartland	Alan Whiting	12 December 2002 19 December 2002	6.93 7.18
The abduction of an 11-year-old girl and the strangulation of a young woman bring back memories of the murder of young Trudy Hibbert three years earlier. Known pedophile Paul Gregory was acquitted but police and locals fear he is killing again. Dr Tony Hill is convinced the attacks bear the hallmarks of a different killer—until a bizarre link suggests more deaths will follow.

=== Series 2 (2004) ===
The series was filmed in locations in and around Newcastle, including the main location of the old Bank of England building in Pilgrim Street, Newcastle. Also used: Finchale Priory, Durham Cathedral, Calder's Brewery near the Newcastle Arena, plus various temporary (daily) locations. Every episode of series two was the leader in its time slot.

No. overall	No. in series	Title	Directed by	Written by	Original release date	British viewers (millions)
4	1	"Still She Cries"	Andrew Grieve	Alan Whiting	12 February 2004	5.50
Tony Hill finds his work with the police compromised when a student from his university is abducted. But that's not his only worry—DCI Jordan stops trusting him when he allows one of his own pupils to help with the investigation.
5	2	"The Darkness of Light"	Nicholas Laughland	Alan Whiting	19 February 2004	6.20
Dr. Hill and DCI Jordan investigate when a 500-year-old skeleton is unearthed while foundations are being excavated for a hotel extension. But, underneath the remains, they find two more modern corpses. And when a journalist vanishes, and the hotel is burnt to the ground, Hill suspects the suspect may be obsessed with Joan of Arc and killing imagined heretics.
6	3	"Right to Silence"	Andrew Grieve	Jeff Povey	26 February 2004	6.20
Dr. Hill and DCI Jordan think they've scored early when two murders lead to one man. The trouble is that the man is in prison; could he really be controlling it all from the inside?
7	4	"Sharp Compassion"	Terry McDonagh	Niall Leonard	4 March 2004	6.00
Bradfield is in panic as someone preys on its most vulnerable—its hospital patients. DCI Jordan must juggle how to warn the public, and how to keep a predatory MI5 official at bay. The only way out is to solve the case fast—but there is very little to go on, even for Dr. Hill.

=== Series 3 (2005) ===
No. overall	No. in series	Title	Directed by	Written by	Original release date	British viewers (millions)
8	1	"Redemption"	Terry McDonagh	Guy Burt	21 February 2005	7.12
Dr. Hill suspects a killer is luring unhappy children to their deaths when the bodies of three boys are found in different locations in Bradfield. Each of the victims had suffered abuse. Could the killer believe he or she is righting wrongs and alleviating suffering by ending their lives? Hill and DCI Jordan's investigation closes in on the work of a local minister. With another child's life at stake, will they be able to ensnare the murderer?
9	2	"Bad Seed"	Alex Pillai	Niall Leonard	28 February 2005	7.94
When a series of brutal murders rocks the town, Dr. Hill becomes obsessed with the notion that they are the work of William 'Mack the Knife' MacAdam, newly released from prison. He is apparently reformed and keen to take Dr. Hill's place as a media pundit on serial killer cases.
10	3	"Nothing But the Night"	Andrew Grieve	Alan Whiting	7 March 2005	7.54
The murder of a woman, battered to death with a steam iron and ironing board, brings Dr. Hill back from a publicity tour for his latest book to join DCI Jordan's investigation. More bizarre but completely different deaths follow. Hill is baffled, unable to create a profile for a seemingly schizophrenic killer. As he is stalked by a Canadian woman he met on the book tour, Hill realises the investigators must focus on the relationships at work behind the crimes.
11	4	"Synchronicity"	Terry McDonagh	Niall Leonard	14 March 2005	7.10
Dr. Hill faces his own mortality when he is diagnosed with a brain tumour after being examined following a hit on the head by a criminal. While assisting DCI Jordan in an investigation into an anonymous sniper who is targeting victims in the city street, Hill's behaviour becomes more erratic. Jordan wonders if his health is making him unreliable. In a city gripped by fear, can random forces and chance save Dr. Hill—and help the team catch this unpredictable killer.

=== Series 4 (2006) ===
After Hermione Norris takes the role of Ros Myers in Spooks, she is written out of the series. Simone Lahbib joins the cast as her replacement, D.I. Alex Fielding. Jordan is said to have emigrated to South Africa for work.

No. overall	No. in series	Title	Directed by	Written by	Original release date	British viewers (millions)
12	1	"Time to Murder and Create"	Andy Goddard	Patrick Harbinson	20 September 2006	6.51
Dr. Hill is forced to face up to his past demons when evidence that he submitted against a murder suspect is torn apart by the man's legal team. Hill's world is rocked when he learns that DCI Jordan has left and been replaced by a new detective, the combative Alex Fielding. Although the two take an initial dislike to one another, they soon realize the need to work together to solve a complex murder case.
13	2	"Torment"	Declan O'Dwyer	Guy Burt	27 September 2006	6.04
Dr. Hill and DCI Fielding investigate the violent murder of a young prostitute. They find that their prime suspect was incarcerated in a high security psychiatric unit at the time. Suspecting a link to an ongoing Vice operation, Fielding teams up with squad detectives Shields & Mulligan. But when the next target becomes one of their own, Dr. Hill is forced to find the link between the killer and the outside world.
14	3	"Hole in the Heart"	A.J. Quinn	Niall Leonard	4 October 2006	6.07
Hill and Fieldiing investigate a serial killer who leaves behind a trail of two bodies at every crime scene. Hill suspects that the murderer may have a link to religious zealotry, but struggles to see beyond his own lack of personal faith and religious disinterest. When Fielding discovers the killings may be related to a disparate group intent on cleansing the human race, Hill has to change his thinking to crack the case.
15	4	"Wounded Surgeon"	Peter Hoar	Patrick Harbinson	11 October 2006	5.43
Dr. Hill comes under scrutiny from both the police and the media when it is revealed that he made a serious error of judgement in a case more than ten years ago. That resulted in an innocent man being convicted and imprisoned for a series of murders. As each and every one of his cases is torn apart, Dr. Hill realises he must find the real killer in order to prevent the loss of his work, which is most important to him.

=== Series 5 (2007) ===
Filming for this series took place between January 15 and April 20, 2007. Prayer of the Bone was filmed in and around Austin and La Grange, Texas in the United States.

No. overall	No. in series	Title	Directed by	Written by	Original release date	British viewers (millions)
16	1	"The Colour of Amber"	Peter Hoar	Alan Whiting	11 July 2007	6.26
When a young girl is abducted from a housing estate, DCI Fielding and Dr. Hill know they may have only hours to get her back alive. While Fielding launches an Amber alert—a massive public appeal—, Hill builds a profile of likely suspects. A distraught mother reports her daughter Janita as missing, but the Amber alert produces no information. Is the abduction all it seems?
17	2	"Nocebo"	Paul Whittington	Niall Leonard	18 July 2007	5.01
Fielding and Dr. Hill investigate the murders of two young children, whose deaths bear signs of a ritual killing. Their investigation leads them to a laboratory where they find evidence of animal sacrifice and paintings in blood. As the investigation turns personal, DC McIntyre and DS Geoffries find themselves under the influence of a curse, while Hill remains skeptical of the killer's ability.
18	3	"The Names of Angels"	Richard Standeven	Alan Whiting	25 July 2007	5.16
Dr. Hill is faced with a series of deadly puzzles when a killer rapes and strangles young female victims in Bradfield, but dresses and identifies them as young women he killed several years before in Europe. Why is he boasting to police about his past, leaving the bodies where they can easily be found? And why—and how—is he choosing confident, successful victims from the world of business, and killing them in Bradfield?
19	4	"Anything You Can Do"	Peter Hoar	Niall Leonard	1 August 2007	5.22
The murder of an elderly woman, suffocated in her own home, seems too deliberately staged to be an accident of robbery. And when DCI Fielding calls in Hill, he realizes that the killer will strike again. But could the deaths be connected to the sudden return of Dr. Hill's former hero, respected psychologist Jonathan Goode?
20	5	"Prayer of the Bone"	Peter Hoar	Patrick Harbinson	7 January 2008	6.66
Dr. Hill is in unfamiliar surroundings when he travels to Texas to assist the local district attorney in the case of Darius Grady, who is accused of murdering his wife and two children.

=== Series 6 (2008) ===
Series six began filming in early 2008 and wrapped on 30 March.

No. overall	No. in series	Title	Directed by	Written by	Original release date	British viewers (millions)
21	1	"Unnatural Vices"	Peter Hoar	Niall Leonard	12 September 2008 19 September 2008	5.93 5.11
Dr. Hill and DCI Fielding investigate theories of honour killings, fetishism and cannibalism when human remains are found in wasteland. New team member Collins gets inextricably drawn into the case and Hill begins a personal battle with a serial killer.
22	2	"Falls the Shadow"	Richard Curson Smith	Charlie Fletcher	26 September 2008 3 October 2008	5.03 5.18
Dr. Hill becomes the prime suspect in a murder inquiry after a female friend he meets at a psychology convention is killed. Meanwhile, Fielding is investigating a spate of prostitute murders—and Hill puts himself at risk trying to help.
23	3	"From the Defeated"	Declan O'Dwyer	Simon Block	10 October 2008 17 October 2008	5.07 5.03
Tony gets caught up hunting a serial killer who is brutally slaughtering young men, and doesn’t realise that convicted murderer Michael is planning to escape from the secure unit—with devastating consequences.
24	4	"The Dead Land"	Phillip John	Alan Whiting	24 October 2008 31 October 2008	5.10 4.80
Dr. Hill has to work with ambitious Oxbridge graduate DI Andy Hall when a killer starts targeting homeless men. Meanwhile, someone is stalking Hill. Could it be the cannibalistic serial killer, Michael?

== International broadcast ==
The series has been aired internationally: it appeared in the United States on the cable channel BBC America, in Australia on the public channel ABC, and in New Zealand on TV 1. As of May 2014, the show is screening on British televisions on the channel ITV3.

The show is available in the US on Hulu streaming service. It began running on Acorn TV in 2018. The show is also now available on the streaming service BritBox. The series is also available on Acorn TV in Canada in 2023.

== Home releases ==
Region 2 is distributed by Revelation Films, Region 1 by Koch Vision, and Region 4 by Magna. In 2019, Via Vision Entertainment obtained the rights to the series in Australia, Region 4.

DVD title	Release dates		
DVD title	Region 2	Region 1	Region 4
Wire in the Blood – The Complete Series 1	5 May 2003	22 June 2004	8 June 2004
Wire in the Blood – The Complete Series 2	5 March 2004	12 July 2005	9 September 2004
Wire in the Blood – The Complete Series 3	6 October 2006	7 February 2006	1 November 2005
Wire in the Blood – The Complete Series 4	22 October 2007	5 February 2008	9 April 2008
Wire in the Blood – The Complete Series 5	7 July 2008	10 June 2008	9 April 2008
Wire in the Blood – The Complete Series 6	2 March 2009	14 July 2009	3 March 2009
Wire in the Blood – The Complete Collection (Limited Edition)			4 January 2010
Wire in the Blood – Case Files: The Complete Collection			12 April 2010
Wire in the Blood – The Complete Series	30 November 2009	21 August 2013	16 November 2011
Wire in the Blood – Seasons 1–3			3 April 2019
Wire in the Blood – Seasons 4–6			6 June 2019
Wire in the Blood – The Complete Collection			1 January 2020

== Awards and nominations ==
Year	Ceremony	Awards	Ref.
2003	Royal Television Society Awards	Winner of 'Best Network Production'	
2005	Edgar Allan Poe Awards	'Best Television Feature or Mini-Series Teleplay' - Alan Whiting	
2006	Edgar Allan Poe Awards	'Best Television Episode Teleplay' - Guy Burt (Redemption)	
2009	Edgar Allan Poe Awards	Winner of 'Best Television Episode Teleplay' - Patrick Harbinson (Prayer of the Bone)	
2009	Television and Radio Industries Club Awards	Nominated: TV Crime Programme - Philip Leach	

== See also ==
- Karen Pirie
