= Dr. Tony Hill =

Fictional character

Tony Hill
- Robson Green as Dr Hill in the ITV adaptation Wire in the Blood
- First appearance: The Mermaids Singing
- Created by: Val McDermid
- Portrayed by: Robson Green

In-universe information
- Gender: Male
- Occupation: Psychologist
- Nationality: British

Dr Anthony ‘Tony’ Valentine Hill is a fictional character created by Scottish crime writer Val McDermid. He is portrayed by actor Robson Green in the ITV television series Wire in the Blood based on her Tony Hill and Carol Jordan series of novels.

== Biography ==
Dr Hill is a clinical psychologist who works as a profiler for the Home Office, and frequently Bradfield police; he specialises in repeat violent offenders, and has come into contact with a number of serial killers throughout his turbulent career. He has developmental coordination disorder and poor social skills, stemming partly from a childhood of emotional abuse.

He is often accompanied on his investigations by Detective Chief Inspector Carol Jordan, with whom he has a complicated relationship that takes on a personal as well as professional capacity. However, he avoids entering into a romantic relationship with her partly due to his issues with erectile dysfunction (impotence).

He is occasionally implied as having a difficult relationship with his mother, an emotionally detached businesswoman who bore her son while she was still young and unmarried, at a time when such a thing was considered scandalous. It is also revealed in Beneath The Bleeding that his grandmother used to shut him in a cupboard for long periods of time whenever he irritated her or did something wrong. Additionally, both his mother and grandmother used beatings as punishment for unintended childhood misdemeanours – when really, it appears that his grandmother's exception could be attributed to Tony's birth out of wedlock rather than justifiable instances of wrongdoing, and his mother resented his presence in her life. As a result, he can't stand arguing, having once said that it reminds him of being a child ("the grown-ups are shouting and it must be my fault").

His skill at profiling is attributed to his capacity to empathise with the criminals he pursues. Often he will make shrewd observations about a crime or person without thinking, which tends to cause embarrassment or (in some cases) outrage. His thought processes tend to dominate his life, to the point that he is blissfully ignorant of everyday details such as tucking in his shirt, turning off his car's headlights, etc. These eccentricities endear him to some (Carol Jordan in particular) while alienating him from others.

In the 2017 novel Insidious Intent Dr Hill is imprisoned for murder, having stabbed serial killer Tom Elton to prevent Carol Jordan from doing so.

== Methods ==
Tony tends to solve his cases using a mix of role-play, first person analysis and intuition. This approach often unsettles those around him and in the TV series, it isn't until Carol realises his worth in a practical setting that Bradfield CID embraces his ongoing assistance. Within the novels, Tony has an established professional standing that earns him a place at the head of the National Profiling Task Force after he conducted the feasibility study that resulted in its formation.

== Personality ==
In the TV series, Tony has admitted to having Asperger syndrome as well as being socially inept. He draws his satisfaction in life from analysing and understanding damaged minds, something that he often fears has affected him deeply – he refers to this in the novels as his attempts at "passing for human". There are numerous references in both TV and book canon to the spectre of his past and how he fears it leaves little distinction between him and the psychopaths he profiles. It appears that many of his ongoing issues and feelings of inadequacy can be traced to the negativity of his childhood and his early sexual experiences.

Tony often experiences vivid visions of the murdered victims during his cases, which he usually ignores, or at least never brings up when he sees them while surrounded by other people. Both in the books and the TV series. Tony is also seen talking to these visions in an attempt to understand the crimes, and sometimes is even seen acting out the murders in his mind, anything from imagining stabbing a housewife to death in Sharp Compassion to beating and shooting a young man in the head in From the Defeated. The question as to whether this is evidence of Tony's holistic genius in trying to understand the killer's motive or rather a more sinister psychological disturbance in his mind is left open to debate.

== TV series ==
The first episode of the television series Wire in the Blood, The Mermaids Singing, was broadcast on 14 November 2002 and co-starred Hermione Norris as Carol Jordan. Norris remained until series 4. Thereafter, the lead detective working with Hill was DI Alex Fielding, an ambitious single mother played by Simone Lahbib.

== See also ==
- List of fictional medical examiners
