= Bedlam =

Bedlam may refer to:

== Places ==
- Bethlem Royal Hospital, a London psychiatric institution and the historic origin for the word for chaos or madness
- Bedlam, North Yorkshire, a village in England
- Bedlam, Shropshire, a small hamlet in England
- Bedlam Theatre, a student-run theatre in Edinburgh

== Arts and media ==
=== Film and television ===
- Bedlam (1946 film), a thriller starring Boris Karloff
- Bedlam (2019 film), a documentary about mental health in the United States
- Bedlam (2011 TV series), a British supernatural drama
- Bedlam (2013 TV series), a documentary
- "Bedlam" (Pretty Little Liars), a 2016 TV episode

=== Literature ===
- Bedlam: London and Its Mad, a 2008 history book
- "Tom o' Bedlam", an anonymous poem written circa 1600
- Bedlam (Kennen novel), a 2009 young adult book
- Bedlam, a 1992 science fiction novel by John Brosnan
- Bedlam (Brookmyre novel), 2013
- Bedlam, a novel in the Skulduggery Pleasant series by Derek Landy
- Tom o' Bedlam, a character alias in the Shakespeare play King Lear
- Bedlam, a psychiatric hospital in the book Rebel Angels by Libba Bray
- The Bedlam, a mentally impaired character in the play The Roses of Eyam
- Bedlam (comics), a Marvel character

=== Music ===
- Bedlam, British 1970s rock band featuring Cozy Powell
- Bedlam, an early 1990s rock band fronted by Jay Joyce
- Bedlam, an American rap group formed in 1999 by Prozak
- Bedlam (EP), 2006, by Twilightning
- Bedlam, a 2016 album by Michale Graves
- "Bedlam", a song by The Bel-Airs
- "Bedlam in Belgium", a song by AC/DC from their 1983 album Flick of the Switch

=== Video games ===
- Bedlam (1982 video game), for the TRS-80
- Bedlam (1988 video game), from Beam Software
- Bedlam (1996 video game), from Mirage Technologies
- Bedlam (2015 video game), based on the Brookmyre novel
- Skyshine's Bedlam, a 2015 turn-based game for Windows and Mac

=== Other media ===
- UFC 85: Bedlam, a mixed martial arts pay-per-view event

== Other ==
- Insanity
- Bedlam, a nickname for Institute F.C.'s YMCA Grounds (or Riverside Stadium) in Northern Ireland
- Bedlam cube, a puzzle invented by Bruce Bedlam
- Bedlam Series, a sports rivalry between the University of Oklahoma and Oklahoma State University
