= List of fictional Scots =

Scottish characters in literature and other imaginative works

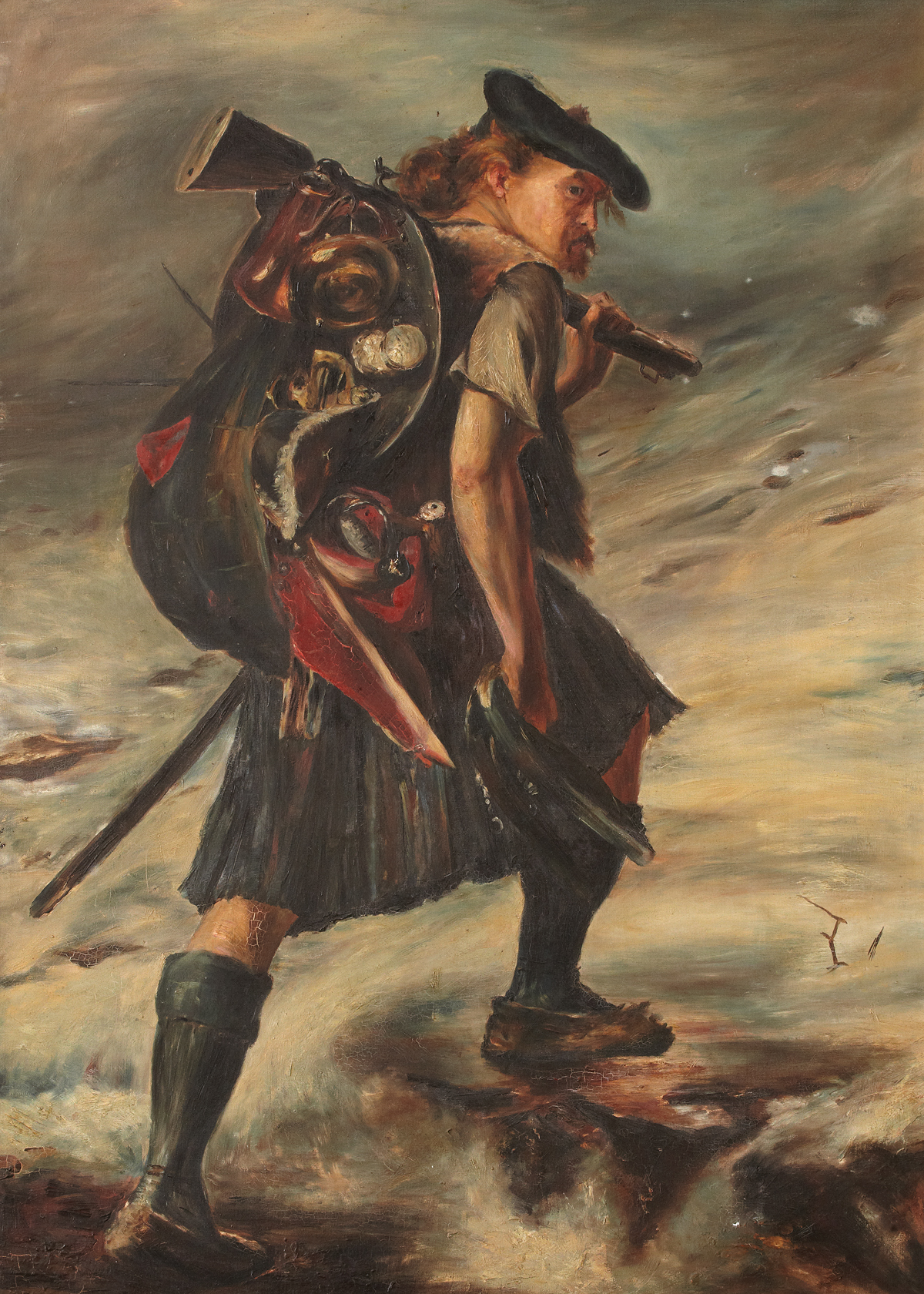
Disbanded by John Pettie was used to illustrate the 1893 edition of Waverley by Sir Walter Scott. The novel is set in the Jacobite uprising of 1745 and the picture shows a returning Highland warrior.

This is a list of Scottish characters from fiction.

Authors of romantic fiction have been influential in creating the popular image of Scots as kilted Highlanders, noted for their military prowess, bagpipes, rustic kailyard and doomed Jacobitism. Sir Walter Scott's Waverley novels were especially influential as they were widely read and highly praised in the 19th century. The author organised the pageantry for the visit of King George IV to Scotland which started the vogue for tartanry and Victorian Balmoralism which did much to create the modern Scottish national identity.

== Fictional Scottish characters ==
- Amy Pond is a companion of Doctor Who. The character was originally conceived as English but was changed to use the natural Inverness accent of the actress playing the part.
- Bella Caledonia (Scotland as a woman) invokes Scots iconography, including plaid, thistles, and the Forth Railway Bridge. She is an artificial woman, Bella Baxter, in Alasdair Gray's 1992 novel Poor Things.
- Jean Brodie, the titular character in The Prime of Miss Jean Brodie, exemplifies aspects of both Calvinist and Roman Catholic influence in Scotland.
- The Broons are a large, tenement-dwelling, extended family in the DC Thomson cartoon strip of the same name. The publisher's similar strips about the young lad, Oor Wullie, are set in the same fictional town of Auchenshoogle.
- Connor and Duncan MacLeod were immortal Highlanders in film and television.
- Donald Farfrae successfully romances the Mayor of Casterbridge's lover and daughter. Simultaneously "sentimental and astute", he is one of the earliest exemplars of Kailyardism.
- David Balfour is the central character of Kidnapped by Robert Louis Stevenson. This was based upon the Appin Murder and so many of the other characters, such as Alan Breck Stewart, were real people. The sequel, Catriona, is also known as David Balfour: Being Memoirs of His Adventures at Home and Abroad.
- Davy Jones is a villain in Disney’s Pirates of the Caribbean franchise. Initially asked to do a Dutch accent for the character, actor Bill Nighy instead decided to do a Scottish accent.
- Desmond Hume is a character from the ABC television show Lost. Henry Ian Cusick, the actor who portrays him, is of Peruvian and Scottish descent and was raised in Scotland.
- Donald and Douglas are twin engines from the Caledonian Railway in The Railway Series by Rev. Wilbert Awdry
- Dr. Finlay is the central character of stories by A. J. Cronin, set in the fictional village of Tannochbrae. Other characters included partner Dr Cameron, housekeeper Janet McPherson and rival Dr Snoddie. The television productions have been seen as an example of modern Kailyardism.
- Fat Bastard is a grotesquely fat Scotsman in the Austin Powers comedies.
- Fingal is the hero of The Poems of Ossian by James Macpherson. Notable features such as Fingal's Cave are named after him.
- Groundskeeper Willie is a well-loved character in The Simpsons. He has flaming red hair and a powerful, muscular body. A 2007 study conducted in the US concluded that Willie was the character that US residents "...most believe personifies the Scottish temperament."
- Jack Parlabane is the journalist hero of the novels by Christopher Brookmyre such as Quite Ugly One Morning.
- James Bond - following the success of Sean Connery in the role, author Ian Fleming gave Bond a mixed parentage - a Scottish father and Swiss mother. This background gave the character a colonial perspective, being an outsider in England.
- Jamie Fraser is the Laird of Broch Tuarach in the Outlander stories.
- Jamie McCrimmon is an early companion of Doctor Who. He was a piper and wore a kilt.
- Lobey Dosser is the Sheriff of Calton Creek – an Arizona town loosely based on the Calton district of Glasgow and populated by Glaswegians. The cartoon strip by Bud Neill was a popular feature in the Glasgow Evening Times from 1949 to 1956 and is now commemorated by statues.
- Mr. Mackay is the stern prison officer in Porridge which also featured McClaren as a black Scottish inmate and hard man.
- Malcolm Tucker is the aggressive, profane and feared Director of Communications in the BBC Comedy The Thick of It. He was played by Peter Capaldi, who is a Glaswegian, but who actually based the character on the behaviour of Hollywood agents and producers such as Harvey Weinstein.
- Marvel Comics has a number of Scottish characters, including mutant geneticist Moira Mactaggert, her son Proteus, her adopted daughter Wolfsbane, government agent siblings Alistaire and Alysande Stuart, and Excalibur member Kylun.
- Minerva McGonagall is the head of Gryffindor house in the Harry Potter stories. She was named after the notorious Scottish poet William McGonagall.
- Minnie the Minx is a mischievous tomboy with red hair, tam o' shanter and striped jersey. She is one of the longest-running characters in The Beano and there is a statue of her in Dundee.
- Nicholas Rush is a scientist in Stargate Universe.
- John Rebus is the protagonist of the Inspector Rebus stories by Ian Rankin.
- Montgomery Scott is the chief engineer in Star Trek, famous for the alleged catchphrase, "Beam me up, Scotty". The actor, James Doohan, was Canadian and auditioned with a variety of accents but suggested that Scottish would be best for the character, following the long tradition of Scottish nautical engineering. Producer Gene Roddenberry liked the accent and so it was settled.
- Para Handy is the captain of a puffer on the Clyde in stories by Neil Munro, which have been filmed many times. His crew included Dan Macphail, Dougie, Hurricane Jack, Sunny Jim and The Tar.
- Private Frazer is the miserly undertaker in Dad's Army who comes from the bleak Isle of Barra in the Outer Hebrides.
- Rab C. Nesbitt is a dissolute Glaswegian in the eponymous comedy.
- Redgauntlet is a novel by Sir Walter Scott which contains numerous Scottish characters including the Laird of Redgauntlet, hero Darsie Latimer and musician Wandering Willie.
- Richard Hannay is a stalwart of the British Empire in the stories by John Buchan. He was born in Edinburgh like his real-life inspiration, the spy and general Edmund Ironside.
- Scrooge McDuck is the uncle of Disney's Donald Duck in a comics, film and TV where he is a billionaire businessman and treasure hunter. He was honoured by Glasgow council as a famous Glaswegian. He was inspired by real life Andrew Carnegie and fictional Ebenezer Scrooge. His arch-enemy is Flintheart Glomgold, a kilt-wearing corrupt businessman.
- Shrek, although possessing a German name and being an ogre (thought to be a medieval stereotype of Hungarians), was portrayed as Scottish by Mike Myers in the Shrek film series.
- Super Gran is a grandmother with super powers in books written by Forrest Wilson. In the television adaption, she was played by actress Gudrun Ure.
- Jim Taggart is the title character of the successful television drama about a Glaswegian detective, played by Mark McManus. The title persisted even after the lead character was killed off following McManus' death.
- Tam Lin is a knight in thrall to the Queen of Faerie in the ballad of that name.
- Tam O'Shanter is the title character of the celebrated poem by Robert Burns - a drunken rustic.
- Tavish Finnegan DeGroot aka The Demoman from Team Fortress 2, one of the 9 playable classes from the game, a demolitions expert originating from Ullapool, Scotland.
- Several Scots stock characters are present in Brigadoon, first staged on Broadway in 1947. They are variously warriors, drunkards, overly thrifty as a result of Calvinism, or capable of unusual insights stemming from a close relationship to the natural world.

== Real and apocryphal Scots who have been extensively fictionalised or mythologised ==
The Execution of Mary Stuart was the first movie to use a special effect. (click ▶ to play)

- Bonnie Prince Charlie, the Jacobite young Pretender who appears in novels such as Redgauntlet.
- The Loch Ness Monster was sighted in 1933. Its existence has not been proven but it has since appeared in numerous fictional forms.
- Macbeth as in Shakespeare's play.
- Mary, Queen of Scots, commonly portrayed as a romantic and tragic heroine.
- Rob Roy MacGregor as in Rob Roy.
- Sir Patrick Spens, heroic captain of a doomed voyage for the King of Scotland.
- Thomas the Rhymer, a 13th-century prophet and poet who, in ballad, is led by the Queen of Faerie to Elfland.
- William Wallace as in Braveheart.

== See also ==
- List of Scots
- Scottish mythology
