= One Fine Day in the Middle of the Night =

1999 novel by Christopher Brookmyre

- First edition
- Author: Christopher Brookmyre
- Language: English
- Genre: Satire, Crime, heist, black humour
- Publisher: Little, Brown
- Publication date: 1999
- Publication place: United Kingdom
- Media type: Print (Hardback & (Paperback)
- ISBN: 978-0-8021-3980-1
- OCLC: 51511046
- Dewey Decimal: 823/.914 21
- LC Class: PR6052.R58158 O54 2003
- Preceded by: Not the End of the World
- Followed by: Boiling a Frog

One Fine Day in the Middle of the Night (1999) is the fourth novel by Scottish writer Chris Brookmyre.

== Plot ==
Gavin Hutchinson, purveyor of non-threatening holidays to the British masses has organised a reunion for his old school classmates. The reunion will take place on his latest project - a unique "floating holiday experience" on a converted North Sea oil rig, a haven for tourists who want a vacation in the sun but without the hassle of actually interacting with any foreigners. And what better way to test out his venture than to host a fifteenth-year high school reunion, the biggest social event of his life... except no one remembers who Gavin is.

Gavin may have been a non-entity while at school in Auchenlea, but now that he's made his fortune, he's looking forward to lording it over his old classmates, especially now he's having an affair with Catherine O'Rourke, PR specialist and one-time pin-up for his male classmates at St Michael's.

Meanwhile, Gavin's wife, Simone Draper, remains much more memorable to those from Auchenlea than her husband. She is fed up with his philandering and aims to use the evening to publicly embarrass Gavin by announcing her plans to take the twins and leave him. Intent on ruining Gavin's evening, she's also added two extra names to the guest list - Hollywood star, famous comedian (and the recently suicidal) Matt Black, as well as class bampot, though now reformed artist, David "Dilithium Dave" Murdoch.

As the ex-classmates gather on the almost finished holiday resort, currently moored off the coast of Scotland, little do they know that a troop of would be mercenaries/soldiers of fortune have been contracted to hit the rig for some blackmail action.

The group of mercenaries (mostly originally recruited from the minimum wage end of the labour market, and already reduced in number due to some experiments with a rocket launcher) are made up of a variety of ex-terrorists from Ulster and Africa mixed in with a few professionals and to say they're not getting on well is a bit of an understatement...

== Characters ==
Hector McGregor
Recently retired police officer, also appeared in Quite Ugly One Morning.

Matt Black
A successful yet highly cynical stand-up comedian, who's recently sold out by appearing in very bad US sitcoms.

Ally McQuade
Genial tradesman with an easily upset stomach.

Tim "Death's Dark" Vale
Security expert, who also turns up in a couple of Brookmyre's other novels, Be My Enemy and Country of the Blind.

David Murdoch
Reformed ex-con and general bampot, turned self-aware artist.

Gavin Hutchinson
Unmemorable owner of the holiday resort, who's sporting a large chip on his shoulder to balance out his equally large ego.

Simone Hutchinson née Draper
Gavin's long suffering wife.

Catherine O'Rourke
PR consultant and Gavin's bit on the side.

William Connor
Would be purveyor of 'professional' mercenary services
