= Not the End of the World (Brookmyre novel) =

1998 novel by Christopher Brookmyre

- Author: Christopher Brookmyre
- Language: English
- Genre: Satire, crime fiction, detective fiction, black humour
- Publisher: Little, Brown
- Publication date: 1998
- Publication place: United Kingdom
- Media type: Print (hardcover & paperback)
- ISBN: 9780316640657 (hardcover first edition)
- OCLC: 40059177
- Dewey Decimal: 823/.914 21
- LC Class: PR6052.R58158 N68 1998
- Preceded by: Country of the Blind
- Followed by: One Fine Day in the Middle of the Night

Not the End of the World is Christopher Brookmyre's third novel, and the first not to feature Jack Parlabane, Christopher Brookmyre's most used character. The novel is also the first book Brookmyre has written that is based solely outside of the United Kingdom. The story takes place in Los Angeles.

== Plot introduction ==
LAPD cop Larry Freeman is given the task of 'baby-sitting' a B-movie film festival as a way of easing himself back into work after the death of his son, but things soon turn violent when a right-wing Christian group targets ex-porn actress Madeline Witherson. As Larry investigates the attacks on Maddy and the disappearance of an oceanic survey vessel it becomes clear that certain parties are not content to wait for the Apocalypse.

== Characters ==
Larry Freeman
Los Angeles Police Department police officer. He has recently returned to his job after the death of his son. Previously mentioned in Brookmyre's book Quite Ugly One Morning where he gives Jack Parlabane a gun which ends up saving his life.
Madeline Witherson
Former adult actress who now stars in Hollywood B-Movies. She meets Steff during a photoshoot for her new movie. She is the victim of several right-wing religious attacks at the film festival the book surrounds.
Steff Kennedy
Scottish photographer from Motherwell. Has long blonde hair and suffers greatly from jet-lag in the book. Has a romantic relationship with Madeline Witherson in the book and helps investigate the attacks against her. Steff also appears in Brookmyre's book A Big Boy Did It and Ran Away. In that book he was the photographer for a band's album sleeve; he photographs band members again in Dead Girl Walking.
