= Bud Neill =

Scottish cartoonist

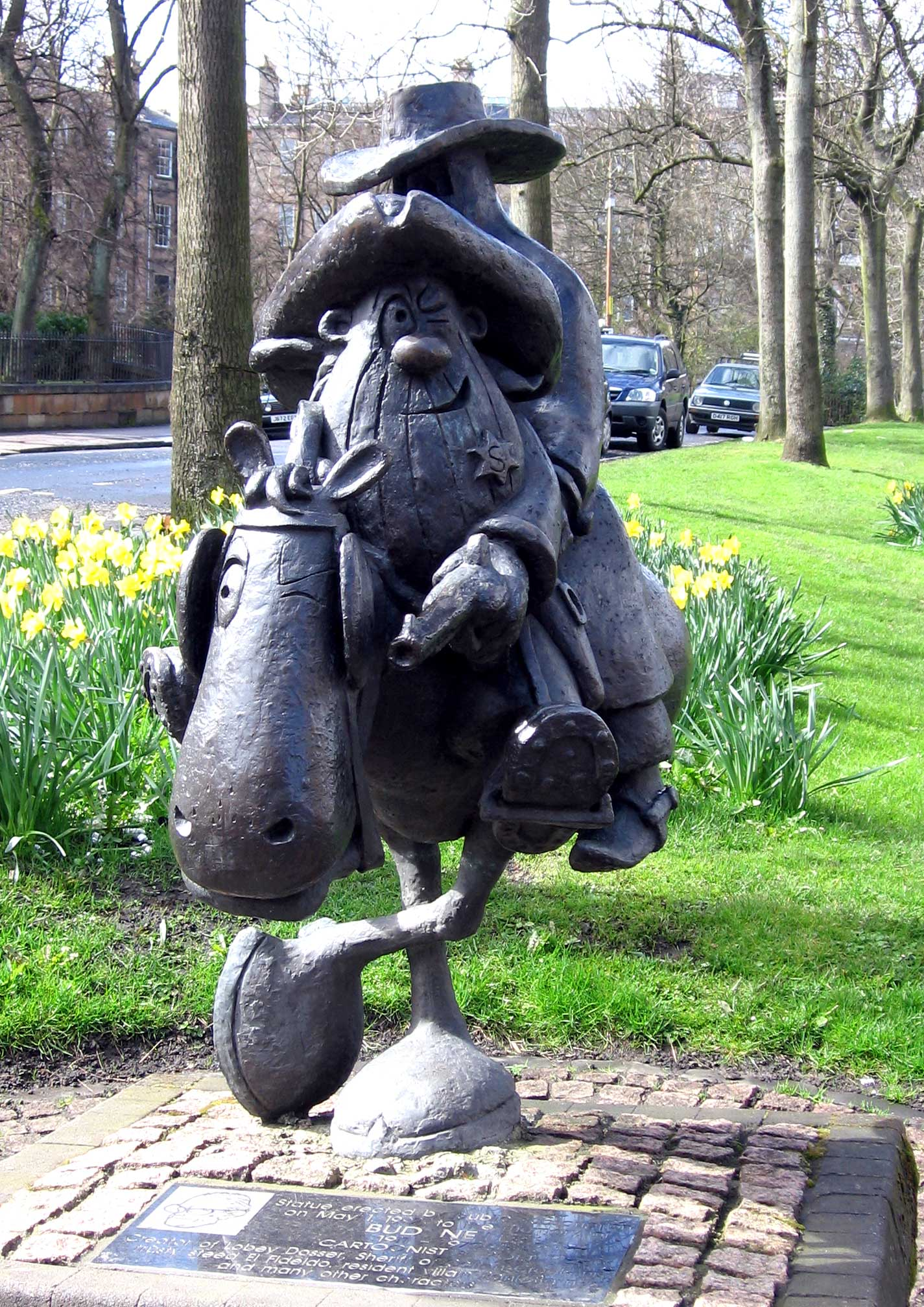
Bud Neill's legacy: Lobey Dosser and Rank Bajin, astride Elfie, the only two legged horse in The West.

William "Bud" Neill (5 November 1911–28 August 1970) was a Scottish cartoonist who drew cartoon strips for a number of Glasgow-based newspapers between the 1940s and 1960s. Following his death, his work has attained cult status with a worldwide following.

== Early life ==
Born as William Neill in Partick, he moved with his family shortly thereafter to Troon in Ayrshire. (He is not to be confused with William Neill, the poet, also from Ayrshire originally). Growing up there, the young Neill would spend his Saturdays at the local cinema, and was particularly enthralled by the adventures of silent movie Western star William S. Hart. These experiences fuelled Neill's childhood imagination, and proved to be a formative influence for his future career.

His other great passion in childhood was a love of horses. When not watching the stars of the silver screen, Neill would often be found at the local stables where he bartered some mucking out and grooming duties in return for the opportunity to ride the horses. After leaving school, where he excelled at art, he returned to Glasgow and enrolled for a course in commercial art at Glasgow School of Art.

== Professional career ==
In the late 1930s Neill lived and worked in Canada for a year. He learnt a great deal from the experience, observing the sophistication of the North American newspaper cartoonists. On his return to Scotland he served as a gunner in the Second World War, but was injured and invalided out of the service. Back in Glasgow, he took up temporary employment as a bus driver. His experiences there led him to develop a series of "pocket cartoons" depicting the city's "caurs" (tramcars) and their "clippies" (female conductors).

In 1944 Neill commenced a series of cartoons for the Glasgow Evening Times, themed around Glasgow life. His wry observational humour focused on local wartime attitudes, and plundered the rich resource of the Glasgow vernacular. They frequently featured "wee wifies", in the early cartoons gossiping about the war ("They tell me yon yin Hitler's a richt bad rascal an' a'...") and victory ("if ye ask me, they'll never catch him. He'll tak' yin o' his Luftwuffy airyplanes and scram tae Thibet or Edinbury.."). In later cartoons they discussed their wean (one clutching her girning [crying] baby says "It's his teeth, aye. Awfy crabbit. Like a bear wi' nae fags." ) and went "doon the watter" on Clyde steamers for their holidays: one irritating a smartly dressed man in yachting blazer and officer's cap by quizzing him "Yaffayat? Whityatyaffa?".

Neill's most famous characters first appeared in the Evening Times cartoon strip in January 1949. Sheriff Lobey Dosser of Calton Creek was a memorable series that ran in the newspaper until 1956. Further adventures were published in the Sunday Mail in the late 1950s. The strip was extremely popular with Glaswegians and it merged the adventurous style of the silent era western movies with traditional Glasgow stage humour, particularly pantomime. The outrageous puns and surrealistic drawings have endured over time and now attract a cult following.

The G.I. Bride frequently featured in the pocket cartoons, and became a long running character in the Lobey Dosser series, always standing in Arizona with her "wean" in her arms (her baby, prophetically called Ned), invariably trying to thumb a ride with plaintive cries like "Ony o' youse blokes goin' the length o' Pertick?". (A bronze statue of the G.I. Bride is now in Partick Station, (Rail and Underground), commissioned by SPT and sculpted by Ranald MacColl.) Neill was a regular theatregoer at the time, and this character was probably inspired by Tommy Morgan's popular stage character, Big Beenie, the G.I. War Bride. The popularity of the Glasgow stage comedian's pantomime-style parodies of the city's culture was not lost on Neill, and was to influence his best known cartoon strip.

== Lobey Dosser ==
The main characters, Lobey Dosser and Rank Bajin, as depicted in one of the early cartoon strips.

The fictional Calton Creek (Calton is a district of Glasgow) was an outpost of the wild west, supposedly located somewhere in Arizona, but its inhabitants were all Glaswegians from the Calton area and spoke with Glasgow accents. "Lobey Dosser" was the pint-sized, whiskered Sheriff of Calton Creek who, assisted by "El Fideldo" (Elfie), his resourceful two-legged horse, strove to maintain law and order and protect the citizens against the evil plans of "Rank Bajin" ("rank bad yin/one"). The character names drew heavily on the Glasgow vernacular and were often only comprehensible to Glaswegians.

Given Neill's childhood exposure to early Westerns, and his passion for wartime theatre and pantomime, it was no surprise that the Lobey strips exhibited many of those genre's stylistic devices: depiction of good and evil as white and black respectively, the overblown evil machinations of "Rank Bajin" and the rhyming speech of "Fairy Nuff" are good examples. The compliment was repaid in the early 1950s when a Lobey sketch was included in a production of Little Red Riding Hood at the Citizen's Theatre in Glasgow.

=== Main characters ===
- Lobey Dosser - Sheriff of Calton Creek. (The name is derived from "lobby dosser", meaning a lodger who, unable to afford a bed, paid a small amount to sleep in the lobby (entryway) of a tenement flat).
- El Fideldo (Elfie) (Spanish for faithful) -The Sheriff's trusty two-legged and, occasionally, talking horse.
- Rank Bajin - Calton Creek's resident villain. (The name refers to "rank bad yin", "rank" being a Glaswegian term for rotten, and "yin" being Glaswegian for "one"). Bajin is the only main character in the strip who speaks with a standard middle-class English accent, while the other cartoon characters have a Glaswegian dialect, as they are all immigrants from the Calton.
- Big Chief Toffy Teeth - Chief of a Pawnee tribe that originated somewhere in Govan.
- Rid Skwerr - official haunter of the local cemetery, betrothed to Fairy Nuff. (A ghostly ex-spy, his name is a Glaswegian rendering of "Red Square".) He is a reference to the USSR/West Cold War.
- Chief Rubber Lugs - Chief of a Blackfeet tribe, apparently from New Jersey, and in dispute with the Pawnee.
- Fairy Nuff - A fairy who wears "tacketty boots" and speaks mostly in panto-style rhyme.

Other characters include:

- Pawnee Mary o' Argyll - Big Chief Toffee Teeth's daughter, whose name refers to the song "Bonny Mary of Argyle" about Mary Campbell (Highland Mary).

== Legacy ==
The immense popularity of Neill's work led to the Lobey Dosser stories being published as small one shilling booklets and, a decade after the strip ended, he was still getting enquiries from around the world from fans desperately trying to purchase one of these increasingly rare volumes. By the mid 1970s, Glasgow artist Ranald MacColl had begun collecting material for a biography. The Daily Express closed its Glasgow print works and dozens of bin bags of Neill's original work were thrown out. Fortunately, another local artist Calum MacKenzie, Director of The Glasgow Print Studio and Gallery, found and saved some of the works, which eventually were exhibited in the exhibition The Scottish Cartoonists (1979). During Glasgow's European Year of Culture, Ranald MacColl organised a comprehensive exhibition of Bud's work, including unpublished pieces, at Glasgow's Art Galleries and Museum. Julian Spalding, the Director at this period, pronounced the show one of the most popular of that year.

=== The statue ===
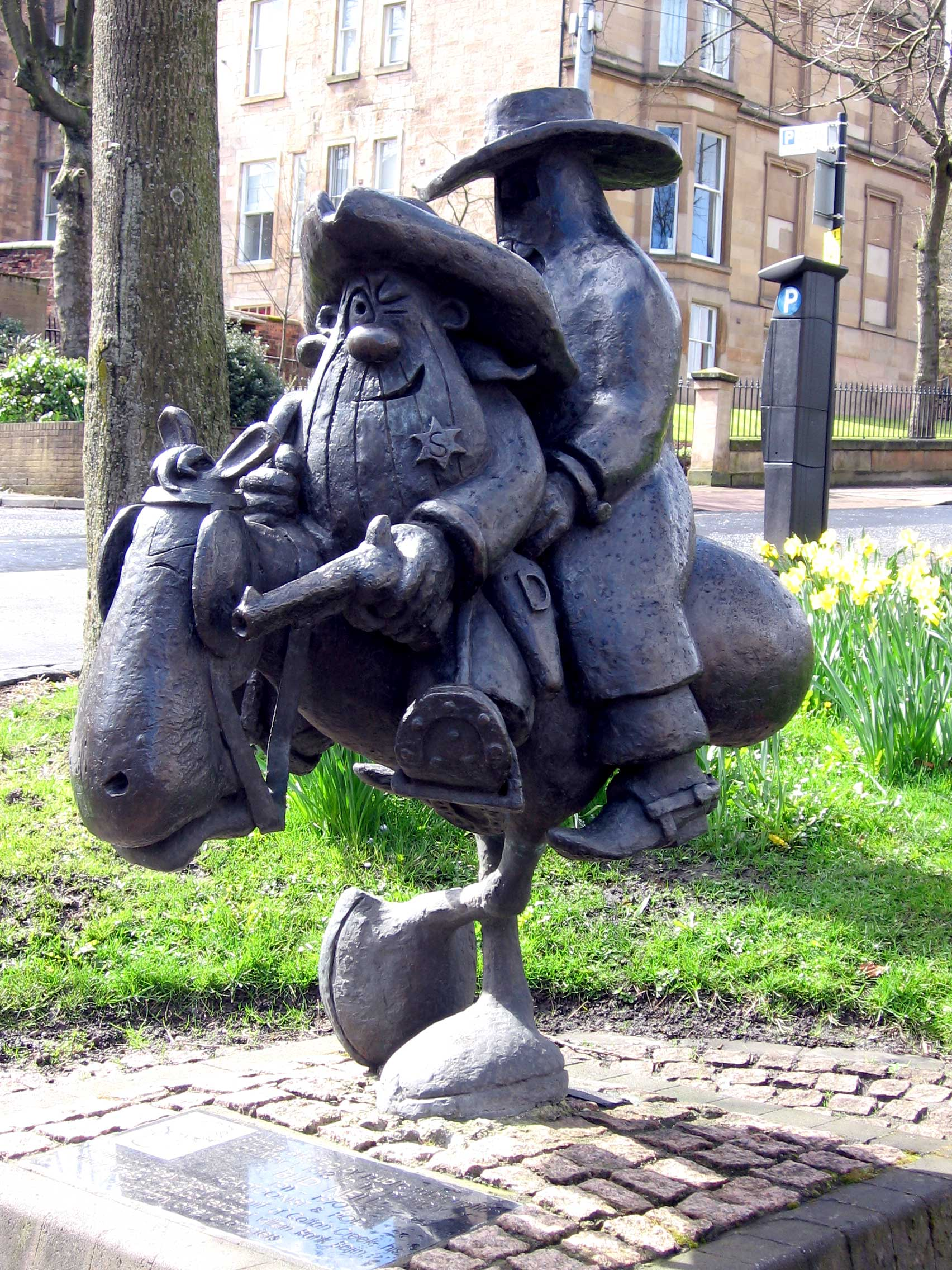
The statue of "Lobey" with "Rank Bajin" in handcuffs, astride two-legged "El Fideldo".

The Lobey legend has proven to be Neill's enduring legacy to Glasgow, and has been marked by the erection of a bronze statue in Woodlands Road, across from The Finsbay Flatiron Bar. The idea came up in that location in 1989 during discussion between the artist and stained glass designer Calum MacKenzie and friends about Glasgow's 1990 European City of Culture status, and the statue was funded by donations following an appeal in the Glasgow Herald. Ranald MacColl drew up the crosslegged Elfie/Lobey/Rank statue concept and art students Tony Morrow and Nick Gillon sculpted and erected the statue in 1992 which features "Lobey" and "Rank Bajin" astride "El Fideldo". The statue has the unique distinction of being the world's only two-legged equestrian monument.

The inscription on the plaque below the statue reads:

Statue erected by public subscription on 1 May 1992 to the memory of Bud Neill, 1911-1970, cartoonist & poet, creator of Lobey Dosser, Sheriff of Calton Creek, his sturdy steed El Fideldo, resident villain Rank Bajin, and many other characters.

The statue has been subjected to occasional vandalism, and is often seen adorned with a traffic cone after weekend revellers have passed by, something that has come to be known as the traditional headwear of the Glasgow statue. In April 2016, the statue had to be removed for repairs after reportedly being vandalised by "rank badyins".

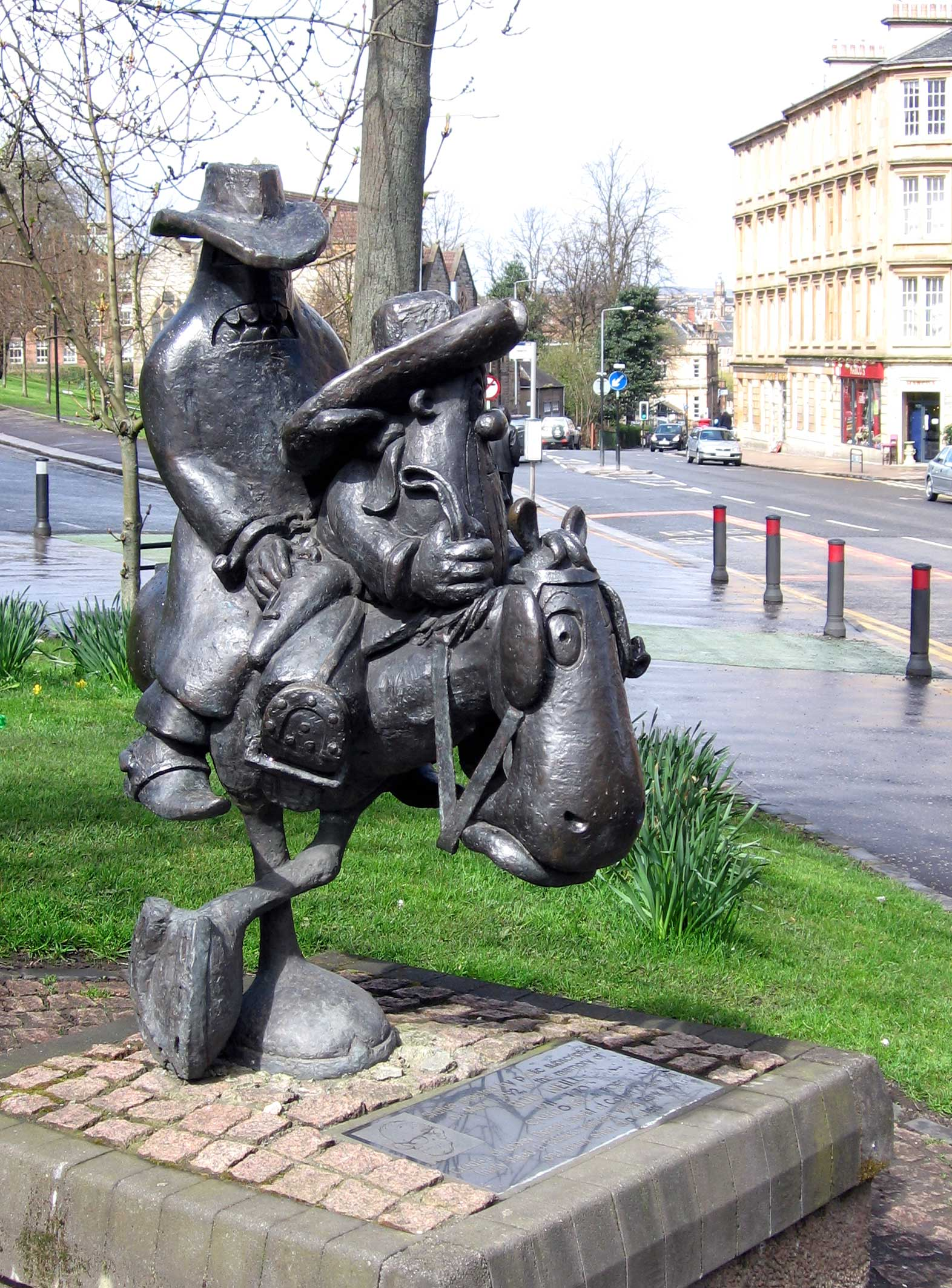
View along Woodlands Road: Bajin's up to tricks!

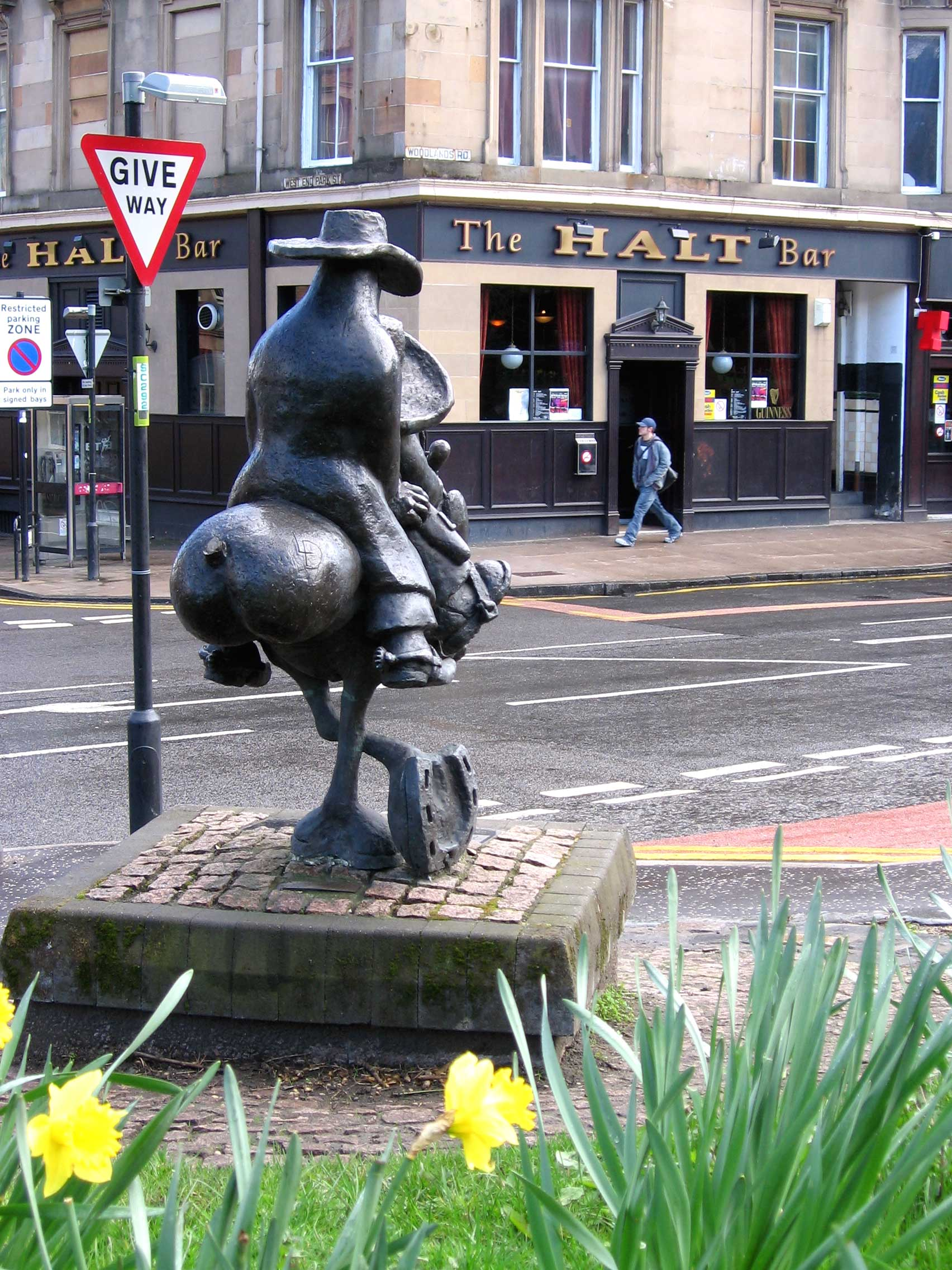
The statue, watching over The Halt Bar.

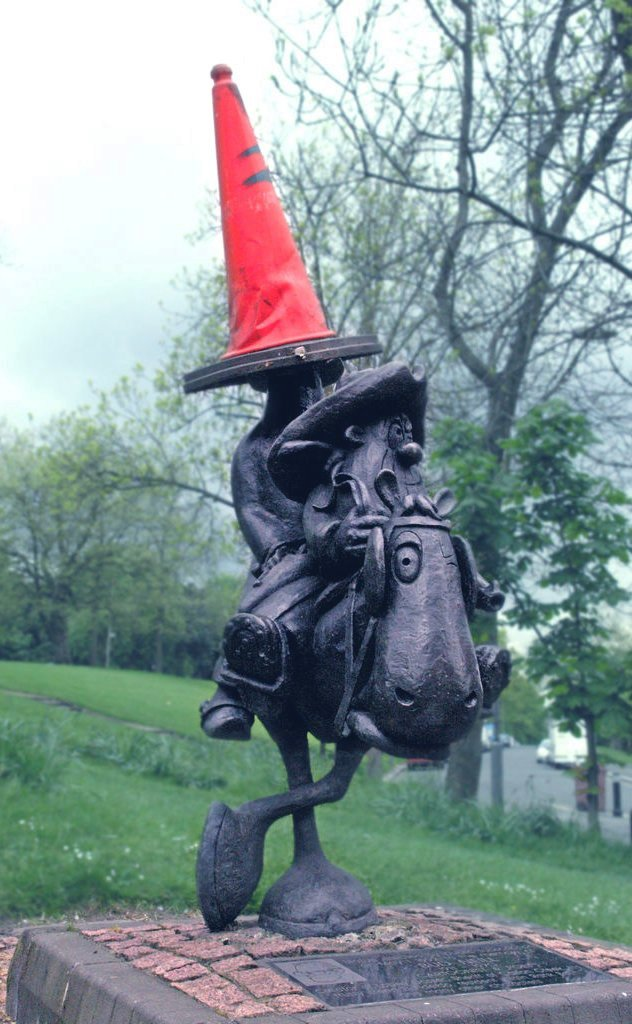
The statue, sporting a traffic cone.

=== The G.I. Bride Statue at Partick Station ===
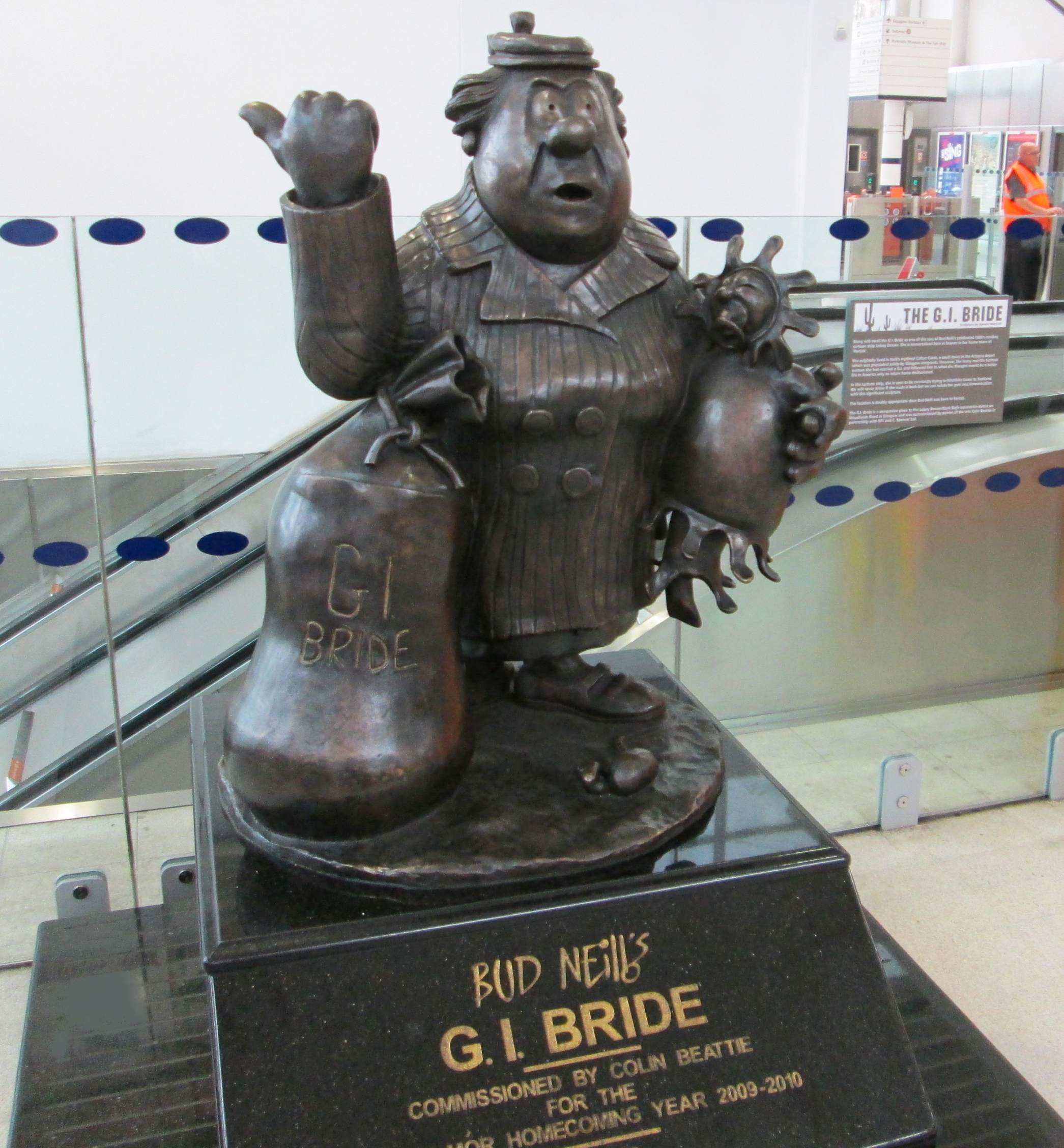
Sculpture of the G.I. Bride character (with her baby Ned), erected in Partick station in 2011.

As part of the events for Homecoming Scotland 2009, Strathclyde Passenger Transport (in conjunction with a private sponsor) commissioned a bronze statue of the G.I. Bride and her "wean", for the newly renovated Partick railway station. The sculptor was again Ranald MacColl, an artist/designer and avid fan of Neill's work who had compiled/published three books of his work in the past. The underlying idea of the work and its installation was the eventual homecoming of the G.I. Bride on the official Homecoming Year.

=== Mural ===
In 2017, a new mural was added overlooking the Calton area of Glasgow. It is situated on the wall of Bill's Tool Store on Bain Street G40.

=== References in popular culture ===
Glaswegian author Christopher Brookmyre made reference to some of Bud Neill's characters, as well as the statue, in his 2001 novel A Big Boy did it and Ran Away and again in his 2008 novel A Snowball in Hell. Simon Darcourt, the main antagonist in both books is a terrorist who is known to the Police as The Black Spirit and leaves "calling cards" bearing the image of Rank Bajin at the scenes of his massacre

== Re-publication ==
Also in 1992, Ranald MacColl published Lobey's the Wee Boy! reprinting five of the rare shilling booklets together with a brief biography. The stories are set in a logical order rather than in the order they appeared in the newspaper, and start with Lobey's tale of how he came to Arizona as a runaway baby on a pirate ship. This includes his adventures on a desert island meeting "cannibals" ("He cannibal-eve it!") who turn out to be from Clydebank and take him on an expedition during which they find a rare herd of two-legged horses. When a wee horse is "stunned wi' fallin" ("Haw, there a wee foal fell, well!") and is rescued by Lobey, the two become inseparable. Less publicly, Neill modestly claimed that Elfie began because four legs were too much trouble to draw.

MacColl's books give the background to the cartoons.

This book was followed by Bud Neill's Magic!, again with biographical notes, and with a selection from the many pocket cartoons, showing their changing subjects and styles over the years. Further Adventures of the Wee Boy tells the story of the bronze statue in a foreword, and reprints a further five of the shilling booklets. These stories are patchy in style, including some where more realistically drawn characters mix with his cartoon figures, but give more examples of Neill's quirky humour and fine touch with pen and lamp-black ink.

== See also ==
- Glasgow's public statues
- List of famous Glaswegians
- Commons:Category:Lobey Dosser (additional pictures of statue)
