= A Big Boy Did It and Ran Away =

2001 novel by Christopher Brookmyre

- First edition
- Author: Christopher Brookmyre
- Language: English
- Genre: Satire, Crime, Detective, black humour
- Published: 2001 (Little Brown, London)
- Publication place: United Kingdom
- Media type: Print (Hardback & (Paperback)
- ISBN: 0-316-85743-2
- OCLC: 47194021
- LC Class: PR6052.R58158 B54 2001
- Preceded by: Boiling a Frog
- Followed by: The Sacred Art of Stealing

A Big Boy Did It and Ran Away (2001) is Christopher Brookmyre's sixth novel, the first book in a suspense trilogy featuring policewoman Angelique de Xavia. She is the central character in The Sacred Art of Stealing (2002) and the main protagonist in A Snowball in Hell (2008). Her antagonist in this novel, Simon Darcourt, reappears in A Snowball in Hell, where their relationship is resolved. A Big Boy touches on a number of Brookmyre's interests, including gaming, rock and roll (especially Glaswegian), and childhood.

== Plot summary ==
Anti-terrorist forces are put on alert when it is learned that the notorious international terrorist the Black Spirit plans to attack on an unknown British target on Saturday, September 6. The Black Spirit is an ingenious terrorist-for-hire known for his clever, often indirect means of achieving destruction; the terrorist organizations that hire him then claim the hit. He himself, however, claims his kills by leaving a literal "calling card," an image of the comic figure Rank Badjin by the Glasgow cartoonist Bud Neill.

Meanwhile, 30-something Raymond Ash is struggling to cope with the banality of his new life, having sold his video game shop and decided to settle down with his wife, a new baby, and a new career as an English teacher in Glasgow. While visiting Glasgow airport he sees his college friend Simon Darcourt, who supposedly died when terrorists blew up an airliner a few years before. He has no idea that Darcourt is in reality the Black Spirit. Darcourt for his part sees Raymond and decides to settle an old score with him by incorporating him into his terrorist plot.

Raymond ends up being abducted by Darcourt's terrorists, along with a couple of 13-year-old boys from his school (whose presence is unknown to the gang). Raymond escapes, then finds himself aiding Glasgow policewoman Angelique de Xavia in a valiant attempt to foil their plot, the two being the only people with a chance of reaching the site of the attack in time – the (fictional) Highlands hydroelectric plant at Dubh Ardrain.

== Characters ==
Point-of-view characters:

Angelique de Xavia
Glasgow Police Detective Inspector. She is a Glaswegian, born to Ugandan refugees of Asian ethnicity, who has always felt herself an outsider. She is an expert in several martial arts and is known for her temper.
Simon Darcourt
Once an aspiring rock star in bands where his narcissism alienated his fellow musicians, he discovered that planning and executing murders in ingenious ways was very satisfying, and eventually became an important international terrorist-for-hire. His intelligent, articulate, and complete contempt for his fellow man provides the blackest humor in the novel. His name, like that of Jack Parlabane in other novels by Brookmyre, is derived from a character in Robertson Davies's novel The Rebel Angels.
Raymond Ash
30-something newbie English teacher and exhausted father of a new baby. He was a college friend (and admirer) of Simon Darcourt, and the drummer in the first band Simon tried to front. Brookmyre, whose novel Bedlam (2013) was actually turned into a video game, uses Ash to explore the value of first-person-shooter gaming, integrating Ash's experience as a child imagining enemies, his experience fighting terrorists in Dubh Ardrain, and his gaming skills.
Lexy and Wee Murph
Two boys from Raymond’s school who stow away in the terrorists’ truck, figure out the nature of the plot, and sabotage it. Their dialogue is phonetically spelled. They recall the children in Brookmyre’s A Tale Etched in Blood and Hard Black Pencil, (2006), transported to a fantasy adventure.

== Reception ==
The novel originally appeared with the cheerful tagline, "Terrorism - It's The New Rock'n'Roll," but the events of September 11, 2001 completely changed the potential of a black comedy based on a terrorist attack on Saturday, September 6.
