= Badlam =

Badlam is a surname. Notable people with this surname include:

- Alexander Badlam (1809 – 1894), an American Mormon leader
- Stephen Badlam (1751 – 1815), an American artisan and military officer

== See also ==
- John Badlam Howe Mansion, a historic house in Howe, Indiana
- Bedlam (disambiguation)
