= City of Sin: London and Its Vices =

2010 book by Catharine Arnold

City of Sin: London and its vices
- Cover of the first edition
- Author: Catharine Arnold
- Language: English
- Subject: History of London
- Set in: London
- Published: London
- Publisher: Simon & Schuster UK
- Publication date: 2010
- Publication place: United Kingdom
- Media type: Print (hardcover and paperback)
- Pages: 372
- ISBN: 9781847373519
- Dewey Decimal: 306.709421

City of Sin: London and Its Vices, released in the United States as The Sexual History of London, is a 2010 book by British author, academic and journalist Catharine Arnold. The book had a positive reception.

== Background ==
Arnold has written several specialist history books about London. She was previously an upmarket escort in London.

== Synopsis ==
The book examines the sexual history of London from AD 80 until the present, including the history of the sex industry in the capital, homosexuality, the past of pornographic publishers on Fleet Street and details the relevant tolerance of London compared with other cities at the time. The book is described as a 'fascinating and vibrant chronicle of London at its most raw and vibrant'.

== Reception ==
Critical reception for City of Sin has been positive. In The Independent, Sarah Bakewell praised the work as "lively", while in The Observer Stephanie Merritt was more mixed, criticising the book for presenting sex work in an unduly positive light but ultimately describing it as "a lively affirmation of sexual desire in all its varieties". In the New York Journal of Books, the book is praised as a "magnificent chronicle of sex throughout the ages not only helps us to understand the history that shaped the capitol’s current desires, fetishes, kinks, and peccadilloes, it also allows us to return to the city, book in hand, to excavate London’s deep sexual terrain".
