= Underworld London =

2012 book by Catharine Arnold

Underworld London: Crime and Punishment in the Capital City
- Author: Catharine Arnold
- Language: English
- Subject: History of crime in London
- Publisher: Simon & Schuster
- Publication date: 2012
- Publication place: United Kingdom
- Media type: Print
- Pages: 340
- ISBN: 978-0-85720-116-4
- Dewey Decimal: 364.9421

Underworld London: Crime and Punishment in the Capital City is a 2012 book by British author, academic and journalist, Catharine Arnold. The book is a "colourful, gruesome" history of crime and punishment in London. The book also examines the influence of the "criminal classes in on literature" and examines the Soho gangs of the 1950s and 1960s.

== Reception ==
In The Daily Telegraph Lilian Pizzichini described the book as "a chronological account of theft, murder and riot, and the concurrent methods of restraining the population in the capital" and noted that "Arnold clearly favours the highwayman: her pen-portraits sparkle with the notoriety and swagger of these romantic figures." The Historical Novel Society also praised the work, writing "the author collates a variety of secondary sources in a readable and pacy narrative" and whilst also noting "Arnold makes a strong case to show why capital punishment should remain off the statute books and if there is anything positive to take away from this catalogue of human iniquity, it is that the more enlightened recent attitudes towards the punishment of serious crime has to be a good thing".
