= A Snowball in Hell =

2008 book by Christopher Brookmyre

- First edition
- Author: Christopher Brookmyre
- Language: English
- Genre: Satire, crime, detective, black humour
- Published: 2008 (Little Brown, London)
- Publication place: United Kingdom
- Media type: Print (hardback & paperback)
- ISBN: 9780349-12051-5
- Preceded by: The Attack of the Unsinkable Rubber Ducks
- Followed by: Pandaemonium

A Snowball in Hell (2008) completes Christopher Brookmyre's suspense trilogy featuring DI Angelique de Xavia. She and her antagonist, Simon Darcourt, were introduced in A Big Boy Did It and Ran Away (2001), while she was the central character in The Sacred Art of Stealing (2002), where she met the third main character of Snowball, the magician Zal Innez. Brookmyre himself sees Snowball as a sequel to two separate books.

== Plot summary ==
The story is set five years after the two previous novels in the group. Angelique de Xavia is now working for an anti-terrorist squad based in Paris. Then she is needed in London, where Simon Darcourt—who was supposed to have died in their confrontation at the end of "A Big Boy Did It and Ran Away"—is back on the scene, with a new specialization: broadcasting videos of the torture (and, sometimes, deaths) of celebrities he has kidnapped.

Meanwhile, Zal Innez, who is in danger from Scottish gangsters, American gangsters, and the law, finds a berth on a cruise ship and becomes a performing magician, drawing crowds.

Angelique is contacted by a person who has abducted her parents, and who will trade them only for Darcourt; meanwhile, she is part of a team looking to arrest Darcourt. She tracks down Zal, believing he can out-think Darcourt, and her parents' abductors too. Zal immediately responds and they seem to be making progress, discovering that Darcourt has cancer. Zal finally sees through Darcourt's multiple misdirections, and the reader is gradually brought up to speed as the finale unfolds.

== Characters ==
Main point-of-view characters:

- Angelique de Xavia: Now a mature but still lonely woman of 35, she has devoted her life to the police and the past five years to fighting terrorism. She is morally exhausted and is considering quitting police work. In this novel, far more than in "Sacred Art," she is tormented by her position as a policewoman who has powerful reasons to rescue the criminal from prosecution.
- Simon Darcourt: His diatribes are presented in the first person. Whereas in A Big Boy Simon was not sadistic, merely massively narcissistic and inhumane, in this novel he takes on the role of confronting individuals with their individual crimes (as he sees them) and providing what he considers appropriate tortures before death. His intelligent, articulate, and complete contempt for his fellow man provides the blackest humor in the novel. His name, like that of Jack Parlabane in other novels by Brookmyre, is derived from a character in Robertson Davies's novel "The Rebel Angels."
- Zal Innez: Son of a Glaswegian magician and a Latina showgirl, born in Las Vegas, an ex-con, he is no longer being blackmailed into committing crimes but fears pursuit for betrayals of two gangsters, as well as a major theft, in The Sacred Art of Stealing. He finds an elderly mentor and finally becomes the famous magician ("Maximillian") his own father had believed he could be.

== Themes ==
The first two novels are set in Glasgow, as befits Tartan Noir, but this one is primarily set in London. Nevertheless, it is one of two Brookmyre novels chosen for discussion by Len Wanner in his 2015 book Tartan Noir: The Definitive Guide to Scottish Crime Fiction (the other being the very first, Quite Ugly One Morning). Wanner focuses on it because of "the moral quality of Brookmyre's narrative strategy" of presenting much of the story in the voice of the "Sadean" (not merely sadistic but like the Marquis himself) philosopher-terrorist Simon Darcourt.

This novel turns a satirical eye (Simon's) on celebrity culture, pop music, and television reality shows. Wanner sees the wit as "Wildean" but there is a larger concern with popular culture's dependence on an audience. The darkly humorous theme of "Dying to be Famous" (a "show" Simon broadcasts) links up with the willingness of a Parisian jihadi to die in order to obtain the publicity of police firing in a mosque surrounded by TV cameras. The only thing that matters in such a culture is being perceived. This contrasts with Angelique's resistance to being an ethnic postergirl for the police.

Angelique de Xavia, through all three novels, provides "a distinctive take on racism, sectarianism, and elective loyalties," representing the "post-colonial detective" studied by Ed Christian and Peter Clandfield. As Clandfield says, her "integration into long narratives whose full complexity probably cannot be conveyed in an essay such as this one" prevents her from being a merely noir—or merely Black—protagonist. In Snowball she finally confronts her parents' assimilationist hopes for her and finds her own way of reconciling herself with them.

Another retrospective theme for all three novels emerges in the comparison between the artisanal, entertaining magic Zal performs and Simon's self-congratulatory cleverness as a murderer. The trilogy resolves with Zal's insight trumping Simon's passionate trickiness.

== Reception ==
The novel won a 2009 Bollinger Everyman Wodehouse Prize. It did not however receive as strong a critical reception as the first two in the group.
