= Catharine Arnold =

British author, journalist and academic

- Education: Girton College, Cambridge
- Occupations: Author, journalist, academic
- Writing career
- Genre: Popular history

Catharine Arnold is a British author, journalist and academic.

She is best known for her 'London' series of five popular history books: Necropolis: London and Its Dead (2006), Bedlam: London and Its Mad (2008), City of Sin: London and Its Vices (2010), Underworld London: Crime and Punishment in the Capital City (2012), and Globe Life in Shakespeare's London (2015).

Among her later works are Pandemic 1918: The Story of the Deadliest Influenza in History.

Catharine Arnold read English at Girton College, Cambridge and holds a post-graduate degree in psychology.

In 2020, Arnold served as Writer in Residence for the UK Council for Psychotherapy and Counselling.

== Selected works ==
- Necropolis: London and Its Dead (2006)
- Bedlam: London and Its Mad (2008)
- City of Sin: London and Its Vices (2010)
- The Sexual History of London (2011)
- Underworld London: Crime and Punishment in the Capital City (2012)
- Globe Life in Shakespeare's London (2015)
- Pandemic 1918: The Story of the Deadliest Influenza in History (2018)
