= All Fun and Games Until Somebody Loses an Eye =

2005 novel by Christopher Brookmyre

- First edition
- Author: Christopher Brookmyre
- Language: English
- Genre: Black humour, Satire, Crime novel
- Publisher: Little Brown, London
- Publication date: 2005
- Publication place: United Kingdom
- Media type: Print (Hardback & (Paperback)

All Fun and Games Until Somebody Loses an Eye is the ninth novel by Scottish writer Chris Brookmyre published in 2005.

== Plot summary ==
Jane Fleming, a 46-year-old housewife and grandmother, lives a quiet life in suburban East Kilbride. All that changes when her son, Ross, who works in the arms industry, is forced into hiding when his latest research attracts unwanted attention. Aided by the mysterious Bett, Jane must confront drug dealers, assassins and ruthless arms dealers in order to save her son.

== Awards ==
All Fun And Games Until Somebody Loses an Eye was the winner of the seventh Bollinger Everyman Wodehouse Prize for Comic Fiction in 2006.

It was nominated for the 2007 Theakston's Old Peculier Crime Novel of the Year Award.
