= Dead Girl Walking =

2015 novel by Christopher Brookmyre

- First edition
- Author: Christopher Brookmyre
- Language: English
- Genre: Satire, Crime, detective, black humour
- Publisher: Little, Brown
- Publication date: 2015
- Publication place: United Kingdom
- Media type: Print (Hardback)
- Pages: 384
- ISBN: 978-1408705599 (Hardback first edition)
- Preceded by: Flesh Wounds

Dead Girl Walking is the nineteenth novel written by Christopher Brookmyre, and the sixth featuring journalist Jack Parlabane, the writer's most used character.

The novel was released in the United Kingdom on 22 January 2015.

== Plot ==
Jack Parlabane is asked to locate Heike Gunn, the lead singer of the band Savage Earth Heart. Parlabane searches for Gunn throughout Europe's capitals and remote regions of the Scottish islands.
