= Marisa Haetzman =

Scottish writer and anaesthetist

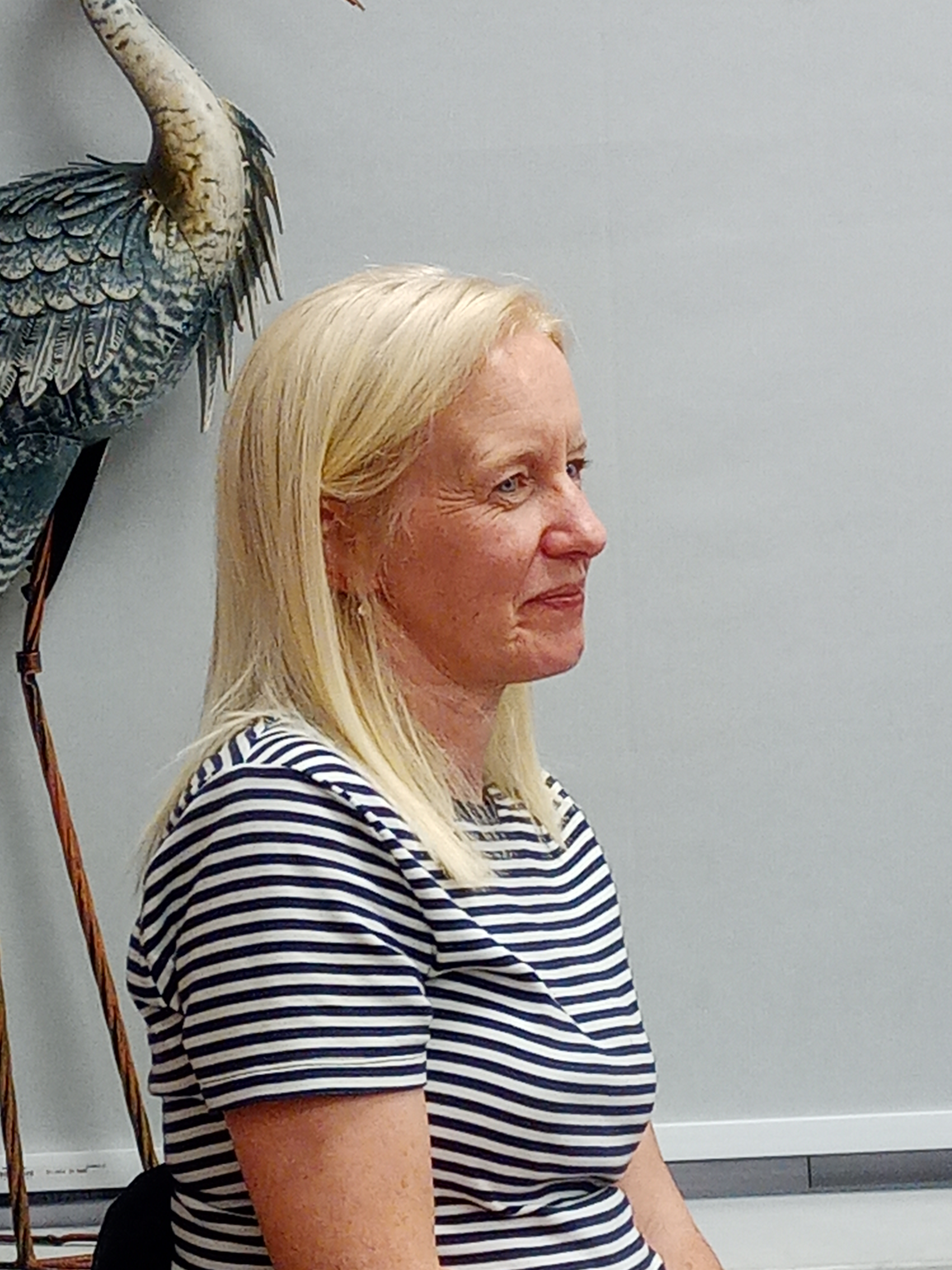
- in 2025 at "Heron and Willow bookshop"
- Born: c.1968
- Occupations: consultant anaesthetist and writer
- Spouse: Chris Brookmyre

Dr Marisa Haetzman (born 1968) is an anaesthetist and published author. Together with her husband Chris Brookmyre, she has written several historical fiction novels under the joint pen name Ambrose Parry.

== Education ==
She studied at the University of Glasgow, during which she won the Hunter Medal for Pharmacology. She graduated with a medical degree in 1990.

After leaving work at Wishaw General Hospital she studied and received a master's degree in the history of medicine.

In July 2024, she was awarded an honorary doctorate from the University of the West of Scotland.

== Career ==
She practised in Glasgow, London, Edinburgh and Aberdeen as a consultant anaesthetist.

She is a member of the Royal College of Physicians and a Fellow of the Royal College of Anaesthetists.

=== Writing ===
Together with her husband, under the joint pen-name Ambrose Parry, she has published four historical fiction novels which look at the subjects of crime in old Edinburgh and the development of medicine in the 19th century, including the role of women. The stories are set during the era following the discovery of chloroform by James Young Simpson.

Their collaborative pen name comes from Ambroise Paré, the 16th century French military surgeon.

=== Published works ===
- The Way of All Flesh, 2018
- The Art of Dying, 2020
- A Corruption of Blood, 2021
- Voices of the Dead, 2023.

== Personal life ==
She met her husband Chris Brookmyre in 1985 at Glasgow University on a walking trip organised by the University Catholic Chaplaincy Centre. They have one son (b.2000).

She has a sister who lives in Australia. In 2023, she was reported as living in Scotland.
