= The Sacred Art of Stealing =

2002 novel by Christopher Brookmyre

- First edition
- Author: Christopher Brookmyre
- Language: English
- Genre: Satire, crime, heist, detective, black humour
- Publisher: Abacus
- Publication date: 2002
- Publication place: United Kingdom
- Media type: Print (Hardback & Paperback)
- Pages: 416 p. (paperback edition)
- ISBN: 0-349-11490-0 (paperback edition)
- OCLC: 59357484
- Preceded by: A Big Boy Did It and Ran Away
- Followed by: Be My Enemy

The Sacred Art of Stealing is a satirical crime novel by the Scottish writer Christopher Brookmyre. It is the author's seventh book and is a stand-alone sequel to A Big Boy Did It and Ran Away.

The book is a tale of the unusual romance between likable thief, Zal Innez, and D.I. Angelique de Xavia, the police officer whose job it is to catch him. Martial arts expert de Xavia is recovering from her recent experiences as told in A Big Boy Did It and Ran Away.

The book uses a blend of black humour, strong language, violence and references to literary and artistic works such as Waiting for Godot by Samuel Beckett.

== Plot summary ==
The plot of The Sacred Art of Stealing tells the story of American Zal Innez, a witty and intellectual art-loving thief, who is being blackmailed by crime boss Alessandro Estabol to do one last major job for him.

As a warm up to their main heist, Zal and his team of fellow failed artists rob a Glasgow bank of approaching a million pounds. During the raid they use unorthodox methods such as firing itching powder at armed police, carrying fake guns, staging plays and drawing works of art for their hostages to keep casualties to a minimum.

During this robbery Zal meets and falls for a woman police officer, Angelique de Xavia, heroine of Brookmyre's previous novel, who is under-appreciated by her bosses.

Both police officer and thief become painfully aware of the strong attraction between them and a relationship is formed, despite the fact that they are both fully aware that they are on opposite sides. Zal knows Angelique is after him, and even counts on this knowledge to complete his final job, while Angelique is aware that Zal is playing her, even though she does not want to contemplate what that might imply about his real feelings for her.

== Characters ==
Detective Inspector Angelique de Xavia
Glaswegian police officer and loyal Rangers supporter (despite the fact she is Catholic and her brother is a Celtic fan) who feels isolated as a female Asian police officer. Angelique is justifiably annoyed with the attitudes of her senior colleagues who have publicly stated that her previous heroics were unjustified, despite secretly knowing that she really saved their skins. When she is held hostage by Zal, a strong connection is created between them and throughout the rest of the book she faces the difficulties of pursuing him while at the same time sympathising with his plight. Also appears in Brookmyre's other novels, A Big Boy did it and Ran Away and A Snowball in Hell.

Zal Innez
Machiavellian former artist and thief who, having deliberately been caught during a robbery he was committing for Alessandro Estobal, finds himself out of jail and working for Estobal's again. Estobal is blackmailing him by threatening to kill Zal's friend, and guardian in prison, Parnell. Zal is a likeable American, who is drawn to Glasgow because his father was Glaswegian. He combines wit with a vast literary and artistic knowledge and appreciation. Later returns in Brookmyre's novel, A Snowball in Hell.

Alessandro Estobal
Heir to the venerable Estobal crime family. Alsessandro is a young hothead, whose rash methods are frowned on by the rest of the organisation. Alessandro holds a grudge against Zal and his friends who rejected him when he tried to join their crowd, he then had them steal several paintings under the threat of killing Zal's father. Zal intentionally messed the job up to land in jail and as a result Alessandro killed his father. Upon Zal's release from prison Alessandro attempts to coerce him into another robbery, this time by threatening to kill Parnell, a prisoner who helped Zal toughen up both mentally and physically while behind bars.

"American" Harry Arthur
Real name Javier Arturo, big-time American gangster and assassin who works for the Estobal family. Harry is very cynical about Alessandro, and believes that he is not up to the job of being the head of the family. As a result, he questions many of Alessandro's plans, including his use of Innez, who Harry (correctly) believes cannot be trusted by them. His nickname is derived from his Mexican origins which Harry appears to be ashamed of, and his desire to put himself across as being 100% American.
