= Bedlam (2015 video game) =

2015 video game

- Developer: RedBedlam
- Publisher: Standfast Interactive
- Platforms: PlayStation 4, Xbox One, Microsoft Windows, macOS
- Release: October 13, 2015
- Genre: First-person shooter
- Mode: Single-player

Bedlam is a first-person shooter game developed by British studio RedBedlam and published by Standfast Interactive. It was released on October 13, 2015 for PlayStation 4 and October 16, 2015 for Xbox One. Based on the novel Bedlam by Christopher Brookmyre, it follows an ordinary Scottish woman named Heather Quinn who is trapped inside the body of a video game character and must fight her way through several environments inspired by 1990s and 2000s first-person shooter games.

The game received mixed to negative reviews from critics, who praised its comedic writing but criticized its lackluster gameplay and high amount of bugs.

== Plot ==
The game follows a digital simulation of Heather Quinn, a.k.a. Athena, an employee at an artificial intelligence technology company whose mind has been uploaded to a network of simulated fictional video games, primarily first-person shooters. The game takes place within and between these fictional games, among which her fellow employees' minds have been scattered. Some time after their uploading, the company shifted its focus to military application, and is now secretly using these games as training grounds to that end. The player helps Heather's former colleagues to fight against a villainous force known as the Integrity, which is destroying game worlds in order to locate and extract their consciousnesses for later use. After a final confrontation with the Integrity, revealed to be controlled by their boss, he escapes from the game network to an unknown destination, and Heather follows.

== Gameplay ==
The game plays in a similar manner to a 1990s first-person shooter, prioritizing constant movement and dodging rather than the use of a cover system. Gameplay is largely unchanged throughout different environments, game worlds that pay homage to FPS franchises like Quake, Medal of Honor, and Halo, as well as real-time strategy games and classic arcade games.

== Development ==
The game was created as a tie-in with the novel, Bedlam, featuring a similar concept of a person being transported inside a video game. It was intended as the first game in a trilogy of both novels and games.

The release of the game forced another game called Bedlam to change its name to Skyshine's Bedlam.

== Reception ==
Bedlam received mixed to negative reviews, with an aggregate score of 53/100 on Metacritic for the PlayStation 4 version.

Ben Tyrer of GamesRadar+ rated the game 3/5, calling its world and story "immensely likeable", and its protagonist "one of the most engaging I've witnessed in some time", but noting the amount of "technical and gameplay issues", including "major glitches" that caused important story elements to be skipped and disrupted gameplay. He called the game's shooting mechanics "bland", criticizing slow character control despite the "blindingly fast" movement and weak-feeling guns.

Jaz Rignall of USGamer rated the game 50/100, saying that while the game's concept was "absolutely brilliant", it failed in the execution, having "stiff, unforgiving gameplay" such as "finicky aiming and shooting", "punishing checkpoints" and "awkward difficulty spikes". He noted that it seemed like the developer "bit off more than it could chew".

Sammy Barker of Push Square rated it 4/10, saying that the biggest problem with the game is that "you'll wish it was so much better", praising its "razor-sharp commentary" and "fascinating plot" but saying that its "rotten first-person shooter" gameplay did not do it justice, and comparing the guns to "a spud gun loaded with mud".
