= Pandaemonium (novel) =

Novel by Christopher Brookmyre

- First edition
- Author: Christopher Brookmyre
- Language: English
- Genre: Satire, black humour, science fiction, horror
- Publisher: Little Brown
- Publication date: 13 August 2009
- Publication place: United Kingdom
- Media type: Print (Hardback)
- Pages: 352
- ISBN: 1-4087-0060-3 (Hardback first edition)
- OCLC: 321017362
- LC Class: PR6052.R58158 P36 2009
- Preceded by: A Snowball In Hell

Pandaemonium is a science fiction and horror novel by Scottish writer Christopher Brookmyre. It was published in the United Kingdom on 13 August 2009 by Little, Brown. The story is divided into two perspectives: one that follows a group of teenagers sent to a remote location for a retreat; the other focuses on a military base that has come into contact with monsters resembling demons.

== Background ==
Pandaemonium is Brookmyre's first departure from his typical writing of crime procedural novels. The novel incorporates typical elements found within science fiction and blends it with the supernatural aspects of horror. His pivot into a different genre is outlined in his interview with The Skinny, "I’d always toyed with the idea of doing something in the science fiction genre, but not really the shiny space suits and spaceships end of it."

== Plot ==
The senior pupils of St Peter's High School are on retreat to a secluded outdoor activity center, coming to terms with the murder of a fellow pupil through the means you would expect: counselling, contemplation, candid discussion and even prayer; not to mention booze, drugs, clandestine liaisons and as much partying as they can get away with. Not so far away, the commanders of a top-secret military experiment, long-since spiraled out of control, fear they may have literally unleashed the forces of Hell. Two very different worlds are on a collision course, and will clash in an earthly battle between science and the supernatural, philosophy and faith, civilization and savagery.

== Reviews ==
The novel was reviewed by The Guardian in 2009.
