= Bedlam (1988 video game) =

1988 video game

Bedlam was a 1988 video game for DOS.

== Reception ==
Your Sinclair gave the game a rating of 9. ASM (Aktueller Software Markt) gave it a 10. Ferdy Hamilton for Commodore User said "The cute little pinball bonus game makes the package just about worth it." Power Play rated the game at 6. Computer and Video Games said that "The weird thing іs that the very ordinariness of the thing doesn't really affect it's playability at all, which in actual fact isn't too bad." Zzap gave the game 40% overall. Sinclair User said that "Bedlam is definitely competent, undoubtedly addictive but equally it is unoriginal bordering on the plagiaristic, and graphically no great shakes." Crash rated it 75% overall.
