= Country of the Blind =

1997 novel by Christopher Brookmyre

- First edition
- Author: Christopher Brookmyre
- Language: English
- Genre: Satire, Crime, heist, detective, black humour
- Publisher: Abacus Books
- Publication date: 1997
- Publication place: United Kingdom
- Media type: Print (Hardback & (Paperback)
- Preceded by: Quite Ugly One Morning,
- Followed by: Not the End of the World

Published in 1997, Country of the Blind is Christopher Brookmyre's second novel. Following the adventures of Quite Ugly One Morning, the storyline finds Parlabane living in domestic bliss and about to get married. As part of the engagement package, he has promised his soon-to-be-wife that he will give up the more dangerous and illegal parts of his investigative journalism career.

== Plot summary ==
Set against mounting dissatisfaction with the Tory government of John Major, disquiet intensifies when conservative tabloid media mogul Roland Voss is found murdered in his country house in Scotland.

Next to Voss's body lies his murdered wife and their two bodyguards lie slain outside their room. The culprits appear to be the burglars, covered in blood, caught fleeing the scene. Four men are arrested for the crime, including former thief Thomas McInnes, his son Paul, and a man who goes by the name of "Spammy".

However questions remain. Why did McInnes pay a visit to his Edinburgh lawyer, Nicole Carrow, a few days before the crime took place, and what are the secret contents of the envelope he left with her?

When his lawyer shows up at the police station demanding to see her client, she claims to have a letter that proves her client's innocence, a statement she makes under intense media attention. The last thing she expects is to have an attempt made on her life within hours.
