= Skyshine's Bedlam =

2015 video game

- Developer: Skyshine Games
- Publisher: Versus Evil
- Platforms: Windows, OS X
- Release: Windows; September 16, 2015; OS X; November 25, 2015
- Genres: Turn-based tactical roguelike, simulation
- Mode: Single-player

Skyshine's Bedlam is a turn-based tactical roguelike and simulation game developed by Skyshine Games and published by Versus Evil. It was released in 2015 for Windows and OS X.

It received mixed reviews from critics, who praised its art and music, but criticized its story and high level of difficulty.

== Gameplay ==
The player is the overseer of a massive wheeled fortress known as the Dozer, and must cross a post-apocalyptic wasteland safely. The player can choose a route on a minimap, which determines what types of encounters they have. The player can also upgrade the Dozer in order to make traversal of the wasteland easier.

Fights take place on an isometric grid. Squad members come in four classes, each with their own specialties. Soldiers cannot be replaced when they die, and it is almost inevitable that casualties will occur.

== Plot ==
The player must navigate the Dozer from Bysantine, a futuristic metropolis, to Aztec City, a distant utopia. Many factions control parts of the wasteland in between, such as Cyborgs, Mutants, Marauders, or A.I. Each trip is procedurally generated, and events occur differently in each playthrough.

== Development ==
The setting of the game was formerly a tabletop RPG, and was based on 80's science fiction and Dungeons & Dragons. The developers were also inspired by the fast pace of games like FTL and XCOM.

The game uses the engine of The Banner Saga. It was originally known as simply Bedlam, but changed its name to avoid conflict with the game Bedlam released shortly beforehand, despite having already filed a trademark for the name. It was developed after a successful Kickstarter campaign which raised $166,540.

== Reception ==
The game received mixed reviews, with an aggregate score of 67/100 on Metacritic.

Ian Birnbaum of PC Gamer rated the game 72/100, calling it "punishing" and "stressful", and saying that the difficulty was too high for him to enjoy. He stated that the inability to recruit new squad members if your existing ones died was where the game "crossed the line from enjoyably brutal to stressful frustration". However, he praised the soundtrack, saying that it was his "favorite [...] in any game since Bastion", and called the art "wonderful".

Mat Paget of GameSpot rated the game 60/100, saying that while he believed it would be the "perfect game" for him at first glance, it did not have "much strategic depth" or a reason to "care about [the characters]". He called the story "devoid of interesting or layered tales".

Artur Cnotalski of Eurogamer Poland rated the game 40/100, saying that it was "monotonous", with the storyline "devoid of any depth".
