= A Tale Etched in Blood and Hard Black Pencil =

2006 novel by Christopher Brookmyre

- First edition
- Author: Christopher Brookmyre
- Language: English
- Genre: Satire, Crime, black humour
- Publisher: Little Brown, London
- Publication date: 2006
- Publication place: United Kingdom
- Media type: Print (Hardback & (Paperback)

A Tale Etched in Blood and Hard Black Pencil is the tenth novel by Christopher Brookmyre.

== Awards ==
It has been long-listed for the 2008 Theakston's Old Peculier Crime Novel of the Year Award.
