= Bedlam (1982 video game) =

- Manual cover art
- Developer: Robert Arnstein
- Publisher: Tandy Corporation
- Platforms: TRS-80, TRS-80 Color Computer
- Release: 1982
- Genre: Interactive fiction

Bedlam is a TRS-80 based text adventure game written for the TRS-80 by Robert Arnstein and released by Tandy Corporation in 1982. It was ported to the TRS-80 Color Computer. The object of the game is to escape a lunatic asylum. There are several ways to escape but only one random exit is active each time the game is loaded.

== Gameplay ==
Opening screen

The game is text only. Players move through the asylum by typing simple instructions using a verb-noun command such as, "go north" or "get the key". There are NPCs such as Houdini and Picasso that can be either helpful or an obstacle.
