= Bedlam: London and Its Mad =

2008 book by Catharine Arnold

- Cover of the first edition
- Author: Catharine Arnold
- Language: English
- Subjects: History of mental illness and treatment of mental illness, Bethlem Hospital
- Set in: London
- Published: London
- Publisher: Pocket Books (Simon and Schuster)
- Publication date: 2008
- Publication place: United Kingdom
- Media type: Print (Hardcover and Paperback)
- Pages: 306
- ISBN: 9781847390004
- Dewey Decimal: 362.210942109

Bedlam: London and Its Mad is a 2008 book by the British journalist Catharine Arnold.

== Synopsis ==
The book follows developments in societal treatment of mental illness and the mentally ill, from the cruel days of Bethlem Hospital (often known as "Bedlam") to the campaigning psychiatrists who secured advances in treatment and changes in societal viewpoints.

== Reception ==
In The Guardian, Patrick McGrath made some criticisms of the book, arguing "Arnold occasionally makes wild claims", but notes that the strength of the book is "the author indulges all that is quirky and macabre in the fascinating story of madness in England". The Psychiatric Times was rather more critical, with the reviewer writing "Is Bedlam accurate, historically reliable, and of academic and therapeutic value? I think not", and "In the final page of the book, we discover that 'over the years, [the author has] learned to embrace melancholy', and 'some of us prefer to endure melancholy in its various manifestations and accept that this variety of madness is part of our identity. A 'Government Health Warning' should accompany this frank, therapeutic nihilism and negativity toward psychiatric treatment".
