= Chris Brookmyre =

Scottish novelist (born 1968)

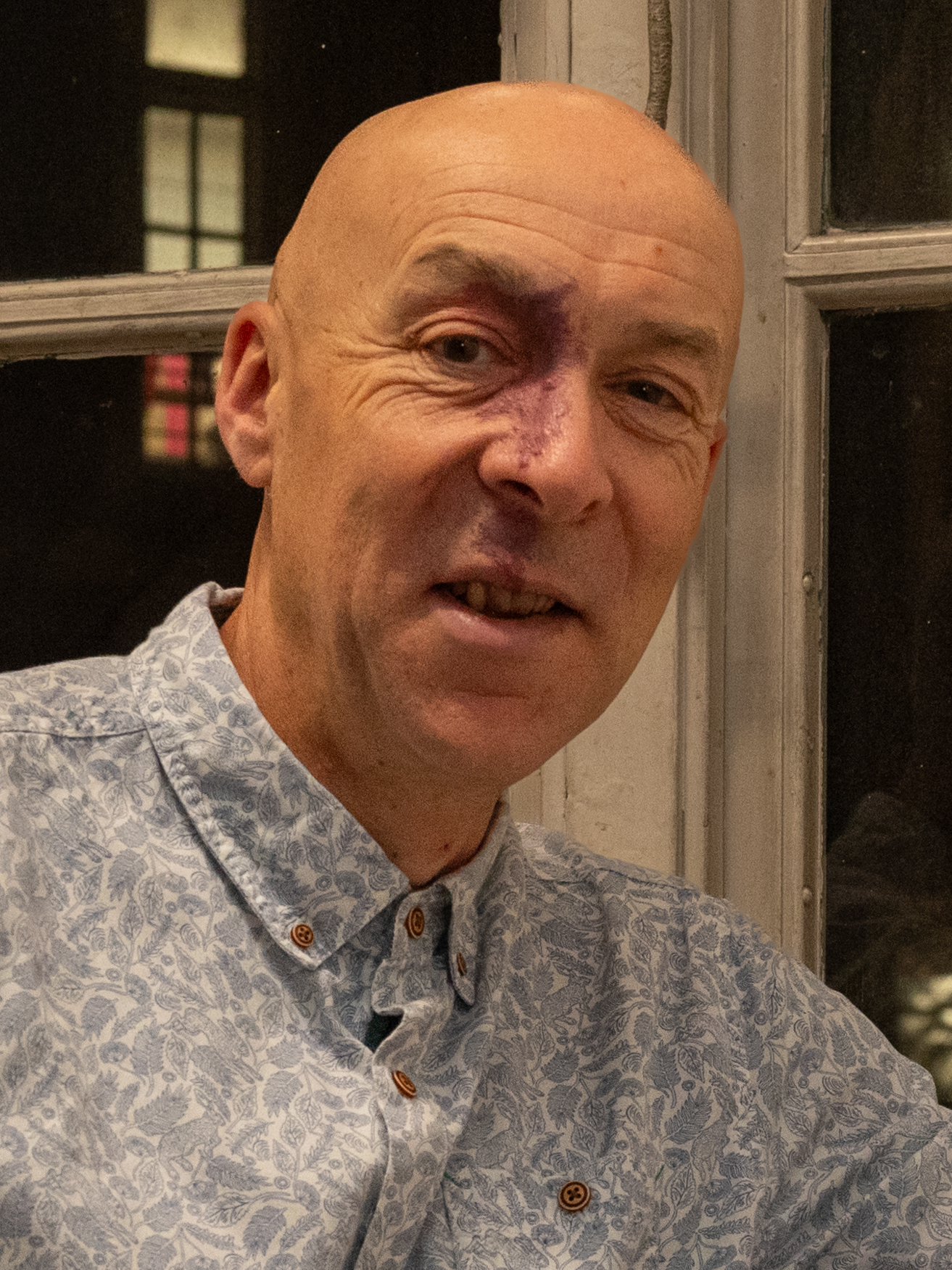
- Brookmyre in 2024
- Born: 6 September 1968 (age 58); Glasgow, Scotland
- Occupation: Novelist
- Spouse: Marisa Haetzman

Christopher Brookmyre (born 6 September 1968) is a Scottish novelist whose novels, generally in a crime or police procedural frame, mix comedy, politics, social comment and action with a strong narrative. He has been referred to as a Tartan Noir author. His debut novel was Quite Ugly One Morning; subsequent works have included All Fun and Games Until Somebody Loses an Eye (2005), Black Widow (2016) and Bedlam (2013), which was written in parallel with the development of a first-person shooter videogame, also called Bedlam. He also writes historical fiction with his wife, Dr Marisa Haetzman, under the pseudonym Ambrose Parry.

== Biography ==
Brookmyre was born in Glasgow and raised and schooled in Barrhead, attending St. Mark's Primary School and St Luke's High School, before attending the University of Glasgow.

Brookmyre is married to Dr. Marisa Haetzman, an anaesthetist, with whom he has a son, and supports St Mirren F.C., references to Scottish football ('fitba') frequently featuring in his books. Brookmyre is a member of the Fun Lovin' Crime Writers, a cover band also comprising crime novelists Mark Billingham, Doug Johnstone, Val McDermid, Stuart Neville and Luca Veste. Between April 2008 and December 2015, he was the President of Humanist Society Scotland.

In August 2025, Chris Brookmyre and his wife, Dr. Marisa Haetzman, were guests on the Off the Shelf podcast as part of a feature on the McIlvanney Prize for which Ambrose Parry was longlisted.

== Novels ==
=== Jack Parlabane ===
Nine of Brookmyre's novels (Quite Ugly One Morning, Country of the Blind, Boiling a Frog, Be My Enemy, Attack of the Unsinkable Rubber Ducks, Dead Girl Walking, Black Widow, Want You Gone and Quite Ugly One Evening) centre on the investigative journalist Jack Parlabane. Parlabane also stars in the short stories Bampot Central, Place B. and The Last Day of Christmas with the latter serving as a short prelude to Dead Girl Walking. Parlabane also appears in Fallen Angel.

=== Angelique de Xavia ===
Three of Brookmyre's novels feature the character of counterterrorism officer Angelique de Xavia: A Big Boy Did It and Ran Away, The Sacred Art of Stealing, and A Snowball in Hell. A Big Boy Did It and Ran Away and A Snowball in Hell pit Xavia against international terrorist-for-hire Simon Darcourt. A Snowball in Hell was originally due to be titled The Great Grease-Tailed Shaven Pig Hunt.

=== Jasmine Sharp and Catherine McLeod ===
Three of Brookmyre's novels feature the characters Jasmine Sharp, a private detective, and Catherine McLeod, a senior police detective: Where the Bodies Are Buried, When the Devil Drives, and Flesh Wounds. McLeod also features in the short story Siege Mentality, and The Last Siege of Bothwell Castle, and has minor roles in Dead Girl Walking and Black Widow, and a minor reference in Fallen Angel.

=== Bedlam ===
Bedlam was released in 2013. The book has been turned into a video game, also written by Brookmyre.

=== As Ambrose Parry ===
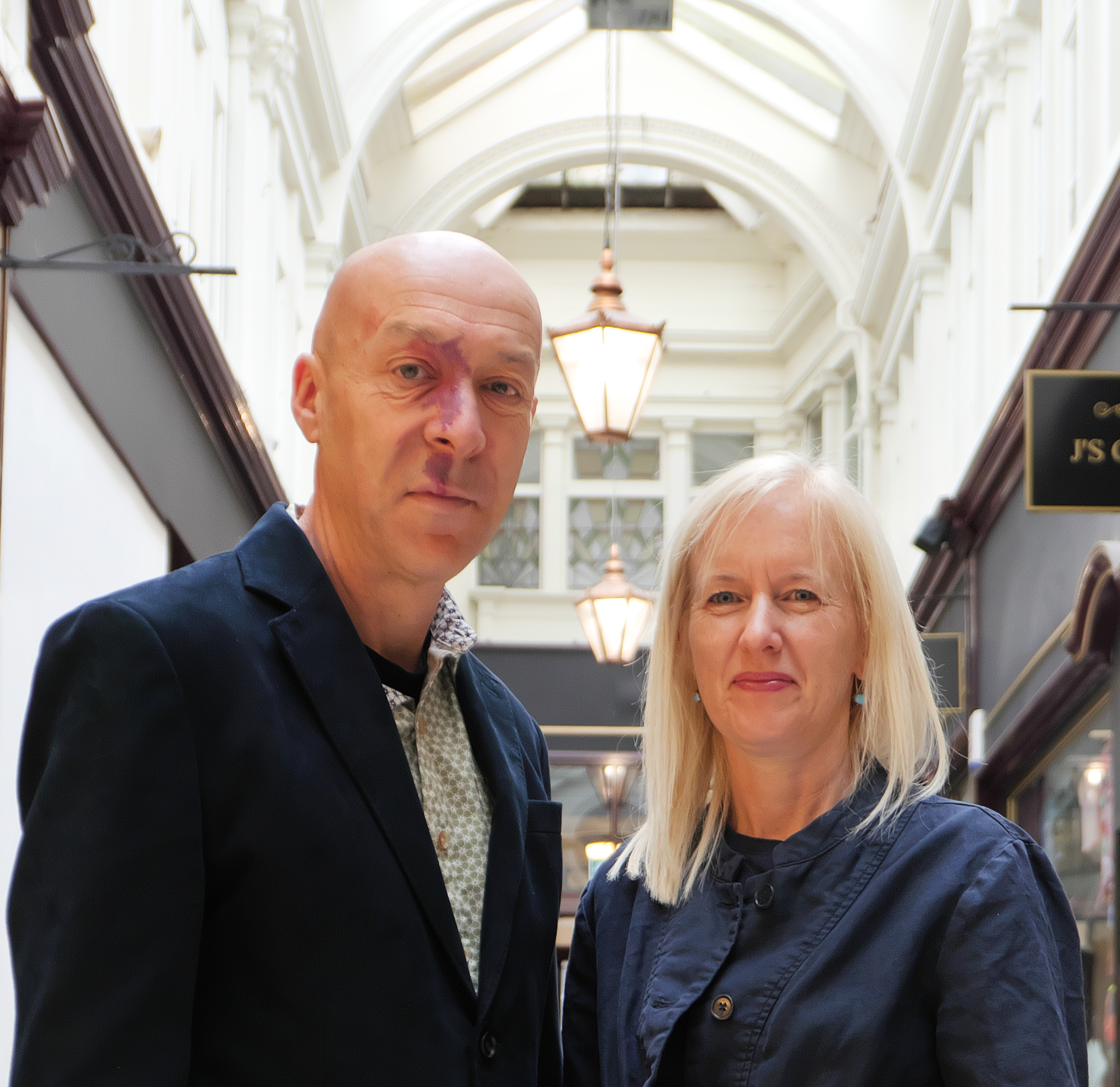
Ambrose Parry 2025

In 2018, Brookmyre wrote The Way of All Flesh with his wife, Dr. Marisa Haetzman. It was published under the pseudonym Ambrose Parry. The team followed up with The Art of Dying in 2019, A Corruption of Blood in 2021, Voices of the Dead in 2023, and The Death of Shame in 2025.

== Recurring characters ==
With the possible exceptions of Pandaemonium, Bedlam and The Cracked Mirror, Brookmyre's books are all set in the same "universe" and contain a number of recurring characters, especially the appearance or mention of major characters (such as Parlabane) in incidental roles in other stories. Some of the recurring characters are listed below:

- Jack Parlabane, an investigative journalist with an attitude towards the laws covering trespass and burglary best described as flexible. Parlabane was the protagonist of Brookmyre's debut Quite Ugly One Morning and is, to date, the most frequently appearing character. He also appears in Country of the Blind, Boiling a Frog, Be My Enemy, The Attack of the Unsinkable Rubber Ducks, Dead Girl Walking, Black Widow, and Want You Gone as a major character, and is referenced in Not the End of the World and Fallen Angel.
- Sarah Slaughter, anaesthetist and ex-wife of the murder victim in Quite Ugly One Morning. She and Jack are later married after Country of the Blind, and have separated by the time of Dead Girl Walking.
- Jenny Dalziel is an Edinburgh CID officer, part of Hector McGregor's team as a DC in Quite Ugly One Morning, who becomes a close friend of Parlabane and appears or is referenced in most of his books. She is openly gay and in a relationship with a woman called Maggie who has survived breast cancer by the time of Dead Girl Walking.
- CID Officers Catherine McLeod, Anthony "Beano" Thompson and Laura Geddes appear in the three "Jasmine Sharp" novels and also play minor roles in Dead Girl Walking. This provides the first strong link between the "Sharp" and "Parlabane" story arcs. (However, note that whereas Beano is a DC - Detective Constable - in the "Jasmine Sharp" novels, he is described in Dead Girl Walking as a DI - Detective Inspector - in three locations, and never as a DC. Catherine McLeod is a Detective Superintendent in both environments.) Catherine McLeod is also mentioned in a closing chapter of Fallen Angel, as investigating the death of a character.
- Jenny Dalziel and Catherine McLeod are mentioned in the same breath in Want You Gone.
- Nicole Carrow is a junior solicitor in an Edinburgh law firm in Country of the Blind, and is Thomas 'Tam' McInnes' lawyer. In the same book she becomes mixed up in governmental actions against McInnes and his associates, and is rescued by Jack Parlabane, Sarah Slaughter and Jenny Dalziel. She is also mentioned in Boiling a Frog as being Jack Parlabane's lawyer, but does not actually appear. She is also mentioned in Attack of the Unsinkable Rubber Ducks as Sarah Slaughter's lawyer.
- Angelique de Xavia, the diminutive but deadly police officer from A Big Boy Did It and Ran Away, The Sacred Art of Stealing and A Snowball in Hell.
- Tim 'Death's Dark' Vale, the head of security on the Floating Island Paradise Resort in One Fine Day in the Middle of the Night, is revealed as an associate of Jack Parlabane in Country of the Blind when Sarah accuses Jack of having got his gun from Vale. They then join forces in Be My Enemy. One of the training areas in Bedlam is also named Death's Dark Vale.
- Simon Darcourt, the Black Spirit, is the "hero" of the short story Mellow Doubt and A Big Boy Did It and Ran Away. He also features in A Snowball in Hell (which also re-uses Mellow Doubt as part of the story).
- Steff Kennedy, the hero of Not the End of the World, is mentioned as the photographer who took the picture of the Arguments for their single sleeve in A Big Boy Did It and Ran Away. He also features in Dead Girl Walking shooting a major photospread of the female members of the band "Savage Earth Heart" for "Tatler".
- Larry Freeman, who has a cameo in Quite Ugly One Morning as a friend of Parlabane's, also features in Not the End of the World. In the short-story Bampot Central, Jack Parlabane is attempting to post "Paranoid Tim" to Larry's young son as a birthday present when he becomes embroiled in an armed robbery, "Paranoid Tim" is himself referenced in Not the End of the World. He further has a brief cameo in Attack of the Unsinkable Rubber Ducks in a phone call with Parlabane.
- Former police Inspector Hector McGregor, who investigated the murder of Dr Jeremy Ponsonby in Quite Ugly One Morning, returns to play a part in One Fine Day in the Middle of the Night.
- Zal Innez was one of the main characters in The Sacred Art of Stealing and was brought back with a similarly central role in A Snowball in Hell.
- Glasgow Gangster Bud Hannigan has a small role in A Big Boy Did It and Ran Away and is later one of the main villains in The Sacred Art of Stealing. He surfaces again in All Fun and Games, Until Someone Loses an Eye and is also referenced in A Tale Etched in Blood and Hard Black Pencil. Hannigan is noted to have died at a point in time between events in All Fun And Games, Until Someone Loses An Eye and those in A Snowball in Hell, in which his death is mentioned.
- Marius Roth, a shadowy figure with a near mythical reputation, is mentioned in All Fun and Games Until Someone Loses an Eye as the paymaster and A Snowball in Hell as a possible employer of the Black Spirit. It is implied, though never confirmed, that he is "Shub", who appears in A Big Boy Did It and Ran Away as the owner of "the good ship Black and Decker". He is certainly the owner of the yacht which is raided by Bett's Tiger Team in All Fun And Games Until Someone Loses An Eye; a connection confirmed in A Snowball in Hell.
- Raymond Ash, "Larry - the little drummer boy", a major character in A Big Boy Did It and Ran Away is referenced in both The Sacred Art of Stealing and Mellow Doubt and appears briefly in A Snowball in Hell.
- Spammy, one of the suspects in Country of the Blind, reappears towards the end of Attack of the Unsinkable Rubber Ducks and is referenced in Boiling a Frog and appears again in Dead Girl Walking. Most recently he appears in, and had dialog in, Want You Gone, in which he builds some electronic surveillance devices for Jack Parlabane and also comments on the provenance of blueprints and design documents of other devices.
- Comedian Matt Black who attended the class reunion on the Floating Island Paradise Resort in One Fine Day in the Middle of the Night, is referenced in Flesh Wounds. He is portrayed as having a similar career path to Billy Connolly, with a background in stand-up before appearing in an American sitcom which is poorly received.
- 'Sammy' Finnegan appears in When the Devil Drives (Jasmine Sharp 2) and Black Widow (Jack Parlabane 7). This is therefore another link between these two story arcs. Finnegan also appears in The Cliff House.
- 'Rank Bajin', a strip cartoon character created by Bud Neill, a Glasgow cartoon artist of an earlier generation, is mentioned briefly in One Fine Day in the Middle of the Night. In "A Big Boy did it and Ran Away" the identification of the Spirit's calling-card symbol as being in fact the image of Rank Bajin is major plot development point.
- Alexis 'Lex', a major character in "All Fun and Games until someone loses an Eye" appears briefly and has a conversation with Jack Parlabane, in "Want You Gone". She appears as a security consultant at a trade fair, working for Solid Bett Security Partners, so is presumably still connected with her fellow characters from "All Fun and Games...."
- Savage Earth Heart, the band in "Dead Girl Walking", is referenced on the last-page-but-one of "Fallen Angel". In "The Cut" a character is described as wearing a Savage Earth Heart t-shirt.

== Influences ==
Brookmyre has said that the inspiration for Jack Parlabane was Ford Prefect from Douglas Adams' The Hitchhiker's Guide to the Galaxy series; he said "I always adored the idea of a character who cheerfully wanders into enormously dangerous situations and effortlessly makes them much worse." The name Parlabane is taken from the works of the Canadian author Robertson Davies, as are the names of several other characters in Brookmyre's works, indicating another of the author's influences.

Music is heavily featured in several books. Quite Ugly One Morning is taken from Warren Zevon's album Mr. Bad Example - the last chapter title continues the song's chorus. Zevon and Bruce Springsteen feature in the second novel, Country of the Blind. The band 'Savage Earth Heart' in Dead Girl Walking share their name with a song by The Waterboys.

Art Alexakis of the band Everclear has been thanked by Brookmyre inside the front cover of two of his books – Be My Enemy and The Sacred Art of Stealing. Brookmyre has said that Sacred Art was inspired by the Everclear song 'Unemployed Boyfriend' from the album Songs from an American Movie Vol. One: Learning How to Smile. This is the song which the lead character, Zal Innez, discusses with Angelique De Xavia. De Xavia is stated by her brother to spend her evenings alone "drinking supermarket merlot and listening to that depressing Mogwai rubbish" in The Sacred Art of Stealing. The first name for Innez, as well as the inspiration for the costumes worn by his gang of bank robbers, are taken from Zal Cleminson, guitarist for The Sensational Alex Harvey Band, who always wore Pierrot makeup on stage. Parlabane is a fan of Skids and Big Country and Jasmine Sharp goes to see Twin Atlantic perform live in one of her books.

The character Jane Fleming in All Fun and Games Until Somebody Loses an Eye visits King Tut's Wah Wah Hut in Glasgow, witnessing a performance by Afghan Whigs frontman Greg Dulli's side-project The Twilight Singers which references lines from the Twilight Singers' song "Teenage Wristband". Dulli is also the rock-star on whose NME-emblazoned face Matt Black signs an autograph in One Fine Day in the Middle of the Night.

== In other media ==
In 2003, Quite Ugly One Morning was dramatised in two parts by ITV, with the lead played by Irish actor James Nesbitt. None of Brookmyre's other novels have been adapted for television, but his short story Bampot Central was rewritten as a radio play by the author for BBC Radio 3.

In 2004, actor David Tennant narrated the audiobook of Quite Ugly One Morning.

In 2007, actor Billy Boyd narrated the audiobook of Attack of the Unsinkable Rubber Ducks.

== Awards ==
- Quite Ugly One Morning was the winner of the Critics' First Blood Award for Best First Crime Novel of the Year in 1996.
- Bampot Central was shortlisted for the CWA Macallan Short Story Dagger in 1997.
- Boiling a Frog won the Sherlock Award for Best Comic Detective in 2000.
- All Fun and Games Until Somebody Loses an Eye was the winner of the seventh Bollinger Everyman Wodehouse Prize for Comic Fiction in 2006.
- Black Widow won the McIlvanney Prize, previously known as the Scottish Crime Book of the year, in 2016.
- Black Widow was the winner of the Theakstons Old Peculier Crime Novel of the Year in 2017.
- Winner of the Crime Writers' Association Dagger in the Library in 2020.
- The Cracked Mirror won the McIlvanney Prize for best Scottish crime book of the year 2024.

== Bibliography ==
=== Jack Parlabane series ===
- Quite Ugly One Morning, 1996
- Country of the Blind, 1997
- Boiling a Frog, 2000
- Be My Enemy, 2004
- The Attack of the Unsinkable Rubber Ducks, 2007
- Dead Girl Walking, 2015
- Black Widow, 2016
- Want You Gone, 2017 (published in the U.S. as The Last Hack)
- Quite Ugly One Evening, 2026

=== Angelique de Xavia series ===
- A Big Boy Did It and Ran Away, 2001
- The Sacred Art of Stealing, 2003
- A Snowball in Hell, 2008

=== Jasmine Sharp and Catherine McLeod series ===
- Where the Bodies Are Buried, 2011
- When the Devil Drives, 2012
- Flesh Wounds, 2013 (published in the U.S. as Bred In the Bone)

=== Works published as Ambrose Parry (Co-authored with Dr. Marisa Haetzman) ===
- The Way of All Flesh, 2018
- The Art of Dying, 2020
- A Corruption of Blood, 2021
- The Spendthrift and the Swallow (short story), 2023
- Voices of the Dead, 2023
- The Apple Falls Not Far (short story), 2025
- The Death of Shame, 2025

=== Other works ===
- Not the End of the World, 1998
- One Fine Day in the Middle of the Night, 1999
- All Fun and Games Until Somebody Loses an Eye, 2005
- A Tale Etched in Blood and Hard Black Pencil, 2006
- Pandaemonium, 2009
- Jaggy Splinters (ebook only), 2012
- Bedlam, 2013
- The Last Day of Christmas, 2014 (ebook only - short story)
- Siege Mentality, 2017 (ebook only - short story. Originally published as The Last Siege of Bothwell Castle in the Bloody Scotland anthology)
- Places in the Darkness (starting with this novel, the author's byline is given as Chris Brookmyre), 2017
- Fallen Angel, 2019
- The Cut, 2021
- The Cliff House, 2022
- The Cracked Mirror, 2024
