= Bedlam (Brookmyre novel) =

2013 novel by Christopher Brookmyre

- First edition
- Author: Christopher Brookmyre
- Language: English
- Genre: Satire, black humour, science fiction
- Publisher: Orbit
- Publication date: 7 February 2013
- Publication place: United Kingdom
- Media type: Print (Hardback)
- Pages: 384
- ISBN: 0356502139 (Hardback first edition)
- Preceded by: Jaggy Splinters

Bedlam is Christopher Brookmyre's seventeenth novel. It was published in the United Kingdom on 7 February 2013. The book has been turned into a video game, also written by Brookmyre.

== Characters in Bedlam ==
- Ross Baker - protagonist, a scientist employed by Neurosphere
- Carol - Ross' girlfriend
- Solderburn - Ross' friend and an inventor
- Juno
- Lieutenant Kamnor
- Sargeant Gortoss
- Isaac Michaels/Ankou - the antagonist
- The Sandman (Alex)
- Iris
