= Quite Ugly One Morning =

1996 novel by Christopher Brookmyre

- First edition
- Author: Christopher Brookmyre
- Language: English
- Genre: Satire, Crime, heist, detective, black humour
- Publisher: Little, Brown
- Publication date: 1996
- Publication place: United Kingdom
- Media type: Print (Hardback and Paperback)
- ISBN: 0-316-87883-9 (Hardback first edition)
- OCLC: 35844309
- Dewey Decimal: 823/.914 21
- LC Class: PR6052.R58158 Q58 1996
- Followed by: Country of the Blind

Quite Ugly One Morning is Christopher Brookmyre's first novel, and it introduces Jack Parlabane, the writer's most used character. It was published to popular and critical acclaim, winning the inaugural Critics' First Blood Award for the best first crime novel of the year. Comedian Ed Byrne is known for being a fan of this story, as well as a friend of the author: he also chose it for his appearance on Radio 4's A Good Read.

== Plot ==
=== Summary ===
Jack Parlabane rents a flat from a friend in Edinburgh (which just happens to be opposite a police station), and investigating the unpleasant murder of a gambling medic in the flat below proves too much to resist, the victim mutilated and the crime scene grossly vandalized; the victim, Dr Jeremy Ponsonby, is tied up, missing both his nose and his index fingers, had his throat cut, and the crime scene is covered in urine and faeces and vomit, the latter being from the postman who found the body. Parlabane soon finds himself involved with a number of characters including Darren Mortlake, a hit-man from Essex, Dr Sarah Slaughter, the dead doctor's ex-wife, lesbian with attitude DC Jenny Dalziel, and crooked hospital trust administrator Stephen Lime.

The book takes its name from a song from Warren Zevon's 1991 album Mr. Bad Example. It was followed by the best seller Country of the Blind in 1997 which again involved Jack Parlabane.

=== Synopsis ===
Journalist Jack Parlabane gets accidentally locked out and, entering a neighbour's flat, stumbles into a bizarre crime scene, the victim a horribly mutilated Dr Jeremy Ponsonby. With Parlabane found suspicious and taken in for questioning, Ponsonby's ex-wife, Dr Sarah Slaughter, later enters the unattended crime scene in an attempt to accept his death. Finding a plastic ampoule dropped at the scene, Sarah collects it as Parlabane appears, released from custody, and he invites her into his flat to talk. Explaining he's a crime journalist who very recently fled Los Angeles, Jack tells Sarah that he believes her ex-husband's murder was for personal or political reasons, and not a "break-in gone wrong" as the police believe.

Previously, hitman Darren Mortlake snuck into Posonby's flat on behalf of Midlothian NHS trust administrator Stephen Lime, intending to inject Ponsonby with potassium chloride and make his death look like a heart attack. Accidentally waking Ponsonby, a struggle ensues where Ponsonby bites off Darren's index finger and several pieces of furniture are smashed. Having knocked his target out, Darren ties him and cuts his throat, angrily mutilating his body as he dies. Before he leaves, Darren thoroughly contaminates the crime scene in an attempt to overwhelm and confuse the police. Hiding in a Bed and Breakfast hotel owned by one Mrs Kinross, Darren inadvertently attracts her attention when he impulsively kills her dog, despite tactfully disposing of the body.

Meeting with DC Jenny Dalziel, Jack explains about the ampoule, and Jenny agrees to work with him quid pro quo provided he doesn't incriminate himself. Finding Sarah during her on-call shift, Jack finds parts of the hospital, especially the on-call room, to be in severe disrepair. Jack soon learns that as Sarah's marriage deteriorated, Posonby amassed large gambling debts; Ponsonby's father cleared his debt provided he repay him directly from his wages, meaning any of the NHS Trust's senior staff could know of Ponsonby's financial issues and manipulate him. Working with Dalziel to examine the crime scene, the group soon finds £2000 hidden in Ponsonby's flat, meaning Posonby was a criminal who was silenced.

Jack has his old US editor, Mike Gorman, arrange a visit to the county hospital. Excited about the publicity, Lime's staff welcomes Jack to the hospital, allowing him to case the security and strike a deal with the hospital's disgruntled IT administrator, Matt Dempsy. Returning at night, Jack accesses the system with a login provided by Dempsey, allowing him to decrypt Lime's personal files; Jack not only figures out Lime is behind Ponsonby's murder, but that he plans to demolish the elderly care centre and sell the land for hotel development, clearing the Trust's debt and making him a fortune in bribes. Mrs Kinross, aware Darren has murdered her dog and discovering he's a fugitive, drugs his food and ties him to his bed, breaking his nose in anger and leaving to calling the police. Forced to act quickly, Darren pulls the knife from his pillow with his mouth, severely slicing his cheeks but cutting his bonds. Still heavily drugged, Darren escapes but collapses near a train track, waking to find his hand being severed by a passing train.

Phoning Anna, one of his contacts, Jack has her trace the deal back to Lime and the Midlothian Trust through several proxy companies and businessmen, proving Lime's involvement beyond doubt. Sarah, following a hunch, looks at the patient archives and finds a horrifying pattern: numerous dementia patients, so ill they required permanent hospice care, were all found dead of a presumed cardiac arrest the day after Jeremy Ponsonby was the on-call registrar; Ponsonby had murdered over thirty long-term patients for Lime, freeing up bed space in the elderly care centre and making it easier to justify a closure and demolition, making her late husband a prolific serial killer.

Lime, pressed into acting by his business associates, checks his files and plans and realizes they're not encrypted, causing him to panic. Also seeing that Dr Slaughter has accessed the patient archives most recently, Lime flees the office. Having failed to apprehend Darren and informed by Jack, Dalziel and the inspectors race to Lime's home, only to find him missing and an empty case of shotgun shells. Answering the door at his flat, Jack and Sarah are cornered by Lime, who holds them at gunpoint while a grievously mutilated Darren appears. Promising to get him medical attention and pay him further, Lime tells Darren to kill Jack and Sarah so he can keep his hands clean; Jack points out that Lime will just shoot Darren once he does and make it look like a murder suicide, citing Ponsonby as another example of him killing any loose ends. Darren jumps onto Lime, causing Lime to shoot off Darren's remaining hand before Jack disarms him.

Forcing the shotgun in Lime's mouth, Jack threatens to kill Lime for revenge against all the slimey businessmen who have tried to frame and kill him for catching them; Lime soils himself and begins crying, prompting Jack to remove the gun from his mouth, taunting that Lime deserves the life imprisonment and resulting sexual assault he'll suffer as police sirens approach. With Lime and Darren arrested and the case closed, Jack and Sarah agree to spend some time together, and kiss.

== Television adaptation ==
In 2003 the novel was adapted into a television film by Clerkenwell Films for the ITV network. It was dramatised by Stuart Hepburn and directed by Sam Miller. Irish actor James Nesbitt played Parlabane, and spoke with his own accent instead of Parlabane's Glaswegian one. The producers had originally wanted Scottish actor Douglas Henshall to play Parlabane, but they were overruled by ITV's commissioners (Henshall had previously played Parlabane in a radio adaptation of the short story "Bampot Central"). Eddie Marsan, Annette Crosbie, Daniela Nardini and Mark Benton also starred. The drama was broadcast by ITV on 5 September 2004.

There were substantial changes to the plot, with Lime being a more sympathetic character and much of his backstory and political leanings removed. Morven Christie played Jenny Dunlop (Jenny Dalziel in the book) and is Parlabane's love interest rather than Sarah Slaughter.

The City of Edinburgh was used for parts of filming in the TV adaptation of the book.
