= Einar =

- Gender: Male
- Name day: 26 September: Norway and Sweden; 17 November: Estonia

Origin
- Origin: Old Norse
- Meaning: one, alone + warrior
- Region of origin: Scandinavia

Other names
- Related names: Ejnar, Ejner, Ener, Enar, Einari, Einars, Einārs

Einar is a Scandinavian given name deriving from the Old Norse name Einarr, which according to Guðbrandur Vigfússon is directly connected with the concept of the einherjar, warriors who died in battle and ascended to Valhalla in Norse mythology. Vigfússon comments that 'the name Einarr is properly = einheri" and points to a relation to the term with the Old Norse common nouns einarðr (meaning "bold") and einörð (meaning "valour").

== As given name ==
- Einár (rapper) (2002–2021), Swedish rapper
- Einar Jan Aas (born 1955), Norwegian footballer
- Einar Arnórsson (1880–1955), Icelandic politician
- Einar Axelsson (1895–1971), Swedish actor
- Einar Benediktsson (1864–1940), Icelandic poet and lawyer
- Einar Blidberg (1906–1993), Swedish Navy vice admiral
- Einar Bollason (born 1943), Icelandic former basketball player, coach and TV analyst
- Einar Bragi (1921–2005), Icelandic poet
- Einar Bruno Larsen (1939–2021), Norwegian footballer and ice hockey player
- Einar Dahl (politician) (1880–1956), Norwegian politician
- Einar Daníelsson (born 1970), Icelandic footballer
- Einar Dønnum (1897–1947) Norwegian Nazi collaborator
- Einar Englund (1916–1999), Finnish composer
- Einar Eriksson (1921–2009), Swedish weightlifter
- Einar E. Erlandsen (1908–1995), American politician
- Einar Fagstad (1899–1961), Norwegian-Swedish accordionist, singer, actor and composer
- Einar Førde (1943–2004), Norwegian politician, Minister of Education and Church Affairs and vice-chairman of the Norwegian Labour Party
- Einar Forseth (1892–1988), Swedish artist
- Einar Galilea (born 1994), Spanish footballer
- Einar Gerhardsen (1897–1987), Norwegian politician, Prime Minister of Norway
- Einar Granath (1936–1993), Swedish ice hockey player
- Einar Már Guðmundsson (born 1954), Icelandic author
- Einar Hákonarson (born 1945), Icelandic artist
- Einar Hanson (1899–1927), Swedish actor
- Einar Haugen (1906–1994), American linguist, author and Professor at University of Wisconsin–Madison and Harvard University
- Einar Hedegart (born 2001), Norwegian biathlete
- Einar Hennings (1884–1965), Swedish diplomat
- Einar Hille (1894–1980), American scholar
- Einar Hjörleifsson Kvaran (1859–1938), Icelandic editor, novelist, poet, playwright and prominent spiritualist
- Einar Høgetveit (1949–2020), Norwegian prosecutor
- Einar Høigård (1907–1943), Norwegian educator and activist
- Einar H. Ingman Jr. (1929–2015), American soldier
- Einar Iversen (1930–2019), Norwegian jazz pianist
- Einar Jansen (1893–1960), Norwegian historian, genealogist and archivist
- Einar Jolin (1890–1976), Swedish painter
- Einar Jónsson (1874–1954), Icelandic sculptor
- Einar Jørgensen (1875–1944), Norwegian military officer, teacher and politician
- Einar Kárason (born 1955), Icelandic writer
- Einar Riegelhuth Koren (born 1984), Norwegian handball player
- Einar Kristjánsson (1934–1996), Icelandic alpine skier
- Einar Lutro (born 1943), Norwegian politician
- Einar Axel Malmstrom (1907–1954), American military officer
- Einar Møbius (1891–1981), Danish gymnast
- Einar Nerman (1888–1983), Swedish artist
- Einar Økland (born 1940), Norwegian writer
- Einar Ólafsson (disambiguation)
- Einar Olsen (disambiguation)
- Einar Örn Benediktsson (born 1962), Icelandic vocalist for Sugarcubes and Ghostigital and former Reykjavik City Council member
- Einar Ortiz (born 1993), Italian singer
- Einar Nilsen (1901–1980), Norwegian boxer
- Einar Pettersen, Norwegian wrestler
- Einar Johan Rasmussen (born 1937), Norwegian engineer and ship owner
- Einar Rose (1898–1979) Norwegian entertainer
- Einar Sagstuen (born 1951), Norwegian cross country skier
- Einar Schleef (1944–2001), German dramatist, painter, set director, writer, and actor
- Einar Sigurdsson (died 1020), Norse royal
- Einar Skavlan (1882–1954), Norwegian journalist
- Einar Selvik (born 1979), Norwegian musician (Wardruna, Gorgoroth)
- Einar Solberg, Norwegian keyboardist and composer (Emperor and Leprous)
- Einar Söderqvist (1921–1996), Swedish athlete
- Einar Sommerfeldt (1889–1976), Norwegian rower
- Einar Soone (born 1947), Estonian clergyman
- Einar Sörensen (1875–1941), Swedish fencer
- Einar Stavang (1898–1992) Norwegian politician
- Einar Stray (born 1990), Norwegian musician and composer (Einar Stray Orchestra)
- Einar Strøm (disambiguation)
- Einar Aaron Swan (1903–1940), American musician
- Einar Thambarskelfir (c. 980–c. 1050) Norwegian noble and politician
- Einar Thorsteinn (1942–2015), Icelandic architect
- Einar Tørnquist (born 1982), Norwegian entertainer
- Einar Vallbaum (born 1959), Estonian economist and politician
- Einar Vilhjálmsson (born 1960), Icelandic javelin thrower
- Einar Westerberg (1893–1976), Swedish flight surgeon

== As middle name ==
- Ole Einar Bjørndalen (born 1974), Norwegian professional biathlete
- Carl-Einar Häckner (born 1969), Swedish illusionist, actor and comedian
- Kenneth Einar Himma, American philosopher, author, lawyer, academic and lecturer
- Bjørn Einar Romøren (born 1981), Norwegian ski jumper
- Jan Einar Thorsen (born 1966), Norwegian Alpine skier

== Last name ==
- Kristján Einar (born 1989), Icelandic racing driver

== In popular culture ==
- Einar, a war general in the fantasy game HeroScape
- Einar, a race of dwarves in the Dragonlance fiction
- Einar, a slave in the Vinland Saga manga series by Makoto Yukimura
- Einar Danaan, called the Autumn King, a character in the fantasy series Crescent City written by Sarah J. Maas
- Einar, an artificially intelligent fisherman in the fantasy game Palia by Singularity6
- Einhar, the Beastmaster from Path of Exile. He himself confirms the name's origin by mentioning it means "lone fighter".

== See also ==
- Einer (disambiguation)
- Ejner
- Ejnar
- Enar
