= Ejnar =

Ejnar is a masculine given name and may refer to:

- Ejnar Dyggve (1887–1961), Danish architect and archeologist
- Ejnar Emborg (1888–1963), Danish composer
- Ejnar Hansen (1898–1947), Danish wrestler
- Ejnar Hertzsprung (1873–1967), Danish chemist and astronomer
- Ejnar Jacobsen (1897–1970), Danish composer
- Ejnar Martin Kjær (1893–1947), Danish politician
- Ejnar Levison (1880–1970), Danish fencer
- Ejnar Mikkelsen (1880–1971), Danish polar explorer and author, born in Jutland
- Ejnar Nielsen (1872–1956), Danish visual artist
- Ejnar Olsson (1896–1925), Swedish ice hockey player
- Ejnar Mindedal Rasmussen (1892–1975), Danish architect
- Ejnar Sylvest (1880–1972), Danish physician
- Ejnar Tønsager (1888–1967), Norwegian rower

Middle name

- Anders Ejnar Andersen (1912–2006), Danish politician

== See also ==
- Einar
- Einer (disambiguation)
- Ejner
