= Tanngrisnir and Tanngnjóstr =

Pair of goats in Norse mythology

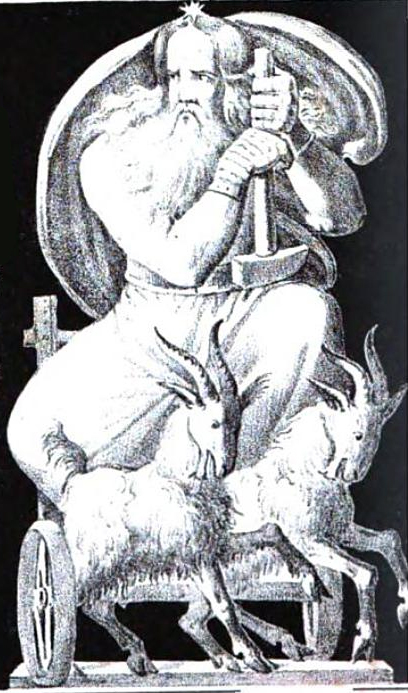
The goats Tanngrisnir and Tanngnjóstr pull the chariot of the god Thor in an illustration from 1832.

Tanngrisnir (Old Norse: [ˈtɑnːˌɡrisnez̠]) and Tanngnjóstr ([ˈtɑnːˌɡnjoːstz̠]) are the goats who pull the chariot of the god Thor in Norse mythology. They are attested in the Poetic Edda, compiled in the 13th century from earlier traditional sources, and the Prose Edda, written by Snorri Sturluson in the 13th century.

The Prose Edda relates that when Thor cooks the goats, their flesh provides sustenance for the god, and, after Thor resurrects them with his hammer, Mjölnir, they are brought back to life the next day. According to the same source, Thor once stayed a night at the home of peasant farmers and shared with them his goat meal, yet one of their children, Þjálfi, broke one of the bones to suck out the marrow, resulting in the lameness of one of the goats upon resurrection. As a result, Thor maintains Þjálfi and his sister Röskva as his servants. Scholars have linked the ever-replenishing goats to the nightly-consumed beast Sæhrímnir in Norse mythology and Scandinavian folk beliefs involving herring bones and witchcraft.

== Etymology ==
The Old Norse name Tanngrisnir translates to "teeth-barer, snarler" and Tanngnjóstr to "teeth-grinder, teeth-gnasher". Scholar Rudolf Simek comments that the names were young when recorded, and may have been inventions of Snorri. Tanngnjóstr is sometimes modernly anglicized as Tanngiost.

== Attestations ==
=== Poetic Edda ===
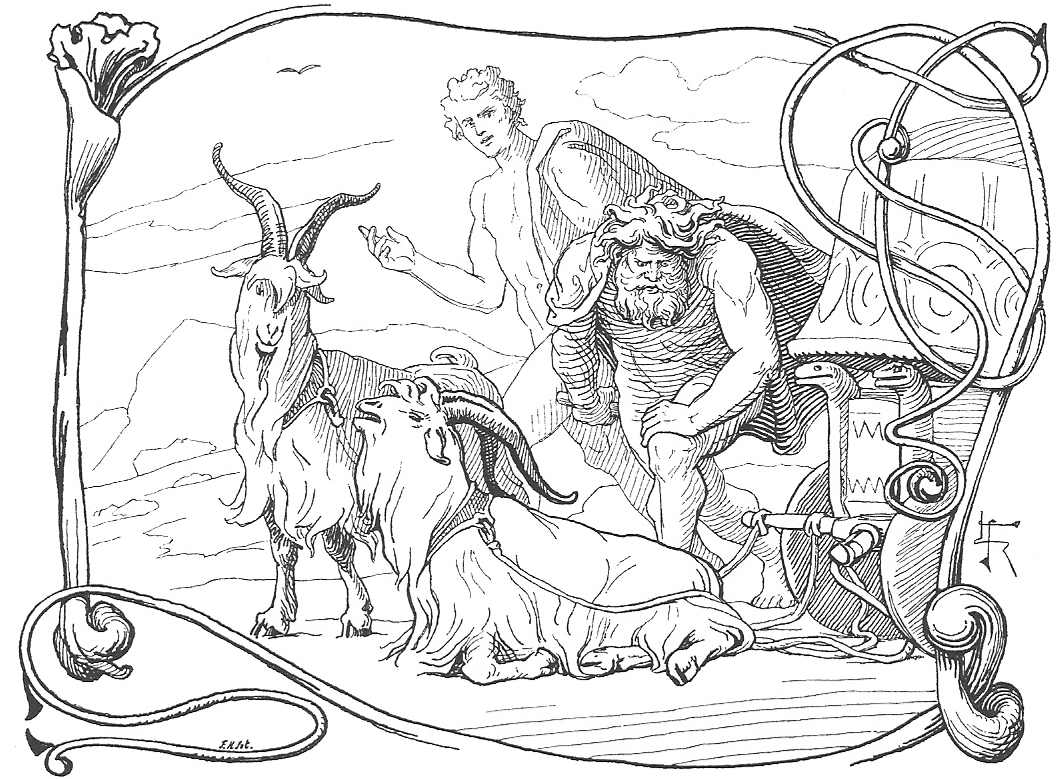
Thor notices that one of his goats has a lame leg in an illustration (1895) by Lorenz Frølich

Thor's goats are mentioned in two poems in the Poetic Edda, though they are not referred to by name. In the Poetic Edda poem Hymiskviða, Thor secures the goats, described as having "splendid horns", with a human named Egil in the realm of Midgard before Thor and the god Tyr continue to the jötunn Hymir's hall. Later in the same poem Thor is referred to as "lord of goats".

After having killed Hymir and his many-headed army, Thor's goats collapse, "half-dead", due to lameness. The poem says that this is the fault of Loki, yet that "you have heard this already", and that another, wiser than the poet, could tell the story of how Thor was repaid by a lava-dweller with his children.

A stanza from the Poetic Edda poem Þrymskviða describes Thor's goat-driven ride to Jötunheimr:

Benjamin Thorpe translation:

Straightway were the goats homeward driven,
hurried to the traces; they had fast to run.
The rocks were shivered, the earth was in a blaze;
Odin's son drove to Jötunheim.

Henry Adams Bellows translation:

Then home the goats to the hall were driven,
They wrenched at the halters, swift were they to run;
The mountains burst, earth burned with fire,
And Odin's son sought Jotunheim.

=== Prose Edda ===
In chapter 21 of the Prose Edda book Gylfaginning, the enthroned figure of High divulges that the god Thor has two goats that drive his chariot and that these goats bear the names Tanngnjóstr and Tanngrisnir.

In chapter 44, the enthroned figure of Third reluctantly relates a tale in which Thor and Loki are riding in Thor's chariot, pulled by his two goats. Loki and Thor stop at the home of a peasant farmer, and there they are given lodging for a night. Thor slaughters his goats, skins them and puts them in a pot. When the goats are cooked, Loki and Thor sit down for their evening meal. Thor invites the peasant family to share the meal with him and they do so.

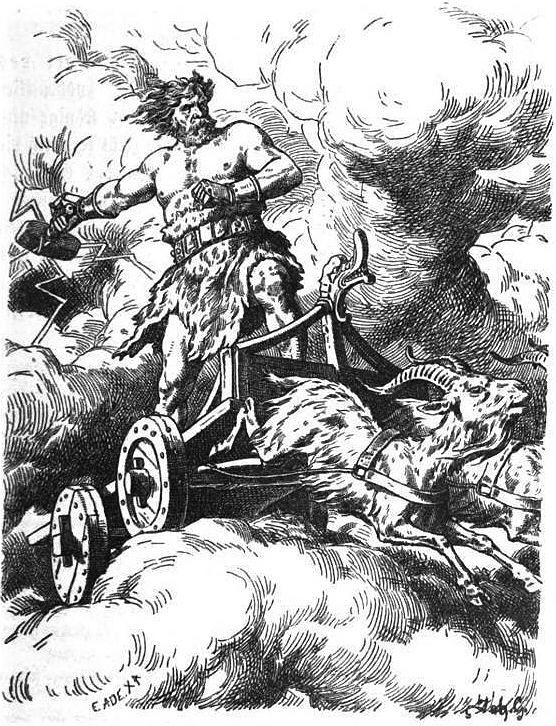
Thor (1910) by Johannes Gehrts

At the end of the meal, Thor places the skins of the goat on the opposing side of the fire and tells the peasants to throw the bones of the goats on to the goatskins. The peasant's son Þjálfi takes one of the goat ham-bones and uses a knife to split it open, breaking the bone to get to the marrow.

After staying the night at the peasants house, Thor wakes up and gets dressed before the break of dawn. Thor takes his hammer Mjöllnir, raises it, and blesses the goat skins. Resurrected, the goats stand, but one of the two goats is lame in the hind leg. Noting this new lameness, Thor exclaims that someone has mistreated the bones of his goats; that someone broke the ham-bone during the meal the night before. Third notes that there is no need to draw out the tale, for:

Everyone can imagine how terrified the peasant must have been when he saw Thor making his brows sink down over his eyes; as for what could be seen of the eyes themselves, he thought he would collapse at just the very sight. Thor clenched his hands on the shaft of the hammer so that the knuckles went white, and the peasant did as one might expect, and all his household, they cried out fervently, begged for grace, offered to atone with all their possessions.

At realizing how terrified he has made the peasants, Thor calms down and from them accepted a settlement of their children Þjálfi and Röskva. The two children become his servants and have remained so since. Leaving the goats behind, the four then set out for the land of Jötunheimr. The goats are again mentioned in chapter 48, where Thor is described as setting out to Midgard, the realm of mankind, in the form of a young boy, without goats or companions.

In chapter 75 of the Prose Edda book Skáldskaparmál, the names of both goats appear among a list of names for goats.

== Theories and interpretations ==
Scholar Rudolf Simek connects Tanngrisnir and Tanngnjóstr with the beast Sæhrímnir (consumed nightly by the gods and the einherjar and rejuvenated every day), noting that this may point to sacrificial rites in shamanic practices.

In Scandinavian folklore, witches who magically replenish food sometimes appear in tales, the food usually being herring. However, in fear that one would waste away if one were fed the same morsel again and again, folk tales describe the breaking of the herring bones when eating it as a form of precaution. Thematic similarities—bone breaking ending food rejuvenation—between this folk belief and the Old Norse tales of Tanngrisnir and Tanngnjóstr have led scholars Reimund Kvideland and Henning Sehmsdorf to highlight a connection between the two.

== Modern influence ==
Tanngrisnir and Tanngnjóstr have been adapted in Marvel Comics as Toothgnasher and Toothgrinder.

In the film adaptation of the Speed Racer manga franchise, there is a racecar named after Tanngrisnir, driven by Gothorm Danneskjøld, who is appropriately dressed as a Viking and sponsored by a company called Thor-Axine, referring to the chariot.

In the Yu-Gi-Oh Trading Card Game, both Tanngrisnir and Tanngnjóstr are represented as "Nordic Beast" Monster Cards. They are meant to be used in conjunction with other cards representative of other characters and creatures from Norse mythology, including their master Thor.

In Rick Riordan's book Magnus Chase and the Gods of Asgard: The Sword of Summer, both Tanngrisnir and Tanngnjóstr appeared. They are called Marvin and Otis, respectively, in the book and they are commonly sacrificed by the god Thor, to be reborn the next day.

In Heidevolk's song "Een met de storm", the "dondergod" (thunder god) rides in a "bokkenkar" (goat cart) over the clouds, alluding to Thor's two goats.

In the 2018 video-game God of War, the Grip of Tanngiost is a blade pommel that causes shock damage, which can be used on the Leviathan Axe.

Both goats appear in the Danish Valhalla comics series, and the animated feature based on it. The god Thor butchers and cooks one of the rams but strongly warns against breaking the bones. Loki persuades Tjalfe (Þjálfi) into sucking the marrow from a leg bone from one of the goats. When Thor resurrects the goats the next morning, he finds that one of the goats is lame in the leg and becomes enraged. As a result, Thor maintains Tjalfe and his sister as his servants.

Both goats appear in the game Super Auto Pets as Tandgnost and Tandgrisner. There is a food called the Yggdrasil Fruit that summons both of them.

== See also ==
- Heiðrún, a goat that lives on top of the afterlife hall Valhalla
- Rebirth in Norse religion
- Yule goat, a Scandinavian Yule tradition
