= Andhrímnir =

Norse mythological chef

Andhrímnir (Old Norse "the one exposed to soot" A combination of 'and-' and 'hrīm') is the chef of the Æsir and einherjar in Norse mythology. Every day in Valhalla, he slaughters the beast Sæhrímnir and cooks it in Eldhrímnir, his cauldron. At night, Sæhrímnir is restored to life to be eaten again the next day. He also makes the Æsir's mead from the milk of Heiðrún, a goat.
