= Einari =

Estonian and Finnish male given name

- Gender: Male
- Language: Finnish, Estonian
- Name day: 17 November (both Finland and Estonia)

Origin
- Region of origin: Finland, Estonia

Other names
- Related names: Einar

Einari is a Finnish and Estonian masculine given name, a cognate to the Scandinavian given name Einar.

People named Einari include:

- Einari Aalto (1926–1985), Finnish swimmer
- Einari Teräsvirta (1914–1995), Finnish gymnast and architect
- Einari Vuorela (1889–1972), Finnish writer
