= Ejner =

Ejner is a male given name. The following is a list of notable persons with that name:

- Ejner Augsburg (1892–1971), Danish modern pentathlete
- Ejner Bech (1912–1956), Danish racewalker
- Ejner Federspiel (1896–1981), Danish film actor
- Ejner Johansson (1922–2001), Danish art historian, writer, and director
- Ejner Larsen (1917–1987), Danish furniture designer

== See also ==
- Einar
- Einer (disambiguation)
- Ejnar
