= Bornholm disease =

- Other names: Epidemic pleurodynia, epidemic myalgia, devils grip, Bamble disease
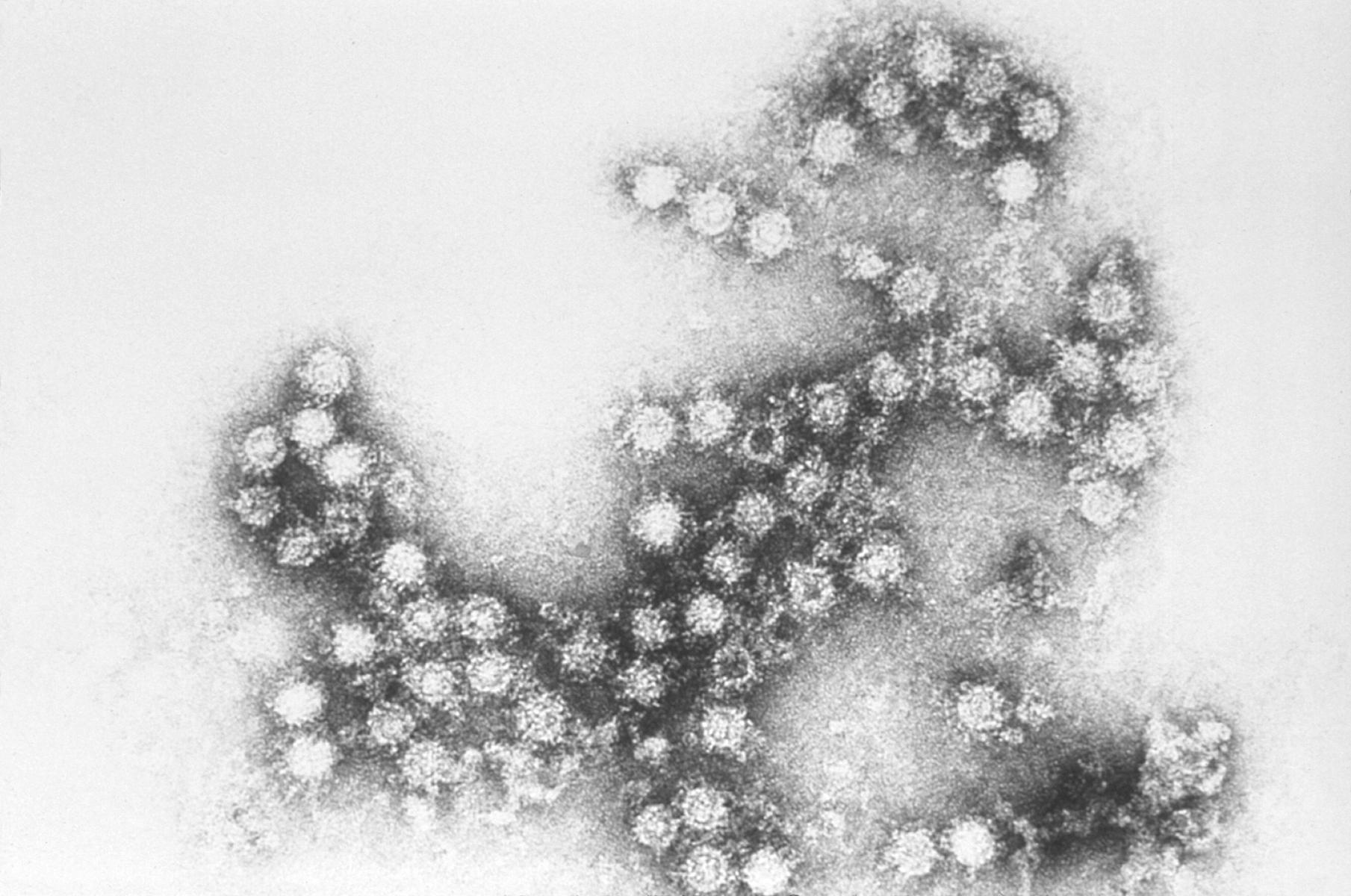
- Coxsackie B virus, the most common cause of Bornholm disease
- Pronunciation: Born-howlm
- Specialty: Infectious diseases
- Symptoms: intermittent pleuritic chest pain, intermittent abdominal pain, fever
- Complications: rare complications include myocarditis, respiratory failure, hepatic necrosis with coagulopathy, and disseminated intravascular coagulopathy (DIC)
- Duration: between one day and one week
- Causes: Coxsackie B, Coxsackie A, Echovirus
- Diagnostic method: clinical diagnosis after ruling out more emergent causes of chest and abdominal pain
- Differential diagnosis: Acute appendicitis, cholecystitis, pancreatitis, pulmonary embolism, acute coronary syndrome, costochondritis, amongst others
- Prevention: Hand hygiene
- Treatment: NSAIDs, intercostal Lidocaine injections, symptomatic treatment
- Prognosis: Favorable
- Deaths: None reported

Bornholm disease, also known as epidemic pleurodynia, is a condition characterized by myositis of the abdomen or chest caused by the Coxsackie B virus or other viruses. The myositis manifests as an intermittent stabbing pain in the musculature that is seen primarily in children and young adults.

It is named after the Danish island of Bornholm in the Baltic Sea where an outbreak was one of the first to be described.

== Signs and symptoms ==
The expected symptoms of Bornholm disease include fever, pleuritic chest pain, or epigastric abdominal pain that is frequently spasmodic. Bornholm associated chest pain is distinguished by attacks of severe pain in the lower chest, often on the right side. In a prior study, the episodes were shown to last five to ten minutes and then subside for thirty minutes. The pain is exacerbated by movement and makes walking and breathing more difficult. Patients have found relief from the pain by lying still for a brief period of time. The slightest movement of the rib cage causes a sharp increase in pain, which makes it difficult to breathe, although it generally passes off before any actual harm occurs. The attacks are unpredictable and strike "out of the blue" with a feeling like an iron grip around the rib cage. The colloquial names for the disease, such as the devil's grip, (see "other names" below) reflect this symptom. Bornholm disease is a clinical diagnosis that uses the spasmodic pain, fever, and relapses to distinguish the illness from other potential causes of pain such as appendicitis or myocardial infarction. Tachycardia and arrhythmias have been found with Bornholm disease by using an electrocardiogram (ECG). Murmurs, rubs, and pericardial effusions have been detected on physical examination. Maculopapular rashes can also be present with Bornholm disease

== Etiology ==
Inoculation of throat washings taken from people with this disease into the brains of newborn mice revealed that enteroviruses in the Coxsackie B virus group were likely to be the cause of pleurodynia, and those findings were supported by subsequent studies of IgM antibody responses measured in serum from people with pleurodynia. Other viruses in the enterovirus family, including echovirus and Coxsackie A virus, are less frequently associated with pleurodynia. Echovirus types 1,6,8,9, and 19 and Coxsackie A virus types 4,6,9, and 10 are associated with Bornholm disease. The most common strains causing Bornholm disease are Coxsackie B3 and A9. Viral proliferation in the muscles of the chest wall, diaphragm, and abdomen are thought to contribute to the typical presentation that characterizes the illness.

== Epidemiology ==
The most common cause of Bornholm disease, Coxsackie B virus, is shed in large amounts in the feces of infected persons and is spread primarily through the fecal-oral route. Respiratory secretions and oral-oral methods have also shown to be modes of transmission. In previous cases the disease has been spread by sharing drink containers, and has been contracted by laboratory personnel working with the virus. The pharynx is typically the initial site for entering the body, however the virus will proliferate in lymphatic tissues and use the blood stream to reach the muscles and produce symptoms. Preventative measures to decrease transmission of the virus causing Bornholm disease emphasize hand hygiene. In previous studies of Bornholm disease the majority of the patients affected were children.

== Physical exam findings ==
In a studied case of Bornholm disease the chest pain was unable to be reproduced on palpation and failed to improve with changes in position. The pain was made worse during deep inhalation. A pleural rub was present, however lung auscultation was clear and rashes were absent.

== Laboratory findings and imaging ==
In a prior case of Bornholm disease the laboratory results showed the white blood cell count, hemoglobin, hematocrit, creatinine, liver function test (LFT), troponin, and creatine kinase (CK) were all within normal limits. The chest x-ray showed bilateral pleural effusions which resolved after infection. The erythrocyte sedimentation rate (ESR) and C-reactive protein (CRP) levels were found to be elevated. The electrocardiogram (EKG) did not show any abnormalities related to ischemia.

== Treatment and prognosis ==
Treatment is symptomatic and includes the administration of non-steroidal anti-inflammatory agents or the application of heat to the affected muscles. Intercostal 2% xylocaine injections with normal saline have been used to relieve symptoms in certain cases. Relapses during the weeks following the initial episode are a characteristic feature of this disease. Bornholm disease typically lasts between one day and one week with an average illness duration of four days. In 20% of cases studied, the illness lasted between one and two weeks. The illness in children was found to be shorter than the illness in adults. Patients typically make a complete recovery with supportive care. Although recovering from Bornholm disease is expected, some rare complications include myocarditis, respiratory failure, hepatic necrosis with coagulopathy, and disseminated intravascular coagulopathy (DIC). Aseptic meningitis, pericarditis and pleurisy are also known potential complications of Bornholm disease. Another uncommon complication is orchitis that manifests as unilateral testicular pain and swelling in the days or weeks following the expected symptoms of Bornholm disease.

== Differential diagnoses ==
Acute appendicitis, cholecystitis, pancreatitis, pulmonary embolism, acute coronary syndrome, costochondritis, amongst others

== History ==
In 1872, Anders Daae and Christian Horrebow Homann reported an epidemic of pleurodynia occurring in Bamble Municipality in Norway, giving rise to the name "Bamble disease". Subsequent reports, published only in Norwegian, referred to the disease by this name. Niels Ryberg Finsen also described the disease in Iceland in 1874. In 1933, Ejnar Sylvest gave a doctoral thesis describing a Danish outbreak of this disease on Bornholm Island entitled "Bornholm disease-myalgia epidemica", and this name has persisted. In 1949 the Coxsackie B virus was isolated and established as an etiology of Bornholm disease.

== Other names ==
Bornholm disease is also known as Bamble disease, the devil's grip, devil's grippe, epidemic myalgia, epidemic pleurodynia.
