= Harii =

Germanic people

The Harii (West Germanic "warriors") were, according to a single brief remark by the 1st century CE Roman historian Tacitus, a Germanic people; the most powerful of the Lugian group of states (civitates), who in turn dominated a large part of the Suebian part of Germania in an area north of the Sudeten and Carpathian Mountains, in the region of present day Poland and eastern Germany.

In his work Germania, Tacitus says the Harii used black shields and painted their bodies black (nigra scuta, tincta corpora), attacking at night as a shadowy army, much to the terror of their opponents. Theories have been proposed connecting the Harii to the einherjar, ghostly warriors in service to the god Odin, attested much later among the North Germanic peoples by way of Norse mythology, and to the tradition of the Wild Hunt, a procession of the dead through the winter night sky sometimes led by Odin.

== Germania ==
Regarding the Harii, Tacitus writes in Germania:

As for the Harii, quite apart from their strength, which exceeds that of the other tribes I have just listed, they pander to their innate savagery by skill and timing: with black shields and painted bodies, they choose dark nights to fight, and by means of terror and shadow of a ghostly army they cause panic, since no enemy can bear a sight so unexpected and hellish; in every battle the eyes are the first to be conquered.

== Theories ==
According to John Lindow, Andy Orchard, and Rudolf Simek, connections are commonly drawn between the Harii and the einherjar of Norse mythology; those that have died and gone to Valhalla ruled over by the god Odin, preparing for the events of Ragnarök.

Lindow writes that regarding the theorized connection between the Harii and the Einherjar, "many scholars think there may be basis for the myth in an ancient Odin cult, which would be centered on young warriors who entered into an ecstatic relationship with Odin" and that the name Harii has been etymologically connected to the -herjar element of einherjar.

Simek says that since the connection has become widespread, "one tends to interpret these obviously living armies of the dead as religiously motivated bands of warriors, who led to the formation of the concept of the einherjar as well as the Wild Hunt".

== In works ==
- Heilung - Heilung's Warrior Choir is inspired by the Harii tribe.

== See also ==
- Einherjar
- Furor Teutonicus
- Männerbund
