= Einer =

Einer may refer to:

- 11728 Einer, a main-belt asteroid
- Hans Einer (1856–1927), an Estonian teacher, author and public figure
- Lauri Einer (born 1931), Estonian politician

== Given name ==
- Einer Bankz American musician
- Einer Boberg (1935–1995), a Danish-Canadian speech pathologist
- Einer Jensen (1899–1976), a Danish boxer
- Einer P. Lund (born 1903), an American politician
- Einer Nielsen (1894–1965), a Danish spiritualist
- Einer Rubio (born 1998), Colombian cyclist
- Einer Ulrich (1896–1969), a Danish tennis player
- Einer Viveros (born 1970), a Colombian football player

== See also ==
- Einar
- Ejnar
- Ejner
