= Enar =

Enar is a Nordic male given name. Notable people with this name include:

- Enar Bolaños (born 1983), Costa Rican striker
- Enar Edberg (1936–2013), Swedish weightlifter
- Enar Josefsson (1916–1989), Swedish cross-country skier
- Enar Jääger (born 1984), Estonian football player

== See also ==
- Einar
- European Network Against Racism
