= Einārs =

Ēriks
- Gender: Male
- Language: Latvian
- Name day: 9 May

Origin
- Origin: Old Norse
- Region of origin: Latvia

Other names
- Related names: Einar

Einārs, or Einars, is a Latvian masculine given name, which is the cognate of the given name Einar. People bearing the name Einārs include:

- Einārs Gņedojs (born 1965), Latvian footballer
- Einars Repše (born 1961), Latvian politician, physicist, financier
- Einārs Tupurītis (born 1973), Latvian middle distance runner
