= Einar Ólafsson =

Einar Ólafsson may refer to:

- Einar Ólafsson (basketball) (1928–2025), Icelandic basketball coach
- Einar Ólafsson (skier) (born 1962), Icelandic Olympic cross country skier
- Einar Ólafsson (handballer) (born 2001), Icelandic handballer
