= Ejnar Sylvest =

Danish family physician who described Bornholm disease

Ejnar Sylvest (1880 – 1972) was a Danish family physician who described Bornholm disease or the "devil's grip" following an outbreak affecting 23 fisherman in Melstedgård and Gudhjem whilst on holiday on Bornholm Island, Denmark.
