= Ejnar Olsson =

Swedish ice hockey player

Ejnar Carl "Hund-Eje" Olsson (July 9, 1896 – January 24, 1925) was a Swedish ice hockey player, who competed in the 1924 Winter Olympics.

In 1924, he was a member of the Swedish ice hockey team, which finished fourth in the Olympic ice hockey tournament. He played four matches as goaltender.

In those days, Swedish hockey was still being played on lakes. The 1925 winter was unusually mild, and "Hund-Eje" became its most notable casualty when he drowned in Lake Norrviken while ice skating.
