= Einar Strøm =

Einar Strøm may refer to:

- Einar Strøm (gymnast) (1885–1964), Norwegian gymnast
- Einar Strøm (politician) (born 1945), Norwegian politician
