= Einar Olsen =

Einar Olsen may refer to:

- Einar Olsen (gymnast) (1893–1949), Danish Olympic gymnast
- Einar Olsen (editor) (born 1936), Norwegian newspaper editor
- Einar Olsson (footballer), Swedish footballer
