= Sæhrímnir =

Creature in Norse mythology

In Norse mythology, Sæhrímnir is the creature killed and eaten every night by the Æsir and einherjar. The cook of the gods, Andhrímnir, is responsible for the slaughter of Sæhrímnir and its preparation in the cauldron Eldhrímnir. After Sæhrímnir is eaten, the beast is brought back to life again to provide sustenance for the following day. Sæhrímnir is attested in the Poetic Edda, compiled in the 13th century from earlier traditional material, and the Prose Edda, written in the 13th century by Snorri Sturluson.

The enthroned figure of High quotes this stanza in the Prose Edda book Gylfaginning and specifically states that Sæhrímnir is a boar. However, some scholars have translated the Poetic Edda attestation, which the Prose Edda attestation quotes, as not referring to the creature as any specific type. Those scholars who recognize a difference in the taxonomy of the creature between the two sources have commented on the matter, further issues have been raised about the apparently contradictory etymology of the name of the creature in relation to its apparent status as a boar, and some scholars have theorized that the ritual killing of the animal may ultimately stem from religious practices in Germanic paganism.

== Etymology ==
The etymology of the Old Norse name Sæhrímnir is problematic; in contradiction to the Gylfaginning (and, depending upon translator, Grímnismál) description of the animal as a boar, Sæhrímnir is, in modern scholarship, commonly proposed to mean "sooty sea-beast" or "sooty sea-animal" (which may be connected to Old Norse seyðir, meaning 'cooking ditch'). Attempts at explaining the apparent contradiction have been made by scholars (see theories section below).

The cauldron Eldhrímnir is interpreted as Old Norse "fire-sooty".

== Attestations ==
Sæhrímnir is mentioned once in the Poetic Edda and twice in the Prose Edda. In the Poetic Edda poem Grímnismál, Grímnir (the god Odin in disguise) comments on the creature. Translations of the stanza vary:

Benjamin Thorpe translation: Andhrimnir makes, in Eldhrimnir, Sæhrimnir to boil, of meats the best; but few know how many Einheriar it feeds.	Henry Adams Bellows translation: In Eldrhimnir Andrhrimnir cooks Sæhrimnir’s seething flesh,— The best of food, but few men know On what fare the warriors feast.	Lee M. Hollander translation: By Andhrímnir in Eldrímnir Sæhrímnir, the boar, is boiled, the best of bacons; though 'tis barely known what the einherjar eat.	Anthony Faulkes translation: Andrhrimnir has Sæhrimnir cooked in Eldrhrimnir, best of meats. But there are few that know on what the Einheriar feed.

In chapter 38 of the Prose Edda book Gylfaginning, Gangleri (king Gylfi in disguise) comments that "you say that all those men that have fallen in battle since the beginning of the world have now come to Odin in Val-hall. What has he got to offer them food? I should have thought that there must be a pretty large number there." High replies that it is true there are a pretty large number of men there, adding many more have yet to arrive, yet that "there will seem too few when the wolf comes." However, High adds that food is not a problem because there will never be so many people in Valhalla that the meat of Sæhrímnir (which he specifically calls a boar) cannot sufficiently feed them. High adds that Sæhrímnir is cooked every day by the cook Andhrímnir in the pot Eldhrimnir, and is again whole every evening. High then quotes the above-mentioned Grímnismál stanza in support. Gangleri then asks if Odin eats the same, to which High responds that Odin gives the food on his table to his wolves, for Odin himself consumes only wine and needs no food (and again High thereafter quotes a stanza from Grímnismál in support).

A final mention of the beast appears in a list of hog names in the Nafnaþulur section of the Prose Edda book Skáldskaparmál.

== Theories ==
Scholar Rudolf Simek comments that the theme of the eternally renewing beast is also found in myths of the god Thor's goats (Tanngrisnir and Tanngnjóstr) and may point to sacrificial rites in shamanic practices. Simek finds a difference between the Grímnismál and Gylfaginning and explains it as a result of an embellishment on Snorri's part, which he says owes more to the introduction of "characteristics of a medieval paradise".

19th century scholar Jacob Grimm says that no information has survived about the worship of heroes in Germanic paganism (as opposed to the worship of the gods) but proposes a potential connection between Sæhrímnir and hero worship:

Grecian sacrifices to heroes differed from those offered to gods: a god had only the viscera and fat of the beast presented to him, and was content with the mounting odour; a deified hero must have the very flesh and blood to consume. Thus the einherjar admitted into Valhöll feast on the boiled flesh of the boar Sæhrîmnir, and drink with the Ases; it is never said that the Ases shared in the food [...]. Are we to infer from this a difference in the sacrifices offered to gods and to demigods?"

== See also ==
- Rebirth in Norse religion
