= Einar Eriksson =

Swedish weightlifter (1921–2009)

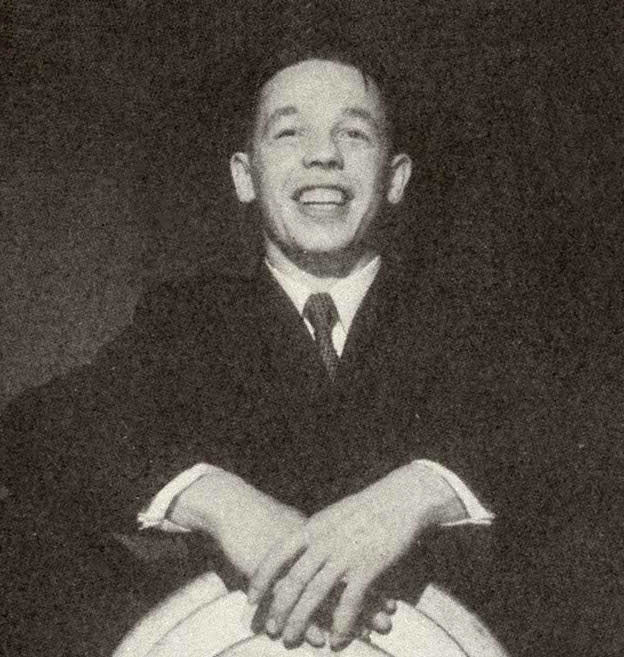

Personal information
- Born: 20 October 1921 Ljusdal, Sweden
- Died: 5 August 2009 (aged 87) Enköping, Sweden
- Weight: 60 kg (132 lb)

Sport
- Sport: Weightlifting
- Club: Sundbybergs TK
Medal record
Representing Sweden
World Weightlifting Championships
Bronze medal – third place	1953 Stockholm	-60 kg
European Weightlifting Championships
Bronze medal – third place	1950 Paris	-60 kg
Bronze medal – third place	1953 Stockholm	-60 kg

Einar Sven Axel Eriksson (20 October 1921 – 5 August 2009) was a Swedish featherweight weightlifter who won three bronze medals at the world and European Championships in 1950 and 1953. He placed 17th at the 1952 Summer Olympics.
