= Rebirth in Germanic paganism =

Reincarnation in Germanic paganism

Surviving texts indicate that there was a belief in rebirth in Germanic paganism. Examples occur in eddic poetry and sagas, potentially associated with naming and/or through the family line. Scholars have discussed the implications of these attestations and proposed theories regarding belief in reincarnation among the Germanic peoples prior to Christianization and potentially to some extent in folk belief thereafter.

== Attestations ==
=== Roman ===
In the 2nd century CE, Appian wrote in his Roman History that the Teutons had no fear of death because they hoped to be reborn.

=== Medieval ===
In the Helgi lays of the Poetic Edda, Helgi and his valkyrie lover are said to have been reborn: in the prose at the end of "Helgakviða Hjörvarðssonar", there is a statement that Helgi Hjörvarðsson and Sváva were subsequently born again, and at the end of "Helgakviða Hundingsbana II", that according to "ancient lore" now dismissed as "old women's lying tales", Helgi Sigmundsson was reborn as Helgi Haddingjaskati (prince of the Haddingjar) and Sigrún as Kara Hálfdanardóttir. Conversely in "Sigurðarkviða hin skamma", Högni expresses the wish that Brynhildr not be reborn.

In the Flateyjarbók version of Óláfs saga helga, the "Þáttr Ólafs Geirstaða Alfs" recounts how the dead Ólaf Geirstaða Álfr gives instructions in a dream for his barrow to be robbed and his body mutilated, and his belt used to ease the birth of a boy who is to be named after him and given his sword and knife; the boy becomes Olaf II of Norway, St. Olaf, and is rumoured among his followers to be the earlier Olaf reincarnated. Nora Chadwick suggested that in the older Olaf's name and elsewhere, the álfar (elves) referred to souls awaiting rebirth.

There are also mentions in two legendary sagas of boys being born with the marks of wounds that were dealt to an ancestor: in Gautreks saga, a poem by Starkaðr alludes to the marks supposedly on his body from his grandfather's eight arms being torn off by the god Thor, and in one version of Þórðar saga hræðu, Þórðr is born with a mark on his left arm corresponding to a wound his father had received.

== Names ==
In "Helgakviða Hundingsbana II", the second Helgi receives his name while sitting on a barrow; King Olaf was named after a man buried in a barrow at the latter's request; and in another tale in Flateyjarbók and in Vatnsdæla saga, Svarfdæla saga and Finnboga saga, dead and dying men ask for their names to be passed on, often to future sons of those they are speaking to. Hilda Ellis Davidson saw a connection between name-giving and the idea of rebirth in these passages. Gustav Storm proposed this interpretation in an 1893 article; a study of Icelandic genealogies by Max Keil supported the conclusion but cast into question Storm's idea that there was a change in practice from name-giving using variation to name-giving using repetition, and also distinguished a belief in rebirth from transmigration of souls as it is understood in Eastern religion, involving a progression over a series of lives.

Both scholars noted that a grandfather's name was most commonly re-used—Jan de Vries saw the derivation of the German word for 'grandson', Enkel, from Old High German eninchilî, 'little grandfather', as support for the idea that a belief in rebirth underlay the custom of skipping one generation in naming—and rarely that of a still living person, and Keil also concluded that what genealogical evidence there is on women suggests the same practice in naming as for men. Sami customs of naming also rest on a belief that people are reborn into the same family.

== Archaeology ==
K. A. Eckhardt, who published a book on the concept of rebirth within the extended family or clan, suggested that the burial position with the legs drawn up against the body emulated the position of the foetus in the womb and was therefore evidence of the belief in rebirth.

== See also ==
- Norse_cosmology#Time_and_space, discussion regarding cyclic time in Norse cosmology
- Sæhrímnir, a creature killed, eaten, and brought back to life every day in Valhalla, an afterlife hall in Norse mythology
- Tanngrisnir and Tanngnjóstr, the Germanic god Thor's goats, which may be consumed and resurrected by the god
