= Einherjar =

Dead warriors of Norse mythology

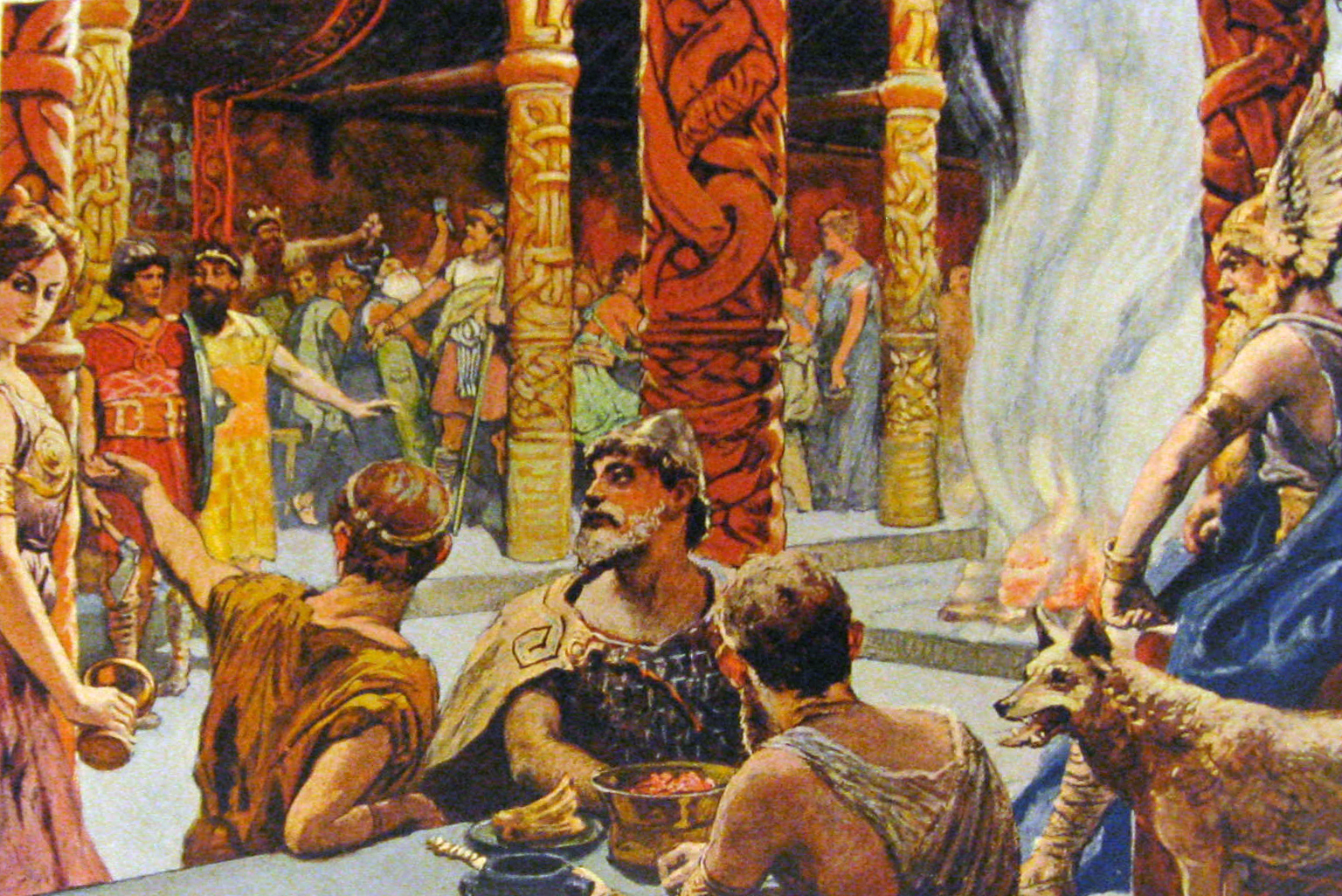
Valhalla (1905) by Emil Doepler

In Norse mythology, the einherjar (singular einheri; literally "army of one", "those who fight alone") are those who have died in battle and are brought to Valhalla by valkyries. In Valhalla, the einherjar eat their fill of the nightly resurrecting beast Sæhrímnir, and valkyries bring them mead from the udder of the goat Heiðrún. The einherjar prepare daily for the events of Ragnarök, when they will advance for an immense battle at the field of Vígríðr.

The einherjar are attested in the Poetic Edda, compiled in the 13th century from earlier traditional sources, the Prose Edda, written in the 13th century by Snorri Sturluson, the poem Hákonarmál (by the 10th century skald Eyvindr skáldaspillir) as collected in Heimskringla, and a stanza of an anonymous 10th century poem commemorating the death of Eric Bloodaxe known as Eiríksmál as compiled in Fagrskinna.

An etymological connection exists between the einherjar and the Harii, a Germanic people or figures from early Germanic folklore attested in the 1st century AD, and scholars have connected the einherjar to the eternal battle of Hjaðningavíg and the Wild Hunt. The einherjar have been the subject of works of art and poetry.

== Attestations ==
=== Poetic Edda ===
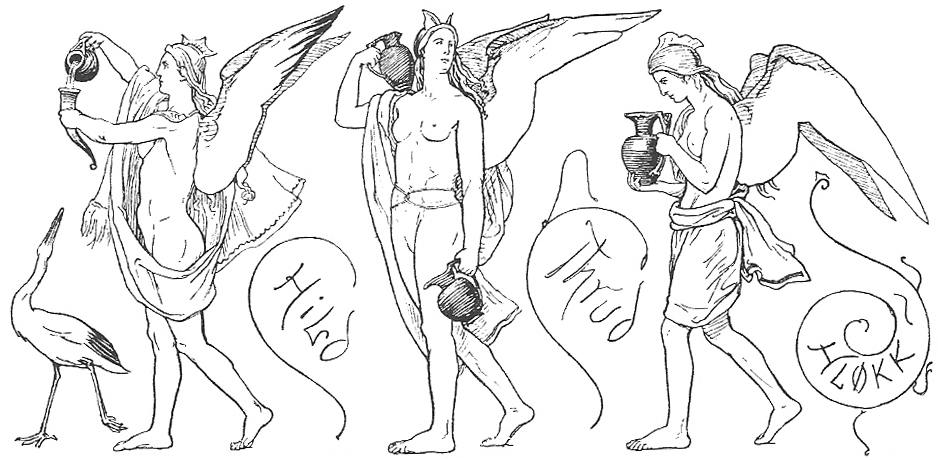
Three valkyries bearing ale in Valhalla (1895) by Lorenz Frølich

In the poem Vafþrúðnismál, Óðinn engages the wise jötunn Vafþrúðnir in a game of wits. Disguised as Gagnráðr, Óðinn asks Vafþrúðnir "where men fight in courts every day." Vafþrúðnir responds that (here einherjar is translated as einheriar):

All the Einheriar fight in Odin's courts
every day;
they choose the slain and ride from battle;
then they sit more at peace together.

In the poem Grímnismál, Óðinn (disguised as Grímnir) tells the young Agnarr Geirröðsson that the cook Andhrímnir boils the beast Sæhrímnir, which he refers to as "the best of pork", in the container Eldhrímnir, yet adds that "but few know by what the einheriar are nourished." Further into Grímnismál, Odin gives a list of valkyries (Skeggjöld, Skögul, Hildr, Þrúðr, Hlökk, Herfjötur, Göll, Geirahöð, Randgríð, Ráðgríð, and Reginleif), and states that they bear ale to the einherjar. Towards the end of the poem, another reference to the einherjar appears when Óðinn tells the king Geirröd (unaware that the man he has been torturing is Óðinn) that Geirröd is drunk, and that Geirröd loses much when he loses his favor and the favor of "all the Einherjar."

In the poem Helgakviða Hundingsbana I, the hero Sinfjötli flyts with Guðmundur. Sinfjötli accuses Guðmundur of having once been a female, including that he was "a witch, horrible, unnatural, among Odin's valkyries" and that all of the einherjar "had to fight, headstrong women, on your account".

=== Prose Edda ===
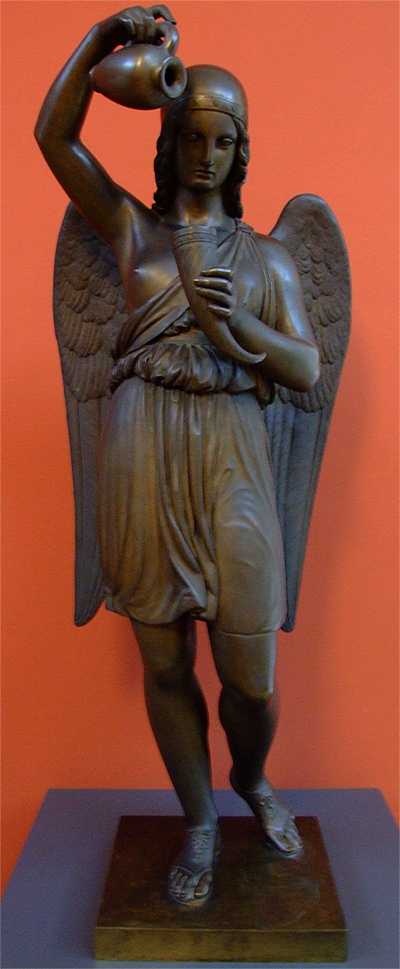
"Valkyrie" (1834–1835) by Herman Wilhelm Bissen

In the Prose Edda book Gylfaginning, the einherjar are introduced in chapter 20. In chapter 20, Third tells Gangleri (described as king Gylfi in disguise) that Óðinn is called Valföðr (Old Norse "father of the slain") "since all those who fall in battle are his adopted sons," and that Óðinn assigns them places in Valhalla and Vingólf where they are known as einherjar. In chapter 35, High quotes the Grímnismál valkyrie list, and says that these valkyries wait in Valhalla, and there serve drink, and look after tableware and drinking vessels in Valhalla. In addition, High says that Óðinn sends valkyries to every battle, that they allot death to men, and govern victory.

In chapter 38, High provides more detail about the einherjar. Gangleri says that "you say that all those men that have fallen in battle since the beginning of the world have now come to Odin in Val-hall. What has he got to offer them food? I should have thought that there must be a pretty large number there." High replies that it is true there are a pretty large number of men there, adding many more have yet to arrive, yet that "there will seem too few when the wolf comes." However, High adds that food is not a problem because there will never be too many people in Valhalla that the meat of Sæhrímnir (which he calls a boar) cannot sufficiently feed. High says that Sæhrímnir is cooked every day by the cook Andhrímnir in the pot Eldhrimnir, and is again whole every evening. High then quotes the stanza of Grímnismál mentioning the cook, meal, and container in reference.

Further into chapter 38, Gangleri asks if Óðinn consumes the same meals as the einherjar. High responds that Óðinn gives the food on his table to his two wolves Geri and Freki, and that Óðinn himself needs no food, for Óðinn gains sustenance from wine as if it were drink and meat. High then quotes another stanza from Grímnismál in reference. In chapter 39, Gangleri asks what the einherjar drink that is as plentiful as their food, and if they drink water. High responds that it is strange that Gangleri is asking if Óðinn, the All-Father, would invite kings, earls, and other "men of rank" to his home and give them water to drink. High says that he "swears by his faith" that many who come to Valhalla would think that he paid a high price for a drink of water if there were no better beverages there, after having died of wounds and in agony. High continues that atop Valhalla stands the goat Heiðrún, and it feeds on the foliage of the tree called Læraðr. From Heiðrún's udders flow mead that fills a vat a day. The vat is so large that all of the einherjar are able to drink to their fullness from it.

In chapter 40, Gangleri says that Valhalla must be an immense building, yet it must often be crowded around the doorways. High responds that there are plenty of doors, and that crowding doesn't occur around them. In support, High again quotes a stanza from Grímnismál. In chapter 41, Gangleri notes that there are very many people in Valhalla, and that Óðinn is a "very great lord when he commands such a troop". Gangleri then asks what entertainment the einherjar have when they're not drinking. High responds that every day, the einherjar get dressed and "put on war-gear and go out into the courtyard and fight each other and fall upon each other. This is their sport." High says that when dinner time arrives, the einherjar ride back to Valhalla and sit down to drink. In reference, High quotes a stanza from Grímnismál.

In chapter 51, High foretells the events of Ragnarök. After the god Heimdallr awakens all the gods by blowing his horn Gjallarhorn, they will assemble at a thing, Óðinn will ride to the well Mímisbrunnr and consult Mímir on behalf of himself and his people, the world tree Yggdrasil will shake, and then the Æsir and the einherjar will don their war gear. The Æsir and einherjar will ride to the field Vígríðr while Óðinn rides before them clad in a golden helmet, mail, and holding his spear Gungnir, and heading towards the wolf Fenrir.

In chapter 52, Gangleri asks what will happen after the heavens, earth, and all of the world are burned and the gods, einherjar and all of mankind have died, noting that he had previously been told that "everyone will live in some world or other for ever and ever." High replies with a list of locations, and then describes the re-emerging of the world after Ragnarök. The einherjar receive a final mention in the Prose Edda in chapter 2 of the book Skáldskaparmál, where a quote from the anonymous 10th century poem Eiríksmál is provided (see the Fagrskinna section below for more detail and another translation from another source):

What sort of dream is that, Odin?
I dreamed I rose up before dawn
to clear up Val-hall for slain people.
I aroused the Einheriar,
bade them get up to strew the benches,
clean the beer-cups,
the valkyries to serve wine
for the arrival of a prince.

=== Heimskringla ===
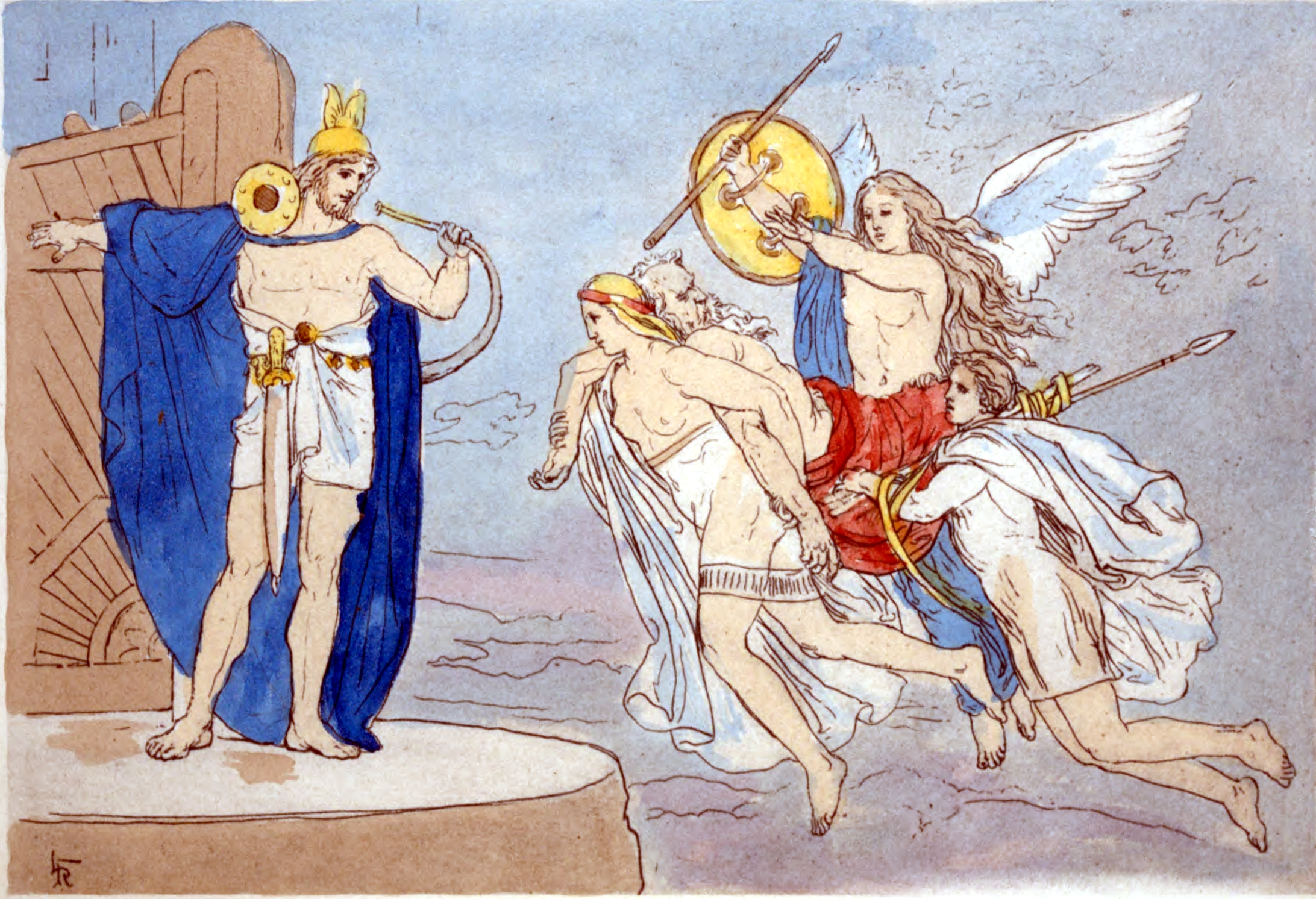
An illustration of valkyries encountering the god Heimdallr as they carry a dead man to Valhalla (1906) by Lorenz Frølich

At the end of the Heimskringla saga Hákonar saga góða, the poem Hákonarmál (by the 10th century skald Eyvindr skáldaspillir) is presented. The saga relates that king Haakon I of Norway died in battle, and yet though he is Christian, he requests that since he has died "among heathens, then give me such burial place as seems most fitting to you." The saga relates that, shortly after, Haakon died on the same slab of rock that he was born upon, that he was greatly mourned by friend and foe alike, and that his friends moved his body northward to Sæheim in North Hordaland. Haakon was there buried in a large burial mound in full armor and his finest clothing, yet with no other valuables. Further, "words were spoken over his grave according to the custom of heathen men, and they put him on the way to Valhalla." The poem Hákonarmál is then provided.

In Hákonarmál, Óðinn sends forth the two valkyries Göndul and Skögul to "choose among the kings' kinsmen" and who in battle should dwell with Óðinn in Valhalla. A battle rages with great slaughter. Haakon and his men die in battle, and they see the valkyrie Göndul leaning on a spear shaft. Göndul comments that "groweth now the gods' following, since Hákon has been with host so goodly bidden home with holy godheads." Haakon hears "what the valkyries said," and the valkyries are described as sitting "high-hearted on horseback," wearing helmets, carrying shields and that the horses wisely bore them. A brief exchange follows between Haakon and the valkyrie Skögul:

Hákon said:
'Why didst Geirskogul grudge us victory?
though worthy we were for the gods to grant it?'
Skogul said:
'Tis owing to us that the issue was won
and your foemen fled.'

Skögul says that they shall now ride forth to the "green homes of the godheads" to tell Óðinn that the king will come to Valhalla. In Valhalla, Haakon is greeted by Hermóðr and Bragi. Haakon expresses concern that he shall receive Óðinn's hate (Lee Hollander theorizes this may be due to Haakon's conversion to Christianity from his Norse religion), yet Bragi responds that he is welcome:

'All einheriar shall swear oaths to thee:
share thou the Æsir's ale, thou enemy-of-earls!
Here within hast thou brethren eight,' said Bragi.

=== Fagrskinna ===
In chapter 8 of Fagrskinna, a prose narrative states that, after the death of her husband Eric Bloodaxe, Gunnhild Mother of Kings had a poem composed about him. The composition is by an anonymous author from the 10th century and is referred to as Eiríksmál, and describes Eric Bloodaxe and five other kings arriving in Valhalla after their death. The poem begins with comments by Óðinn:

'What kind of a dream is it,' said Óðinn,
'in which just before daybreak,
I thought I cleared Valhǫll,
for coming of slain men?
I waked the Einherjar,
bade valkyries rise up,
to strew the bench,
and scour the beakers,

wine to carry,
as for a king's coming,
here to me I expect
heroes' coming from the world,
certain great ones,
so glad is my heart.'

The god Bragi asks where a thundering sound is coming from, and says that the benches of Valhalla are creaking—as if the god Baldr had returned to Valhalla—and that it sounds like the movement of a thousand. Óðinn responds that Bragi knows well that the sounds are for Eric Bloodaxe, who will soon arrive in Valhalla. Óðinn tells the heroes Sigmund and Sinfjötli to rise to greet Eric and invite him into the hall, if it is indeed he.

Sigmund asks Óðinn why he would expect Eric more than any other king, to which Óðinn responds that Eric has reddened his gore-drenched sword with many other lands. Eric arrives, and Sigmund greets him, tells him that he is welcome to come into the hall, and asks him what other lords he has brought with him to Valhalla. Eric says that with him are five kings, that he will tell them the name of them all, and that he, himself, is the sixth.

== Theories and proposed etymological connections ==
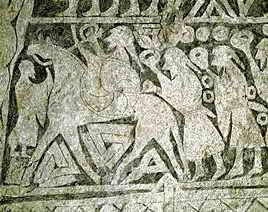
The 8th-century Tängelgårda stone depicts a figure leading a troop of warriors all bearing rings. Valknut symbols appear beneath his horse.

According to John Lindow, Andy Orchard, and Rudolf Simek, scholars have commonly connected the einherjar to the Harii, a Germanic tribe attested by Tacitus in his 1st-century AD work Germania. Tacitus writes:

As for the Harii, quite apart from their strength, which exceeds that of the other tribes I have just listed, they pander to their innate savagery by skill and timing: with black shields and painted bodies, they choose dark nights to fight, and by means of terror and shadow of a ghostly army they cause panic, since no enemy can bear a sight so unexpected and hellish; in every battle the eyes are the first to be conquered.

Lindow says that "many scholars think there may be basis for the myth in an ancient Odin cult, which would be centered on young warriors who entered into an ecstatic relationship with Odin and that the name Harii has been etymologically connected to the -herjar element of einherjar. Simek says that since the connection has become widespread, "one tends to interpret these obviously living armies of the dead as religiously motivated bands of warriors, who led to the formation of the concept of the einherjar as well as the Wild Hunt [...]". Simek continues that the notion of an eternal battle and daily resurrection appears in book I of Saxo Grammaticus' Gesta Danorum and in reports of the eternal battle of Hjaðningavíg.

According to Guðbrandur Vigfússon (1874), the concept of the einherjar links directly to the Old Norse name Einarr. Vigfússon comments that "the name Einarr is properly = einheri", and points to a relation to the term with the Old Norse common nouns einarðr (meaning "bold") and einörð (meaning "valour").

== See also ==
- Fólkvangr, afterlife field of the goddess Freyja
- Fravahr, the innumerable heavenly host of warrior-spirits of the dead in Zoroastrianism
