= The Hidden Oracle =

2016 novel by Rick Riordan

- The cover of the U.S. edition
- Author: Rick Riordan
- Cover artist: John Rocco
- Series: The Trials of Apollo
- Release number: 1
- Genre: Children's fantasy; Action fiction; Adventure fiction; Middle grade fiction; Classical mythology; More genres: Greek mythology; Roman mythology; Children's fiction
- Publisher: Disney-Hyperion
- Publication date: May 3, 2016 (hardcover, audiobook CD, Kindle/Nook eBook)
- Publication place: United States
- Media type: Print (hardback, audiobook CD, e-book)
- Pages: 384 (hardcover)
- ISBN: 978-1-4847-3274-8
- Preceded by: The Blood of Olympus (by release date) (from The Heroes of Olympus); The Chalice of the Gods (chronologically) (from Percy Jackson & the Olympians)
- Followed by: The Dark Prophecy

The Hidden Oracle is a 2016 American children's fantasy action-adventure middle grade children's fiction novel based on Greco-Roman classical mythology written by American author Rick Riordan. It was published on May 3, 2016, and is the first book in The Trials of Apollo series, the second spin-off of the Percy Jackson & the Olympians series. The book and its cover art by John Rocco were first announced in 2015. It has been published in hardcover, audiobook, ebook, and large-print editions. The Hidden Oracle has been translated into 19 languages from its original English.

The book follows the god Apollo, who is turned into a human teenager and thrown down from Olympus to New York City as a punishment by his father, Zeus. Joined by the demigod Meg McCaffrey, Apollo goes to Camp Half-Blood, where he discovers that he will have to regain control of the five oracles of Ancient Greece in order to receive pardon from Zeus.

The novel received positive reviews from critics, who praised Apollo's narration and the book's humor. During its first week of release, The Hidden Oracle sold about 62,000 copies, reaching the top of The New York Times and Publishers Weekly bestseller lists. It won the 2016 Goodreads Choice Award for Middle Grade and Children's Fiction.

== Plot summary ==
After falling into a dumpster in a New York City alley, the god Apollo has only very vague memories of his father, Zeus, punishing him. He learns that he was turned into a human teenager named Lester Papadopoulos. In the alley, two thugs try to mug him, but a young girl named Meg McCaffrey saves him, using fruit to chase the thugs away. Meg claims Apollo's service, binding him to her until he is done with his trials, which he must complete to become a god again. Apollo and Meg go to find Percy Jackson.

With the help of Percy, and his mother, Sally Jackson, Apollo and Meg journey to Camp Half Blood, a camp for demigods. On their way, they get attacked by plague spirits. Meg subconsciously summons a karpos, who defeats the spirits. Meg decides to keep him and names him Peaches, but he only shows up when she's in trouble. After arriving at the Camp, Apollo discovers that the Oracle of Delphi, in the form of Rachel Elizabeth Dare, can no longer issue prophecies; similarly, travel and communication do not work for any of the demigods. The centaur Chiron also mentions that campers have been randomly disappearing into the woods.

At dinner, Meg is attacked by demigods who she previously angered. Peaches comes to her rescue, but the other demigods then attack Peaches, believing him to be dangerous. To save him, Meg reveals that her golden rings can turn into sickles made of Imperial gold. Demeter, the goddess of agriculture, claims her as her daughter.

The next day, Apollo tries to practice music and archery; being imperfect, he swears on the river Styx to never use a bow or a musical instrument until he is a god again. During a "three-legged death race" inside the Labyrinth, Apollo and Meg end up under Delphi in Greece. They overhear Delphi's guard, Python, talking to "the Beast" about how to control all the oracles and destroy the Grove of Dodona. “The Beast” assures Python that he has “well-placed help within the camp.” The encounter terrifies them, especially Meg. They escape the Labyrinth, and Chiron reveals that Apollo's children, Kayla and Austin, disappeared. Chiron and Meg advise Apollo to not search for them and the other missing demigods just yet, much to his anger. Instead, Apollo and Meg keep a lookout for them, and Meg reveals that she knows “the Beast” because of his reputation of taking demigods to train and use as servants. When Meg refused to work for him, he killed her father. Her stepfather then took her in, gave her the swords, and taught her how to fight.

Rachel arrives at the camp. She reveals that a secretive company, Triumvirate Holdings, has conspired against the gods and is attempting to control all the oracles, starting with Dodona, which is located at the camp and has been drawing campers to itself. The next day, Apollo and Meg go searching for the grove, but are attacked by myrmekes. In an attempt to drive them away, Apollo plays music, breaking his oath. The myrmekes kidnap Meg and escape. Apollo tries to return to the camp, but begins to hallucinate; before passing out, he finds Rhea, who gives him wind chimes to put on the largest tree in the Grove of Dodona and teleports him back to camp. Upon awakening, he learns that the leader of Triumvirate Holdings is Emperor Nero.

Apollo returns to the forest and finds the home of the myrmekes, rescuing Meg. They discover the entrance of the grove, along with the missing demigods. Nero appears and reveals that he is now a “god-emperor,” as he found a way to turn himself and the other two emperors in Triumvirate Holdings into gods, using the worshipping they received throughout history. He also reveals that Meg is the “well-placed help,” and he is her stepfather. Meg commands Apollo to help her open the Grove, and he is forced to obey. Nero tries to burn the grove down, but Peaches, sensing Meg's true feelings of guilt and regret, attacks him before he can. Nero and Apollo briefly fight each other, and Meg runs into the Grove. Apollo regains his godly strength for a few seconds, allowing him to defeat his guards. Nero uses Greek fire in a last attempt to destroy the grove. The dryads come to help, consuming the fire to save the grove and sacrificing themselves in the process. Apollo helps Meg put the wind chimes on the largest tree, which gives a prophecy to Apollo. Meg releases him from her service and runs away, insisting that Nero isn't “the Beast” and there's still hope for him. Apollo realizes that she views Nero and “the Beast” as two separate people, a result of Nero's years of mental/emotional abuse.

Nero sends the Colossus Neronis to destroy the camp, but with the help of Percy and the other campers, Apollo defeats the statue by hitting it with a plague-enchanted arrow. The next morning, Leo Valdez and Calypso return to Camp Half-Blood, and the two offer to help Apollo in his quest to rescue the Oracle of Trophonius from Triumvirate Holdings.

=== Characters ===
- Apollo / Lester Papadopoulos: is the main protagonist. One of the Twelve Olympians (he was the god of archery, music, healing, prophecy, poetry and the sun), Apollo was cast down from Olympus and turned into a human named Lester by Zeus after the war against Gaia in The Blood of Olympus. Zeus blames him for encouraging his descendant, the augur Octavian, to follow his dangerous path and for prematurely revealing the Prophecy of Seven. Lester is a narcissistic, 16-year-old, out-of-shape teenager with curly brown hair, blue eyes, ‘flab’, and acne.
- Meg McCaffrey: is a 12-year-old daughter of Demeter. Her father was murdered by "the Beast" and she was subsequently adopted by Emperor Nero, where she was abused and manipulated to believe that they are separate people. She owns a pair of crescent rings which can transform into sickles made of Imperial gold, the Roman sacred metal, as a gift from Nero.
- Peaches: a karpoi (grain spirit) which Meg involuntarily summons after she, Lester, and Percy are attacked by the nosoi, the spirits of disease. He also appears when Meg is in danger.
- Nero: is the main antagonist. He is a legacy of Apollo and a Roman Emperor, infamous for his tyranny and luxury with little regard for his subjects. Alongside the other two Emperors, Nero has influenced many events in history through Triumvirate Holdings, using the company to supply funding for Luke Castellan during Percy Jackson & the Olympians and Octavian and Camp Jupiter during The Heroes of Olympus. Because of his fame, he has always been worshiped throughout history, so he can not die. He refers to himself as a "god-emperor".
- Percy Jackson: one of Apollo's best friends, and helps Apollo in the battle against Nero. Apollo finds Percy Jackson and gets followed by the disease. Percy leaves Apollo later in the book to pursue his own life.

== Composition and marketing ==
In October 2015, during the promotional tour for The Sword of Summer, the first book in the Magnus Chase and the Gods of Asgard series, Rick Riordan announced that he was working on a new series of five books based on Apollo. The first novel was titled The Hidden Oracle and planned to be launched on May 3, 2016.

According to Riordan, he had the idea to make a new series in the universe of Percy Jackson after he wrote Percy Jackson's Greek Gods, when he discovered two myths about Zeus punishing Apollo, turning him into a mortal. Riordan liked the concept and decided to "subject poor Apollo to that punishment for a third time and write a series from his point of view as a newly outcast 16-year-old mortal". However, he promised that many of the characters from Percy Jackson & the Olympians and The Heroes of Olympus would return in the new series. Because Apollo is the god of poetry, the name of each chapter would be a "bad haiku".

The cover, illustrated by John Rocco, was revealed on October 10, 2015; it shows the two versions of Apollo in an alley of New York City. Two months later, on December 10, the third chapter was made available for free download by USA Today. The first chapter was released along with the collection of short stories Demigods & Magicians on April 5, 2016. In addition, three trailers were released on YouTube to promote the book. A launch event occurred at the Harvard Book Store on the day of publication.

== Release ==
The Hidden Oracle was released in the United States by Disney-Hyperion on May 3, 2016. An audiobook, narrated by Robbie Daymond, was published on the same date by Books on Tape. On May 4, Thorndike Press published a large-print edition in hardcover. The book also received e-book and paperback versions, and has been translated into 19 languages.

For the first printing, Disney-Hyperion offered different gifts that varied according to where the book was purchased: a letter from Apollo to Zeus at Barnes & Noble, an illustrated map of Apollo's trials at Camp Half-Blood at Target, a bumper sticker of Apollo at Books-a-Million, two-sided bookmarks with the divine and mortal versions of Apollo at Walmart, and an illustrated poster depicting the "plague of secrets" at Costco.

The Hidden Oracle sold over 62,000 copies during the first week. Upon release, the book ranked No. 1 on The New York Times bestseller list and Publishers Weekly's bestseller list, remaining on the latter for 32 weeks. It placed No. 2 on USA Today's bestseller list and Amazon's bestseller list.

The book's lexile score is 680L, making it appropriate for readers aged 11 to 13. Most reviewers label it appropriate material for grades 5–8, although some also include grades as low as 3 and as high as 12.

== Reception ==
The novel received positive reviews. Many highlighted the novel as an enjoyable continuation of Riordan's previous work. April Spisak, wrote in The Bulletin of the Center for Children's Books that "Riordan fans will find all of the key elements here: wisecracking narration, underdog kid turned hero... mythological core, and robust side characters" In the same way, The Guardian highlighted Riordan's ability to "inject humor, even during sad moments" into his writing. Sarah Hunter of Booklist praised the way Riordan mixed comedic elements with "Greek myths throughout the story [which] adds some emotional depth to his often vainglorious lead."

The book's narration by the god Apollo was also praised, described as a major change from earlier books. Karen Rought of Hypable lauded Riordan's presentation of the story through a god rather than his usual perspective of a demigod, commenting: "seeing Percy Jackson from a former god's point of view is both hilarious and enchanting". Kirkus praised this narration, noting Apollo's bragging about his own "godly virtues (including his open bisexuality) and [his] gripes about his current awkwardness and servitude to Meg". Aditi Saha of The Times of India regards Apollo as Riordan's best character whose "love for poems, sarcasm, and selfishness will make any readers fall for his unusual charm". She also praised the "portrait of Greek mythology complete with a well-developed world", but criticized the lack of introduction to the old characters. Similarly, Carrie R. Wheadon of Common Sense Media commented positively on the narration, but unlike Saha, felt that due to "balance between mythological monster battles and character growth, humor, and pathos, this start to a spin-off of a spin-off series doesn't disappoint longtime Riordan fans".

Reviewers have expressed appreciation for other differences from Riordan's previous works as well. Writing for the School Library Journal, Beth L. Meister highlighted the diversity of the characters, especially with Apollo openly discussing his bisexuality. According to Katherine Szabo of Kidsreads, the inclusion of racially diverse and LGBT characters was "the forefront of the story". She also called the fact that the book was shorter than its predecessors "very refreshing".

The audiobook was also well received. Publishers Weekly commented that "Robbie Daymond’s narration is delightful: lively and comical, he perfectly captures the lovably conceited and pompous Apollo". The AudioFile review also praised Daymond's performance, saying that "Riordan's funny writing and Daymond's narration make sure the listener is always on Apollo's side as he learns how to manage without his godly gifts." The Hidden Oracle won the Goodreads Choice Award for the Middle Grade and Children's Fiction of 2016.

== Sequel ==
The second book of The Trials of Apollo is titled The Dark Prophecy and was announced by Riordan on May 5, 2016. The cover and the first chapter were released on December 22, 2016. The Dark Prophecy was released on May 2, 2017, and sold 63,000 copies in the first week. The third book, The Burning Maze was published on May 1, 2018. The fourth book, The Tyrant's Tomb was published on September 24, 2019. The fifth book, The Tower of Nero was released on October 6, 2020.
