= The Burning Maze =

2018 novel by Rick Riordan

- U.S. cover of first edition.
- Author: Rick Riordan
- Cover artist: John Rocco
- Series: The Trials of Apollo
- Release number: 3
- Genre: Children's fantasy; Action fiction; Adventure fiction; Middle grade fiction; Classical mythology; More genres: Greek mythology; Roman mythology; Children's fiction
- Publisher: Disney Hyperion
- Publication date: May 1, 2018
- Publication place: United States
- Media type: Print (hardcover and paperback), audiobook, e-book
- Pages: 448 (hardcover)
- ISBN: 978-1-4847-4643-1
- Preceded by: The Dark Prophecy
- Followed by: The Tyrant's Tomb

The Burning Maze is a 2018 American children's fantasy action-adventure middle grade children's fiction novel based on Greco-Roman classical mythology written by American author Rick Riordan. It was published on May 1, 2018, and is the third book in The Trials of Apollo series, the second spin-off of the Percy Jackson & the Olympians series.

The story follows the Greek god Apollo, who has been turned into a human teenager named Lester Papadopoulos, in his quest to free five oracles of Ancient Greece from Triumvirate Holdings, a group of three evil Roman Emperors, in order to regain his immortality. Joined by the demigod Meg McCaffrey and the satyr Grover Underwood, Apollo goes to the Labyrinth in search of the Oracle of Erythraea, the next Oracle to be rescued.

The novel was published in hardcover, audiobook, ebook, and large-print editions, and the cover was illustrated by John Rocco. The Burning Maze received positive reviews from critics, who praised Apollo's narration and the book's humor. It was a bestseller on Amazon.

== Plot summary ==
The story begins a few days after the events of the previous book, "The Dark Prophecy". Apollo, in the body of the 16-year-old Lester Papadopoulos, ventures through the Labyrinth with 12-year-old Meg McCaffrey and the satyr, Grover Underwood in a bid to find the third emperor of the Triumvirate Holdings. As the trio face a continuous attack of Strix, Grover unleashes the cry of Pan, the lost god of the wild, and brings them to Aeithales, which is later revealed to be Meg's former home, in Palm Springs, California. Mellie, the wife of the satyr Gleeson Hedge, asks Apollo and Grover to go and check up on Hedge, who is in an army surplus store nearby. The duo goes there, only to face Naevius Sutorius Macro. They escape, when seemingly, a horse, comes and contacts somebody. They head back, and Apollo reveals that the horse is Incitatus, and the third emperor is Caligula, the most feared and bloodthirsty Roman emperor, famous for his murderous reign and insanity.

Mellie reveals that Jason Grace and Piper McLean had gone into the Labyrinth. Apollo and Meg pick up Piper, who is moving away to Tahlequah, Oklahoma, and Jason, who is at school and occasionally has fights with monsters disguised as teachers. Jason secretly tells Apollo that he had met with Herophile, the sibyl inside the Labyrinth, who told him that when the next time the duo comes, one of them will die. Fearing Piper's demise, Jason keeps this to himself.

Apollo, Meg, Jason, and Piper sneak into Caligula's ship to steal his shoes, which are a priority according to the Dark Prophecy. All of them are captured by Pandai, loyal servants to Caligula. They escape with the help of Crest, a young Pandai, and Apollo finds the shoes, but then they are captured by Incitatus the right-hand horse of Caligula. Jason engages Caligula in a one-sided battle to buy time, only to be stabbed twice by Caligula's spear and kicked by Incitatus. Jason calls his venti (air spirit) before dying, helping the others escape. Upon reaching Piper's home in Malibu, Piper angrily blames Apollo as the reason for Jason's death. Caligula meanwhile sails North to Camp Jupiter.

Apollo, Meg, Grover, and Crest enter the Labyrinth and are faced with riddles that seemingly lead to Herophile's prison. However, Apollo panics and gives the wrong answer to one of them. Facing certain death, Apollo decides to find the cause of the flames that have been engulfing the southern lands for a long time and discovers the faded but still burning body of Helios, the former titan of the sun being used by Medea in order to make Caligula the new sun god, and Apollo promises to exact revenge for Helios.

The trio reaches Herophile and is faced with another prophecy that Apollo dreads. They get out with the help of Meliai, ash-tree spirits Meg had earlier planted. They kill Medea and Incitatus but Crest also gets killed in the process. Apollo and Meg entrust Aeithales' safety with the Meliai and continue their journeys. Jason's body is given to Apollo for burial at Camp Jupiter, and Leo takes Hedge, Mellie, and Piper to Oklahoma.

== Characters ==
- Apollo / Lester Papadopoulos – one of the Twelve Olympians, Apollo was cast down from Olympus and turned into a human named Lester by Zeus after the war against Gaea in The Blood of Olympus. Like Lester, he has to free the five Oracles that have gone dark, the Sibyl Herophile being one of them. Caligula requires his essence (along with that of Helios) to make himself a sun god.
- Meg McCaffrey – a 12-year-old daughter of Demeter.
- Grover Underwood – Satyr, Lord of the Wild.
- Piper McLean – Daughter of Aphrodite with the rare gift of charm speak.
- Jason Grace – The demigod son of Jupiter, the Roman aspect of Zeus.
- Caligula – The main antagonist. He is a legacy of Apollo and a Roman Emperor, infamous for his tyranny and insanity. Alongside Nero and Commodus, Caligula has influenced many events in history through Triumvirate Holdings.
- Medea: A Roman sorceress who decides to help Caligula to become the new sun god.

== Release ==
The Burning Maze was first published by Disney-Hyperion as a hardcover in the United States on May 1, 2018, with cover illustration by John Rocco. Ebook and audiobook editions were released the same day. The audiobook is read by actor Robbie Daymond and published by Listening Library.

The Burning Maze had a first printing of about two million copies. It sold more than 52,000 copies during the first week. Upon release, the book debuted at No. 1 on the Publishers Weekly Children's Frontlist Fiction bestseller list and No. 3 on the overall list (remaining there for 2 weeks). The hardcover edition debuted at No. 1 on Amazon's Teen & Young Adult Greek & Roman Myths & Legends bestseller list and the Kindle ebook at No. 1 on the Teen & Young Adult Sword & Sorcery Fantasy eBooks list. The next week, the book was the 6th sold among fiction novels on Amazon. It debuted at No. 5 on the USA Today bestseller list. On The Wall Street Journal fiction bestseller list, the book debuted at No. 2. In the first week of release, The Trials of Apollo series was No. 2 on The New York Times bestseller list.

In the United Kingdom and other Commonwealth nations, English-language editions in hardcover were also released May 1 by Puffin Books with cover art by Ben Hughes. The Puffin edition also included a Percy Jackson short story. Although many non-English editions used John Rocco's cover art, a few have unique covers by other illustrators. Additionally, Barnes & Noble released a special edition exclusive to its customers, which also included a removable puzzle collection. Another edition was also released, which included Riordan's autograph, a frontispiece, endpapers, and slipcase.

The book is recommended for 12-14-year-olds on Disney's website.

== Sequel ==
The sequel, The Tyrant's Tomb, was released on September 24, 2019.

The fifth book in the series, The Tower of Nero, was released in 2020.
