= The Tower of Nero =

2020 novel by Rick Riordan

- U.S. cover of first edition
- Author: Rick Riordan
- Cover artist: John Rocco
- Series: The Trials of Apollo
- Release number: 5
- Genre: Children's fantasy; Action fiction; Adventure fiction; Middle grade fiction; Classical mythology; More genres: Greek mythology; Roman mythology; Children's fiction
- Publisher: Disney Hyperion
- Publication date: October 6, 2020
- Publication place: United States
- Media type: Print (hardcover and paperback), audiobook, e-book
- Pages: 416 (hardcover)
- ISBN: 978-1-4847-4645-5
- Preceded by: The Tyrant's Tomb
- Followed by: The Sun and the Star (from The Nico di Angelo Adventures)

The Tower of Nero is a 2020 American children's fantasy action-adventure middle grade children's fiction novel based on Greco-Roman classical mythology by American author Rick Riordan. It was first published on October 6, 2020, and is the fifth and final book in The Trials of Apollo series, the second spin-off of the Percy Jackson & the Olympians series, as well as the final book in the mainline Camp Half-Blood Chronicles.

In the book, Apollo (in his human form, Lester Papadopoulos) and his demigod master, Meg, fight to free the last oracle. They must face their final enemies, Meg's abusive stepfather Nero and Apollo's longtime nemesis Python. The book begins with the revelation of Triumvirate Holdings, a powerful and malevolent entity led by Nero also with the Roman emperors Commodus and Julius Caesar. In the book, Apollo refers to him as Caligula (Caesar's childhood nickname). The group threatens to unleash chaos and destruction upon the world by releasing the ancient and deadly Python.

The story is told in the first-person point of view, by Apollo.

The novel was published in hardcover, audiobook, ebook, and, large-print editions and the cover was illustrated by John Rocco.

== Plot ==
After fainting due to exhaustion on arrival, Apollo has a dream in which he sees Lu telling Nero about their escape. Nero gives an ultimatum to Meg and Apollo to surrender within two days or else Manhattan will burn. The next day, Apollo, Meg, Apollo's son Will Solace, and Will's boyfriend Nico di Angelo go to meet Rachel Dare, the Delphic oracle's Pythia. She warns them about some cattle that are standing outside. After they discuss a way to sabotage Nero's Greek fire vats with the help of the troglodytes, a species of good diggers, Rachel suddenly spouts the final couplet of the prophecy, but Python has meddled with it. The cattle, revealed to be the Tauri Silvestres, attack, and the five manage to escape. Nico helps them reach the troglodytes via shadow travel, and Will is revealed to have the power to glow in the dark.

However, Nero doesn't believe Apollo's supposed surrender, and had discovered Lu was working with Apollo and Meg. Nero punishes Lu by having Cassius, a demigod in Nero's Imperial Household, use Meg's scimitars to amputate Lu's hands. Then, both Lu and Apollo are thrown into a holding cell.

Apollo, after managing to revive Lu, finds out that a leontocephaline, a creation of the Persian god Mithras, is guarding the fasces. As a guardian of immortality, he requires a sacrifice of it in return for granting access to the fasces. Lu and Apollo escape the prison, and Lu decides to give up her immortality to get the fasces, while Apollo goes to save Meg.

Upstairs, he realizes that the entire lower floor area has become a battleground, Camp Half-Blood demigods having come in. Kayla and Austin, two of his children, help Apollo reach Meg. On the way, Lester enters the wrong room, one containing the buttons to burn up Manhattan; the button is pressed, but nothing happens, as the vats have been disabled.

After some searching, Apollo runs past a laptop. Nero video calls the laptop and tells him that he has a plan B: to release Sassanid gas, which is extremely poisonous, and kill everyone in the building, unless Apollo comes to the throne room in fifteen minutes. Apollo tells the troglodytes about the gas trap, and they run to disable it.

Nero finally finds the correct remote and presses the button. Suddenly, Will, Rachel, and Lu show up, along with the troglodyte leader and the emperor's fasces. To Nero's disbelief, the troglodytes have also been successful in disabling the gas trap. Nero is forced to reveal the truth, that he is not that powerful, and is being used as a pawn by Python. If Nero is killed, then Python would become nearly impossible to kill, as the entire Triumvirate's power would go to him. Nero is given a choice, to fight a hopeless battle and die, or live for some more years in a large prison. He chooses the first option, but gets into a tug of war with Apollo over the fasces, which Apollo was trying to break. Lester manages to use his godly powers to revoke Nero's divinity and immortality, and breaks the fasces, killing Nero.

Camp Half-Blood's forces stay at the Tower to help rehabilitate the Imperial children after the years of abuse they endured, but Apollo has to go defeat Python. Using the Labyrinth, he reaches Delphi in minutes.

Apollo faces off against Python for the final time. He is quickly overpowered by the giant snake, who utters a prophecy saying Apollo will fall, and Apollo lose his bow. The arrow of Dodona sacrifices itself to defeat Python and finishes Python's prophecy, saying that Apollo will fall, but must also rise again. Apollo manages to blind Python and make him loosen his hold by hitting Python in the eyes with the Arrow of Dodona as well as his elbow. He drags Python into Tartarus with him, fulfilling Python's prophecy in a literal sense.

The two almost fall down into Chaos but are saved by a ledge. Apollo is attacked by Python, but manages to throw him off the ledge into Chaos, destroying him forever and freeing the oracles from his power. Apollo is left dangling on the edge, when the goddess of the Styx, who has been following him since he broke his oath on the Styx in the first book, congratulates him on learning his lesson, to always uphold a promise. Apollo becomes a god again, and, two weeks later, reappears on Mount Olympus, where he is welcomed back as an Olympian.

After Apollo is greeted by the other Olympians, and after checking on the condition of the Sun chariot, he splits himself into multiple Apollos and goes to find his friends. He visits Camp Half-Blood, where Nico and Will tell him that Nico has been hearing a voice from Tartarus lately that he suspects is his old friend Iapetus the Titan, known as Bob ever since Percy doused him in the River Lethe, who seemed to have died helping Percy and Annabeth escape Tartarus in The House of Hades. With the help of the troglodytes, Nico and Will intend to travel to Tartarus to find the source of the voice and rescue Bob if they can, and Rachel delivers a prophecy about this prospective quest. Apollo visits Camp Jupiter, where Frank and Hazel are praetors. Hazel had got rid of the curse on her summoned jewels so they can now be spent, and Percy and Annabeth have begun attending university there. Percy studies marine biology and Annabeth architecture. He visits the Indianapolis Union Station, where Georgina is being taught by Jo how to forge blades. Reyna is there with the other Hunters of Artemis to hunt down the Teumessian Fox, as well as Leo, since Calypso is now in high school and had gone to a summer camp as a counselor. Apollo visits Piper in Oklahoma, where she has started a new life with her father and her new girlfriend Shel. Apollo also visits Meg, who is living in Palm Springs with Lu, the Imperial children whom she is teaching to garden, and the Meliae who are acting as security guards.

== Release ==
The Tower of Nero was first published by Disney-Hyperion as a hardcover in the United States on September 24, 2019, with cover illustration by John Rocco. Ebook and audiobook editions were released the same day. The audiobook is read by actor Robbie Daymond and published by Listening Library.

On February 14, 2020, Hypable.com published the first two chapters of The Tower of Nero. They also included the cover and an excerpt from the book.

Although many non-English editions used John Rocco's cover art, a few have unique covers by other illustrators.

The Barnes & Noble edition of The Tower of Nero includes a poster called "Apollo's Monster Menagerie" that shows all the monsters that appear in the book.

The book is recommended for ages 10–14.

== Future ==
The Tower of Nero is the last book in the Camp Half Blood Chronicles. Riordan has no plans to write another five book series, but there will be spin-off books, like The Sun and the Star, The Chalice of the Gods and Wrath of the Triple Goddess
