= The Tyrant's Tomb =

2019 novel by Rick Riordan

- U.S. cover of first edition.
- Author: Rick Riordan
- Cover artist: John Rocco
- Series: The Trials of Apollo
- Release number: 4
- Genre: Children's fantasy; Action fiction; Adventure fiction; Middle grade fiction; Classical mythology; More genres: Greek mythology; Roman mythology; Children's fiction
- Publisher: Disney Hyperion
- Publication date: September 24, 2019
- Publication place: United States
- Media type: Print (hardcover and paperback), audiobook, e-book
- Pages: 448 (hardcover)
- ISBN: 978-1-4847-4644-8
- Preceded by: The Burning Maze
- Followed by: The Tower of Nero

The Tyrant's Tomb is a 2019 American children's fantasy action-adventure middle grade children's fiction novel based on Greco-Roman classical mythology written by American author Rick Riordan. It was first published on September 24, 2019, and is the fourth book in The Trials of Apollo series, the second spin-off of the Percy Jackson & the Olympians series.

The story follows the Greek god Apollo in the form of Lester Papadopoulos traveling to Camp Jupiter, where he must learn what it is to be a hero or die trying. The book follows Apollo on his path to restoring five ancient oracles and regaining his godly powers.

The novel was published in hardcover, audiobook, ebook, and, large-print editions and the cover was illustrated by John Rocco.

== Plot summary ==
The story starts off with Apollo and Meg taking Jason's body to Camp Jupiter in the San Francisco Bay Area. On their way, they are attacked by an eurynomos, but a girl with pink hair arrives with dryads and a faun and kills the euronymous. She introduces herself as Lavinia and says she will take them to Camp Jupiter. All the dryads and fauns start to leave, but as the last faun, Don, tries to go, Lavinia says that he owes her for helping him. They carry Jason's coffin to the tunnel where Lavinia knows there is a shortcut to Camp Jupiter.

Hazel Levesque suddenly arrives, as well as two more of the euronymous. They enter the tunnel while Hazel tries to kill the euronymous. Apollo tries to sing a song to help Hazel but is scratched in the stomach by a euronymous before Hazel kills it. Due to the scratch, Apollo starts to turn into a corpse. Hazel sees Jason's coffin and is terrified because she had a dream about Jason being killed by Caligula. The five arrive at Camp Jupiter, where they are greeted by Frank Zhang and Reyna Ramírez-Arellano, the praetors. The camp decides they will all carry on with Jason's plan to build temples honoring the gods.

Apollo then faints and has a dream about Caligula and Commodus discussing their plan to either take Camp Jupiter without conflict or destroy it using Greek fire from Caligula's yachts. Apollo wakes up in a bed and Meg explains that he has been asleep for a day and a half. There is a funeral for Jason that night, and Lupa shows up to tell Apollo to get divine help to defeat their enemies. Apollo and Frank go to Ella the harpy and Tyson the Cyclops, who are recreating the Sibylline Books. They get a prophecy regarding Tarquin's tomb. They go to the camp senate, where he, Meg, Lavinia, and Hazel are selected to go on a mission to find out more about Tarquin, the final king of Rome, who has returned. They discover that Tarquin has kept a "soundless god" at Sutro Tower. After they return, they realize that to solve the communication issues and get divine help, they need to destroy the soundless god. A quest is issued for Apollo, Meg, and Hazel to go to Sutro Tower.

At the tower, they realize the god is Harpocrates, who has had troubles with Apollo. He also has a jar containing the voice of the Sibyl of Cumae. With some difficulty, they manage to get the last breath of Harpocrates, along with Sibyl's Jar, which is required to get divine help. On their way back, they are ambushed by a euronymous again, and after they kill him, they are helped by Lavinia and her friends, who escaped from the camp earlier. Reyna and Lavinia issue "Plan L" to defeat the yachts that Apollo saw in his dream. When Apollo and Meg return, they see the camp in the midst of a war. Apollo calls for divine help on Temple Hill. He decides to call Diana. Frank sacrifices himself by burning his firewood lifeline in the process of killing Caligula to save the other legionnaires. Commodus gives the order to fire, but due to "Plan L", this fails and the yachts are destroyed. Apollo kills Commodus in the grief of losing Frank. Meanwhile, Tarquin has reached the bookshop where the Sibylline Books are being rewritten, but Ella and Tyson are not there. Meg and Hazel fight Tarquin. Diana finally arrives, kills Tarquin, and heals Apollo. Reyna and Lavinia, along with Peaches the karpos, return. Arion, Hazel's horse, rescues Frank, who has mysteriously survived, and Reyna pledges herself to Diana (Artemis) and joins the Hunters. Dakota, son of Bacchus and the longtime centurion of the Fifth Cohort, passes away overnight due to wounds from the battle. Don the faun also dies and gets reincarnated into a laurel tree, Apollo's tree of victory. Hazel is voted new praetor of Camp Jupiter and Lavinia is voted in as centurion of the Fifth Cohort.

Apollo receives his old godly bow as a gift from Camp Jupiter, Meg receives seeds, and they set off to New York after receiving the final prophecy from Ella and Tyson; they realize it is in terza rima form and they have to find more stanzas in the east. They go in hopes of being reunited with their friends from Camp Half-Blood.

== Development ==
In an interview, Rick Riordan stated that the book will have Camp Jupiter, Hazel Levesque, Frank Zhang, and Reyna Ramírez-Arellano. Editor Stephanie Lurie has confirmed that the Arrow of Dodona will appear in the book. On May 16, Rick Riordan revealed that he finished writing the book on April 1. However, due to the preparation, printing, promotion, and distribution of the book, it will not be released until September 24.

Read Riordan released a video of Rick Riordan previewing the book. He revealed that Camp Jupiter was having a big "shake up" in the power structure.

== Release ==
The Tyrant's Tomb was first published by Disney-Hyperion as a hardcover in the United States on September 24, 2019, with cover illustration by John Rocco. Ebook and audiobook editions were released the same day. The audiobook is read by actor Robbie Daymond and published by Listening Library.

According to Scholastic Press, The Tyrant's Tomb has sold nearly 86 million copies.

According to Publishers Weekly, The Tyrant's Tomb reached its highest rank of 1 on November 18, 2019. It was also listed as a 2019 children's bestseller.

The Barnes & Noble edition of the book was announced to contain exclusive content such as a full poster of one of the scenes in the book as well as diary entries by a female Camp Jupiter "probatio" who investigates an ancient Roman mystery.

Although many non-English editions used John Rocco's cover art, a few have unique covers by other illustrators.

On March 7, 2019, the cover and first two chapters of the book were released.

The book is recommended for ages 9–12.

== Sequel ==
The fifth and the last book in the series, The Tower of Nero, was released on October 6, 2020
