= The Dark Prophecy =

2017 fantasy novel by Rick Riordan

- U.S. cover for first edition
- Author: Rick Riordan
- Cover artist: John Rocco
- Series: The Trials of Apollo
- Release number: 2
- Genre: Children's fantasy; Action fiction; Adventure fiction; Middle grade fiction; Classical mythology; More genres: Greek mythology; Roman mythology; Children's fiction
- Publisher: Disney-Hyperion
- Publication date: May 2, 2017 (hardcover, audiobook CD, Kindle/Nook eBook)
- Publication place: United States
- Media type: Print (hardback, paperback, audiobook CD, e-book)
- Pages: 432 (hardcover)
- ISBN: 978-1-4847-4642-4
- Preceded by: The Hidden Oracle
- Followed by: The Burning Maze

The Dark Prophecy is 2017 American children's fantasy action-adventure middle grade children's fiction novel based on Greco-Roman classical mythology written by American author Rick Riordan. It was published on May 2, 2017, and is the second book in The Trials of Apollo series, the second spin-off of the Percy Jackson & the Olympians series. The book and its cover art by John Rocco were first announced in 2016. It has been published in hardcover, paperback, audiobook, ebook, and large-print editions. The Dark Prophecy has been translated into seven languages from its original English.

The book takes off from where The Hidden Oracle ended, wherein Apollo continues his search as a human teenager to restore the Oracles of Ancient Greece that have gone dark in order to regain his immortality. Along with Meg McCaffrey, he journeys to the Oracle of Trophonius in Indianapolis and later settles his personal feud with Commodus, the second Emperor of the Triumvirate Holdings.

The novel received positive reviews from critics for its slow pace, humor, and diverse characters. During its first week of release, The Dark Prophecy sold about 63,000 copies, reaching the top of The New York Times and Publishers Weekly bestseller lists.

== Plot summary ==
Six weeks after losing Meg McCaffrey to Nero and receiving the first prophecy, Apollo, Leo, Festus and Calypso are headed on a journey to stop Nero, the Beast, from controlling all of the oracles. They are rescued from a group of attacking blemmyae by Hemithea and invited into the Waystation, in the Indianapolis Union Station, where Apollo recalls answering to Hemithea's prayer back when she was a Greek princess and turning Hemithea into a goddess, only to have his gift rejected when she joined the Hunters of Artemis. He learns that she is in a relationship with Josephine and the two of them have sacrificed their immortality as Hunters for love and are living as mortals. Their adopted daughter Georgina went missing after searching for the Oracle of Trophonius to receive a prophecy to prevent the Emperor Commodus from taking their griffins. Instead, she receives a message that damages her mind and causes her to wander away. Britomartis, the goddess of nets and owner of the Waystation, issues Apollo and Calypso a quest to rescue the griffins stolen by Commodus. The duo manages to rescue the griffins but is cornered by Lityerses, Commodus' man and the son of King Midas who holds a grudge against Leo for his role in Midas' second death and Lityerses getting turned into a golden statue. Meg McCaffrey arrives just in time and duels with Lityerses until Apollo releases the rest of the caged animals. Apollo then picks up Meg on his griffin while Lityerses is trampled, and the three go to the Waystation.

Apollo, Leo, and Meg head to Commodus's lair and free all the captured animals and prisoners, including Georgina. They search for the Throne of Memory and find it, but they are discovered by Commodus. They manage to escape with the help of Festus and the Huntresses of Artemis and rescue Lit, who was to be executed. They take everyone back to the Waystation, where Georgina relays a recorded message instead of a prophecy by Trophonius, who is revealed to be Apollo's son. He refers to Georgina as a sister, leading everyone to believe she is Apollo's daughter. Apollo and Meg decide to travel to the Oracle for the prophecy, while the rest defend the Waystation. At the Oracle, Apollo drinks from both the River of Memory and of Forgetfulness to prepare himself for taking the prophecy, but which also makes him lose his sanity for the time being. Meg sings a song of her sorrows which jogs Apollo back to reality and awakens the spirit of Trophonius. Apollo pleads with Trophonius to take him instead of Meg, to which Trophonius agrees in return for a wish, but gives her the prophecy anyway.

Apollo performs CPR on Meg and destroys the Oracle, fulfilling Trophonius's wish. Peaches the karpoi and his friends drive them to the Waystation in time for battle. Apollo finds Commodus fighting Josephine, Calypso, Lit, and Thalia while holding Leo, Hemithea, and Georgina hostage. Apollo feels a surge of godly strength inside him and warns Commodus to stand down. Commodus does not pay heed to Apollo's words. Apollo manages to reveal his true divine form, blinding Commodus and his men who are forced to flee. Meg reveals a prophecy in the form of a Shakespearan sonnet, which tells them that they must warn Camp Jupiter of an attack in five days and will have to travel in the Labyrinth with the assistance of a satyr. Meg summons the closest satyr using her powers, who turns out to be Grover Underwood.

=== Characters ===
There once was a god named Apollo
Who plunged in a cave, blue and hollow
Upon a three seater
The bronze fire eater
Was forced death and madness to swallow

— Prophecy given to Apollo and Meg by the Grove of Dodona in The Hidden Oracle, which refers to the events of The Dark Prophecy.
- Apollo / Lester Papadopoulos: The main protagonist. Apollo continues freeing the other Oracles that have gone dark. He journeys to the Oracle of Trophonius to receive the next prophecy.
- Leo Valdez: Demigod son of Hephaestus. After returning to life in The Blood of Olympus, Leo and his girlfriend Calypso act as companions in aiding Apollo.
- Calypso: Daughter of the Titan Atlas. She was freed from her prison in Ogygia by Leo and currently assists Apollo in his trials. She was thought to have lost her magic powers after leaving Ogygia but surprisingly, still retains them. According to the goddess Briomartis, Calypso simply lost control over her magic and the goddess and the residents of the Waystation help her to regain control.
- Meg McCaffrey: 12-year-old daughter of Demeter. She assists Apollo in seeking out the Oracle of Trophonius.
- Commodus: Commodus is the second and weakest Emperor in the Triumvirate. As a Roman Emperor, he was loved by Apollo and met his death at the hands of the same and now wishes to take his revenge.
- Festus: A celestial bronze automaton. After being repaired by Leo Valdez in The Blood of Olympus, the fire breathing dragon provides as an escort on their quest.
- Lityerses: The demigod son of King Midas and Demeter who is also known as the Reaper of Men or simply just Lit. In The Lost Hero, Lit was resurrected by Gaea through the Doors of Death along with his father King Midas, but he was turned into a golden statue by Jason Grace. Free once again, Lit serves as one of Commodus' lieutenants and seeks revenge upon Leo for his role in Midas' second death and Lit's imprisonment. Lit later defects to the side of Apollo, helping to defend the Waystation and defeat Commodus' attack force.

== Composition and marketing ==
The Dark Prophecy was announced on Rick Riordan's website on May 5, 2016, two days after the release of The Hidden Oracle.

The cover, illustrated by John Rocco, was revealed on December 22, 2016; featuring Apollo along with battle ostriches and a pair of gryphons. The first chapter was released as an excerpt along with the cover on the same day by USA Today. In addition, a trailer was released on YouTube to promote the book. In March, Riordan interacted with fans and signed about 1700 copies of the book.

== Release ==
The Dark Prophecy was released in the United States by Disney-Hyperion on May 2, 2017. An audiobook, narrated by Robbie Daymond, was published on the same date by Books on Tape. The book was also released in e-book and paperback format. For the first printing, Disney-Hyperion offered different gifts that varied according to where the book was purchased: A Trials of Apollo pen and a pocket journal at Hypable, and Camp Half-Blood sunglasses and The Trials of Apollo beach mat at The Young Folks. The first printing of The Dark Prophecy was 2 million copies in the United States.

In the United Kingdom and Australia, English-language editions in hardcover, paperback, ebook and audiobook were also released on May 2 by Puffin Books. To date, editions have been released in Spanish, Italian, Polish, Portuguese, Bulgarian, Dutch, French, Czech, Turkish, Norwegian, Albanian, Hebrew, Catalan and Vietnamese. Although many non-English editions used John Rocco's cover art made for the U.S. edition, a few – and the Puffin editions – have unique covers by other illustrators.

The Dark Prophecy sold 62,987 copies in the U.S. and 6,419 in the UK during the first week. It was the most-purchased novel in the United States during the first week of May, outperforming second place (Neil deGrasse Tyson's Astrophysics for People in a Hurry) by almost 15,000 units. Upon release, the book ranked No. 1 on The New York Times bestseller list and Publishers Weekly's bestseller list. It remained on the latter for 23 weeks. The novel also placed on USA Today's bestseller list. It opened at No. 11 on the iBooks bestseller list, but dropped to 18th place a week later and further to 20th after another week.

As of February 2018, the book has sold more than 252,000 copies in hardcover format alone.

The book received a Lexile score of 700L, making it age- and difficulty-appropriate for the average 11-13 year-old. On Scholastic, the book is recommended to teachers as appropriate material for grades 3-5, 6-8 and 9-12. A reviewer for Common Sense Media rated the book as 10+, while another reviewer wrote that the book was better suited for a younger audience, comprising 8 to 20 year olds, claiming that older readers would find it hard to believe the exaggerated drama.

== Reception ==
The novel received positive reviews, but overall much less attention than the first in the series. Preeja Aravind of The Free Press Journal opined that the book appeals to Riordan's already established fantasy, with the old characters showing development. While stating the book is a standalone, Aravind recommends reading the predecessor first. Gillian P. of Pikes Peak Library District's Teen Team felt otherwise, rating the book 5/5 and called it "every bit as good as the first book", highly recommending it to fans of Percy Jackson & the Olympians and The Heroes of Olympus.

One topic frequently noted in by critics is the characters and their development. Carrie R. Wheadon of Common Sense Media praises the addition of characters such as the ex-immortal couple Emmie and Jo as a way to increase depth. She notes that this novel is more an exploration of other characters and their relationships to Apollo than it is about the god himself. Karen Rought of Hypable states that the author's continued introduction of diverse characters feels completely natural and is never forced, writing it "feels like a truer snapshot of the world than most books ever attempt to display". She finds the relationship between Apollo and Calypso particularly interesting. Pamela Kramer, former National Book Reviewer for Examiner.com, praised the characterization of Apollo as well, calling him "the brightest sun of all." She appreciated Riordan's choice to make the god bisexual. However, not all reviewers thought this character development benefitted the novel.

Reviewers were divided on the subject of the novel's quick pacing. Wheadon of Common Sense Media criticizes the fast-paced action, stating that it causes the reader to forget important details. In contrast, The Times of India compliments the pacing and writes that it gives the reader time to stop and think about the contrast between immortality and a meaningful life.

Hypable's review praises how Riordan manages instill humor even in tough situations. Writing for Young Adult Books Central, Karen Yingling agrees. She rates the book 5/5, appreciating how the descriptions of random facts not important to the plot adds humor. She also appreciates "his inclusion of very obscure mythological characters, and the way that he manages to work their mythological story into his own."

The AudioFile magazine lauded the audiobook narration, writing, "Narrator Robbie Daymond is perfectly tuned in as events take a darker turn in this sequel to The Hidden Oracle.... There's plenty of adventure and humor here, and listeners will finish this installment already eager for the next one".

The novel was nominated for Best Middle Grade & Children's Book of 2017 in the Goodreads Choice Awards, and ended in second place, behind The Ship of the Dead, also written by Riordan.

== Sequel ==
The third book of The Trials of Apollo is titled The Burning Maze and was announced by Riordan on October 17, 2017. It released on May 1, 2018.
