= Daughter of the Deep =

2021 middle grade novel by Rick Riordan

- The cover of the U.S. edition
- Author: Rick Riordan
- Cover artist: Lavanya Naidu
- Genre: Fantasy, science fiction, young adult novel
- Published: October 5, 2021
- Publisher: Disney Press
- Publication place: United States
- Media type: Print (hardcover and paperback), audiobook, e-book
- Pages: 416
- ISBN: 978-0241-5381-66

Daughter of the Deep is a middle grade fantasy-adventure novel by Rick Riordan. It was published on October 26, 2021, by Disney-Hyperion, and entered The New York Times Best Seller list.

Unlike Riordan's earlier books which dealt with mythology, Daughter of the Deep is a Retrofuturism science fiction novel set in a contemporary timeline of the world of Jules Verne's books Twenty Thousand Leagues Under the Seas and The Mysterious Island. This is a derivative work, featuring machinery, tools and settings described in Verne's books, and characters who are descendants of Verne's characters. It combines both old and future technologies, melding together elements of both steampunk and artificial intelligence.

The book incorporates the tropes of sibling rivalry and the recovery of lost ancient technologies. For example, Nemo's Nautilus – now under the control of his descendants – is described as having artificial intelligence and being capable of travel via supercavitation. It follows Ana Dakkar, who is a student at Harding-Pencroft Academy. She learns that at the end of her freshman year, her class will be taken on a top secret weekend trial at sea. The plot was inspired by Jules Verne's 1870 novel Twenty Thousand Leagues Under the Seas.

== Plot ==
Ana Dakkar is a 15-year-old student at Harding-Pencroft Academy, a fictional five-year boarding high school for marine sciences, situated on a remote bluff on the southern California coast.

On a Friday morning just before the end of Ana's freshman year, she goes for a swim near campus with her older brother Dev, a 17-year-old senior, who gives her their mother's pearl necklace as an early present for her fifteenth birthday. Ana and the 19 other ninth-graders at Harding-Pencroft then head to the docks at the nearby fictional city of San Alejandro for their end-of-year trials on board the school yacht the Varuna (named for Varuna, the Hindu god of the sea), which will determine their future at the school. The trials are supervised by Dr. Theodosius Hewett, their elderly Theoretical Marine Science teacher.

Shortly after leaving the campus, Ana and her classmates see torpedoes fired from a submarine at the base of the bluff on which their school sits, collapsing the buildings into the ocean. Dr. Hewett, after launching drones to survey the wreckage, orders the freshmen back onto the bus, then onto the Varuna and out to sea, telling them that this is the work of a rival school, Land Institute, and that it is better for their own safety if the world believes them dead as well. He directs one of the boys, Gemini "Gem" Twain, to act as Ana's bodyguard. Hewett and the students then find themselves fighting off a commando raid at sea by Land Institute seniors who attempt to kidnap Ana.

The abduction is foiled with the aid of a friendly bottlenose dolphin Ana named Socrates, who knocks her would-be abductor, Caleb South, out of the water. When interrogated, Caleb proudly admits that he and his classmates destroyed Harding-Pencroft and says that they were protecting the legacy of an outlaw and selfishly hoarding technology that could greatly benefit the world. Hewett has him thrown overboard in his flotation vest and wet suit (plus water wings, which are a form of hazing for inept students at Harding-Pencroft) to join his classmates who have been set adrift in a pontoon with their hands bound.

Hewett explains to Ana and her classmates that Jules Verne's novels 20,000 Leagues Under the Seas and The Mysterious Island are actually somewhat fictionalized accounts of real events based on interviews Verne conducted with real people involved in these events, and that Ana is descended from Captain Nemo (Prince Dakkar of Bundelkhand). Hewett tells them that Nemo was a genius who developed technology far ahead of his time and Harding-Pencroft Academy and Land Institute have been battling over this technology ever since then, and their rivalry has now erupted into actual warfare. In Nemo's submarine the Nautilus, he waged a guerrilla war on the colonial powers of the late 19th century, seeking their destruction as vengeance for the murder of his wife and eldest son by the British following his participation in the Indian Rebellion of 1857 against British rule.

After Pierre Aronnax, Ned Land, and Aronnax's servant Conseil escaped Captain Nemo, they founded Land Institute in an attempt to save the world order from Nemo by acquiring or duplicating his inventions and technology. Cyrus Harding and Bonaventure Pencroft, whose encounter with Nemo was described in The Mysterious Island, told their story to Verne in an attempt to change Nemo's image and protect his legacy, and founded Harding-Pencroft Academy in accordance with Nemo's last wish – that his inventions not be misused for greed and power by the world's governments and corporations or by Land Institute.

The freshman trials were intended to be the ninth-graders' introduction to Nemo's technology, but Hewett feels that under the circumstances he must now tell them everything. Ana's friend and classmate Ester Harding, an orphan who is Cyrus Harding's fourth great-granddaughter, had been given the information months before but was sworn to secrecy by the Harding-Pencroft Academy board of trustees, under penalty of disinheritance. Long before the development of modern genetic science, Captain Nemo had learned how to biometrically link his greatest inventions to his own genes so that they might only be operated by himself or his direct descendants, which means that only Ana, who is Captain Nemo's fourth great-granddaughter and (it is believed) last surviving direct descendant, may now operate them.

Unbeknownst to the students, Hewett is suffering from advanced pancreatic cancer, and he is found comatose in his cabin on the morning of their second day at sea. Ana takes command of the Varuna and uses one of Nemo's inventions to determine their destination, a remote, uncharted Pacific atoll named Lincoln Island, where Cyrus Harding, Bonaventure Pencroft, and their companions were marooned and where Captain Nemo died aboard the Nautilus. Along the way, they learn from data extracted from the drones Hewett launched after the school's destruction that Dev had broadcast a warning over its public-address system to evacuate. In order to approach Lincoln Island, which is heavily defended and concealed from detection by a cloaking device, they must decipher a code transmitted to them by Lincoln Island staff and send back a similarly coded message.

Upon their arrival at Lincoln Island, they are greeted by the island's caretakers: a couple named Luca Barsanti (who is descended from the Italian inventor Eugenio Barsanti) and his wife Ophelia Artemesia, and Jupiter, an orangutan who has learned to cook by watching The Great British Bake Off (and quite well, the students discover). Dr. Hewett begins to receive treatment with Captain Nemo's medical technology. Luca and Ophelia introduce the students to the Nautilus, which, save for some relatively minor internal water damage, is almost intact, after sitting dormant at the bottom of a nearby lagoon for approximately 150 years after Captain Nemo died in the command chair.

Ana learns that the Nautilus is a specimen of artificial intelligence so advanced as to be sentient, and that Ana's parents, who died shortly before she entered eighth grade, discovered the Nautilus and were electrocuted in a rash attempt to board it. Ana boards it without incident by introducing herself and asking for permission, speaking in her and Captain Nemo's ancestral language of Bundeli. She then awakens the ship's advanced functions by playing a pipe organ Captain Nemo had installed on the bridge.

Ana and her classmates' exploration of the Nautilus is suddenly interrupted by the discovery that the Land Institute seniors who attacked their school have followed them to Lincoln Island in their submarine the Aronnax, and a battle ensues. During the battle, Ana and the others discover to their horror that her brother Dev, thought dead, has been collaborating with Land Institute, and is commanding the Aronnax, from which he had broadcast the warning to evacuate after Harding-Pencroft Academy's defenses had been hacked and brought down. Ana discovers that Dev has hidden a tracking device in the necklace he gave her and immediately destroys it, then uses the Nautilus's advanced propulsion systems to flee.

Two hours later, they find themselves in the western Pacific approximately 400 miles east of Davao City, Philippines, near the Palau Trench west of Koror City, Palau. There, while making repairs on the Nautilus, they meet a giant octopus the crew names Romeo; Ana befriends him with the help of a keytar and the Nautilus' artificial intelligence. They speed back to Lincoln Island, where a battle with the Aronnax immediately ensues. The battle ends with the Aronnax destroyed by the giant octopus and its crew plucked from the ocean and locked up in improvised jail cells, and a brawl between Ana and Dev which ends with her knocking him unconscious by shooting him with rubber bullets.

The novel ends with the Harding-Pencroft ninth-graders, Luca and Ophelia, and a recovering Dr. Hewett vowing to rebuild the school. Ana takes Dev, who was being groomed to take over the facility but has now forfeited practically everything, to see their parents' final resting place in the lagoon near the Nautilus.

== Reception ==
Daughter of the Deep is a New York Times and IndieBound best seller.

The book received a starred review from Kirkus Reviews, who called it "a riveting novel that will have readers rooting for its star". Shelf Awareness also provided a starred review, highlighting how the novel's, "more serious discussions, along with the inclusion of marine biology and AI concepts, are balanced by unexpected twists, heart-pounding action and vivid language". Publishers Weekly provided a positive review, calling it a "simultaneously retro and futuristic" novel that "starts with a bang and doesn't let up". School Library Journal provided a mixed review, saying that "The occasional pop culture reference may end up dating the story a bit" and that it "May be a harder sell for the typical Riordan fan".

In 2021, Daughter of the Deep received the Goodreads Choice Award for Middle Grade & Children's books.

== Cancelled film adaptation ==
Riordan confirmed on March 7, 2021, that Daughter of the Deep was "crafted with screenwriting structure and development". He also said that there are talks of a possible future feature film adaptation for the book. He reaffirmed the plans for a film on October 24, 2021, whilst confirming that he would be co-writing the film with Aditi Brennan Kapil. On April 4, 2022, Riordan revealed that the film rights were closed and that they would soon start writing the script, and on March 27, 2023 that the script had been written and sent off to Gotham Group for notes. On May 3, 2024, Riordan announced that the film was no longer moving forward at Disney+ due to budgetary reasons.

== See also ==
- List of underwater science fiction works
