= Incitatus =

Roman Emperor Caligula's favourite horse

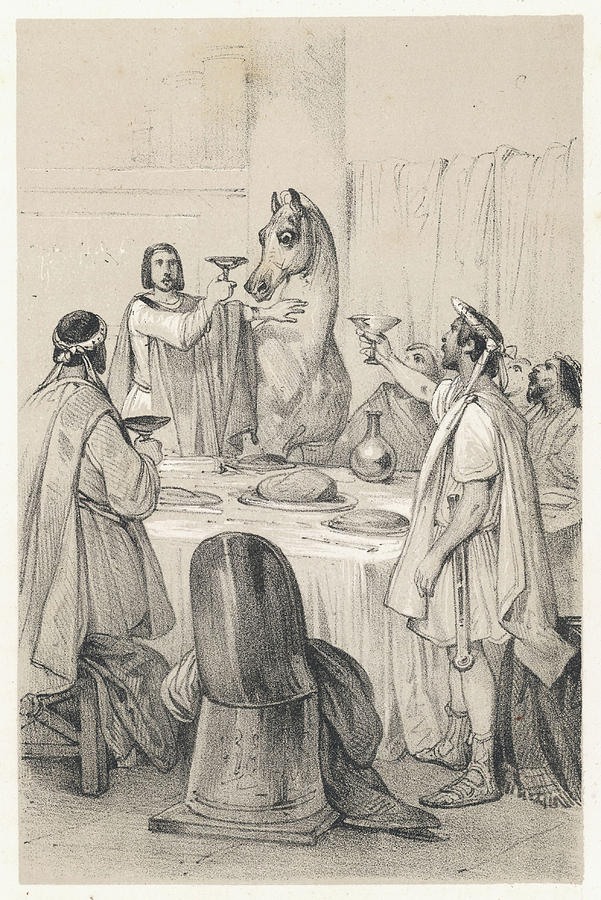
Caligula and Incitatus, drawing by Jean Victor Adam

Incitatus (Latin pronunciation: [ɪŋkɪˈtaːtʊs]; meaning "swift" or "at full gallop") was the favourite horse of Roman Emperor Caligula (r. 37–41 AD). According to legend, Caligula planned to make the horse a consul, although ancient sources are clear that this did not occur. Supposedly, Incitatus had 18 servants for himself, he lived in a marble stable, walked in a harness decorated with rare and special jewels, dressed in Tyrian purple and ate from an ivory manger.

== Legend ==
According to Suetonius in the Lives of the Twelve Caesars (121 AD), Caligula planned to make Incitatus a consul, and the horse would "invite" dignitaries to dine with him in a house outfitted with servants there to entertain such events. Suetonius also wrote that the horse had a stable of marble, with an ivory manger, purple blankets and a collar of precious stones. Cassius Dio (165–235 AD) indicated that the horse was attended by servants and was fed oats mixed with gold flake. He also notes that Caligula consecrated "his horse" as a priest in his service; this horse is not named but is often assumed to be Incitatus.

== Historical accuracy ==
The accuracy of the received history is generally questioned. Historians such as Anthony A. Barrett suggest that later Roman chroniclers such as Suetonius and Dio Cassius were influenced by the political situation of their own times, when it may have been useful to the current Roman emperors to discredit the earlier Julio-Claudian emperors. Also, the lurid nature of the story added spice to their narratives and won them additional readers. Scholars suggest that the treatment of Incitatus by Caligula was an elaborate prank intended to ridicule and provoke the Senate, rather than a sign of insanity, or was perhaps a form of satire with the implication that a horse could perform a senator's duties.

Barrett noted, "Many stories were spread about Incitatus, originating most likely from Caligula's own humorous quips... [p]ossibly out of perverted sense of humor Caligula would pour libations to Incitatus' salus [health and well-being], and claimed that he intended to co-opt him as his priest." Ancient sources are clear that the horse was never made a consul. Both Suetonius's and Dio Cassius's accounts only allege that Caligula planned to appoint Incitatus as consul, but Dio states that the plans were never realised.

== In art and metaphor ==
- Incitatus has for centuries been an allegorical figure when referencing examples of political ineptitude, going back at least to 1742.
- In Act III of Anton Chekhov's The Cherry Orchard (1904), Pishchik says that his family is "descended from that very nag Caligula inducted into the Senate."
- Aleister Crowley's Liber VII Chapter 4, v. 28–30, suggest Incitatus had a deeper significance, reading, "Who wast Thou, O Caesar, that Thou knewest God in an horse? For lo! we beheld the White Horse of the Saxon engraven upon the earth; and we beheld the Horses of the Sea that flame about the old grey land, and the foam from their nostrils enlightens us!"
- The life of Incitatus is the subject of Zbigniew Herbert's poem "Caligula" (in Pan Cogito, 1974).
- In I, Claudius, Robert Graves wrote that Incitatus was made a senator and was put on the list to become a consul; that eventually, Claudius removed the governmental stipend for Incitatus and his status as senator for lacking the monetary requirements; that later, Incitatus was slaughtered after injuring his leg at a race; and that the mate of Incitatus, Penelope, was used by Claudius during his war with Britain.
- In the 1957 Ayn Rand novel Atlas Shrugged, a mention of Incitatus is overheard by the newly wed wife of James Taggart, Cherryl. She overhears the conversation of two men apparently discussing her wedding and her husband.
- The 2000 BBC Radio 4 comedy Me and Little Boots, by Shaun McKenna, told the story of Caligula (Latin for "little boots") from the point of view of Incitatus, who was played by Leslie Phillips.
- In the 2006–2011 comic Jack of Fables, Incitatus talks so much that he risks giving away his status as a fable and frequently mentions his former status as a Roman senator.
- The progressive metal band Caligula's Horse is named after Incitatus.
- In the 2012 grand strategy game Crusader Kings II, if your character has the lunatic trait you can appoint a horse called Glitterhoof as your chancellor.
- The 2018 novel The Burning Maze by Rick Riordan presents Incitatus as a secondary antagonist.
- In the 1985 novel Chapterhouse: Dune by Frank Herbert, Scytale becomes a Tleilaxu Master despite having been born a Facedancer, seen as little more than an animal by the existing Masters.

== See also ==
- List of historical horses
- Non-human electoral candidates
