= The Trials of Apollo =

Book series by Rick Riordan

- Logo of the series
- The Hidden Oracle (2016); The Dark Prophecy (2017); The Burning Maze (2018); The Tyrant's Tomb (2019); The Tower of Nero (2020)
- Author: Rick Riordan
- Cover artist: John Rocco
- Country: US
- Language: English, Latin, Indonesia, Spanish and others (depends)
- Genre: Children's fantasy; Action fiction; Adventure fiction; Middle grade fiction; Classical mythology; More genres: Greek mythology; Roman mythology; Children's fiction
- Publisher: Hyperion (US); Penguin/Puffin (UK, AU, NZ)
- Published: 2016–2020
- Media type: Print (hardcover and paperback), audiobook, e-book
- No. of books: 5
- Preceded by: The Heroes of Olympus
- Followed by: The Nico di Angelo Adventures

The Trials of Apollo is an American children's fantasy action-adventure middle grade children's fiction book series based on Greco-Roman classical mythology, written by American author Rick Riordan. It is the third of four book series in the Camp Half-Blood Chronicles, succeeding Percy Jackson & the Olympians and The Heroes of Olympus, and preceding The Nico di Angelo Adventures. A supplementary book, Camp Jupiter Classified, has also been released in addition to the main series.

The first book in the series, The Hidden Oracle, was released in 2016. The second book, The Dark Prophecy, was released in 2017. The third book, The Burning Maze, was released in 2018. The fourth book, The Tyrant's Tomb, was released on September 24, 2019. The fifth and final book in the series, The Tower of Nero, was released on October 7, 2020.

== Synopsis ==
The series follows the god Apollo, who has been turned into a mortal named Lester Papadopoulos as punishment from his father and king of the gods Zeus. Lester meets some new friends and trains at Camp Half-Blood. He must save and return four undiscovered oracles and restore the Oracle of Delphi from Python to get back to his godly form. Zeus is angry at Apollo for several reasons, most notably for giving his blessing to his Roman descendant Octavian, allowing the latter to rise to power during The Heroes of Olympus. The final book of The Heroes of Olympus, The Blood of Olympus, takes place about six months before The Trials of Apollo.

== Books ==
=== The Hidden Oracle ===
Released on May 3, 2016, The Hidden Oracle is told in first-person by the main character Apollo. It uses haikus for chapter titles. The book opens with Apollo landing in a dumpster in an alley in New York City, in the form of a mortal teenager named Lester Papadopoulos, because of the events leading up to the war between the Greeks and the Romans. Here, he meets Meg McCaffrey. Believing that he must only undertake a simple quest to regain his immortality, Apollo and Meg travel to Camp Half-Blood with the help of Percy Jackson, where they learn that most of the world's oracles have stopped working. The two go on a quest to locate and protect one of the remaining oracles, Dodona, and to learn how to help the other oracles and regain Apollo's immortality. Apollo discovers that the first oracle he has to save is heavily guarded by the mysterious "Beast", who is revealed to be one of three evil Roman emperors-turned-minor gods, the Roman emperor Nero, as well as Meg's stepfather who later convinces Meg that he is good, and Lester is evil.

=== The Dark Prophecy ===
Released on May 2, 2017, The Dark Prophecy continues the story of Apollo as the mortal Lester, as he leaves Camp Half-Blood and journeys across North America to restore the remaining four Oracles. He learns how to defeat the Triumvirate of Roman emperors with the help of Leo Valdez, Calypso, Festus the bronze dragon, the Hunters of Artemis, and some new characters, including ex-Hunters Emmie and Jo and their daughter Georgina. Apollo has to face and defeat the second Triumvirate emperor, Commodus, with whom Apollo shares a regretful history, to obtain the Throne of Memory for his next prophecy. Apollo travels to the oracle's cave, gets the prophecy, and comes back to defend himself and his friends from Commodus, driving Commodus from Indianapolis and blinding him in the process as he reveals a sliver of his true godly form.

=== The Burning Maze ===
Released on May 1, 2018, The Burning Maze follows Lester Papadopoulos, Meg McCaffrey, and Grover Underwood as they try to rescue Herophile, an oracle that speaks only in puzzles, from the Roman emperor Caligula. After fleeing the Labyrinth, Apollo dreams about the oracle saying that he must save her even though it is a trap. When he wakes up, he is in Grover's base. Apollo and Grover go to try to find Gleeson Hedge in an army store called Macro's Military Madness. They then find out that Macro, the store owner, is actually Naevius Sutorius Macro, who works for Caligula, and he attacks them with an army of automatons. By activating command sequence Daedalus twenty-three, they defeat Macro with his own robots. They then navigate the maze with the help of Piper McLean and Jason Grace. After a raid on Caligula's naval fleet that results in Jason's death, Apollo and Meg steal a pair of Caligula's sandals, which let people navigate the Labyrinth. Piper, upset over Jason's death, is unable to help them further. The next day, Grover, Meg, and Apollo walk the Labyrinth using Caligula's shoes. They free Herophile, discover a new prophecy, and free Helios. Piper comes back and kills Medea, an evil sorceress who was working with Caligula (also Helios's grandchild). The book ends with Leo arriving from Camp Jupiter, learning about Jason's death, and Apollo and Meg going to San Francisco while Gleeson Hedge, his wife Mellie, their baby Chuck, Piper, and Piper's dad set off to Oklahoma, with a ride from Leo and Festus.

=== The Tyrant's Tomb ===
Released on September 24, 2019, The Tyrant's Tomb starts off with Apollo and Meg taking Jason's body to Camp Jupiter in the San Francisco Bay Area. On their way, they are attacked by an eurynomos, but a girl with pink hair arrives with dryads and a faun and kills the euronymous. She introduces herself as Lavinia and says she will take them to Camp Jupiter. All the dryads and fauns start to leave, but as the last faun, Don, tries to go, Lavinia says that he owes her for helping him. They carry Jason's coffin to the tunnel where Lavinia knows there is a shortcut to Camp Jupiter.

Hazel Levesque suddenly arrives, as well as two more of the euronymous. They enter the tunnel while Hazel tries to kill the euronymous. Apollo tries to sing a song to help Hazel but is scratched in the stomach by a euronymous before Hazel kills it. Due to the scratch, Apollo starts to turn into a corpse. Hazel sees Jason's coffin and is terrified because she had a dream about Jason being killed by Caligula. The five arrive in Camp Jupiter, where they are greeted by Frank Zhang and Reyna Ramírez-Arellano, the praetors. The camp decides that they will all carry on with Jason's plan to build temples honoring the gods.

Apollo then faints and has a dream about Caligula and Commodus discussing their plan to either take Camp Jupiter without conflict or destroy it using Greek fire from Caligula's yachts. Apollo wakes up in a bed and Meg explains that he has been asleep for a day and a half. There is a funeral for Jason that night, and Lupa shows up to tell Apollo to get divine help to defeat their enemies. Apollo and Frank go to Ella the harpy and Tyson the Cyclops, who are recreating the Sibylline Books. They get a prophecy regarding Tarquin's tomb. They go to the camp senate, where he, Meg, Lavinia, and Hazel are selected to go on a mission to find out more about Tarquin, the final king of Rome, who has returned. They discover that Tarquin has kept a "soundless god" at Sutro Tower. After they return, they realize that to solve the communication issues and get divine help, they need to destroy the soundless god. A quest is issued for Apollo, Meg, and Reyna to go to Sutro Tower.

At the tower, they realize the god is Harpocrates, who has had troubles with Apollo. He also has a jar containing the voice of the Sibyl of Cumae. With some difficulty, they manage to get the last breath of Harpocrates, along with Sibyl's Jar, which is required to get divine help. On their way back, they are ambushed by a euronymous again, and after they kill him, they are helped by Lavinia and her friends, who escaped from the camp earlier. Reyna and Lavinia issue "Plan L" to defeat the yachts that Apollo saw in his dream. When Apollo and Meg return, they see the camp in the midst of a war. Apollo calls for divine help on Temple Hill. He decides to call Diana. Frank sacrifices himself by burning his firewood lifeline in the process of killing Caligula to save the other legionnaires. Commodus gives the order to fire, but due to "Plan L", this fails and the yachts are destroyed. Apollo kills Commodus in the grief of losing Frank. But after the fire dies it’s revealed that Frank is mysteriously still alive.

Meanwhile, Tarquin has reached the bookshop where the Sibylline Books are being rewritten, but Ella and Tyson are not there. Meg and Hazel fight Tarquin. Diana finally arrives, kills Tarquin, and heals Apollo. Reyna and Lavinia, along with Peaches the karpos, return. Arion and Reyna pledges herself to Diana (Artemis) and joins the Hunters. Dakota, son of Bacchus and the longtime centurion of the Fifth Cohort, passes away overnight due to wounds from the battle. Don the faun also dies and gets reincarnated into a laurel tree, Apollo's tree of victory. Hazel is voted new praetor of Camp Jupiter and Lavinia is voted in as centurion of the Fifth Cohort.

Apollo receives his old godly bow as a gift from Camp Jupiter, Meg receives seeds, and they set off to New York after receiving the final prophecy from Ella and Tyson; they realize it is in terza rima form and they have to find more stanzas in the east. They go in hopes of being reunited with their friends from Camp Half-Blood.

=== The Tower Of Nero ===
Released on October 6, 2020, The Tower of Nero begins when Apollo and Meg are returning to New York. They encounter an amphisbaena, which recites the second stanza of the terza rima prophecy. They are attacked by a Gaul working for Nero, Luguselwa, or Lu, and her germani. Lu turns out to be on their side and helps them escape. The trio reaches the Upper East Side and they decide to go to Percy Jackson for help, but soon learn that Percy and Annabeth Chase are on the West Coast. They stage a fight against Lu with Apollo pushing Lu off the building so that Nero believes that she is still on his side, as Nero can see them through a security camera installed in a nearby building. Apollo and Meg reach Camp Half-Blood and the Grey Sisters recite another couplet of the terza rima prophecy. They find out that Chiron has gone to a meeting with gods from other pantheons, including Bastet from The Kane Chronicles and Mímir from Magnus Chase and the Gods of Asgard, to discuss a common problem.

Apollo, after fainting due to exhaustion on arrival, has a dream in which he sees Lu telling Nero about their escape and Nero giving an ultimatum to Meg and Apollo to surrender within two days or else Manhattan will burn. The next day, Apollo, Meg, Apollo's son Will Solace, and Will's boyfriend Nico di Angelo, go to meet Rachel Elizabeth Dare, an oracle. She warns them about some cattle that are standing outside. After they discuss a way to sabotage Nero's Greek fire vats with the help of the troglodytes, a species of good diggers, Rachel suddenly spouts the final couplet of the prophecy, but Python has meddled with it. The cattle, revealed to be the Tauri Silvestres, attack, and the five manage to escape. Nico helps them reach the troglodytes via shadow travel, and Will is revealed to have the power to glow in the dark.

At the troglodytes' encampment underground, they decide that Will, Nico, and Rachel will go with the troglodytes to disable the vats and alert Camp Half-Blood, while Meg and Apollo surrender themselves to get closer to Nero's fasces, the source of his power and immortality, and destroy it. However, it is revealed that Nero already knew of their plan. Lu's hands are cut off, and she and Apollo are thrown in prison, while Meg is forced by Nero to go to her old room in the Imperial Residences inside the Tower of Nero.

Apollo, after managing to revive Lu, finds out that a leontocephaline, a creation of the Persian god Mithras, is guarding the fasces. As a guardian of immortality, he requires a sacrifice of it in return for granting access to the fasces. Lu and Apollo escape the prison, and Lu decides to give up her immortality to get the fasces, while Apollo goes to save Meg.

Upstairs, he realizes that the entire lower floor area has become a battleground, Camp Half-Blood demigods having come in. Kayla and Austin, two of his children, help Apollo reach Meg. On the way, Lester enters the wrong room, one containing the buttons to burn up Manhattan; the button is pressed, but nothing happens, as the vats have been disabled.

After some searching, Apollo runs past a laptop. Nero video calls the laptop and tells him that he has a plan B: to release Sassanid gas, which is extremely poisonous, and kill everyone in the building, unless Apollo comes to the throne room in fifteen minutes. Apollo tells the troglodytes about the gas trap, and they run to disable it.

Meanwhile, Apollo reaches the throne room, where all the adopted children of Nero are present, including Meg. Nero orders the dryads he has captured to kill Apollo or be killed by his children. Meg stops them, choosing to stand by Apollo. Nico shows up with a Tauri Silvestri, who is now under his control. Nico orders it to kill Nero. The bull fails, but still creates chaos. Nero tries to find the remote with the button to release the Sassanid gas. One of the Imperial demigods manages to stab Apollo, but he survives.

Nero finally finds the correct remote and presses the button. Suddenly, Will, Rachel, and Lu show up, along with the troglodyte leader and the emperor's fasces. To Nero's disbelief, the troglodytes have also been successful in disabling the gas trap. Nero is forced to reveal the truth, that he is not that powerful, and is being used as a pawn by Python. If Nero is killed, then Python would become nearly impossible to kill, as the entire Triumvirate’s power would go to him. Nero is given a choice, to fight a hopeless battle and die, or live for some more years in a large prison. He chooses the first option, but gets into a tug of war with Apollo over the fasces, which Apollo was trying to break. Lester manages to use his godly powers to revoke Nero's divinity and immortality, and breaks the fasces, killing Nero.

Camp Half-Blood's forces stay at the Tower to help rehabilitate the Imperial children after the years of abuse they endured, but Apollo has to go defeat Python. Using the Labyrinth, he reaches Delphi in minutes.

Apollo faces off against Python for the final time. He is quickly overpowered by the giant snake, who utters a prophecy saying Apollo will fall, and Apollo loses his bow. The arrow of Dodona sacrifices itself to defeat Python and finishes Python's prophecy, saying that Apollo will fall, but must also rise again. Apollo manages to blind Python and make him loosen his hold by hitting Python in the eyes with the arrow of Dodona as well as his elbow. He drags Python into Tartarus with him, fulfilling Python's prophecy in a literal sense.

The two almost fall down into Chaos but are saved by a ledge. Apollo is attacked by Python, but manages to throw him off the ledge into Chaos, destroying him forever and freeing the oracles from his power. Apollo is left dangling on the edge, when the goddess of the Styx, who has been following him since he broke his oath on the Styx in the first book, congratulates him on learning his lesson, to always uphold a promise. Apollo becomes a god again, and, two weeks later, reappears on Mount Olympus, where he is welcomed back as an Olympian.

Apollo splits himself into multiple Apollos and goes to find his friends. He visits Camp Half-Blood, where Nico and Will tell him that Nico has been hearing a voice from Tartarus lately that he suspects is his old friend Iapetus the titan, also known as Bob, who seemed to have died helping Percy and Annabeth escape Tartarus in The House of Hades. With the help of the troglodytes, Nico and Will intend to travel to Tartarus to find the source of the voice and rescue Bob if they can, and Rachel delivers a prophecy about this prospective quest. Apollo visits Camp Jupiter, where Frank and Hazel are praetors. Hazel gets rid of the curse on her summoned jewels so they can now be spent, and Percy and Annabeth are attending university there. Percy studies marine biology and Annabeth architecture. He visits the Indianapolis Union Station, where Georgina is being taught by Jo how to forge blades. Reyna is there with the other Hunters of Artemis to hunt down the Teumessian Fox, as well as Leo, since Calypso is now in high school and had gone to a summer camp as a counselor. Apollo visits Piper in Oklahoma, where she has started a new life with her father and her new girlfriend Shel. Apollo also visits Meg, who is living in Palm Springs with Lu, the Imperial children whom she is teachimpanion book titled Camp Half-Blood Confidential was released on May 2, 2017. It covers background facts about Camp Half-Blood.

=== Camp Jupiter Classified ===
This book explores the story of one of the side characters, Claudia, a daughter of Cardea and descendent of Mercury, through her personal diary. She is a Roman demigod of the 12th legion.

== Main characters ==
- Lester Papadopoulos/Apollo: The mortal teenage incarnation of Apollo (god of prophecy, poetry, music, and archery, and driver of the sun) and the main character of the series. He has to deal human problems like "zits, flabby muscles, and feeling pain" once he becomes mortal. He is looking for ancient oracles which have been missing for decades in order to gain back his godhood.
- Meg McCaffrey: A twelve-year-old demigod daughter of Demeter. She is described as a colorfully dressed street urchin. She is fierce, bossy, and tight-lipped about her past. She has a grain spirit protector named Peaches. She becomes Apollo's master in The Hidden Oracle.
- Peaches: A karpos that comes to Meg when she is in need.
- Will Solace: A son of Apollo. He is the head counselor of the Apollo cabin and a healer. He assists his father and the other heroes in The Hidden Oracle and The Tower of Nero. He is dating Nico di Angelo.
- Nico di Angelo: A son of Hades. He assists Apollo and the other heroes in The Hidden Oracle and The Tower of Nero. He is dating Will Solace.
- Leo Valdez: A son of Hephaestus. He returns in The Hidden Oracle with Calypso on his bronze fire-breathing dragon, Festus, after being missing for over six months. He assists Apollo in The Dark Prophecy.
- Calypso: The daughter of the titan Atlas. After being imprisoned on the island of Ogygia for millennia, she is rescued by Leo Valdez and brought to the mortal world. She assists Apollo throughout The Dark Prophecy.
- Kayla Knowles: A daughter of Apollo. A skilled archer. She appears in The Hidden Oracle and The Tower Of Nero.
- Austin Lake: A son of Apollo.
- Grover Underwood: A satyr, protector, seeker, and Lord of the Wild. He is summoned by Meg to guide them through the Labyrinth in The Burning Maze.
- Piper McLean: A daughter of Aphrodite. She assists the heroes in The Burning Maze.
- Jason Grace: A son of Jupiter. He helps Apollo, Meg, and Piper in The Burning Maze. He dies while assisting Apollo and trying to fight Caligula, as he and Piper were given a prophecy stating that one of them will undergo a three letter word that starts with D, which is revealed to be "die".
- Reyna Avila Ramirez-Arellano: A daughter of Bellona and former praetor of the Twelfth Legion Fulminata. She assists the heroes in The Tyrant's Tomb, and then becomes a Hunter of Artemis.
- Hazel Levesque: A daughter of Pluto. She assists the heroes in The Tyrant's Tomb, where she then becomes praetor of the Twelfth Legion Fulminata alongside Frank Zhang. Hazel is dating Frank.
- Lavinia Asimov: A daughter of the muse Terpsichore. She assists the heroes in The Tyrant's Tomb, where she then becomes centurion of the Fifth Cohort.
- Frank Zhang: A son of Mars, descendant of Neptune, and praetor of the Twelfth Legion Fulminata. He assists the heroes in The Tyrant's Tomb, where he burns his stick of life, killing Caligula. Frank is dating Hazel.
- Percy Jackson: A son of Poseidon. Apollo originally intends for Percy to be his master, but he is not interested in being part of another Great Prophecy. He helps Apollo and Meg by guiding them to Camp Half-Blood.

== Later series ==
Rick Riordan has since collaborated with writer Mark Oshiro for a new novel in the Camp Half-Blood Chronicles, which follows Nico and Will traveling to Tartarus to rescue Bob. The book's title, The Sun and the Star, was announced on September 23, 2022, and was released on May 2, 2023.

== See also ==
- Muses in popular culture
