= Hotel Valhalla: Guide to the Norse Worlds =

2016 collection of short stories by Rick Riordan

- U.S. cover of first edition.
- Author: Rick Riordan
- Cover artist: John Rocco
- Series: Magnus Chase and the Gods of Asgard
- Genre: Fantasy, Norse mythology, Young adult
- Publisher: Disney Hyperion
- Publication date: August 16, 2016 (hardcover, audiobook CD, Kindle/Nook eBook)
- Publication place: United States
- Media type: Print (hardback, paperback, audiobook CD, e-book)
- Pages: 176
- ISBN: 9780141377551

Hotel Valhalla: Guide to the Norse Worlds (also known as For Magnus Chase: Hotel Valhalla Guide to the Norse Worlds) is a collection of short stories about Norse mythology. The book is a supplementary work in the Magnus Chase and the Gods of Asgard series, written by Rick Riordan. It was released on August 16, 2016 and was published in United States by Disney Hyperion, in United Kingdom by Puffin Books and was also translated into five languages to date.

Hotel Valhalla features characters from Norse mythology, including Norse gods, who narrate their stories in a humorous retelling. The book was praised for its humour and writing style, but criticized for its lack of illustrations.

== Plot ==
The introduction is written by Helgi, the hotel manager. He welcomes new residents and thanks them for their sacrifice. He then explains that the book is meant to answer any questions they may have about the experiences of their new existence, and asks that they consult the book before bothering him.

The next section, titled "What in the Worlds?" is written by Hunding the bellhop. He doesn't really want to write anything for the book, but his boss Helgi is making him do it. He explains the universe from the Norse perspective: nine worlds held in the branches of Yggdrasil the World Tree. The first of these worlds, Asgard, is home to the Aesir, and the location of Hotel Valhalla, where Odin's einherjar live. Vanaheim is the home of the Vanir, and the ream of Folkvanger, the peaceful Norse afterlife. Midgard is the Norse name for Earth, home of the humans, and is connected to Asgard by the Bifrost. Alfheim, ruled by Frey, is inhabited by light elves. There is no night in this world. Jotunheim is inhabited by the jotun, or giants. It is covered in mountains, snow, and ice. Nidavellir is home to the dwarves, and is very gloomy, chilly, and dark because it is entirely underground. Muspellheim houses the fire giants and demons, and resembles the sun. Niflheim is inhabited by the frost giants, and is cold and foggy. Finally, Helheim is the realm of Hel and the dishonorable dead. Hunding also describes the Ginnungagap, the void between the worlds, and the Norse creation story.

Hunding's description of the nine worlds is followed by sections describing some of the Norse gods and creatures, most accompanied by a supplementary short story, interview, poem, or note. The list of gods includes Odin, Thor, Loki, Frey, Freya, Skirnir, Mimir, Hel, Heimdal, Ran, Frigg, Balder, Hod, Idun, Honir, Tyr, Uller, and Njord. Hunding lists the homeworld of each one, as well as their physical description, family members, and what they are best known for. A few of the better-known gods also get a few extra facts thrown in. Snorri Sturluson manages to get interviews with a few of the gods, while others get short stories. Frey gets to have a rap battle with Jack the sword, and Frigg answers questions in a weekly advice column.

The list of mythical beings includes Surt, Ymir, Utgard-Loki, Gerd, Elves, dwarves, Valkyries, and the Norns. Each entry includes the being's classification, homeworld, appearance, and what they are best known for. The extra material includes a threat from Surt, a poem by Gerd, a message from the Alfheim news team, diary entries, and a few short stories.

Next, Hunding (who's really getting tired of having to write the book at this point) lists the fantastic creatures of the Norse world. He addresses Nidhogg, the eagle of Yggdrasil, Ratatosk, Heidrun, Eikthrymir, Saehrimnir, Sleipnir, Jormungand, Fenris wolf, and Thor's goats, Otis and Marvin, explaining what they are, where they live, and why they are noteworthy. Ratatosk manages to fit in some insults, Sleipnir tells the story of how Loki gave birth to him, and Marvin includes some tasty recipes for goat meat, while Njord provides some lullabies written by Frey that are useful in keeping Jormungand asleep.

Helgi closes the book, urging the readers to consider all the possibilities that their afterlife affords them. He again strongly discourages them from asking him any questions. A pronunciation guide and glossary are also included.

== Characters ==
- Baldr
- Frey
- Sumarbrander
- Thor
- Odin
- Tyr

== Reception ==
Horn Book Magazine writes "Written as a handbook for new einherjar, Odin's warriors in Valhalla, this irreverent volume uses wry humor and a variety of devices (interviews, dossier-style highlights, first-person confessionals, a rap battle) to overview the gods and gossip of Norse mythology. Heroic-looking black-and-white sketches add visual interest, while an appendix contains a pronunciation guide. Hints throughout point to the next Magnus Chase installment." Hypable writes "In fact, it reads a lot like J.K. Rowling’s Tales of Beedle the Bard or Fantastic Beasts and Where to Find Them. Riordan clearly has his own voice, though, and the myriad of characters who step forward to write entries in Hotel Valhalla quickly make a name for themselves." A staff reviewer for YA Books Central expressed sadness for the lack of drawings.
