= The Chalice of the Gods =

2023 novel by Rick Riordan

- Cover art
- Authors: Rick Riordan
- Cover artist: Victo Ngai
- Series: Percy Jackson & the Olympians
- Release number: 6
- Genres: Children's fantasy; Action fiction; Adventure fiction; Middle grade fiction; Classical mythology; More genres: Greek mythology; Roman mythology; Children's fiction
- Publisher: Disney Hyperion
- Publication date: September 26, 2023
- Publication place: United States
- Pages: 288 (hardcover edition)
- ISBN: 9781368098175
- Preceded by: The Last Olympian (series); The Blood of Olympus (chronological)
- Followed by: Wrath of the Triple Goddess

The Chalice of the Gods is a 2023 American children's fantasy novel based on Greco-Roman classical mythology written by American author Rick Riordan. Released on September 26, 2023, by Disney Hyperion, it is the sixth novel of the Percy Jackson & the Olympians series, doubling as the first novel of The Senior Year Adventures. It serves as a follow-up to the original five books, taking place after the events of the series The Heroes of Olympus but before The Trials of Apollo series.

== Plot ==
Percy Jackson is informed by his father Poseidon that, because he was never was supposed to exist due to the pact after World War II about the Big Three having no more children, Percy is ineligible for New Rome University. However, Zeus has agreed to allow Percy to attend on the condition that he completes three new quests for the gods and get letters of recommendation from each god. Poseidon helps Percy put an advertisement out for his services while assigning Eudora, a nereid, to be Percy's school guidance counselor as further assistance. Percy's girlfriend, Annabeth Chase, and his best friend, Grover Underwood, volunteer to help Percy complete the quests.

Zeus' cup-bearer, Ganymede, responds to the advert, needing help because his chalice of immortality has been stolen and Ganymede needs to recover it before the other gods find out, therefore ruining his reputation and relationship with his boss, Zeus. Percy and his friends investigate Hebe and Iris as potential suspects and are forced to work around Percy's school schedule. As the trio heads towards Hebe's shop, they encounter many difficulties, with even being turned into toddlers again! After getting chased down by chickens and turned back into normal teenagers again, they get helpful information from Hebe that guides them towards Iris and her location. Once they reach Iris's lair, they go on a dangerous mission to clean her messenger staff. Although both are cleared of any wrongdoing, in exchange for the three cleansing her magical staff, Iris uncovers the true culprit as Geras, the god of old age, and helps Percy, Annabeth, and Grover to locate him. Percy challenges Geras to a wrestling match to the death, but ultimately wins by embracing Geras and, in effect, old age and everything that comes with mortality, winning Geras' respect and the return of the chalice.

However, Percy, Annabeth, and Grover get a distress call from Ganymede that Zeus is holding a sudden brunch for his mother, Rhea, meaning that Ganymede needs the chalice back immediately. With the assistance of Grover, Annabeth's cap of invisibility, and Zeus' kitchen staff, Percy sneaks into Zeus's palace, where he gets Ganymede alone with the unexpected help of Athena and returns the chalice to him just in time. Ganymede gives Percy a magical piece of paper on which Percy, his pregnant mother, Sally, his stepfather, Paul, and Annabeth dictate his first recommendation letter. Poseidon reassures Percy that he's always watching over him and tells Percy that his small act of heroism in helping Ganymede proves Percy to be a true hero more than any of his world-saving quests did as Percy had kept his promise to the god and challenges Geras not to save the world or to get the letter in the end, but because it's who he is. Percy and Annabeth make plans for their future together and to get the rest of the letters that Percy will need to secure his entrance into college.

== Background ==
The Chalice of the Gods was announced on October 18, 2022. On February 24, 2023, the cover art was announced alongside the final release date for the project. The cover art was done by Victo Ngai, and the release date was September 26, 2023.

== Sequel ==
Wrath of the Triple Goddess follows Percy's quest to acquire college recommendations. The sequel was announced by Riordan on September 26, 2023 at a launch event for The Chalice of the Gods. Riordan also confirmed that The Chalice of the Gods is the first installment of a trilogy of novels, known as The Senior Year Adventures, that covers Percy's transition from high school to college.
