= Wrath of the Triple Goddess =

2024 novel by Rick Riordan

- Cover art
- Authors: Rick Riordan
- Cover artist: Victo Ngai
- Series: Percy Jackson & the Olympians
- Release number: 7
- Genres: Children's fantasy; Action fiction; Adventure fiction; Middle grade fiction; Classical mythology; More genres: Greek mythology; Roman mythology; Children's fiction
- Publisher: Disney Hyperion
- Publication date: September 24, 2024
- Publication place: United States
- Pages: 336 (standard edition)
- ISBN: 9780241691694
- Preceded by: The Chalice of the Gods

Wrath of the Triple Goddess is an American children's fantasy novel based on Greco-Roman classical mythology written by American author Rick Riordan. Released on September 24, 2024 by Disney Hyperion, it is the seventh novel of the Percy Jackson & the Olympians series and the second of The Senior Year Adventures, taking place after the events of The Chalice of the Gods. It follows Percy Jackson adventuring during his senior year of high school.

== Plot ==
A week before Halloween, the goddess of magic Hecate enlists Percy Jackson while he is at school to house-sit for her crumbling mansion and look after her pets, Hecuba the hellhound and Gale the polecat, promising Percy his second godly letter of recommendation in return, but threatening to smite him should Percy fail her. In turn, Percy enlists his friends Annabeth and Grover to help and the three decide to host a Halloween party for Camp Half-Blood at the mansion.

While left alone in the house, Grover drinks a strawberry-flavored potion, resulting in him wrecking the mansion and Hecuba and Gale escaping. The search for Hecuba leads Percy to the ruins of Troy where Hecuba was once the queen of the city before it was destroyed, and the goddess transformed her into a hellhound. Percy helps Hecuba to confront her grief over the loss of her children and accept the new family that she is building with Hecate, Gale, and Nope the hellhound puppy that Percy had found while searching for Hecuba with Mrs. O'Leary's help.

The search for Gale leads to Grover using dangerous nature magic and confessing his fears of being left behind when Percy and Annabeth move to California for college. Percy and Grover eventually track Gale to a series of perfume shops run by Circe's former naiad attendants who seek revenge upon Percy and Annabeth for destroying their home. With the naiads transforming the trio into creatures, Percy works with Gale to concoct a cure, learning of Gale's past as a powerful and benevolent witch who was met with fear and violence before being transformed by Hecate out of empathy for her situation. Although given the chance to become human again by Percy, Gale refuses as she is happy as a polecat. Percy subsequently decides to do a project in his history class on Gale where Chiron briefly serves as his substitute teacher.

On Halloween, Percy, Annabeth and Grover summon an army of ghosts led by Peter Stuyvesant to magically repair Hecate's mansion. Although successful, the ghosts turn against them because Peter, who is actually a demigod son of Hecate, hates his mother and seeks to purge her pagan influence from New York City. The arrival of Camp Half-Blood for the Halloween party buys Percy and Annabeth time to banish the ghosts. With the situation resolved, everyone enjoys partying in Hecate's spooky mansion.

The next morning, Hecate returns and is satisfied with the state of her house and pets, giving Percy his second letter of recommendation. Having learned a lot during his time house-sitting, Percy admits the truth about what occurred to the goddess and convinces her to trust Hecuba and Gale more, to allow Gale to practice her alchemy again, and to reopen the magic school that Hecate had run before it was closed in 1914 after World War I had divided Hecate's students and led to chaos. Hecate's loneliness and regrets are the true reason for her crumbling mansion and turning away prospective talented young students, including a young Sally Jackson, who need the goddess' guidance. In addition, Percy convinces Hecate to hire Eudora as her admissions director once the nereid is through helping Percy get into college.

== Background ==
Wrath of the Triple Goddess was announced by Riordan on September 26, 2023 at a launch event for The Chalice of the Gods. On January 18, 2024, the cover art was announced alongside the final release date for the project. The cover art was done by Victo Ngai, and the release date was September 24, 2024.

== Sequel ==
While on tour for Wrath of the Triple Goddess, Rick Riordan promised that he intended to write the third and final book in The Senior Year Adventures series. However, Riordan confirmed the book would not release in 2025 as he was instead busy working on The Court of the Dead and the television adaptation of Percy Jackson & the Olympians.
