= Big Red Tequila =

1997 novel by Rick Riordan

- Author: Rick Riordan
- Language: English
- Genre: Mystery
- Published: 1997
- Publisher: Bantam
- Publication date: 1997
- Publication place: United States

Big Red Tequila is the first novel in Rick Riordan's Tres Navarre series and Riordan's first published book. It was first published by Bantam Books in 1997. It is a fast-paced crime story about an unusually talented and flawed hero, Jackson "Tres" Navarre, a third-generation Texan, who has a PhD from Berkeley in medieval studies and English, works as an unlicensed private investigator, and is a tai chi master.

This novel won the Anthony Award for best original paperback and the Shamus Award for best First Private Investigator novel in 1997.
