= Percy Jackson & the Olympians =

Children's fantasy adventure book series

- Logo of the series
- Original Series: The Lightning Thief (2005); The Sea of Monsters (2006); The Titan's Curse (2007); The Battle of the Labyrinth (2008); The Last Olympian (2009); The Senior Year Adventures: The Chalice of the Gods (2023); Wrath of the Triple Goddess (2024)
- Author: Rick Riordan
- Cover artist: John Rocco (books 1-5); Victo Ngai (book 6-7)
- Country: United States
- Language: English
- Genre: Children's fiction; fantasy; Greek mythology retelling
- Publisher: Disney Hyperion (US); Miramax Books (US, first edition)
- Published: June 28, 2005 – May 5, 2009; September 23, 2023–present
- Media type: Print (hardcover and paperback), audiobook, e-book
- No. of books: 19 (including sequel series)
- Followed by: The Heroes of Olympus

Percy Jackson & the Olympians is a fantasy novel series by American author Rick Riordan. It is the first of four book series in the Camp Half-Blood Chronicles, preceding The Heroes of Olympus, The Trials of Apollo, and The Nico di Angelo Adventures. (Note: Except The Senior Year Adventures, which succeeds The Heroes of Olympus and precedes The Trials of Apollo and The Nico di Angelo Adventures.) The novels are set in a world where the Greek gods exist in the 21st century. The series follows the protagonist, Percy Jackson, a young demigod who must prevent the Titans, led by Kronos, from destroying the world.

The first three books were published in the United States by Miramax Books before they were folded into Hyperion Books; that house published the remaining books. All the books were published in the United Kingdom by Penguin Books. Four supplementary books, along with graphic novel versions of the first five books, have also been released. By January 2022, the books had sold more than 180 million copies worldwide, making the series one of the best-selling of all time. A follow-up trilogy in the series, The Senior Year Adventures, takes place after the events of The Heroes of Olympus and began in 2023 with The Chalice of the Gods. Three sequel series, The Heroes of Olympus, The Trials of Apollo, and The Nico di Angelo Adventures, follow.

The first book was adapted as a film titled Percy Jackson & the Olympians: The Lightning Thief (2010). It was commercially successful but received mixed reviews from critics and the audience for its departure from the book. The first book was also adapted into a musical. The second book was adapted as a film titled Percy Jackson: Sea of Monsters (2013), which also received mixed reviews. A television series based on the novels premiered on Disney+ in 2023 to positive reviews.

== Origins ==
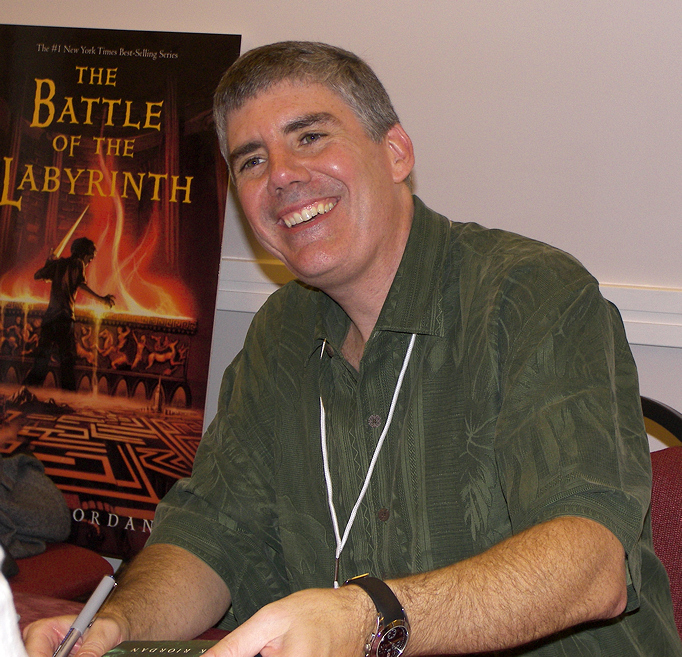
Riordan at the Texas Book Festival in November 2007, doing publicity for Book 4

Rick Riordan has said that the idea for the Percy Jackson series began when he was telling bedtime stories to his son, Haley Riordan. Haley had been diagnosed with ADHD and dyslexia, inspiring Riordan to make the titular protagonist, Percy Jackson, hyperactive and dyslexic.

Riordan created the fictional character of Percy Jackson and a story about his traveling across the United States to recover Zeus's lightning bolt. Haley suggested his dad should make it a book, and Riordan wrote what became known as The Lightning Thief over the next year.

After submitting his manuscript to his agent and editor, Riordan presented the book to a group of sixth, seventh, and eighth graders for their reactions. He gained their approval and, with their help, came up with the book title and the way Percy's sword works. In 2004, the book was sold to Miramax Books for enough money that Riordan could quit his job and focus on writing full-time. After it was published in 2005, it sold more than 1.2 million copies. The book was released in multiple editions, including hardcover, paperback, and audio editions. It has been translated into multiple languages and published internationally.

== Plot ==
The original series is set in the mid-2000s and follows Perseus "Percy" Jackson, a 12-year-old boy who learns he is the son of the Greek god Poseidon. Zeus, Poseidon, and Hades had sworn not to father any more children after World War II, and as such, Poseidon did not interact with him as a child. The gods took that pledge because their children were too powerful and had the potential to cause immense slaughter (in the universe's continuity, World War II was a conflict among their offspring). When Percy learns that his life is at risk, as ferocious monsters are out to kill him because of his demigod status and strength, he also learns that Camp Half-Blood, a training facility on Long Island, New York, houses more demigods like him. He journeys with camper, Annabeth Chase, a daughter of Athena, and his best friend and traveling companion, Grover Underwood, a satyr who is his guardian. As the threat posed by the Titans grows, Percy begins to complete remarkable tasks, fulfill predictions, and engage in combat with and for the gods. He realizes that he can either contribute to the world's destruction or preservation.

== Books ==
=== Original series ===
==== The Lightning Thief ====
The Lightning Thief is the first book in the series and was released on June 28, 2005.

When Percy Jackson comes home for the summer, he and his mother, Sally Jackson, travel to their cabin in Montauk just like every other year. However, the trip halts after multiple incidents, including an attack by the Minotaur, resulting in Sally's disappearance. Percy reaches Camp Half-Blood, a demigod training camp, and discovers he is son of Poseidon. He also learns his best friend, Grover Underwood, is a satyr, and Zeus suspects Percy has stolen his Master Bolt. Percy sets out with Grover, and Annabeth Chase, daughter of Athena, to save his mother and retrieve the lightning bolt from Hades, the suspected thief. As they journey to the underworld, they face numerous monsters. After confronting Hades, they learn their friend Luke Castellan, son of Hermes, is the thief. Luke stole the lightning bolt to allow Kronos, the defeated King of the Titans, to rise again and Ares was manipulated by Kronos and helped cover up Luke's crime to instigate a war between the Olympians. Percy confronts Luke at Camp Half Blood, which ends with Luke attacking him; Percy narrowly survives and Luke escapes. At summer's end, Percy returns home to his mother back from Hades' realm as an expression of gratitude.

The book was adapted into a film by 20th Century Fox under the title Percy Jackson & the Olympians: The Lightning Thief (2010), which was directed by Chris Columbus. Riordan did not endorse the film.

==== The Sea of Monsters ====
The Sea of Monsters is the second novel in the series and was released on April 1, 2006.

Camp Half-Blood falls under attack when Thalia's tree, which guards the borders of camp against monsters, is poisoned and begins to die. To save the tree and the camp, someone must recover the Golden Fleece, located somewhere in the Sea of Monsters (the Bermuda Triangle). Percy then learns Grover, who was on a quest to find Pan, has been captured by the Cyclops Polyphemus, and is on the Cyclops's island, where the Fleece resides. Percy goes to rescue Grover with Annabeth and his Cyclops half-brother Tyson, even though Tantalus, the new camp activities director, has prohibited him from doing so. Meanwhile, Ares' daughter Clarisse La Rue is sent on an official quest by Camp Half-Blood to retrieve the Fleece. The trip to the Sea of Monsters is long and hazardous, and along the way, the heroes encounter several dangers. Percy also learns of a prophecy from the Oracle of Delphi: A child of one of "the Big Three" gods (Zeus, Poseidon, and Hades) will play a vital part in the success or failure of resurrecting Kronos the Titan-King and saving Olympus. Following a reencounter with Luke, the heroes retrieve the Fleece and restore Thalia's tree, resurrecting Thalia, daughter of Zeus.

The book was adapted into a film by 20th Century Fox under the title Percy Jackson: Sea of Monsters (2013), which was directed by Thor Freudenthal. Riordan did not approve of the film's screenplay, which differed from the book's plot.

==== The Titan's Curse ====
The Titan's Curse is the third novel in the series, released on May 1, 2007.

On a mission to rescue Bianca and Nico di Angelo; Percy, Annabeth, Thalia and Grover are attacked by a Manticore. Although they are rescued by the goddess Artemis, Annabeth is captured. Later, while hunting for the Ophiotaurus, Artemis is also taken. Artemis's lieutenant Zoë Nightshade, daughter of Atlas, leads Bianca (now a Hunter of Artemis), Thalia, and Grover on a quest to save her. Percy follows and joins them on behalf of Nico di Angelo, to protect Nico's sister, Bianca, and find Annabeth. The group encounters multiple monsters and challenges. While they fight Talos, a giant automaton guarding the junkyard, Bianca sacrifices herself to save the others and dies. They find Artemis holding the sky after taking the burden from a deeply-exhausted Annabeth. Percy then takes it from Artemis, and they trick Atlas into taking it back. When Zoë dies saving Artemis, Thalia takes her place as Artemis' lieutenant. Thalia becomes immortal, escaping the Great Prophecy, leaving Percy to fulfill it. Back at camp, Percy informs Nico about Bianca's death. Nico blames Percy for failing and runs away, after causing skeletal warriors invading the camp to fall into the dark void of the Underworld, alerting Percy that Hades is Nico and Bianca's father.

==== The Battle of the Labyrinth ====
The Battle of the Labyrinth, the fourth installment in the series, was released on May 6, 2008.

At Camp Half-Blood, the swordsman Quintus is subbing for Mr. D while Mr. D is away recruiting minor gods to join the war against the Titan Kronos. Percy, Annabeth, Grover, and Tyson venture on a quest to find Daedalus's workshop in the Labyrinth, while Luke Castellan and his army look for it too with the help of Ariadne's string. The group goes into the labyrinth, and face many monsters. They discover a forge belonging to the god Hephaestus being used by Kronos' smiths. To escape, Percy triggers a volcanic eruption that puts him in a coma. He awakens on the island Ogygia, being tended by Calypso. He eventually returns to his friends and recruits Rachel Elizabeth Dare, to navigate the Labyrinth. With her help, the group finds Daedalus's workshop, where they discover that Quintus is Daedalus. He betrays them and sells them out to Luke, forcing the group to flee back to camp. Luke's army follows them and a battle arises. The demigods win but suffer many casualties including Daedalus, Castor, and Lee Fletcher. Afterwards, they prepare for the oncoming war against Lord Kronos, who has possessed the body of Luke and has risen to obliterate Olympus.

==== The Last Olympian ====
The Last Olympian, the fifth in the series, was released on May 5, 2009.

Percy learns that Kronos' forces are preparing to attack Olympus. Poseidon tells Percy the meaning of the Great Prophecy. Percy bathes in the River Styx, making his body invulnerable except for one chosen part (his Achilles' heel). Kronos seizes New York City, putting its mortal citizens to sleep. Percy leads a group to protect Mount Olympus. At Olympus, the gods battle Typhon, who's making his way to New York. Kronos, possessing Luke's body, forces his way into Olympus and battles Percy in Olympus' throne room. Typhon reaches New York but is defeated by Poseidon's forces, led by Tyson. Annabeth helps Luke overcome Kronos, and Percy gives Annabeth's cursed knife to Luke. Luke, who also bathed in the River Styx to host Kronos, dies after stabbing himself in his own "Achilles' heel," destroying Kronos and saving Mount Olympus. Percy rejects the gods' offer of immortality, requesting instead that the gods each claim all their children and have cabins for each god. Rachel becomes Apollo's next Oracle, breaking Hades' curse, and recites the next Great Prophecy. Percy and Annabeth become a couple, amid ominous clouds looming over Rachel. The story continues in The Heroes of Olympus, The Trials of Apollo, and The Nico di Angelo Adventures.

=== The Senior Year Adventures ===
==== The Chalice of the Gods ====
The Chalice of the Gods, the sixth installment in the series, was released on September 26, 2023. In the book, Percy Jackson is informed by his father Poseidon that, because he was never supposed to exist due to the pact, he is ineligible to attend New Rome University. However, Zeus has agreed to allow Percy to attend on the condition that he complete three new quests for gods and get letters of recommendation from each god. Poseidon helps Percy by putting an ad out for his services while assigning Eudora, a nereid, to be Percy's school guidance counselor. Annabeth and Grover volunteer to help Percy complete the quests.

Zeus' cup-bearer Ganymede responds to the advertisement, needing help because his chalice of immortality has been stolen and Ganymede needs to recover it before the other gods find out. Percy and his friends investigate Hebe and Iris as potential suspects, and are forced to work around Percy's school schedule. In exchange for the three cleansing her magical staff, Iris reveals the true culprit as Geras, god of old age, and helps Percy, Annabeth and Grover to locate him. Percy challenges Geras to a wrestling match to the death, but ultimately wins by embracing Geras and in effect, old age and everything that comes with mortality, winning Geras' respect and the return of the chalice.

Percy, Annabeth, and Grover get a distress call from Ganymede: Zeus is hosting a brunch for his mother Rhea, and Ganymede needs the chalice back immediately. With the assistance of Grover, Annabeth's cap of invisibility, and Zeus' kitchen staff, Percy sneaks into Zeus's palace and gets the chalice to Ganymede just in time. Ganymede gives Percy a magical piece of paper on which Percy, his pregnant mother Sally, his stepfather Paul and Annabeth dictate his first recommendation letter. Poseidon reassures Percy that he's always watching over him and tells Percy that his small act of heroism in helping Ganymede proves Percy to be a true hero more than any of his world-saving quests. Percy and Annabeth make plans for their future together and to get the rest of the letters that Percy will need to secure his entrance into college.

==== Wrath of the Triple Goddess ====
Wrath of the Triple Goddess, the seventh installment in the series, was released on September 24, 2024. The book follows Percy, Annabeth, and Grover as they tackle the troubles of pet-sitting at the goddess Hecate's house. When a dangerous strawberry potion is left alone with Grover, the house gets destroyed and the pets escape. Percy and his crew try find them before Hecate comes back.

== Supplementary works ==
=== The Demigod Files ===
The Demigod Files, also written by Rick Riordan, is the first companion book to the series. It was released February 10, 2009, featuring three short stories, interviews with the campers, puzzles and pictures. It is set between The Battle of the Labyrinth and The Last Olympian. The book received mixed reviews, with some reviewers criticizing the lack of substantial material and others commenting on the writing of the short stories. The stories are "Percy Jackson and the Stolen Chariot", "Percy Jackson and the Bronze Dragon", "The Camper Interviews", and "Percy Jackson and the Sword of Hades". At the end of the book, there are portraits of the characters of the series.

=== Percy Jackson's Greek Gods ===
Percy Jackson's Greek Gods is a companion book to the series. It reads as a comprehensive guide to the different Greek gods. The audiobook is read by Jesse Bernstein.

=== The Ultimate Guide ===
The Ultimate Guide is a companion book, second to the series, released on January 19, 2010. This book has a magnetic cover and holographic character pictures that change into four different characters. Its 156 pages include trading cards, full-color diagrams, and maps. It also includes a dictionary of almost every monster Percy faces in the series, with pictures beside some, as well as various activities. The book tells of Percy Jackson's starting life as a half-blood, a tour of the Underworld by Nico di Angelo, the story of Sally Jackson's parents, and items used throughout the series. There is also a paperback version.

=== Graphic novels ===
Graphic novels based on each book of the series have been released: The Lightning Thief on October 12, 2010, The Sea of Monsters on July 2, 2013, The Titan's Curse on October 8, 2013, The Battle of the Labyrinth on October 2, 2018, and The Last Olympian on August 13, 2019.

=== Demigods and Monsters ===
Demigods and Monsters is an unofficial companion book and was released on February 11, 2009. With an introduction by Riordan, it features essays written by various young adult authors that explore, discuss and provide further insight into the Percy Jackson series. It also contains information on the places and characters of the series, as well as a glossary of Greek myths.

=== The Demigod Diaries ===
The Demigod Diaries contains four new stories with character interviews, illustrations of characters and more, puzzles, and a quiz. The four stories include the adventures of Thalia, Luke, and Annabeth, and others that precede the Percy Jackson and the Olympians series and a first-person narrative from Percy's viewpoint. Set a month after the events of The Last Olympian and before he goes missing in The Lost Hero, Percy and Annabeth retrieve Hermes' stolen staff. One of the stories is written by Riordan's son, Haley, and revolves around one of the demigods who fought for Kronos during the Second Titan War and survived the battle in Manhattan. The Demigod Diaries also contains a story involving Jason, Leo, and Piper that recounts their time spent at Camp Half-Blood between The Lost Hero and The Mark of Athena.

== Reception ==
The Lightning Thief received mostly positive reviews and won awards including the School Library Journal Best Book of 2005. The New York Times praised The Lightning Thief as "perfectly paced, with electrifying moments chasing each other like heartbeats". Author Rick Riordan said of the various awards, "The ultimate compliment for a children's writer is when the kids like it."

Like its predecessor, The Sea of Monsters won several prizes and received generally positive reviews as well. It sold over 100,000 copies in hardcover by the time it was released in paperback and reviewers have praised the storyline, themes and the author's style of writing. Matt Berman, of Common Sense Media, praised the book, saying "The Percy Jackson series continues to be pure fun, with the author doing nearly everything right to produce a book that few kids will be able to resist." Kirkus reviewed The Battle of the Labyrinth as, "This volume can stand alone, but no one will be able to read just one [...] look no further for the next Harry Potter, meet Percy Jackson as legions of fans already have." As of December 11, 2019, it has been on the New York Times Children's Series Best Seller List for 665 weeks.

Some critics, especially Christian critics, of Riordan have disapproved of the emphasis on pagan gods in his books. Riordan responds to these complaints by reminding his readers that first and foremost,

The Lightning Thief explores Greek mythology in a modern setting, but it does so as a humorous work of fantasy. I'm certainly not interested in changing or contradicting anyone's religious beliefs. Early in the book, the character Chiron makes a distinction between God, capital-G, the creator of the universe, and the Greek gods. Chiron says he does not want to delve into the issue of God, but he has no qualms about discussing the Olympians because they are a "much smaller matter".

Critics such as The Calico Critic have also disagreed with the fusion of Greek mythology and modern American culture. They have stated that it is difficult to believe "the reality of the tale", claiming that "monsters in the St. Louis Arch" and "the entrance to Olympus in New York" were unimaginable, despite Riordan's explanations of why he chose these certain locations.

== Adaptations ==
=== Films ===
Chris Columbus directed and produced Percy Jackson & the Olympians: The Lightning Thief for 20th Century Fox through 1492 Pictures. The film was released February 2, 2010. Columbus has stated that he was drawn to directing the Percy Jackson movie because it gave him the "opportunity to do a movie that we haven't really seen before for this generation. When I was a kid, there were movies that dealt with Greek mythology, which in terms of visual effects was really primitive. So I thought this was an opportunity to deal with Greek mythology which children and adults all over the world are fascinated by and it was not a new genre but a new avenue, dealing with mythological creatures in a contemporary setting".

The second film in the series, Percy Jackson: Sea of Monsters, was released on August 7, 2013. A third film was in development but never went into production.

=== Video game ===
A video game based on the film adaption of The Lightning Thief developed by Activision was released exclusively for Nintendo DS on February 11, 2010. GameZone's Michael Splechta gave it a 6/10, saying "Percy Jackson might not make a splash when it comes to movie tie-in games, but fans of turn-based combat might find some redeeming qualities in this otherwise bare-bones game." On Metacritic, the game has a score of 56 out of 100 based on 6 reviews, indicating "mixed or average reviews".

=== Musical ===
On January 12, 2017, A Series of Unfortunate Events story editor Joe Tracz wrote a musical adaptation of The Lightning Thief. The musical debuted off-Broadway in 2017, before going on a national tour in 2019, followed by a 16-week limited run on Broadway from October 2019 to January 2020. It was nominated for three Drama Desk Awards in 2017, including a nomination for Outstanding Musical.

=== Television series ===
The rights to the Percy Jackson novels were transferred to Disney following its acquisition of 21st Century Fox in 2019. In May 2020, Riordan announced that Disney would be producing a live-action television series following the story of the series, with the first season adapting The Lightning Thief. Riordan also confirmed that he, along with his wife Becky, would be involved in the development of the series, a significant departure from the film series, in which Riordan was mostly shut out of the filmmaking process. The series was greenlit in January 2022, began production in June 2022, and premiered on Disney+ on December 19, 2023. A second season premiered in December 2025, and a third season was confirmed in March 2025, set to premier on November 20, 2026.

== Related series ==
=== Sequel series ===
==== The Heroes of Olympus ====
The Heroes of Olympus is a sequel series, also based on Camp Half-Blood and Greek mythology. Additionally, it introduces Camp Jupiter and its associated Roman mythology. The first book The Lost Hero was released on October 12, 2010. Like the first series, there are five books.

The second book in The Heroes of Olympus, The Son of Neptune, was released in October 2011. The third book, The Mark of Athena, was released on October 2, 2012. The fourth book, The House of Hades, was released on October 8, 2013. The fifth and final book of The Heroes of Olympus series, The Blood of Olympus, was released on October 7, 2014.

==== The Trials of Apollo ====
Riordan's follow up series to The Heroes of Olympus book series is titled The Trials of Apollo. It is written from the point of view of Apollo, having been cast down from Olympus by Zeus. The first installment, titled The Hidden Oracle, was released on May 3, 2016. The second book, titled The Dark Prophecy, was released in May 2017. The third book, titled The Burning Maze, was released on May 1, 2018. The fourth book of the series, The Tyrant's Tomb, was released on September 24, 2019. The fifth and last book of the pentalogy, The Tower of Nero, was released on October 6, 2020.

=== Other series ===
==== The Kane Chronicles ====
The novels are set within the same fictional universe as the three previous book series, and are narrated alternately in first-person by the two protagonist-siblings Carter and Sadie Kane. The siblings are descended from the two pharaohs Narmer and Ramses the Great and are powerful magicians. They and their friends are forced to contend with Egyptian gods and goddesses who still interact with the real world. The series includes a trilogy consisting of The Red Pyramid (2010), The Throne of Fire (2011), and The Serpent's Shadow (2012), as well as three crossover books with the Percy Jackson & the Olympians series.

==== Magnus Chase and the Gods of Asgard ====
The main protagonist Magnus Chase, son of the Vanir god of fertility Frey, narrates the novel in first person. He has a relationship with Alex Fierro, another main character, and his Valkyrie is Samirah al-Abbas, a daughter of Loki. He is also the cousin of Annabeth Chase. The series consists of three books: The Sword of Summer (2015), The Hammer of Thor (2016), and The Ship of the Dead (2017).

== See also ==
- List of artistic depictions of dyslexia
- Muses in popular culture
- From the Files of the Time Rangers – also based on the premise of Greek gods active in modern-day United States
- Myth-o-Mania – children's book series depicting modern twists on Greek mythology
