= Rick Riordan =

American author (born 1964)

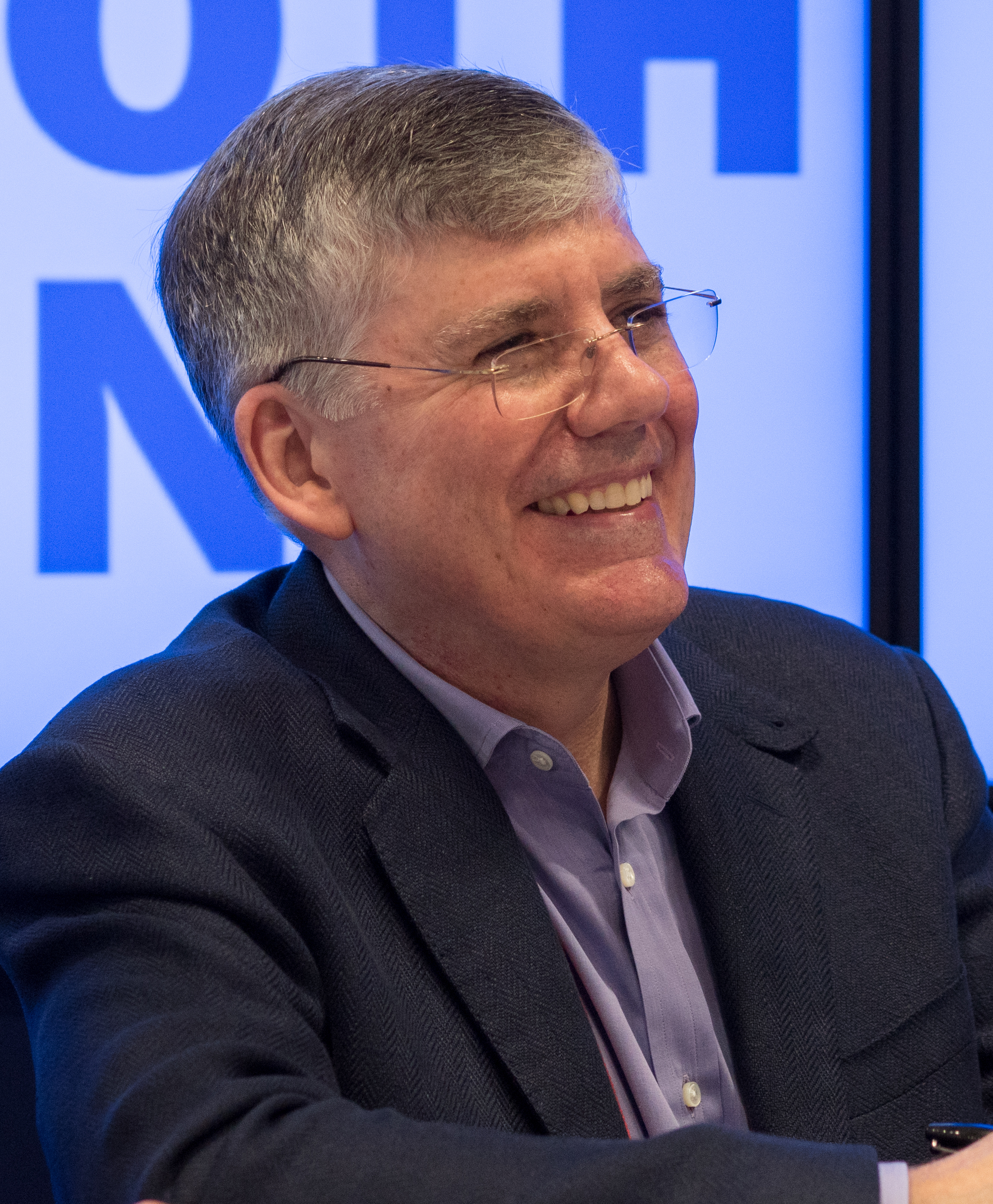
- Riordan in 2018
- Born: Richard Russell Riordan Jr. June 5, 1964 (age 62); San Antonio, Texas, U.S.
- Education: University of Texas at San Antonio
- Occupation: Novelist
- Spouse: Rebecca Klahn (m. 1985)
- Children: 2
- Writing career
- Years active: 1997–present
- Genres: Mythology; fantasy; detective fiction
- Notable works: Percy Jackson & the Olympians pentalogy; The Kane Chronicles trilogy; The Heroes of Olympus pentalogy; Magnus Chase and the Gods of Asgard trilogy; The Trials of Apollo pentalogy
- Website: rickriordan.com

Richard Russell Riordan Jr. (/ˈraɪərdən/ RY-ər-dən; born June 5, 1964) is an American author, best known for his Camp Half-Blood Chronicles, which includes the Percy Jackson & the Olympians series, The Heroes of Olympus series, The Trials of Apollo series, and The Nico di Angelo Adventures series. Riordan's books have been translated into 42 languages and sold more than 30 million copies in the United States.

Riordan's first full-length novel was Big Red Tequila, which became the first book in the Tres Navarre series. His breakthrough was The Lightning Thief (2005), the first novel in the five-volume Percy Jackson & the Olympians series, which placed a group of modern-day adolescents in a Greco-Roman mythological setting. Since then, Riordan has written The Heroes of Olympus, a sequel to the Percy Jackson series; The Kane Chronicles, a trilogy of similar premise focusing on Egyptian mythology; and Magnus Chase and the Gods of Asgard, a trilogy of similar premise focusing on Norse mythology. Riordan also helped Scholastic Press develop The 39 Clues series and its spinoffs, and penned its first book, The Maze of Bones. In 2021, he published Daughter of the Deep. His fourth spin-off series set in the Percy Jackson universe, The Nico di Angelo Adventures, began on May 2, 2023, with the release of The Sun and the Star, co-written with author Mark Oshiro. Originally planned as a standalone novel, positive critical reception led to the publishing of a sequel The Court of the Dead in 2025.

20th Century Fox adapted the first two books of his Percy Jackson series as part of a film series, which Riordan was not involved with. Riordan currently serves as a co-creator and an executive producer on the television series adaption of his Percy Jackson series that was released on Disney+ in 2023 and for which he won two Emmy Awards. Riordan's books have also spawned other related media, such as graphic novels and short story collections.

== Life and career ==
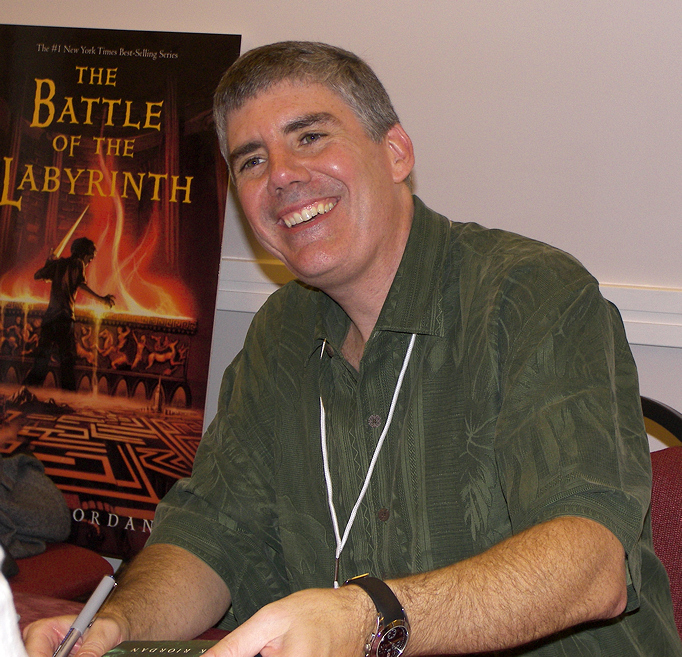
Riordan at the 2007 Texas Book Festival with advance publicity for The Battle of the Labyrinth

Rick Riordan was born and raised in San Antonio, Texas. Riordan's family came from Cork, Ireland. He graduated from Alamo Heights High School, and first attended the music program at North Texas State University, wanting to be a guitarist. He transferred to the University of Texas at Austin and studied English and History. He received his teaching certification in those subjects from the University of Texas at San Antonio. He taught English and Social Studies for eight years at Presidio Hill School in San Francisco. In 2021, Riordan completed an online master's degree in Gaelic literature offered by the University College Cork.

Rick married Rebecca "Becky" Klahn in 1985 on the couple's shared birthday. They have two sons, Haley and Patrick. They moved from San Antonio to Boston in June 2013, in conjunction with older son Haley starting college in Boston.

Riordan has created several successful book series. Tres Navarre, an adult mystery series about a Texas private eye, won the Shamus, Anthony, and Edgar Awards.

He conceived the idea for the Percy Jackson series as bedtime stories about ancient Greek heroes for his son Haley. Haley had been diagnosed with ADHD and dyslexia, inspiring Riordan to make the titular protagonist hyperactive and dyslexic. Riordan published the first novel in the series, The Lightning Thief, in 2005. Four sequels followed, with the last, The Last Olympian, in 2009. Prior to Percy Jackson, Riordan had written the Tres Navarres series, a series of mystery novels for adult readers.

His Percy Jackson & the Olympians series features the titular twelve-year-old who discovers he is the modern-day son of the ancient Greek god Poseidon. 20th Century Fox purchased the film rights and released two feature film adaptations between 2010 and 2013. Following the success of Percy Jackson, Riordan created The Kane Chronicles, which features a modern-day Egyptian pantheon and two new sibling protagonists, Sadie and Carter Kane. Riordan also created a sequel series to Percy Jackson, The Heroes of Olympus.

Riordan also helped create the children's book series The 39 Clues. He authored several of its books, including The Maze of Bones, which topped The New York Times Best Seller list on September 28, 2008. He also wrote the introduction to the Puffin Classics edition of Roger Lancelyn Green's Tales of the Greek Heroes, in which he states that the book influenced him to write his Greek mythology series.

In 2022, Riordan co-wrote the pilot for the Percy Jackson and the Olympians TV series on Disney+ and serves as an executive producer for the show. Disney had earlier acquired Fox in 2019, allowing it to gain the rights to adapt the Percy Jackson novels. He won an Emmy Award as an executive producer when the show's first season won Outstanding Young Teen Series, and a second Emmy as a writer when the pilot episode won Outstanding Writing for a Young Teen Program at the 3rd Children's and Family Emmy Awards.

== Mythology ==
Riordan's works of children's literature center around an adaptation of mythology for modern readers and for children. He has used Greek, Roman, Egyptian, and Norse and combinations thereof in a total of five separate novel series. The mythology used in his works possesses elements unique to his series, but has a largely historical basis. Some of its characteristics include an emphasis on human-divine interaction and a preference for anglicized names. Examples include:

- Greco-Roman mythology: Camp Half-Blood Chronicles
  - Percy Jackson & the Olympians
  - The Heroes of Olympus
  - The Trials of Apollo
  - The Nico di Angelo Adventures
- Egyptian mythology: The Kane Chronicles
- Norse mythology: Magnus Chase and the Gods of Asgard

Riordan's sources for the mythology used in his books are surmised from isolated comments on the subject during various interviews, as he has never released a list of any kind. These sources begin with the myths and the derivations thereof that he was exposed to as a child. Unnamed "novels on Norse mythology", suggested to him by a teacher who noticed his interest in The Lord of the Rings, were his first introduction to mythology and continue to influence his writing today. The author also claims to have read such notable classics as The Iliad and The Odyssey, and to use his "general knowledge" of a given mythology as a basis for his stories. As far as Greek mythology is concerned, Riordan has stated that Tales of the Greek Heroes by Roger Lancelyn Green—called by its author a "retelling of the Greek myths... based on multitudinous sources"—was one of his first introductions to that type of myth, and is in part responsible for his decision to interpret myths in his own books. Finally, Riordan has stated that he uses modern sources such as The Theoi Project for fact-checking purposes, as needed.

None of his novels include a list of references. Percy Jackson's Greek Gods and Percy Jackson's Greek Heroes alone possess "Background Reading" sections, listing sources such as Robert Fagles's translation of The Aeneid and web sites such as the Encyclopedia Mythica.

== Awards ==
Rick Riordan has been the most-awarded Goodreads Choice Award winner since surpassing Stephen King in 2020. Riordan was the recipient of the Goodreads Choice Award in Middle Grade and Children's category every year from 2011 to 2021, collecting 11 awards so far.

Year	Award	Category	Recipient	Result	Ref.
1998	Shamus Award	Best First PI Novel	Big Red Tequila	Won	
1998	Anthony Award	Best Paperback Original	Big Red Tequila	Won	
1999	Edgar Award	Best Paperback Original	The Widower's Two-Step	Won	
2002	Saint Mary's Hall Master Teacher Award			Awarded	
2008	Mark Twain Award		The Lightning Thief	Won	
2009	Rebecca Caudill Young Readers' Book Award		The Lightning Thief	Won	
2009	Mark Twain Award		The Sea of Monsters	Won	
2010	School Library Journal's Best Book List		The Red Pyramid	on the list	
2011	CBC's Children's Choice Book Award	5th–6th Grade Book of the Year	The Red Pyramid	Won	
2011	CBC's Children's Choice Book Award	Author of the Year	The Lost Hero	Won	
2011	Wyoming Soaring Eagle Book Award		The Last Olympian	Won	
2011	Milner Award		Percy Jackson & the Olympians series	Won	
2011	Goodreads Choice Award	Middle Grade and Children's	The Son of Neptune	Won	
2012	Indian Paintbrush Book Award		The Red Pyramid	Won	
2012	Goodreads Choice Award	Middle Grade and Children's	The Mark of Athena	Won	
2012	Geffen Award	Best Translated Fantasy Book	The Son of Neptune	Won	
2013	Magic Pearl Award	Avid Readers	The Mark of Athena	Won	
2013	Goodreads Choice Award	Middle Grade and Children's	The House of Hades	Won	
2014	Magic Pearl Award	Avid Readers	The House of Hades	Won	
2014	Goodreads Choice Award	Middle Grade and Children's	The Blood of Olympus	Won	
2015	Goodreads Choice Award	Middle Grade and Children's	The Sword of Summer	Won	
2016	Goodreads Choice Award	Middle Grade and Children's	The Hidden Oracle	Won	
2016	Geffen Award	Best Translated YA Book	The Blood of Olympus	Won	
2017	Stonewall Book Award	Children's Literature	The Hammer of Thor	Won	
2017	Dragon Award	Best Young Adult / Middle-Grade Novel	The Hammer of Thor	Won	
2017	Goodreads Choice Award	Middle Grade and Children's	The Ship of the Dead	Won	
2017	Geffen Award	Best Translated YA Book	The Hidden Oracle	Won	
2018	Goodreads Choice Award	Middle Grade and Children's	The Burning Maze	Won	
2018	Geffen Award	Best Translated YA Book	The Dark Prophecy	Won	
2019	Goodreads Choice Award	Middle Grade and Children's	The Tyrant's Tomb	Won	
2019	Geffen Award	Best Translated YA Book	The Ship of the Dead	Won	
2020	Magic Pearl Award	Dreamers	The Tyrant's Tomb	Won	
2020	Goodreads Choice Award	Middle Grade and Children's	The Tower of Nero	Won	
2021	Magic Pearl Award	Masters	The Tower of Nero	Won	
2021	Goodreads Choice Award	Middle Grade and Children's	Daughter of the Deep	Won	
2022–2023	Junior Tome It List	Middle Grade Literature	Daughter of the Deep	on the list	
2024	Geffen Award	Best Young Adult Book	The Chalice of the Gods	Won	
2025	Children's and Family Emmy Awards	Outstanding Young Teen Series	Percy Jackson and the Olympians	Won	
2025	Children's and Family Emmy Awards	Outstanding Writing for a Young Teen Series	Percy Jackson and the Olympians: "I Accidentally Vaporize My Pre-Algebra Teacher"	Won	

== Rick Riordan Presents ==
In September 2016, Disney-Hyperion announced a new Rick Riordan imprint. The imprint is called "Rick Riordan Presents" and was launched in March 2018. It is headed by Riordan's editor, Stephanie Owens Lurie.

Lurie said that Riordan had been approached about an imprint several years ago but initially dismissed the idea because of his heavy workload. Later, he reported back that he had been "toying with the idea" and was "willing to go forward with a publishing line that was not a brand extension for his own work but a platform for Riordan to bring other great writers to the attention of his vast and loyal audience." She also said that the imprint planned to launch with two then-undetermined books. "The point of making this announcement now is to get the word out about what we're looking for."

The imprint does not publish books written by Riordan, "whose role [is] closer to curator." In an interview with the Iowa Gazette, Riordan said, "Instead of me writing all of the mythologies we are going to look for authors who already are writing about that stuff. If I feel like I can recommend them [to my readers] ... we're going to have them out here in the spotlight." A focus will be placed on "diverse, mythology-based fiction by new, emerging, and under-represented authors". Lurie expressed hopes that the imprint would help satisfy Riordan fans without asking the author to write more than his usual two books a year.

== Publications ==
=== Camp Half-Blood Chronicles ===
==== Percy Jackson & the Olympians ====
===== Original Series =====
Year	Title
2005	The Lightning Thief
2006	The Sea of Monsters
2007	The Titan's Curse
2008	The Battle of the Labyrinth
2009	The Last Olympian

===== The Senior Year Adventures =====
Year	Title
2023	The Chalice of the Gods
2024	Wrath of the Triple Goddess

===== Related books =====
Year	Title	Notes
2009	The Demigod Files	
2010	The Ultimate Guide	In collaboration with Antonio Caparo, Philip Chidlow, and Keven Hays
2013	Percy Jackson and the Singer of Apollo	Short story published in Guys Read
2014	Percy Jackson's Greek Gods	Illustrated by John Rocco
2015	Percy Jackson's Greek Heroes	Illustrated by John Rocco
2017	The Percy Jackson Coloring Book	Artwork by Keith Robinson
2018	The Lightning Thief: Illustrated Edition	Illustrated by John Rocco

==== The Heroes of Olympus ====
Year	Title
2010	The Lost Hero
2011	The Son of Neptune
2012	The Mark of Athena
2013	The House of Hades
2014	The Blood of Olympus

===== Related books =====
Year	Title	Notes
2012	The Demigod Diaries	
2015	Demigods of Olympus	Interactive ebook

==== The Trials of Apollo ====
Year	Title
2016	The Hidden Oracle
2017	The Dark Prophecy
2018	The Burning Maze
2019	The Tyrant's Tomb
2020	The Tower of Nero

===== Related books =====
Year	Title
2017	Camp Half-Blood Confidential
2020	Camp Jupiter Classified

==== The Nico di Angelo Adventures ====
(Co written with Mark Oshiro)

Year	Title
2023	The Sun and the Star
2025	The Court of the Dead

=== The Kane Chronicles ===
Year	Title
2010	The Red Pyramid
2011	The Throne of Fire
2012	The Serpent's Shadow

==== Related books ====
Year	Title
2012	Survival Guide
2018	Brooklyn House Magician's Manual

=== Demigods and Magicians ===
Published individually first, then as an anthology titled Demigods and Magicians in 2016.

Year	Title
2013	The Son of Sobek
2014	The Staff of Serapis
2015	The Crown of Ptolemy

=== Magnus Chase and the Gods of Asgard ===
Year	Title
2015	The Sword of Summer
2016	The Hammer of Thor
2017	The Ship of the Dead

==== Related books ====
Year	Title	Notes
2016	Hotel Valhalla: Guide to the Norse Worlds	
2018	The Magnus Chase Coloring Book	Artwork by Keith Robinson
2018	9 From the Nine Worlds	

=== Camp Half-Blood ===
Year	Title	Notes
2026	The Wild Zone	Co written with Annabelle Oh
2027	The Rite of Aphrodite	Co written with Kyle Lukoff

=== Tres Navarre ===
Year	Title
1997	Big Red Tequila
1998	The Widower's Two-Step
2001	The Last King of Texas
2002	The Devil Went Down to Austin
2004	Southtown
2005	Mission Road
2008	Rebel Island

=== The 39 Clues ===
Year	Title	Notes
2008	The Maze of Bones	
2010	Introduction to The 39 Clues: The Black Book of Buried Secrets	
2011	Vespers Rising	In collaboration with Peter Lerangis, Gordon Korman, and Jude Watson

=== Graphic novels ===
==== Percy Jackson & the Olympians ====
Year	Title	Notes
2010	The Lightning Thief Graphic Novel	In collaboration with Robert Venditti, Nate Powell, and Jose Villarrubia
2013	The Sea of Monsters Graphic Novel	In collaboration with Robert Venditti, Attila Futaki, and Tamas Gaspar
2013	The Titan's Curse Graphic Novel	In collaboration with Robert Venditti, Attila Futaki, and Gregory Guilhaumond
2018	The Battle of Labyrinth Graphic Novel	In collaboration with Robert Venditti, Orpheus Collar and Antoine Dode
2019	The Last Olympian Graphic Novel	In collaboration with Robert Venditti, Orpheus Collar and Antoine Dode

==== The Kane Chronicles ====
Year	Title	Notes
2012	The Red Pyramid Graphic Novel	Adapted by Orpheus Collar
2015	The Throne of Fire Graphic Novel	Adapted by Orpheus Collar
2017	The Serpent's Shadow Graphic Novel	Adapted by Orpheus Collar

==== The Heroes of Olympus ====
Year	Title	Notes
2014	The Lost Hero Graphic Novel	In collaboration with Robert Venditti, Nate Powell, and Orpheus Collar
2017	The Son of Neptune Graphic Novel	In collaboration with Robert Venditti, Antoine Dode, and Orpheus Collar
2023	The Mark of Athena Graphic Novel	In collaboration with Robert Venditti and Orpheus Collar
2024	The House of Hades Graphic Novel	In collaboration with Robert Venditti and Orpheus Collar

=== Standalone novels ===
Year	Title
2004	Cold Springs
2021	Daughter of the Deep

=== Other ===
Year(s)	Introduction to	Notes
2009	the anthology Tales of the Greek Heroes	Written by Roger Lancelyn Green
2009, 2013	the essay collection Demigods and Monsters	
