= Karpos =

Demigod in Greek mythology

In Roman and Greek mythology, Carpus (/ˈkɑːrpɒs/; Ancient Greek: Καρπός, romanized: Karpos, lit. 'fruit') is a minor character, son of Zephyrus the west wind-god. Carpus drowned in a river, causing his distressed lover Kalamos to end his life as well.

== Etymology ==
The word Karpos derives from the Proto-Indo-European language root *kerp-. Cognates can be found in many Indo-European languages including modern English in words such as "harvest" (via Germanic), "carpet", "excerpt" and "scarce" (via Latin).

== Family ==
According to Servius, Carpus was the son of Zephyrus, the god of the west wind, by the nymph Hora (or a Hora, season goddess).

== Mythology ==
Carpus's only myth is related in the Dionysiaca, a fifth-century epic by Nonnus. Carpus fell in love with another youth, Calamus, who was the son of a river-god Meander. However, while the two were competing in a swimming contest, the wind drove a wave into Carpus's face and he drowned. In his grief, Calamus allowed himself to also drown. He was then transformed into a water reed, whose rustling in the wind was interpreted as a sigh of lamentation, while Carpus became "the fruit of the earth". Servius writes that Calamus blamed his father for Carpus's death, so he ran away and prayed to Zeus, who responded by transforming both of them. When rustled in the wind, those reeds would always give out a sound of lamentation.

== Symbolism ==
It has been suggested that Carpus is actually supposed to be the son of Chloris/Flora, the flower goddess that Zephyrus abducted and made his wife, instead of some Hora.

In more recent times, some scholars misread the words of Servius and Nonnus, thus a misinterpretation arose about the story of drowning with Calamus rather being about Carpo, the Season goddess, instead of the male youth Carpus.

== See also ==
- Adonis
- Anethus
- Mecon

== Bibliography ==
- Beekes, Robert S. P. (2009). Lucien van Beek (ed.). Etymological Dictionary of Greek. Leiden Indo-European Etymological Dictionary Series. Vol. 1. Leiden, the Netherlands: Brill Publications. ISBN 978-90-04-17420-7.
- Forbes Irving, Paul M. C. (1990). Metamorphosis in Greek Myths. Oxford, New York, Toronto: Oxford University Press, Clarendon Press. ISBN 0-19-814730-9.
- Guirand, Felix; Graves, Robert (December 16, 1987). New Larousse Encyclopedia of Mythology. Translated by Richard Aldington; Delano Ames. Crescent Books. ISBN 0517004046.
- Lemprière, John (1826). A Classical Dictionary: Containing a Copious Account of All the Proper Names Mentioned in Ancient Authors, with the Value of Coins, Weights, and Measures, Used Among the Greeks and Romans, and a Chronological Table. London, UK: T. Cadell.
- Licht, Hans (2000). Dawson, Lawrence H. (ed.). Sexual Life In Ancient Greece. Translated by J. H. Freese. London, New York: Routledge. ISBN 978-0-7103-0702-6.
- Maurus Servius Honoratus, In Vergilii carmina comentarii. Servii Grammatici qui feruntur in Vergilii carmina commentarii; recensuerunt Georgius Thilo et Hermannus Hagen. Georgius Thilo. Leipzig. B. G. Teubner. 1881. Online version at the Perseus Digital Library.
- Nonnus, Dionysiaca; translated by Rouse, W H D, III Books XXXVI-XLVIII. Loeb Classical Library No. 346, Cambridge, Massachusetts, Harvard University Press; London, William Heinemann Ltd. 1940. Internet Archive.
