= Middle grade literature =

Literature for children between the ages of 8 and 12

Middle grade literature is literature intended for children between the ages of 8 and 12. While these books are sometimes grouped together with books for other age bands and collectively called "children's books", middle grade is distinct from picture books, early or easy readers, and chapter books, all of which are intended for younger audiences. Most of the winners of the Newbery Medal have been middle grade books.

The category beyond middle grade is young adult, which is intended for readers between the ages of 12 and 18. In addition to differences in word count and the age of the protagonists, middle grade and young adult differ in content. Middle grade literature does not include profanity, sexual activity or romantic behavior beyond kissing, or realistic violence or any form of violence beyond fantasy violence, and tends to focus on the characters' friends, family, and immediate surroundings.

Examples of middle grade fiction include Charlotte's Web by E. B. White, the Percy Jackson & the Olympians series by Rick Riordan, and the early Harry Potter books.
