= The Sun and the Star =

2023 novel by Rick Riordan and Mark Oshiro

From the World of Percy Jackson The Sun and the Star A Nico di Angelo Adventure
- Original Disney-Hyperion hardcover
- Authors: Rick Riordan; Mark Oshiro
- Audio read by: A.J. Beckles
- Cover artist: Khadijah Khatib
- Language: American English; British English; More languages: Italian; Spanish; German; French; Thai; Dutch; Czech; Danish; Finnish; Catalan; Brazilian Portuguese; Taiwanese Mandarin; Israeli Hebrew; Polish; Bulgarian; Turkish
- Series: The Nico di Angelo Adventures
- Release number: 1
- Genres: Children's fantasy; Action fiction; Adventure fiction; Middle grade fiction; Classical mythology; More genres: Greek mythology; Roman mythology; Gay children's fiction; Bisexual middle grade fiction; Children's fiction
- Publisher: Disney-Hyperion; Puffin Books; More publishers: Mondadori; Montena; Carlsen; Albin Michel; Poche Jeunesse; Enter Books; Van Goor; Fragment; Otava; Intrinseca; Yuan-Liou; Kinneret; Egmont; Voxi; Dex Yayinevi; Wydawnictwo Galeria Ksiazki
- Publication date: May 2, 2023 (English) More dates: May 2, 2023 (Dutch); May 9, 2023 (Polish); May 23, 2023 (Italian); May 27, 2023 (Bulgarian); June 1, 2023 (Spanish; June 1, 2023 (Catalan); July 3, 2023 (Portuguese); August 30, 2023 (Mandarin); October 20, 2023 (German); November 15, 2023 (French); February 5, 2024 (Turkish); February 15, 2024 (Czech); April 18, 2024 (Danish); May 22, 2024 (Hebrew); October 10, 2024 (Thai); October 14, 2024 (Finnish); October 23, 2024 (French)
- Publication place: United States; United Kingdom; More countries: Italy; Spain; Germany; France; Thailand; Netherlands; Czech Republic; Denmark; Finland; Brazil; Taiwan; Israel; Poland; Bulgaria; Turkey
- Media type: Hardcover, Paperback, Audiobook, Ebook, Audio CD, Pocket edition
- ISBN: 9781368081153
- Preceded by: The Tower of Nero (in The Trials of Apollo series)
- Followed by: The Court of the Dead
- Website: The Sun and the Star | Rick Riordan

From the World of Percy Jackson: The Sun and the Star: A Nico di Angelo Adventure, commonly known as The Sun and the Star, is a 2023 American children's fantasy novel based on Greek and Roman mythology. It was co-written by American authors Rick Riordan and Mark Oshiro. The book is a sequel to the 2020 novel The Tower of Nero in The Trials of Apollo series, and is the first book in The Nico di Angelo Adventures series. The novel follows the demigods and heroes, Nico di Angelo and Will Solace, the sons of the Greek gods Hades and Apollo, respectively, as the boys follow a prophecy on a quest into the deep dark abyss of Tartarus, underneath the Greek underworld, to rescue an old friend of the boys, commonly known as Bob, who is, in fact, the Greek Titan Iapetus.

The Sun and the Star was originally published in American English by Disney-Hyperion in the United States and in British English by Puffin Books in the United Kingdom. The English language version novel was released on May 2, 2023, and immediately became the number one bestseller on The New York Times Best Seller list for Children’s Middle Grade books, (Note: Reflecting sales for the week that ended on May 6, 2023, as listed in The New York Times Book Review for the week that ended on May 21, 2023.) the American Booksellers Association IndieBound Best Seller List for Early & Middle Grade Readers, (Note: Reflecting sales for the week that ended on May 7, 2023, as listed in IndieBound for the week that ended on May 10, 2023.) the Publishers Weekly Best Seller List for Children's Fiction, (Note: Reflecting sales for the week that ended on May 6, 2023, as listed in Publishers Weekly for the week that ended on May 15, 2023.) and The Globe and Mail Bestseller List for Juvenile books. (Note: Reflecting sales for the week that ended on May 13, 2023, as listed in The Globe and Mail for the week that ended on May 12, 2023.) The book was listed on The New York Times Best Seller list for Children’s Middle Grade books for a total of 73 weeks, (Note: Reflecting sales for the week that ended on September 28, 2024, as listed in The New York Times Book Review for the week that ended on October 13, 2024.) the American Booksellers Association IndieBound Best Seller List for Early & Middle Grade Readers for a total of 44 weeks, (Note: Reflecting sales for the week that ended on March 3, 2024, as listed in IndieBound for the week that ended on March 6, 2024.) the Publishers Weekly Best Seller List for Children's Fiction for a total of 33 weeks, (Note: Reflecting sales for the week that ended on December 23, 2023, as listed in Publishers Weekly for the week that ended on January 1, 2024.) and The Globe and Mail Bestseller List for Juvenile books for a total of 9 weeks. (Note: Reflecting sales for the week that ended on July 8, 2023, as listed in The Globe and Mail for the week that ended on July 7, 2023.) The book was the number one overall bestseller on the American Booksellers Association IndieBound Best Seller List for Early & Middle Grade Readers for the entire year of 2023. (Note: Reflecting sales for sales for the year of January 1 through November 26, 2023, as listed in IndieBound on December 7, 2023.)

The Sun and the Star was awarded the Common Sense Selection Seal for Families by Common Sense Media, listed as a Best Middle-Grade Fantasy of 2023 by Kirkus Reviews, and either simultaneously or subsequently translated into sixteen different languages. The Sun and the Star was originally intended to be a standalone book, but the success of the novel led to the announcement of a sequel, The Court of the Dead. It was released on September 23, 2025.

== Plot ==
Two months after the defeat of Nero and Python, the Oracle of Delphi (Rachel Elizabeth Dare) provides the prophecy for the demigods and heroes, Nico di Angelo and Will Solace, the sons of the Greek Gods Hades and Apollo, respectively, as the boys follow the prophecy on a quest into the deep dark abyss of Tartarus, underneath the Greek underworld, to rescue an old friend of the boys, commonly known as Bob, who is, in fact, the Greek Titan Iapetus.

Making their way into the Underworld through the Door of Orpheus, which Nico and Percy had previously used, the two demigods are immediately set upon by the demon of nightmares, Epiales, who reveals that their mother is after Nico before Will manages to kill the demon using his newly-discovered power to emit light. Nico and Will seek the help of the troglodytes, who agree to lead them to a shortcut to Tartarus. But first, they pass the farm of Menoetes, who only agrees not to tell Hades about their quest in exchange for some stolen fruit from Persephone's garden. Although the heist is successful, Will encounters Persephone herself, who offers advice on his struggles to understand Nico, suggesting that Will embraces his own inner darkness rather than rejecting it, before gifting Will the stolen pomegranates.

Pleased with their success, Menoetes reveals that Bob, while reforming from dying while helping Percy and Annabeth, was captured by the primordial goddess of night, Nyx, who seeks to force Bob to go back to being Iapetus despite Bob's continuous rejection of his past. Nico reveals that he had encountered Nyx while traveling through Tartarus before getting captured by the giants and she took an interest in him, realizing that Nyx is using Bob as bait to get at Nico. The trogs lead the demigods to the River Acheron, where the nymph Gorgyra agrees to help them in exchange for Nico and Will sharing their story with her.

Using Gorgyra's canoe, Nico and Will descend into Tartarus where the power of the river forces them to confront their insecurities and differences of opinion, particularly on the nature of the Underworld. Locating Bob's pet saber-toothed skeleton cat, Small Bob, the demigods discover that Percy and Annabeth's giant friend Damasen is still reforming and can't help them before finally reaching Nyx's home, the Mansion of Night, where Bob is imprisoned in a continuous regeneration cycle. By combining their powers, Nico and Will free Bob before Nyx arrives with Nemesis, Hypnos, a reformed Epiales, and an army of monsters to cut off their escape.

Nyx reveals that she has created cacodemons out of manifestations of Nico's darkness and urges him to accept his darkness and stay in Tartarus, where the goddess believes he belongs. With the encouragement of Will and Bob, Nico fights back against Nyx's manipulations, embracing the fact that he is more than just his darkness, while Will accepts his own darkness to tap into Apollo's plague powers to fight Nyx. Taking control of the cacodemons, Nico decides to release them, symbolically letting go of his demons and fulfilling the part of the prophecy that he would have to leave something of equal value behind. Nemesis, Hypnos, and Epiales turn on Nyx and restrain her long enough for the group to get on the Acheron, which Nyx can't cross. To Nico's surprise, the cacodemons, which he renames Cocoa Puffs, decide to join them of their own free will.

As Bob sails the group back up the Acheron to the Underworld, Nico is visited in a dream by Hades and the spirits of his mother, Maria, and sister, Bianca. Hades reveals that he had sent Nico the prophecy so that he would rescue Bob, and arranged this dream. Maria and Bianca express their love and pride in Nico, as does Hades, who admits that Percy's actions have made him rethink his behavior towards his son, particularly when Hades realizes that the quest has risked Nico losing someone else that he loves. Hades, Maria, and Bianca urge Nico to enjoy his future with Will and find happiness.

Returning to Camp Half-Blood, Bob declines an invitation to stay and decides to head west to figure out his future, looking forward to finally having the freedom to do so. Nico and Will adopt the Cocoa Puffs and contacts Piper McLean and her new girlfriend Shel to discuss their shared grief over the loss of Jason Grace. With a more hopeful outlook on life, Nico looks forward to what the future holds for him.

== Characters ==
- Niccolò di Angelo, commonly known as Nico di Angelo, is an Italian-born Greek demigod hero who is the son of the Greek God Hades and the Italian mortal Maria di Angelo. He is 10 years old in his first appearance in The Titan's Curse in the Percy Jackson & the Olympians series and 15 years old in his appearance in The Sun and the Star in The Nico di Angelo Adventures series. He is an Italian boy with black hair, dark brown eyes, and olive skin. He is the first openly gay character in the Camp Half-Blood Chronicles, a main character in the Percy Jackson & the Olympians series, The Heroes of Olympus series, and The Trials of Apollo series, respectively, and the protagonist and the title character of The Nico di Angelo Adventures series. He is the boyfriend of Will Solace.
- William Andrew Solace, commonly known as Will Solace, is an American-born Greek demigod hero who is the son of Greek God Apollo and the American mortal Naomi Solace. He is 11 years old in his first appearance in The Last Olympian in the Percy Jackson & the Olympians series and 16 years old in his appearance in The Sun and the Star in The Nico di Angelo Adventures series. He is an American boy with blond hair, light blue eyes, and white skin. He is the first openly bisexual character in the Camp Half-Blood Chronicles, a minor character in the Percy Jackson & the Olympians series and The Heroes of Olympus series, respectively, a main character in The Trials of Apollo series, and the deuteragonist of The Nico di Angelo Adventures series. He is the boyfriend of Nico di Angelo.
- Iapetus, commonly known as Bob the Titan, is a Greek Titan and the Lord of the West who is the father of Atlas. He is an antagonist of the short story Percy Jackson and the Sword of Hades in The Demigod Files supplementary book to Percy Jackson & the Olympians series, a main character in The House of Hades in The Heroes of Olympus series, and the tritagonist of The Sun and the Star in The Nico di Angelo Adventures series.
- Perseus Jackson, commonly known as Percy Jackson, is an American-born Greek demigod hero who is the son of the Greek God Poseidon and the American mortal Sally Jackson. He is 12 years old in his first appearance in The Lightning Thief in the Percy Jackson & the Olympians series and 18 years old in his appearance in The Sun and the Star in The Nico di Angelo Adventures. He is an American boy with jet black hair, sea green eyes, and white skin. He is the protagonist and the title character of the Percy Jackson & the Olympians series, a main character in The Heroes of Olympus series, and a minor character in The Trials of Apollo series and The Nico di Angelo Adventures series, respectively. He is the boyfriend of Annabeth Chase.
- Annabeth Chase is an American-born Greek demigod hero who is the daughter of the Greek God Athena and the American mortal Frederick Chase. She is 12 years old in her first appearance in The Lightning Thief in the Percy Jackson & the Olympians series and 18 years old in her appearance in The Sun and the Star in The Nico di Angelo Adventures series. She is an American girl with honey blonde, curly or wavy hair, and stormy gray eyes. She is the deuteragonist of the Percy Jackson & the Olympians series, a main character in The Heroes of Olympus series, and a minor character in The Trials of Apollo series and The Nico di Angelo Adventures series, respectively. She is the girlfriend of Percy Jackson.
- Rachel Elizabeth Dare is an American mortal who is the Oracle of Delphi. She is 15 years old in her first appearance in The Titan's Curse in the Percy Jackson & the Olympians series and 19 years old in her appearance in The Sun and the Star in The Nico di Angelo Adventures series. She is an American girl with red hair, green eyes, white skin. She is a minor character in the Percy Jackson & the Olympians series, The Heroes of Olympus series, The Trials of Apollo series, and The Nico di Angelo Adventures series, respectively.

== Background ==
The Sun and the Star was announced on October 6, 2021. Rick Riordan decided to collaborate writing the novel with Mark Oshiro, an author of middle grade fiction centered on characters who are LGBT+ children, to ensure the storyline would come across as authentic. Specific concerns were raised regarding Nico di Angelo and Will Solace, a young gay boy and a young bisexual boy, respectively, as well the romantic relationship between the boys. Riordan and Oshiro created the synopsis and manuscript together and received equal credit for the book.

On September 28, 2022, both the cover art and the release date were revealed. The cover art was illustrated by Malaysian artist Khadijah Khatib, and the release date for the hardcover version of the novel by both Disney-Hyperion in the United States and by Puffin Books in the United Kingdom was announced as May 2, 2023. Riordan also announced a book tour of the United States and Canada with co-author Oshiro to promote the novel.

== Publication history ==
=== Originals ===
The Sun and the Star was originally published in American English by Disney-Hyperion in the United States and in British English by Puffin Books in the United Kingdom, both on May 2, 2023.

=== Translations ===
The Sun and the Star has been translated 17 times. The list below provides translation languages, titles, publishers, and publication dates, sorted by publication date.

- Dutch: De zon en de ster by Van Goor on May 2, 2023
- Polish: Słońce i Gwiazda: Opowieść o Nicu di Angelo by Wydawnictwo Galeria Ksiazki on May 9, 2023
- Italian: Luce e tenebra: Dal mondo di Percy Jackson by Mondadori on May 23, 2023
- Bulgarian: Слънцето и Звездата: Една история за Нико ди Анджело by Egmont on May 27, 2023
- Spanish: La profecía del rayo y las estrellas: Del universo de Percy Jackson by Montena on June 1, 2023
- Catalan: La profecia del llamp i les estrelles: De l'univers de Percy Jackson by Montena on June 1, 2023
- Brazilian Portuguese: O Sol e a Estrela: Crônicas do Acampamento Meio-Sangue #17 by Intrinseca on July 3, 2023
- Taiwanese Mandarin: 波西傑克森：烈日星辰 by Yuan-Liou on August 30, 2023
- German: Nico und Will: Reise ins Dunkel by Carlsen on October 20, 2023
- French: Le Soleil et l'Etoile: Une aventure de Nico Di Angelo by Albin Michel on November 15, 2023
- Turkish: Güneş ve Yıldız: Percy Jackson Evreninden: Bir Nico Di Angelo Macerası by Dex Yayinevi in Turkey on February 5, 2024
- Czech: Slunce a hvězda: Dobrodružství Nika a Willa by Fragment and Voxi on February 15, 2024
- Danish: Solen og stjernen: Et Nico Di Angelo eventyr by Carlsen on April 18, 2024
- Israeli Hebrew: השמש והכוכב by Kinneret on May 22, 2024
- Thai: ดาราหลับฝันตะวันผจญ by Enter Books on October 10, 2024
- Finnish as Aurinko ja tähti: Nico di Angelon seikkailu by Otava on October 14, 2024
- French: Le Soleil et l'Etoile: Une aventure de Nico di Angelo by Poche Jeunesse on October 23, 2024

== Reception ==
=== Accolades ===
The Sun and the Star was awarded the Common Sense Selection Seal for Families by Common Sense Media, and listed as a Best Middle-Grade Fantasy of 2023 by Kirkus Reviews.

=== Bestseller lists ===
The Sun and the Star immediately became the number one bestseller on The New York Times Best Seller list for Children’s Middle Grade books, (Note: Reflecting sales for the week that ended on May 6, 2023, as listed in The New York Times Book Review for the week that ended on May 21, 2023.) continued to remain the number one bestseller on The New York Times Best Seller list for Children’s Middle Grade books for an initial period of 6 weeks, (Note: Reflecting sales for the week that ended on June 10, 2023, as listed in The New York Times Book Review for the week that ended on June 25, 2023) became the number one bestseller on The New York Times Best Seller list for Children’s Middle Grade books again for another period of 8 weeks, (Note: Reflecting sales for the week that ended on June 24, 2023, as listed in The New York Times Book Review for the week that ended on July 9, 2023) (Note: Reflecting sales for the week that ended on August 12, 2023, as listed in The New York Times Book Review for the week that ended on August 27, 2023) for a total of 14 weeks as the number one bestseller on The New York Times Best Seller list for Children’s Middle Grade books, (Note: Reflecting sales for the week that ended on May 6, 2023, as listed in The New York Times Book Review for the week that ended on May 21, 2023.) (Note: Reflecting sales for the week that ended on August 12, 2023, as listed in The New York Times Book Review for the week that ended on August 27, 2023) continued to be continuously listed non-stop in the top ten on The New York Times Best Seller list for Children’s Middle Grade books for 72 weeks, (Note: Reflecting sales for the week that ended on September 14, 2024, as listed in The New York Times Book Review for the week that ended on September 29, 2024.) and returned to the top ten on The New York Times Best Seller list for Children’s Middle Grade books again for another week, (Note: Reflecting sales for the week that ended on September 28, 2024, as listed in The New York Times Book Review for the week that ended on October 13, 2024.) for a total of 73 weeks on The New York Times Best Seller list for Children’s Middle Grade books. (Note: Reflecting sales for the week that ended on September 28, 2024, as listed in The New York Times Book Review for the week that ended on October 13, 2024.)

The Sun and the Star immediately became the number one bestseller on the American Booksellers Association IndieBound Best Seller List for Early & Middle Grade Readers, (Note: Reflecting sales for the week that ended on May 7, 2023, as listed in IndieBound for the week that ended on May 10, 2023.) continued to remain the number one bestseller on the American Booksellers Association IndieBound Best Seller List for Early & Middle Grade Readers for 9 weeks, (Note: Reflecting sales for the week that ended on July 2, 2023, as listed in IndieBound for the week that ended on July 5, 2023.) continued to be continuously listed non-stop on the American Booksellers Association IndieBound Best Seller List for Early & Middle Grade Readers for a total of 44 weeks, (Note: Reflecting sales for the week that ended on March 3, 2024, as listed in IndieBound for the week that ended on March 6, 2024.) and became the number one overall bestseller on the American Booksellers Association IndieBound Best Seller List for Early & Middle Grade Readers for the entire year of 2023. (Note: Reflecting sales for sales for the year of January 1 through November 26, 2023, as listed in IndieBound on December 7, 2023.)

The Sun and the Star immediately became the number one bestseller on the Publishers Weekly Bestseller List for Children's Fiction, (Note: Reflecting sales for the week that ended on May 6, 2023, as listed in Publishers Weekly for the week that ended on May 15, 2023.) and continued to be continuously listed non-stop on the Publishers Weekly Bestseller List for Children's Fiction for a total of 33 weeks. (Note: Reflecting sales for the week that ended on December 23, 2023, as listed in Publishers Weekly for the week that ended on January 1, 2024.)

The Sun and the Star immediately became the number one bestseller on The Globe and Mail Bestseller List for Juvenile books, (Note: Reflecting sales for the week that ended on May 13, 2023, as listed in The Globe and Mail for the week that ended on May 12, 2023.) and continued to be continuously listed non-stop on The Globe and Mail Bestseller List for Juvenile books for a total of 9 weeks. (Note: Reflecting sales for the week that ended on July 8, 2023, as listed in The Globe and Mail for the week that ended on July 7, 2023.)

=== Critical response ===
Sharon Rawlins of the School Library Journal starred The Sun and the Star, praised the novel as "a seamlessly written, action-packed story that’s also a sensitive, introspective character study", added that "fans who’ve been waiting for more of adorable couple Nico and Will won’t be disappointed", and recommended the book for children in third grade through seventh grade.

Mia Manansala of Booklist starred The Sun and the Star, praised the novel as a "perfect read for fans of Percy Jackson, as well as those who love modern, inclusive takes on classic mythology", and recommended the book for children in sixth grade through ninth grade.

Carrie Wheadon of Common Sense Media gave The Sun and the Star four out of five stars, praised the novel as an "exciting Percy Jackson spin-off" that "offers monster-filled adventures for fantasy fans and relationship goals for everyone", which "makes this read very worthwhile", and recommended the book for children ages 10 and up.

Kirkus Reviews starred The Sun and the Star, praised the novel as "a standout", stated that the "collaborative effort between Riordan and Oshiro maintains earlier Percy Jackson entries' glorious knack for mythical machinations, profoundly sharp conflicts, and contemporary humor", added that "this stellar tale centers a richly woven love story that shines with ease between two boys who are seemingly different from one another", and recommended the book for children ages 10 years old to 14 years old.

Publishers Weekly praised The Sun and the Star for "reprising the Greek myth–grounded books' goofy humor, high-stakes action, and whimsical worldbuilding", stated that "the collaborators weave in tender romance and emotionally complex ruminations on change, self-identity, and mental health, balancing adventure with heart and heft", and recommended the book for children ages 10 years old to 14 years old.

== Sequel ==
The Sun and the Star was originally intended to be a standalone book, but the success of the novel led to the announcement of a sequel, The Court of the Dead, which is the second book in The Nico di Angelo Adventures series, which was released on September 23, 2025.
