= The Court of the Dead =

2025 novel by Rick Riordan and Mark Oshiro

From the World of Percy Jackson The Court of the Dead A Nico di Angelo Adventure
- Disney-Hyperion Hardcover
- Authors: Rick Riordan; Mark Oshiro
- Audio read by: AJ Beckles; Mieko Gavia
- Cover artist: Khadijah Khatib
- Language: American English; British English; More languages: Italian; Spanish; German; French; Thai; Dutch; Brazilian Portuguese; Polish; Turkish
- Series: The Nico di Angelo Adventures
- Release number: 2
- Genres: Children's fantasy; Action fiction; Adventure fiction; Middle grade fiction; Classical mythology; More genres: Greek mythology; Roman mythology; Gay children's fiction; Bisexual middle grade fiction; Children's fiction
- Publisher: Disney-Hyperion; Puffin Books; More publishers: Mondadori; Montena; Carlsen; Albin Michel; Enter Books; Van Goor; Intrinseca; Dex Yayinevi; Wydawnictwo Galeria Ksiazki
- Publication date: September 23, 2025 (English) More dates: September 23, 2025 (Dutch); September 23/24, 2025 (Italian); October 14, 2025 (Polish); November 11, 2025 (Turkish); December 2, 2025 (Portuguese); December 4, 2025 (Thai); March 3, 2026 (Spanish; April 1, 2026 (French); May 28, 2026 (German)
- Publication place: United States; United Kingdom; More countries: Italy; Spain; Germany; France; Thailand; Netherlands; Brazil; Poland; Turkey
- Media type: Hardcover, Paperback, Audiobook, Ebook
- Pages: 448 (Disney Hardcover); 448 (Puffin Hardcover); More editions: 438 (Puffin Paperback); 454 (Disney Kindle); 438 (Puffin Kindle); 12:58 (Disney Audible); 12:53 (Puffin Audible); 480 (Mondadori Hardcover); 466 (Mondadori Kindle); 15 (Mondadori Audible); 496 (Van Goor Paperback); 496 (Van Goor Ebook; 499 (Intrinseca Paperback); 501 (Intrinseca Kindle); 416 (Dex Paperback); 536 (Galeria Paperback)
- ISBN: 9781368109116
- Preceded by: The Sun and the Star
- Website: The Court of the Dead | Rick Riordan

From the World of Percy Jackson: The Court of the Dead: A Nico di Angelo Adventure, commonly known as The Court of the Dead, is a 2025 American action-adventure middle grade fantasy novel based on Greco-Roman classical mythology co-written by American authors Rick Riordan and Mark Oshiro. The book is a sequel to the 2023 novel The Sun and the Star, and is the second book in The Nico di Angelo Adventures series. The story follows the demigods and heroes, Nico di Angelo and Will Solace, the sons of the Greek gods Hades and Apollo, respectively, as the boys join Hazel Levesque, the daughter of the Roman god Pluto, at Camp Jupiter, on the West Coast of the United States, to help her manage a situation that the boys inadvertently brought about.

The Sun and the Star was originally intended to be a standalone novel. However, after the book's critical and commercial success, Riordan and Oshiro began work on a sequel. The Court of the Dead was announced on February 28, 2025, on Riordan's website.

The Court of the Dead was originally published in American English by Disney-Hyperion in the United States and in British English by Puffin Books in the United Kingdom. The English language version novel was released on September 23, 2025, and immediately became the number one bestseller on The New York Times Best Seller list for Children’s Middle Grade books, (Note: Reflecting sales for the week that ended on October 12, 2025, as listed in The New York Times Book Review for the week that ended on September 27, 2025.) the USA Today Best Seller List for Juvenile Fiction, (Note: Reflecting sales for the week that ended on October 1, 2025, as listed in USA Today for the week that ended on October 1, 2025.) the Publishers Weekly Best Seller List for Children's Fiction, (Note: Reflecting sales for the week that ended on September 27, 2025;, as listed in Publishers Weekly for the week that ended on October 6, 2025.) the American Booksellers Association IndieBound Best Seller List for Early & Middle Grade Readers, (Note: Reflecting sales for the week that ended on September 28, 2025, as listed in IndieBound for the week that ended on October 1, 2025.) and The Globe and Mail Bestseller List for Juvenile books. (Note: Reflecting sales for the week that ended on October 4, 2025, as listed in The Globe and Mail for the week that ended on October 3, 2025.)

== Plot ==
Three months after their quest to Tartarus, the demigods and heroes, Nico di Angelo and Will Solace—the sons of the Greek gods Hades and Apollo, respectively—as the most veteran campers currently in attendance at Camp Half-Blood, have been helping Dionysus and Chiron deal with a massive influx of new campers. The two receive a sudden summons to Camp Jupiter from Hazel Levesque, where they learn that their recent journey to Tartarus has caused several monsters, or "mythics," as they prefer to be called, to seek sanctuary at the Roman camp, seeking to make a new life for themselves. These mythics are the Minotaur, now going by his real name of Asterion, Johan the blemmyae, Quinoa the karpos, Arielle the empousa, Orcus the gryphon and Semele the eidolon.

Nico and Will attempt to help the mythics settle in at Camp Jupiter, but have to deal with a great deal of backlash from the Roman legion who are used to hunting and being hunted by mythics. Things get off to a rocky start with Arielle being targeted by Savannah, a legacy who lost her family to empousa, Orcus struggling to adapt to the modern world, and Johan being the target of pranks and bullying due to his polite nature. However, Nico and Will eventually make progress with Orcus' struggles endearing him to some of the legion, Johan finding a job as a historian and archivist while befriending his tormentor and Quinoa quickly finding acceptance as a kindergarten teacher in New Rome.

Despite these successes, the mythics begin mysteriously vanishing one by one from Camp Jupiter following unsettling dreams about facing judgement. With the help of the Coco Puffs who help to see through the intruder's illusions, the legion is able to uncover the culprit as Laverna, a minor Roman goddess who leaves behind an ID badge as she flees. Following this clue, Nico, Will and Hazel discover that Laverna works for the Court of the Dead, a tribunal run by Pirithous, Tantalus and Mary Tudor who claim to be able to destroy a being completely and, having amassed an army of the dead, evil mythics and minor gods, wish to overthrow Hades and take control of the Underworld for themselves. Hazel is placed on trial and seemingly executed while Nico and Will escape. As they go, Hazel warns Nico not to believe what he has seen.

In reality, Hazel and hundreds of mythics are imprisoned in Golden Gate Park where Pirithous intends to use their presence to break the Mist, which is the veil separating the mystical world from the mortal world, and force Hades to the surface where the Court will put him on trial. Nico reaches out to Hades who is unable to interfere directly, but offers his son advice while discreetly leading Will's country singer mother Naomi to the park so that she can reveal the location to the demigods. Hades and Johan reveal that Pirithous is seeking revenge for Hades punishing him by trapping Pirithous in a rock when he and Theseus tried to steal Persephone. Hades eventually released Pirithous, believing that he had changed, only to have Pirithous come up with this revenge plot.

A strike team of demigods and the remaining mythics, carrying the Coco Puffs to sharpen their perception, attack Golden Gate Park as the Mist breaks, throwing everything into chaos. The Court only succeeds in summoning Dolus and Apate, two minor trickster gods who incinerate Mary and Tantalus. However, Pirithous and Kelli trap the two in the chains of Prometheus which Pirithous has been using to force gods to swear allegiance to him. Asterion organizes the escape of the mythics while Hazel kills Kelli. Nico, with Semele inhabiting his body to lend him her strength, manages to free Dolus and Apate with the Coco Puffs' help. The two gods restore the Mist, although they go overboard, resulting in more chaos before Semele brings them back in line. Pirithous attempts to escape in the camp van, but is run off of the road by Hazel and Arion and forced to release the minor gods from his service.

Drawn by the chaos, Hecate, the goddess of magic, arrives to deal with the aftermath. Hecate banishes Pirithous back to his punishment in the Underworld, erases the memories of the mortals who witnessed the events, and restores Semele – who is revealed to be a goddess who had faded – to physical form. At Hecate's request, Nico, Will and Hazel promise to ensure that the minor gods who worked for the Court get cabins at Camp Half-Blood and temples in New Rome.

Afterwards, most of the mythics settle in at Camp Jupiter aside from Orcus who decides to travel the world. The mythics become a part of the legion as an auxilia. Savannah decides to go on a quest with her friends Yazan and Deion as well as Arielle to hunt down the empousa who killed her family so that she can get closure. Returning to Camp Half-Blood, Nico and Will discover that Semele has reunited with Dionysus who is her son. Nico realizes that for the first time, he is truly happy, having finally found a home, family and someone to love.

== Characters ==
- Niccolò di Angelo, commonly known as Nico di Angelo, is an Italian-born Greek demigod hero who is the son of the Greek god Hades and the Italian mortal Maria di Angelo. He is 10 years old in his first appearance in The Titan's Curse in the Percy Jackson & the Olympians series and 15 years old in his appearance in The Court of the Dead in The Nico di Angelo Adventures series. He is an Italian boy with black hair, dark brown eyes, and olive skin. He is the first openly gay character in the Camp Half-Blood Chronicles, a main character in the Percy Jackson & the Olympians series, The Heroes of Olympus series, and The Trials of Apollo series, respectively, and the protagonist and the title character of The Nico di Angelo Adventures series. He is the boyfriend of Will Solace.
- William Andrew Solace, commonly known as Will Solace, is an American-born Greek demigod hero who is the son of the Greek god Apollo and the American mortal Naomi Solace. He is 13 years old in his first appearance in The Last Olympian in the Percy Jackson & the Olympians series and 16 years old in his appearance in The Court of the Dead in The Nico di Angelo Adventures series. He is an American boy with blond hair, light blue eyes, and white skin. He is the first openly bisexual character in the Camp Half-Blood Chronicles, a minor character in the Percy Jackson & the Olympians series and The Heroes of Olympus series, respectively, a main character in The Trials of Apollo series, and the deuteragonist of The Nico di Angelo Adventures series. He is the boyfriend of Nico di Angelo.
- Hazel Levesque is an American-born Roman demigod hero who is the daughter of the Roman god Pluto and the American mortal Marie Levesque. She is 13 years old in her first appearance in The Son of Neptune in The Heroes of Olympus series and 15 years old in her appearance in The Court of the Dead in The Nico di Angelo Adventures series. She is an American girl with cinnamon brown hair, amber eyes, and black skin. She is a main character in The Heroes of Olympus series, a minor character in The Trials of Apollo series, and the tritagonist of The Court of the Dead in The Nico di Angelo Adventures series.
- The Minotaur, named Asterion, is the son of Pasiphaë and the Cretan Bull. He is a monster with the head of a bull and the body of a human. He previously appeared as an antagonist in the Percy Jackson and the Olympians series. Following his defeat at Percy Jackson's hands in The Last Olympian and inspired by Nico and Will's actions in The Sun and the Star, Asterion has reclaimed his birth name and seeks to make amends.
- Arion is an immortal horse who occasionally acts as Hazel's steed. He previously appeared in The Heroes of Olympus and The Tyrant's Tomb.
- Arielle is an empousa seeking to find a better life.
- Semele was the Demigod daughter of Harmonia, a princess and the mother of the god Dionysus.
- Johan is a friendly blemmyae with an interest in archiving and history. After an attempt at bullying Johan with a prank, he is befriended by Lucius Silver.
- Orcus is a gryphon.
- Lavinia Asimov is the centurion of the fifth cohort and the Roman demigod daughter of Terpsichore, the Muse of Dance and Choral songs, who has a love for tap dancing. She previously appeared in The Tyrant's Tomb.
- Savannah is a Roman legacy and the great-granddaughter of Minerva who lost her parents to empousa recently. Savannah has developed a new method for the Iris Messaging used primarily by the Greeks throughout the series.
- Yazan is a Roman demigod son of Vesper, god of dusk, and a friend of Savannah's.
- Deion is a Roman demigod son of Aurora, goddess of the dawn, and a friend of Yazan's.
- Lucius Silver is a Roman demigod son of Mercury and a prankster who at first bullies and then befriends Johan.
- Naomi Solace is Will Solace's clear sighted mother, a former lover of Apollo and a famous country singer.
- Claudia and Janice are Roman demigods who previously appeared in Camp Jupiter Classified: A Probatio's Journal. They make a cameo appearance as the guards who greet Naomi Solace.
- Tantalus is a son of Zeus who is famous for feeding his children to the gods and his punishment for that crime. Previously appearing as the interim Activities Director in The Sea of Monsters, Tantalus returns as one of the judges on the Court of the Dead.
- Kelli is an empousa serving the Court of the Dead. She previously appeared in The Battle of the Labyrinth and The House of Hades as an enemy of Percy Jackson and Annabeth Chase.
- Hecate is the goddess of magic who previously appeared in The House of Hades and Wrath of the Triple Goddess.

== Release ==
=== Originals ===
The Court of the Dead was originally published in American English by Disney-Hyperion in the United States and in British English by Puffin Books in the United Kingdom, both on September 23, 2025.

=== Translations ===
The Court of the Dead was either simultaneously or subsequently translated into Dutch as Hof van de doden by Van Goor in Netherlands on September 23, 2025; Italian as La Corte dei Morti by Mondadori in Italy as a hardcover and as an ebook on Kindle on September 23, 2025 and as an audiobook on Audible on September 24, 2025; Polish as Trybunał Umarłych by Wydawnictwo Galeria Ksiazki in Poland on October 14, 2025; Turkish as Ölüler Mahkemesi: Percy Jackson Evreninden Bir Nico Di Angelo Macerası by DEX Kitap in Turkey on November 11, 2025; Brazilian Portuguese as O tribunal dos mortos: Uma aventura de Nico di Angelo by Intrinseca in Brazil on December 2, 2025; Spanish as La corte de la muerte by Montena in Spain on December 1, 2025; and Thai as พิพากษ์ลับดับวิญญาณ by Enter Books in Thailand on December 4, 2025.

The Court of the Dead is scheduled to be translated into French as Le Tribunal des morts - Une aventure de Nico Di Angelo by Albin Michel in France on April 1, 2026; and German as Nico und Will – Das Gericht der Toten by Carlsen as an ebook on Kindle and as Das Gericht der Toten: Nico und Will by Silberfisch as an audiobook on Audible, both in Germany, both on May 28, 2026.

== Reception ==
=== Bestseller lists ===
The Court of the Dead immediately became the number one bestseller on The New York Times Best Seller list for Children’s Middle Grade books, (Note: Reflecting sales for the week that ended on October 12, 2025, as listed in The New York Times Book Review for the week that ended on September 27, 2025.) the USA Today Best Seller List for Juvenile Fiction, (Note: Reflecting sales for the week that ended on October 1, 2025, as listed in USA Today for the week that ended on October 1, 2025.) the Publishers Weekly Best Seller List for Children's Fiction, (Note: Reflecting sales for the week that ended on September 27, 2025;, as listed in Publishers Weekly for the week that ended on October 6, 2025.) the American Booksellers Association IndieBound Best Seller List for Early & Middle Grade Readers, (Note: Reflecting sales for the week that ended on September 28, 2025, as listed in IndieBound for the week that ended on October 1, 2025.) and The Globe and Mail Bestseller List for Juvenile books. (Note: Reflecting sales for the week that ended on October 4, 2025, as listed in The Globe and Mail for the week that ended on October 3, 2025.)

=== Critical response ===
Carrie Wheadon of Common Sense Media gave The Court of the Dead four out of five stars, praised the novel as "full of fascinating characters and social-emotional learning" that "adds a depth you won't see in a lot of mythical adventures" and added that "kids going through tough times will feel seen by this book", and recommended the book for children ages 10 and up.

Bill Gowsell of Laughing Place praised The Court of the Dead as an "action-packed adventure that will leave readers wanting more" and praised the novel as "superior in intellect, heart, and meaning".

Better Reading featured The Court of the Dead as the book of week and praised novel as "a story that is not just epic and action-packed, but also full of depth, humour, and heart", and recommended the book for children ages 9 and up.

Jenny of Righter of Words stated that "The Court of the Dead is a blast", that "the themes are excellent and touching", and that "the humor and adventure is also great".
