= Ascalaphus =

Greek mythological character(s)

The name Ascalaphus (/əˈskæləfəs/; Ancient Greek: Ἀσκάλαφος, romanized: Askálaphos) is shared by two people in Greek mythology:

- Ascalaphus, son of Acheron and Orphne.
- Ascalaphus, son of Ares and Astyoche.
