= Sally Jackson (disambiguation) =

Sally Jackson is an academic.

Sally Jackson may also refer to:

- Sally Jackson (Percy Jackson), mother of Percy Jackson
- Sally Bundock (born Sally Jackson), news presenter
