= Anger Is a Gift =

2018 young adult novel by Mark Oshiro

- Author: Mark Oshiro
- Language: English
- Genre: Young adult fiction
- Publisher: Tor Teen
- English publication date: May 22, 2018
- Media type: Print
- ISBN: 9781250167026

Anger Is a Gift is a young adult novel by Mark Oshiro, published May 22, 2018 by Tor Teen.

Despite their youth, the students decide to organize and push back against the administration. When tensions hit a fever pitch and tragedy strikes, Moss must face a difficult choice: give in to fear and hate or realize that anger can actually be a gift.

== Plot summary ==
Anger Is a Gift follows Moss Jeffries, a Black queer teenager in Oakland, California, who is traumatized by his father's death at the hands of the police. As Moss struggles with anxiety, his school becomes increasingly militarized, targeting students of color with harsh security measures. After his friend Javier is injured during a protest, Moss and his friends rally against the oppressive system, realizing that their anger can be a powerful force for change. The novel explores themes of grief, racism, activism, and the strength of community in the fight for justice.

== Reception ==
Anger Is a Gift received starred reviews from School Library Journal and Kirkus, as well as positive reviews from The Bulletin of the Center for Children's Books and Publishers Weekly.

School Library Journal called the book "[p]art sweet love story, part social justice commentary," stating that "this title begs to be read and discussed. There are no good models of white ally-ship, and the title is stronger for this fact. In the same vein, the diversity of this title also makes it shine: sexual orientation, gender identity, religion, race, and ethnicity are all portrayed in Oshiro's inner-city Oakland setting."

Kirkus called it "[a] masterful debut rich with intersectional nuance and grass-roots clarity."

Anger Is a Gift has received the following accolades:

- Schneider Family Book Award for Teens (2019)
- Lambda Literary Award for LGBTQ Children's/Young Adult nominee (2019)

The book has also been included on the following "best of" lists:

- Kirkus Reviews' Best Books of 2018
- BuzzFeed's 24 Best YA Books of 2018
- Vulture's 38 Best LGBTQ YA Novels
- Book Riot's Best Books 2018
