= Mark Oshiro =

Latinx American author

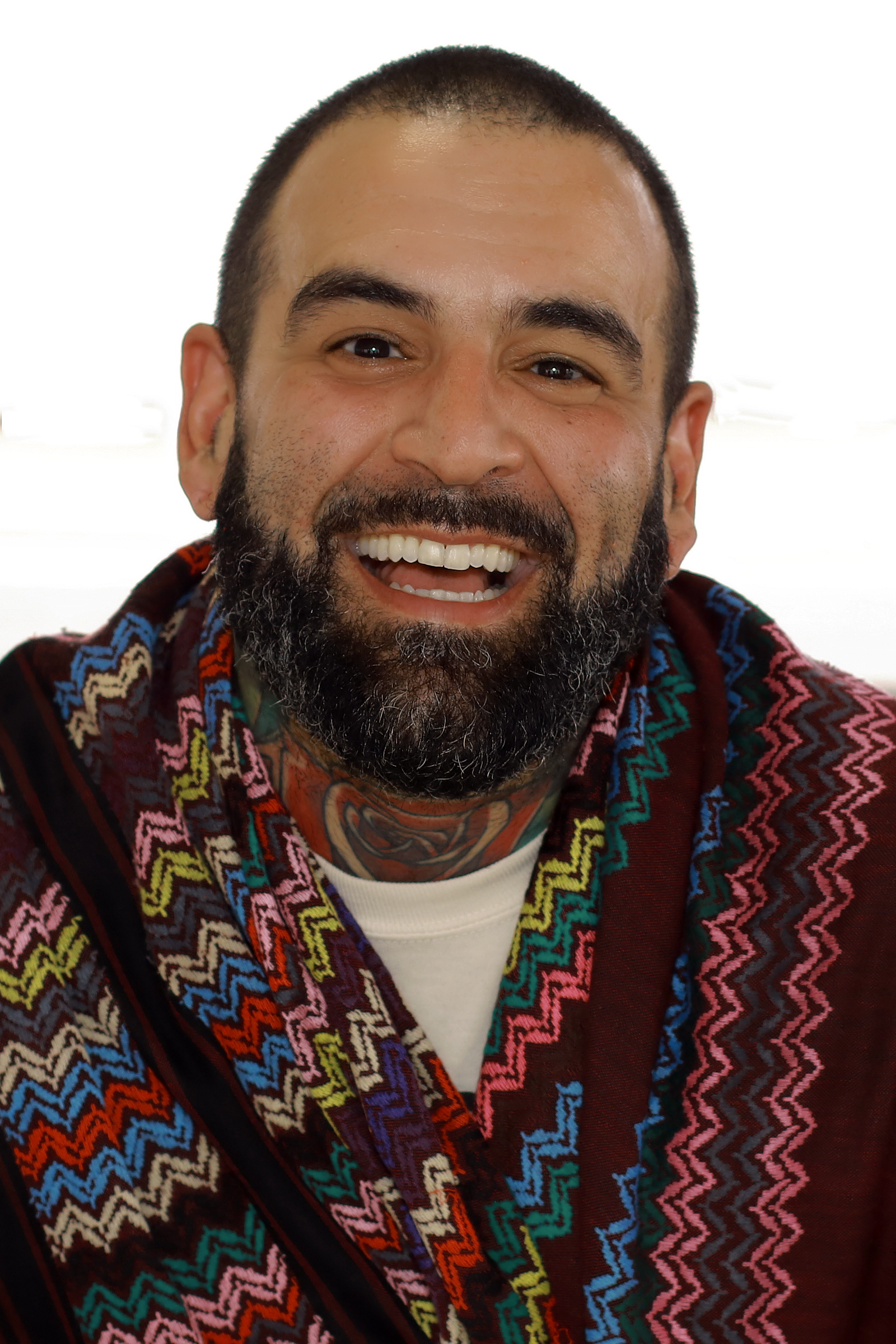
- Oshiro at the 2024 Texas Book Festival
- Born: October 23, 1983 (age 42) Los Angeles, California, U.S.
- Occupation: Author; editor; reviewer
- Genre: Young adult; fantasy; middle grade fiction
- Years active: 2009–present

Website
- www.markoshiro.com

Mark Oshiro (born October 23, 1983) is an American author, editor, and activist based in Atlanta, Georgia. They write young adult and middle grade fiction books, often exploring themes of identity, belonging, and family.

They were a Hugo-nominated writer for the online Mark Does Stuff universe in 2013 and 2014, where they analyze books and TV series. Their 2018 young adult novel, Anger Is a Gift, was a nominee for the 2019 Lambda Literary Award for LGBTQ Children's/Young Adult and won the 2019 Schneider Family Book Award. They are co-author of The Nico di Angelo Adventures series with Rick Riordan.

== Career ==
Oshiro's science-fiction short story, "No Me Dejas," was published to Slate on April 30, 2018.

On May 22, 2018, Oshiro published their debut young adult novel, Anger Is a Gift, through Tor Teen. It follows Moss Jeffries, a gay African-American student who suffers from panic attacks ever since his father was murdered by a police officer. The students organize a protest against police brutality and racist oppression. Moss also develops a romance with Javier, a Latino comic book artist.

On September 15, 2020, Oshiro published the fantasy novel Each of Us a Desert through Tor Teen. It takes place in a post-apocalyptic world, where the protagonist Xochitl resides in a village called Empalme. Xochitl is the village cuentista, who absorbs everyone's stories. Tired of her role, she ventures out on a journey of self-discovery. In October 2021, the book was included on Matt Krause's list of books to be banned from Texas schools; consequently, Oshiro experienced cancelled class visitations and loss of income.

Oshiro's first middle grade novel, The Insiders, was released on September 21, 2021. It follows Héctor Muñoz, a gay teenager, who finds a magic portal in his closet. Oshiro explained how they wrote it in their freshman or sophomore year of college, though it wasn't polished. Their intention was to "reclaim the closet": rather than being a coming out book, Oshiro asked, "What if you come out and have to go back in? How do you deal with this reality, which is that you have to come out for the rest of your life and figure out who you can talk to or not?"

On October 6, 2021, Oshiro was announced as the co-author of The Sun and the Star, alongside American author Rick Riordan. The novel was released May 1, 2023. Originally conceived as one book, Oshiro pitched the next idea of what would become the sequel. The sequel, The Court of the Dead, was released on September 23, 2025.

Oshiro's third YA novel, Into the Light, was released on March 28, 2023. It takes place in three different timelines through two characters and tackles conversion therapy. Colleen Mondor of Locus stated how the author "masterfully takes on an enormously important topic with his compelling, realistic, horrific novel ... powerful".

== Personal life ==
Oshiro was born on October 23, 1983, and raised in Riverside, California. They are a transracial adoptee: they are Latinx, their mother is white, and their father is Japanese Hawaiian. They converted to Catholicism as a teenager.

As of 2023, Oshiro lives in Atlanta, Georgia.

== Bibliography ==
=== Young adult ===
- Anger is a Gift (2018)
- Each of Us a Desert (2020)
- Into the Light (2023)

=== Middle grade ===
- The Insiders (2021)
- You Only Live Once (2022)
- Star Wars Hunters: Battle for the Arena (2023)
- The Sun and the Star (2023; with Rick Riordan)
- The Court of the Dead (2025; with Rick Riordan)
- Jasmine is Haunted (2024)

=== Short stories ===
- "No Me Dejas" (2018; Future Tense, for Slate)
- "Pact" (2020; Foreshadow YA: A Serial Anthology)
- "Refresh" (2020; Out Now: Queer We Go Again!)
- "Mirrors, Windows & Selfies" (2020; Vampires Never Get Old: Tales with Fresh Bite)
- "Hunger" (2020; from From a Certain Point of View: 40 Stories Celebrating 40 Years of The Empire Strikes Back)
- "Unmoor" (2020; A Universe of Wishes: A We Need Diverse Books Anthology)
- "Shipwrecked" (2021; This Way Madness Lies: YA Shakespeare Reimaginings)
- "Guess What's Coming to Dinner" (2021; This Is Our Rainbow: 16 Stories of Her, Him, Them, and Us)
- "Eres un Pocho" (2021; Wild Tongues Can't Be Tamed: 15 Voices From the Latinx Diaspora)
- "This Is Our Manifesto" (2022; Reclaim the Stars: Seventeen Tales Across Realm and Space)
- "Fake Scorpio" (2022; All Signs Point to Yes)
- "Paranoia" (2022; Don't Touch That: An Anthology of Parenthood in SFF)
- "How Slow the Snow Is Falling" (2023; When We Become Ours)
- "Wasps" (2024; from The White Guy Dies First: 13 Scary Stories of Fear and Power)

=== Non-fiction ===
- "Closing the Gap: The Blurring of Fan and Professional" (Uncanny Magazine, Issue 9 [March/April 2016])
- "Inferior Beasts" (Uncanny Magazine, Issue 14 [January/February 2017])
- "Parched" (Invisible, vol. 1, edited by Jim C. Hines)
- "The Unintended Education of Literature" (2020; Latinx in Publishing)
