= Ascalaphus (son of Acheron) =

Ancient Greek mythological figure

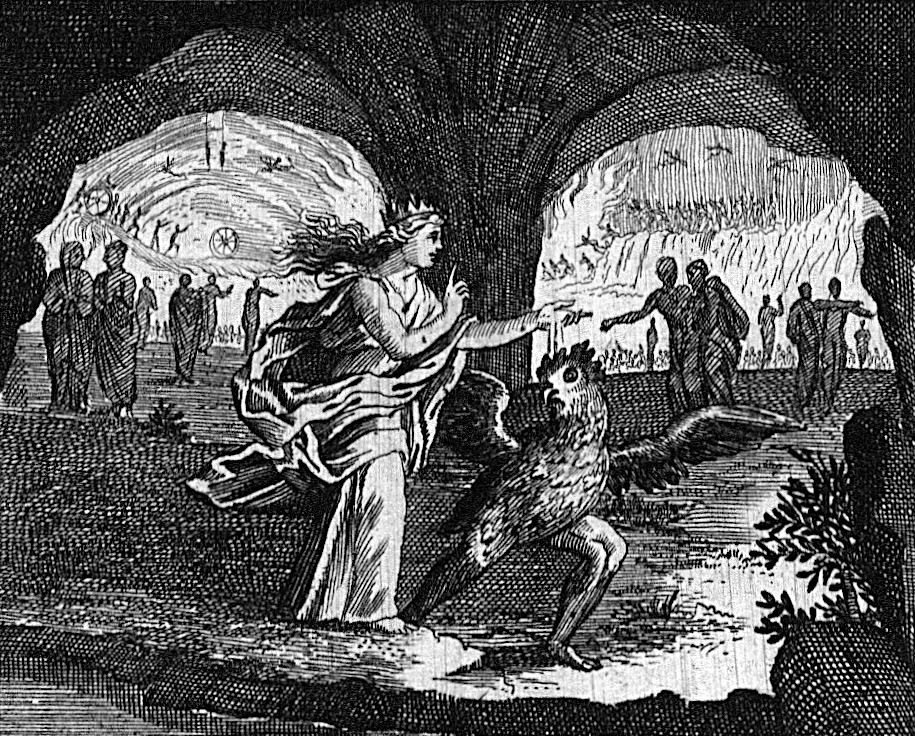
Demeter turns Ascalaphus into an owl. Engraving by Johann Ulrich Kraus, 1690

In Greek mythology, Ascalaphus (/əˈskæləfəs/; Ancient Greek: Ἀσκάλαφος Askalaphos) was the son of Acheron and Orphne.

== Mythology ==
Ascalaphus is the son of the stygian river god, Acheron, and the nymph, Orphne, and who was the custodian of Hades' orchard in the Underworld. He told the other gods that Persephone had eaten pomegranate seeds in the Underworld. Because she had tasted food in the underworld, Persephone was obliged to return to the Underworld and spend four months (in later versions six months) there every year.

According to Ovid, Ascalaphus' words caused Persephone to groan in distress as she changed him into an eagle owl by sprinkling him with water of the river Phlegethon. Ovid mentions: "He saw and told, in spite, and by his tale stole her return away. The Queen of Hell groaned in distress and changed the tale-bearer into a bird. So he became the vilest bird; a messenger of grief; the lazy owl; sad omen to mankind."

Apollodorus' version explicitly states that Persephone ate a pomegranate seed, having "no foreknowledge of the outcome of her act". Ascalaphus later testifies against her, and Demeter then punishes him by burying him beneath a heavy rock in the underworld. When Heracles visits the underworld, he rolls the stone away and releases him from his prison. Demeter then transforms Ascalaphus into an eagle owl.

== See also ==
- Ascalaphidae – the owlflies, named after Ascalaphus
