= Deuteragonist =

Second most important character in a narrative

In literature, the deuteragonist (/ˌdjuːtəˈræɡənɪst/ DEW-tə-RAG-ə-nist; from Ancient Greek δευτεραγωνιστής (deuteragōnistḗs) 'second actor') or secondary main character is the second most important character of a narrative, after the protagonist and before the tritagonist. The deuteragonist often acts as a constant companion to the protagonist or as someone who continues actively aiding a protagonist. The deuteragonist may switch between supporting and opposing the protagonist, depending on their own conflict or plot.

== History ==
Ancient Greek drama began with simply one actor, the protagonist, and a chorus of dancers. The playwright Aeschylus introduced the deuteragonist; Aristotle says in his Poetics:

Καὶ τό τε τῶν ὑποκριτῶν πλῆθος ἐξ ἑνὸς εἰς δύο πρῶτος Αἰσχύλος ἤγαγε καὶ τὰ τοῦ χοροῦ ἠλάττωσε καὶ τὸν λόγον πρωταγωνιστεῖν παρεσκεύασεν

Kaì tó te tôn hupokritôn plêthos ex henòs eis dúo prôtos Aiskhúlos ḗgage kaì tà toû khoroû ēláttōse kaì tòn lógon prōtagōnisteîn pareskeúasen

Thus, it was Aeschylus who first raised the number of the actors from one to two. He also curtailed the chorus and made the dialogue be the leading part.

— Aristotle, Poetics (1449a15)

Aeschylus' efforts brought the dialogue and interaction between characters to the forefront and set the stage for other playwrights of the era, like Sophocles and Euripides, to produce many iconic plays.

== Drama ==
Because ancient Greek drama involved only three actors (the protagonist, deuteragonist, and tritagonist) plus the chorus, each actor often played several parts. For instance, in Sophocles' Oedipus Rex, the protagonist would be Oedipus, who is on stage in most acts, the deuteragonist would be Jocasta (Oedipus' mother and wife), and the tritagonist would play the Shepherd and Messenger.

This would be because Jocasta is certainly a major role—acting opposite Oedipus many times and occupying a central part of the story—and because the Shepherd and Messenger are onstage when Jocasta is offstage.
