= Tritagonist =

Third most important character of a narrative

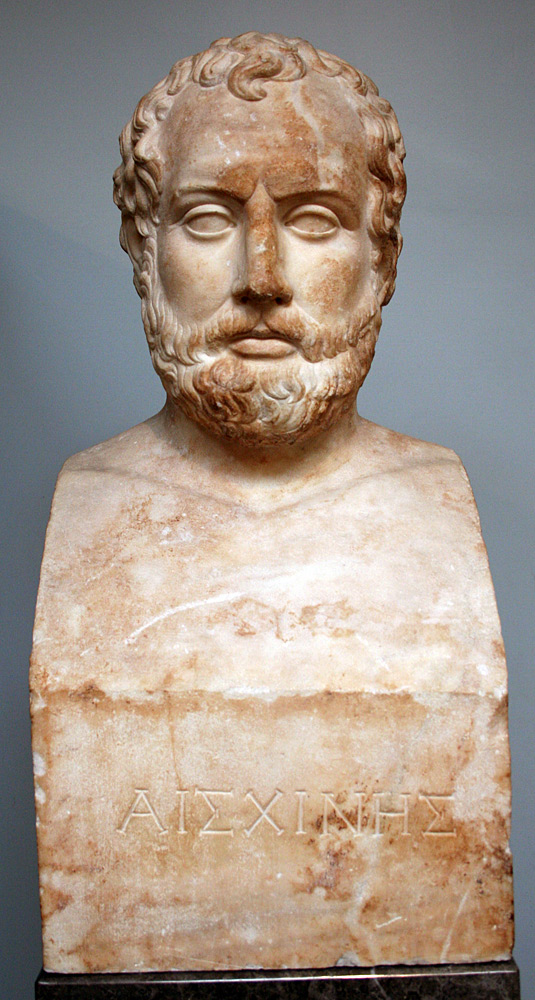
Marble bust of Aeschines. Greek, 4th - 2nd century BC. Found in ʽHeraclea Lyncestisʼ, today in the Republic of Macedonia. On display in the British Museum, London.

In literature, the tritagonist (from Ancient Greek τριταγωνιστής (tritagōnistḗs) 'third actor') or tertiary main character is the third most important character of a narrative, after the protagonist and deuteragonist. In ancient Greek drama, the tritagonist was the third member of the acting troupe.

As a character, a tritagonist may act as the instigator or cause of the sufferings of the protagonist. Despite being the least sympathetic character of the drama, they occasion the situations by which pity and sympathy for the protagonist are heightened.

== History ==
The part of the tritagonist emerged from earlier forms of two-actor drama. Where two actors only allowed for a principal character and their adversary, moving the part of adversary to a third actor (the tritagonist) allowed for the second actor (the deuteragonist) to play roles as a confidant or aide to the principal character, and thereby elicit greater character depth from the principal character by having the protagonist explain their feelings and motivations to an on-stage listener. As Ancient Greek theater recitations were partly melodic, the role of the tritagonist would typically go to a performer with a voice in the bass range (as compared to the protagonist as tenor and the deuteragonist as baritone). Cicero, in his Divinatio in Caecilium, reported that the tritagonist (being a role of lesser importance than the protagonist) would often have to subdue his voice if he was naturally stronger than the protagonist.

Notable Ancient Greek actors who worked in this role include the orator Aeschines, who was held by Demosthenes to have been untalented as a tritagonist, and Myniscus, who was tritagonist under the playwright Aeschylus.

In some forms of Greek theater, it was traditional for the tritagonist to enter the stage from the left.
