= Orphne =

Ancient Greek nymph

In Greek mythology, Orphne (/ˈɔːrfniː/ ORF-nee; Ancient Greek: Ὀρφνή, romanized: Orphnḗ, from ὄρφνη, órphnē, 'darkness') was a nymph that lived in Hades. She was also known as Styx (/stɪks/ STIKS; Στύξ, Stýx) or Gorgyra (/ɡɔːrˈdʒaɪrə/ gor-JY-rə; Γόργυρα, Górgȳra, from γόργυρα, górgȳra, 'underground drain'). With Acheron, she mothered Ascalaphus.

Orphne also seems to be one translation of the name of the Roman goddess Caligo (Darkness).
