= Jamsai =

Thai publishing company

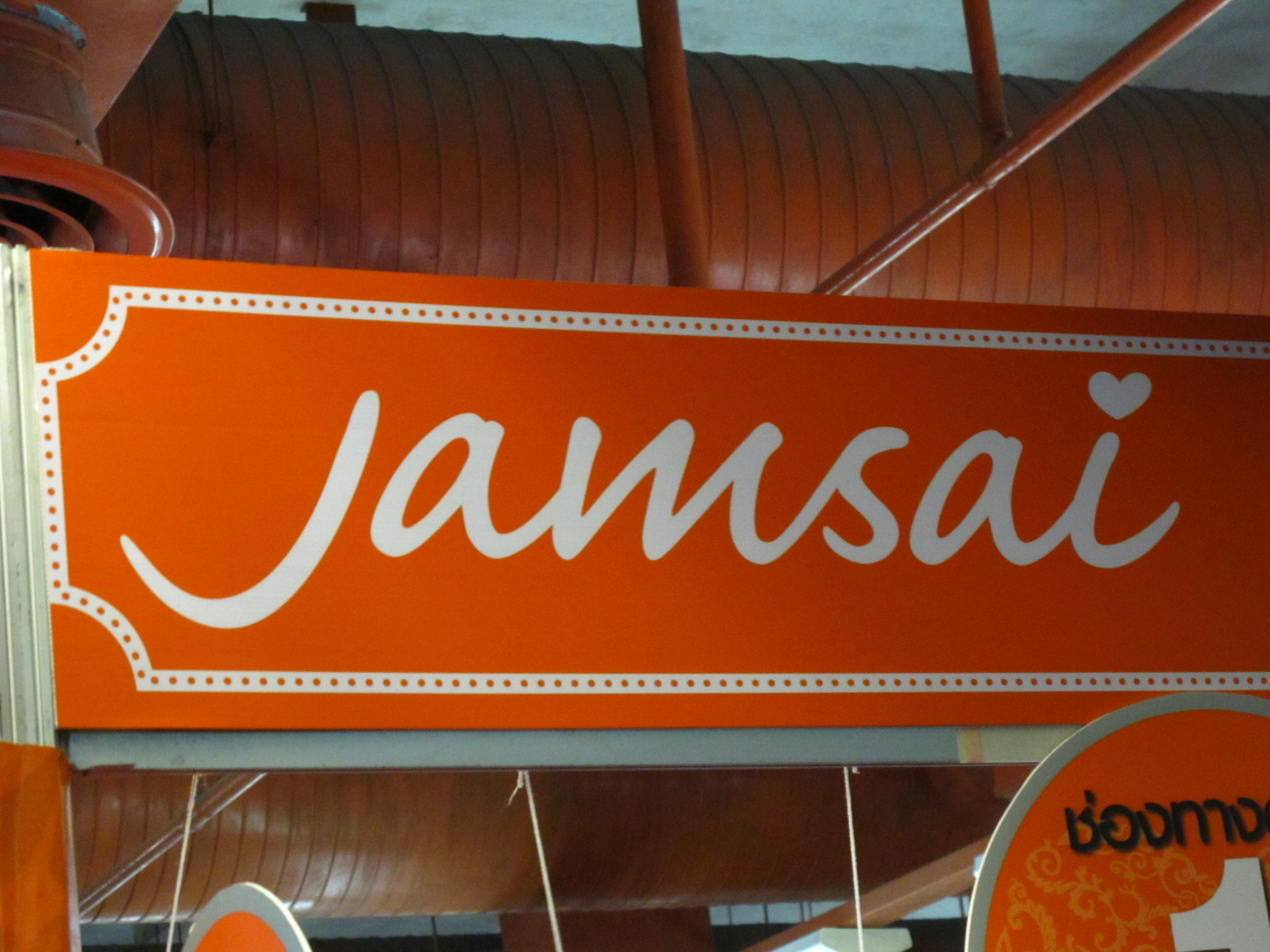
Jamsai

Jamsai is a publishing company located in Bangkok, Thailand. Publishing since 2002, Jamsai has four brands: Jamsai Publishing Books, Enter Books Publishing, Zion Press Publishing, and Book Wave Publishing. It is considered one of the largest publishers of teen romantic fiction in Thailand. This publishing company has published many famous Thai writers. Jamsai also supports many charities benefitting local communities.

Jamsai's publishing operation releases romantic fiction books targeting women, as well as general interest, young adult literature, suspense, fantasy, contemporary fiction, business and computer technology, as well as educational books for children. Jamsai's website is also one of the most popular websites in Thailand.

== Type of book Jamsai publishing ==
- ความรู้สึกดี... ที่เรียกว่ารัก
- Jamsai Love Series
- มากกว่ารัก
- Cookie
- Enter Light Novel
- Jamsai Light Novel
- Jamsai
- Jamsai Award
- Dreamland Of Love
- Magic Cafe' Love
- Magic Cafe
- Book Wave (การ์ตูนอัจฉริยะ)
- Sweet Asian
- Enter Books
- ปกิณกะ
- romantic suspense
- Sweet Asian
- Dreamland Of Love
- Magic Cafe' Love
- Magic Caf'
- EverY

== Gallery ==
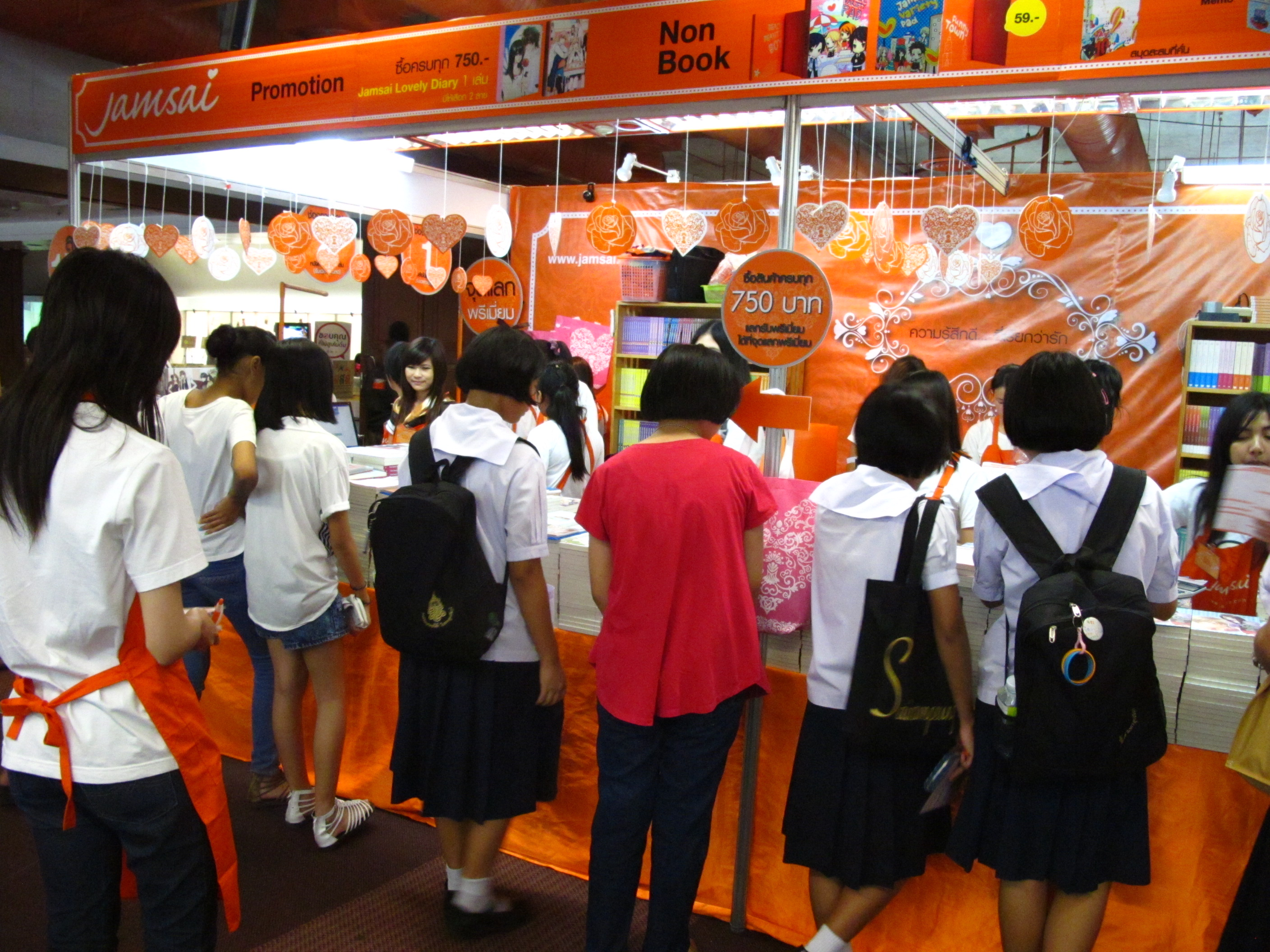
Romance novel for Thai teen

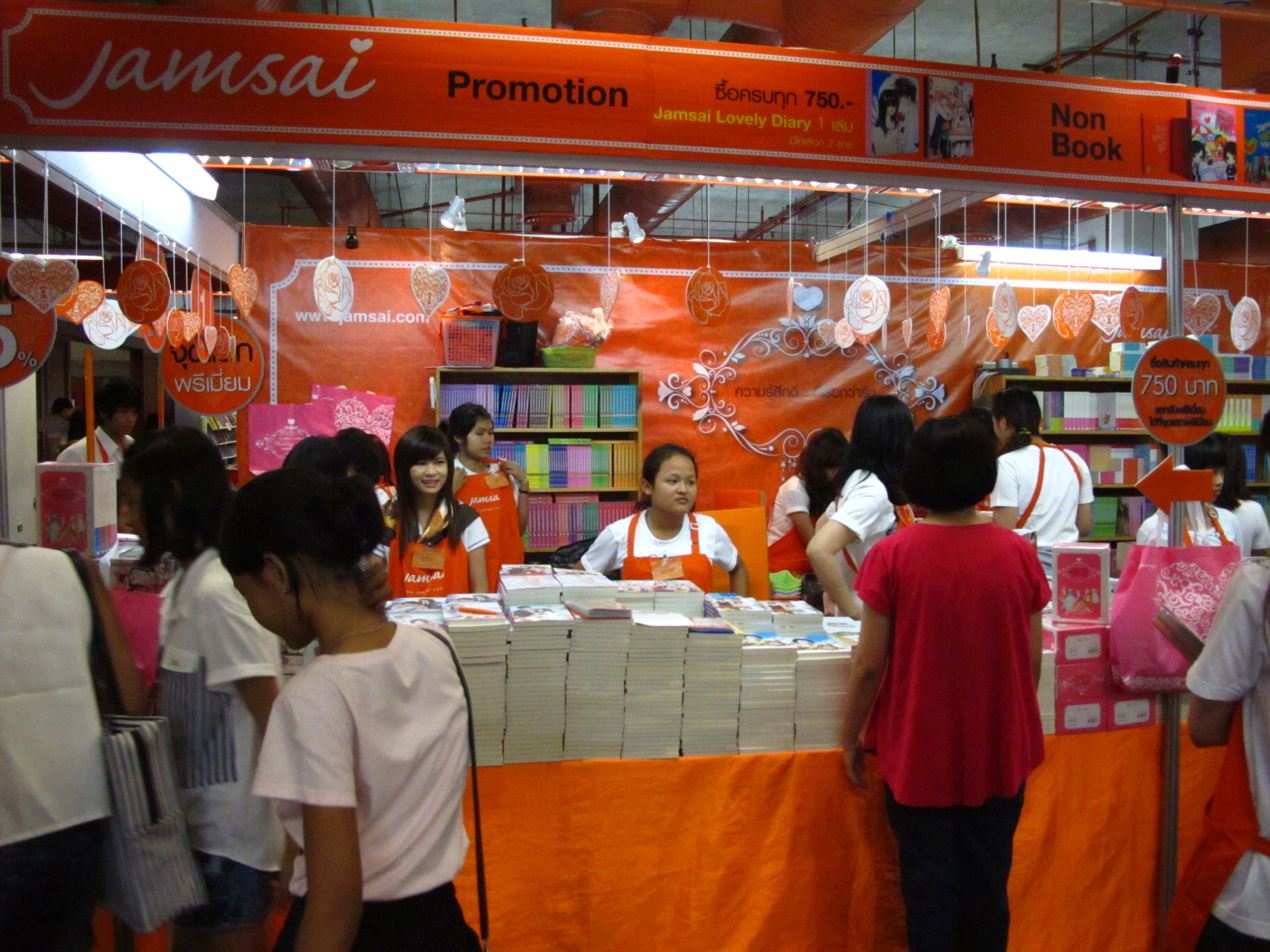
Jamsai booth

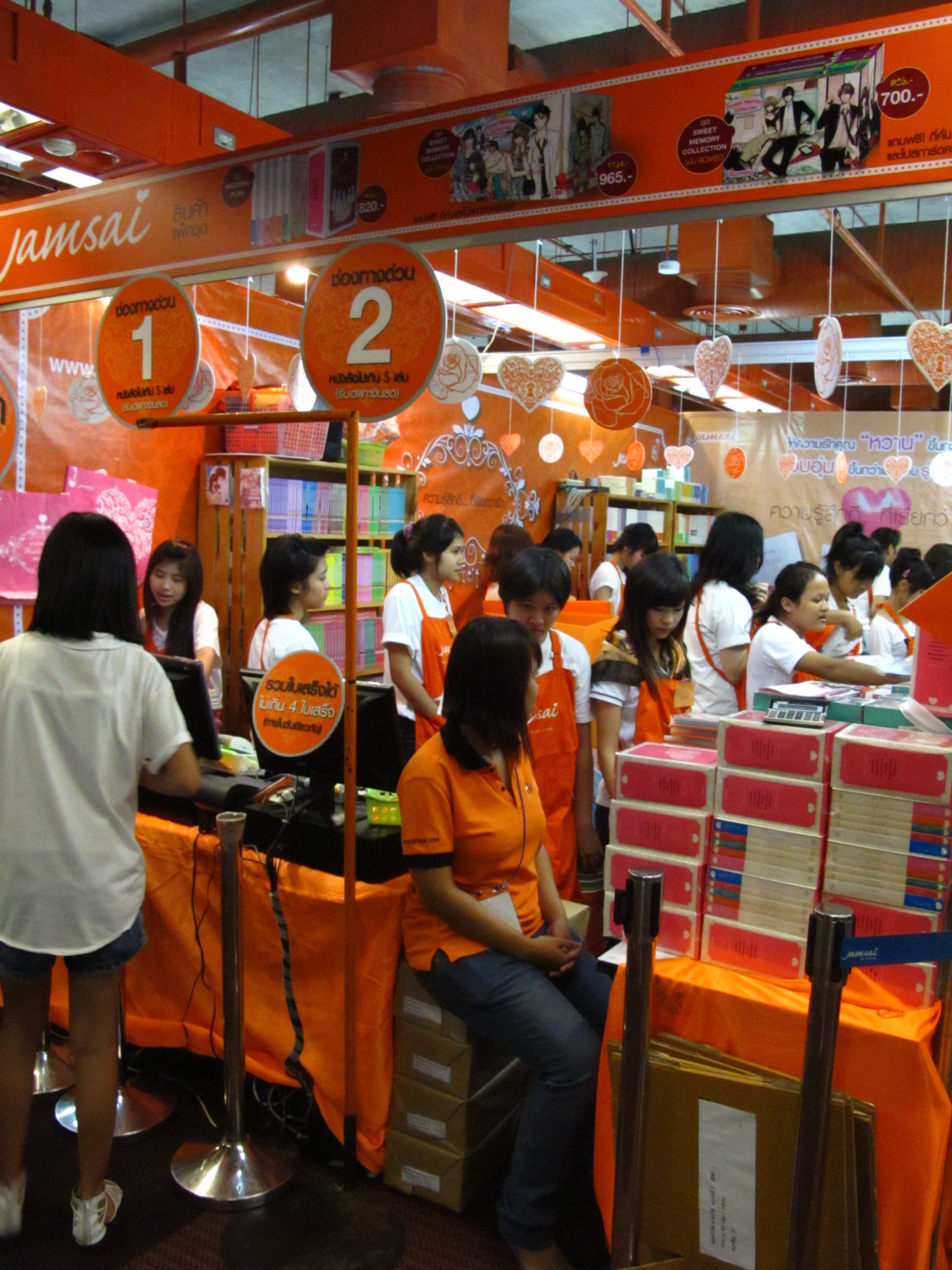
Booth at Queen Sirikit National Convention Center
