= Sally Jackson =

American academic

- Born: Sally Ann Jackson

Academic background
- Education: University of Illinois at Urbana–Champaign

Academic work
- Discipline: argumentation, communication, and rhetoric
- Institutions: University of Arizona; University of Illinois at Urbana-Champaign

Sally Ann Jackson is an American scholar of argumentation, communication, and rhetoric. She is Professor Emerita of Communication at the University of Illinois at Urbana-Champaign.

== Biography ==
Jackson earned all three of her degrees from the University of Illinois at Urbana-Champaign and has held faculty positions at the University of Nebraska-Lincoln (1979–1982), Michigan State University (1982–1985), University of Oklahoma (1985–1990), and the University of Arizona (1991–2007). At Arizona she also served in a series of administrative positions, including Vice Provost/Vice President for Learning and Information Technologies and Chief Information Officer. In 2007 she returned to the University of Illinois as a faculty member and Chief Information Officer of the campus. She resigned from the position of CIO in 2011 to protest administrative changes that she feared would harm the Urbana campus' status as a world leader in information technology but remains a faculty member.

The central theme in Professor Jackson's work has been communication design, with specific interests ranging from the natural design of argumentation to highly engineered systems for managing complex human activities. Her work has appeared in Communication Monographs, Communication Theory, Journal of the American Forensic Association, Quarterly Journal of Speech, and Argumentation, among other journals. She has written or co-authored three books.

== Selected awards ==
- from the National Communication Association:
  - Charles Woolbert Research Award, 1995
  - Golden Anniversary Monograph Award, 1981
  - Outstanding Scholarship Award, Language and Social Interaction Division, 2005
- from the American Forensic Association:
  - Daniel Rohrer Memorial Research Award, 1993
- from the International Society for the Study of Argumentation:
  - Distinguished Scholar Award, 1997

== Selected works ==
Selected works:

- Aakhus, M., & Jackson, S. (2005). Technology, design, and interaction. In K. Fitch & R. E. Sanders (eds)., Handbook of Language and Social Interaction, (pp. 411–436). Mahwah, NJ: Erlbaum.
- Jackson, S., & Brashers, D. E. (1994). Random Factors in ANOVA, Quantitative Applications in the Social Sciences . Newbury Park, CA: Sage.
- Jackson, S., & Wolski, S. (2001). Identification of and adaptation to students' preinstructional beliefs in introductory communication research methods: Contributions of interactive web technology. Communication Education, 50, 189–205.
- Eemeren, F. H. van, Grootendorst, R., Jackson, S., & Jacobs, S. (1993). Reconstructing Argumentative Discourse. Tuscaloosa, AL: University of Alabama.
- Jackson, S. (1992).Message Effects Research: Principles of design and analysis. New York: Guilford.
