= Acheron =

River in Greece

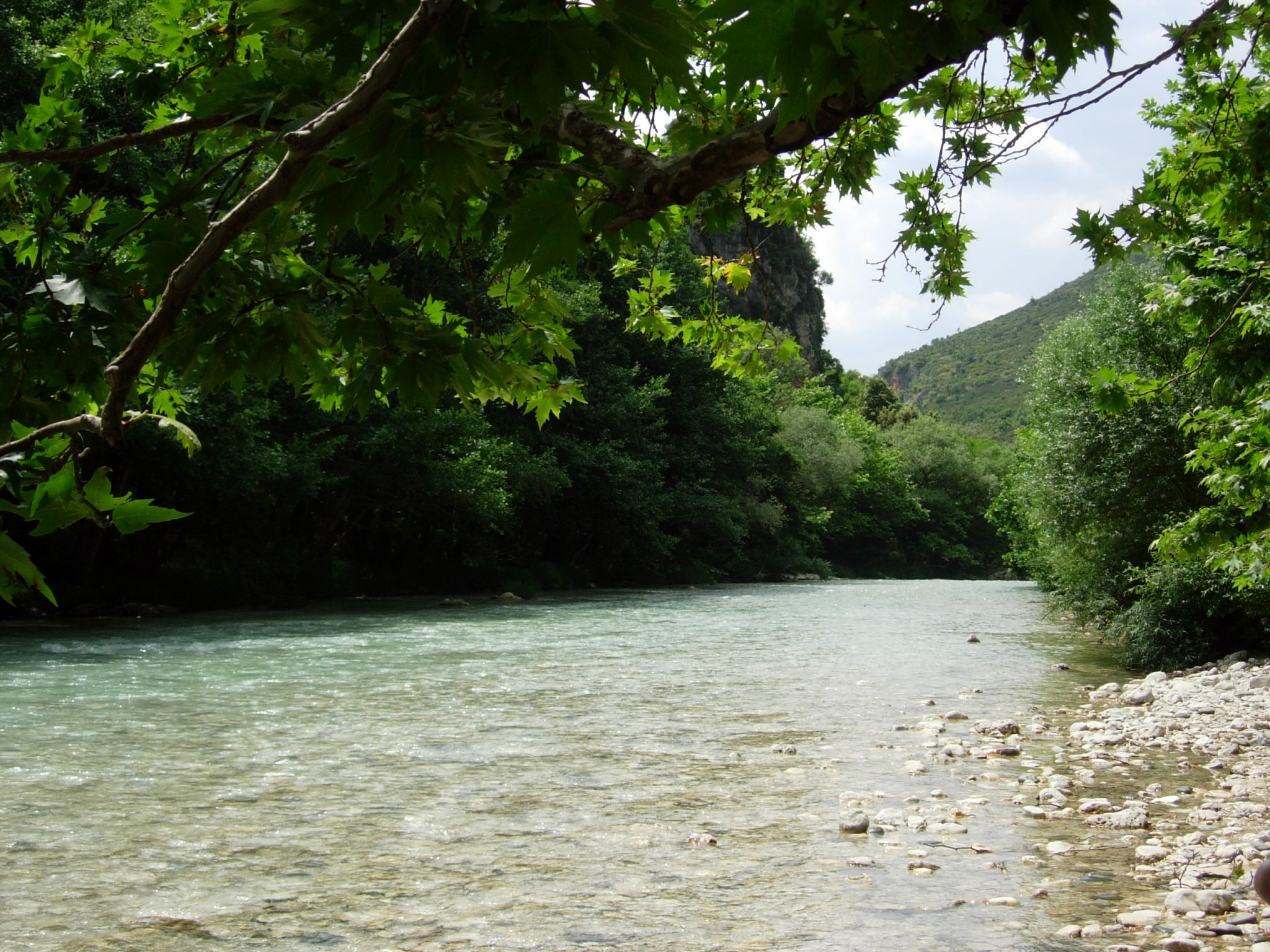
- Acheron river near the village of Glyki

Location
- Country: Greece

Physical characteristics
- Source
  - location: Ioannina regional unit, Epirus
- Mouth
  - location: Ionian Sea
  - coordinates: 39°14′10″N 20°28′34″E
- Length: 52 km (32 mi)
- Basin size: 705 km^{2} (272 sq mi)

The Acheron (/ˈækərən/ or /ˈækərɒn/; Ancient Greek: Ἀχέρων, romanized: Akhérōn or Ἀχερούσιος, Akheroúsios; Greek: Αχέροντας, romanized: Achérondas) is a river in the Epirus region of northwest Greece.

In Greek mythology, Acheron is often depicted as the entrance to the Greek underworld where souls must be ferried across by Charon (although some later sources, such as Roman poets, assign this role to the river Styx).

== Description ==
It is 52 km (32 mi) long, and has a drainage area of 705 km^{2} (272 sq mi). The river's source is located near the village Zotiko, in the southwestern part of the Ioannina regional unit. The Acheron flows into the Ionian Sea in Ammoudia, near Parga.

== Mythology ==
Ancient Greek mythology saw the Acheron, sometimes known as the "river of woe", as one of the five rivers of the Greek underworld. The name is of uncertain etymology.

Most classical accounts, including Pausanias (10.28) and later Dante's Inferno (3.78), portray the Acheron as the entrance to the Underworld and depict Charon ferrying the souls of the dead across it. Ancient Greek literary sources such as Pindar, Aeschylus, Euripides, Plato, and Callimachus also place Charon on the Acheron. Roman poets, including Propertius, Ovid, and Statius, name the river as the Styx, perhaps following the geography of Virgil's underworld in the Aeneid, where Charon is associated with both rivers.

The Homeric poems describe the Acheron as a river of Hades, into which Cocytus and Phlegethon both flowed.

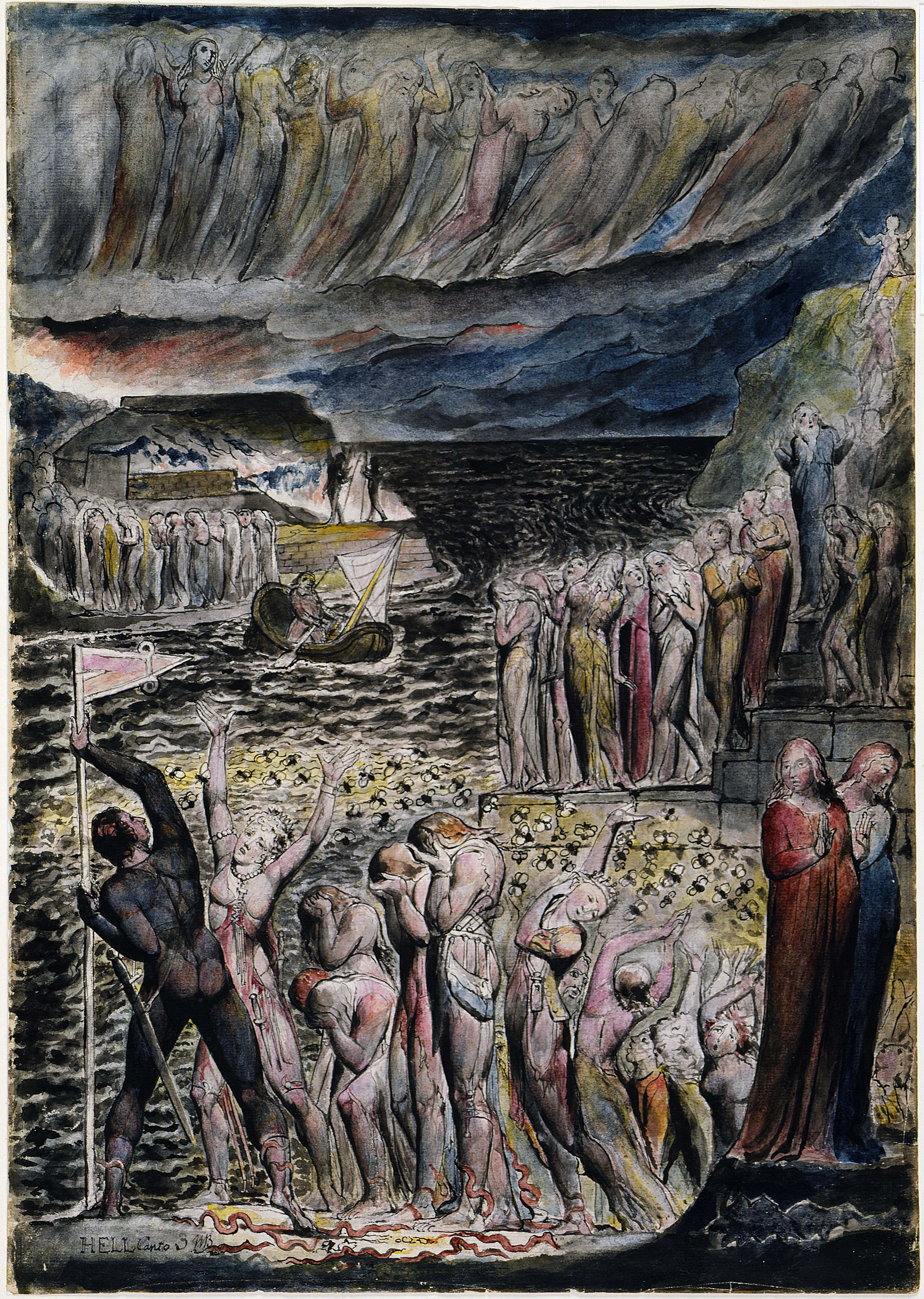
William Blake's depiction of "The Vestibule of Hell and the Souls Mustering to Cross the Acheron" in his Illustrations to Dante's "Divine Comedy", object 5, c. 1824–27. The original for the work is held by the National Gallery of Victoria.

The Roman poet Virgil called the Acheron the principal river of Tartarus, from which the Styx and the Cocytus both sprang. The newly dead would be ferried across the Acheron by Charon in order to enter the Underworld.

The Suda describes the river as "a place of healing, not a place of punishment, cleansing and purging the sins of humans".

Different sources describe Acheron as the father of Ascalaphus by either Orphne or Gorgyra.

The river called Acheron with the nearby ruins of the Necromanteion (oratory of the dead) is found near Parga on the mainland of Greece opposite Corfu. Another branch of Acheron was believed to surface at the Acherusian cape (now Karadeniz Ereğli in Turkey) and was seen by the Argonauts according to Apollonius of Rhodes. Greeks who settled in Italy identified the Acherusian lake into which Acheron flowed with Lake Avernus. Plato, in his Phaedo, identified Acheron as the second greatest river in the world, excelled only by Oceanus.

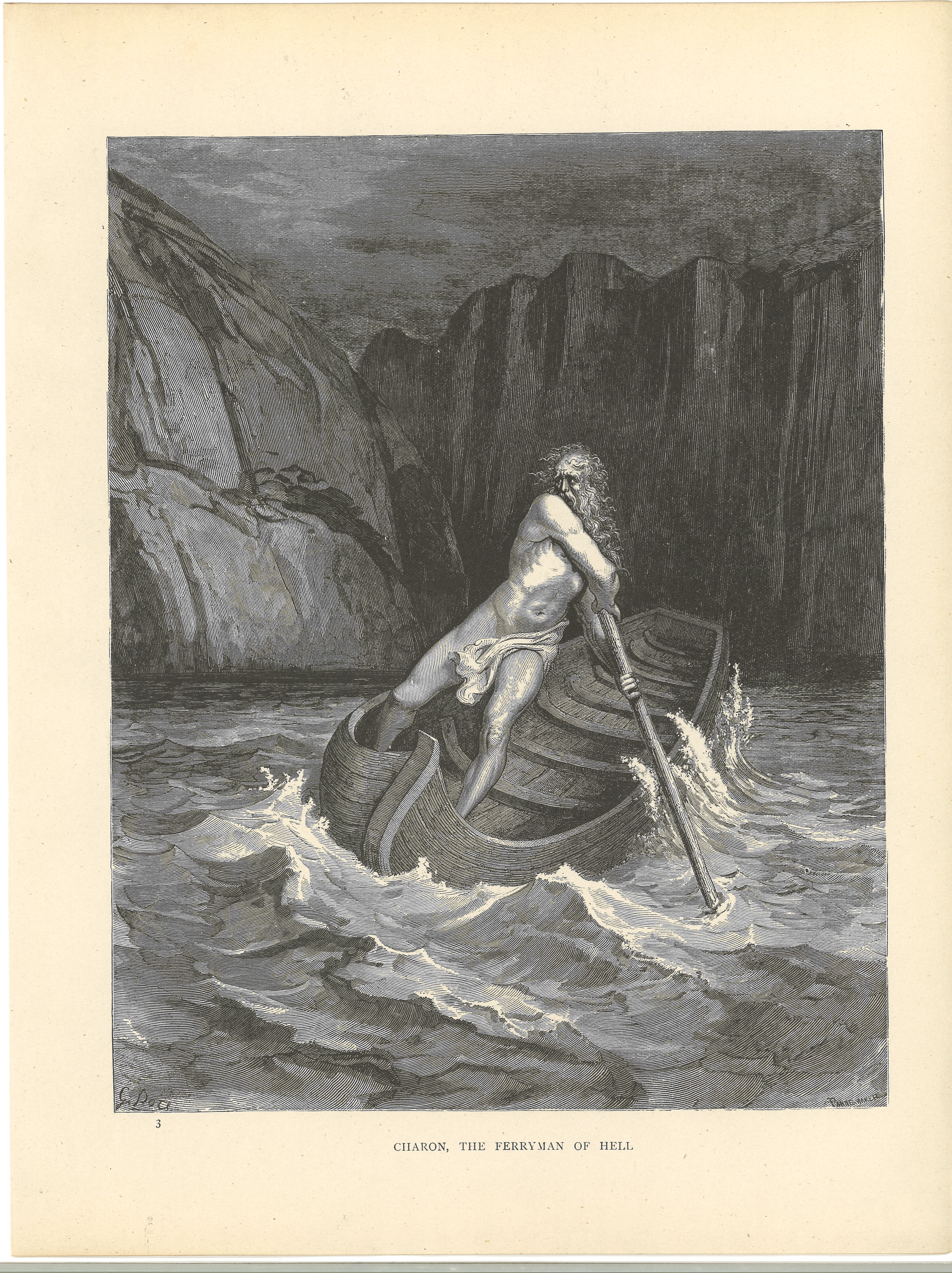
Following Greek mythology, Charon ferries souls across the Acheron to Hell. Those who were neutral in life sit on the banks.

He claimed that Acheron flowed in the opposite direction from Oceanus beneath the earth under desert places. The word is also occasionally used as a synecdoche for Hades itself. Virgil mentions Acheron with the other infernal rivers in his description of the underworld in Book VI of the Aeneid. In Book VII, line 312, he gives to Juno the famous saying, flectere si nequeo superos, Acheronta movebo: "If I cannot bend the will of Heaven, I shall move Hell." The same words were used by Sigmund Freud as the dedicatory motto for his seminal book The Interpretation of Dreams, figuring Acheron as psychological underworld beneath the conscious mind.

The Acheron was sometimes referred to as a lake or swamp in Greek literature, as in Aristophanes' The Frogs and Euripides' Alcestis.

In Dante's Inferno, the Acheron river forms the border of Hell. Following Greek mythology, Charon ferries souls across this river to Hell. Those who were neutral in life sit on the banks.

== In culture ==
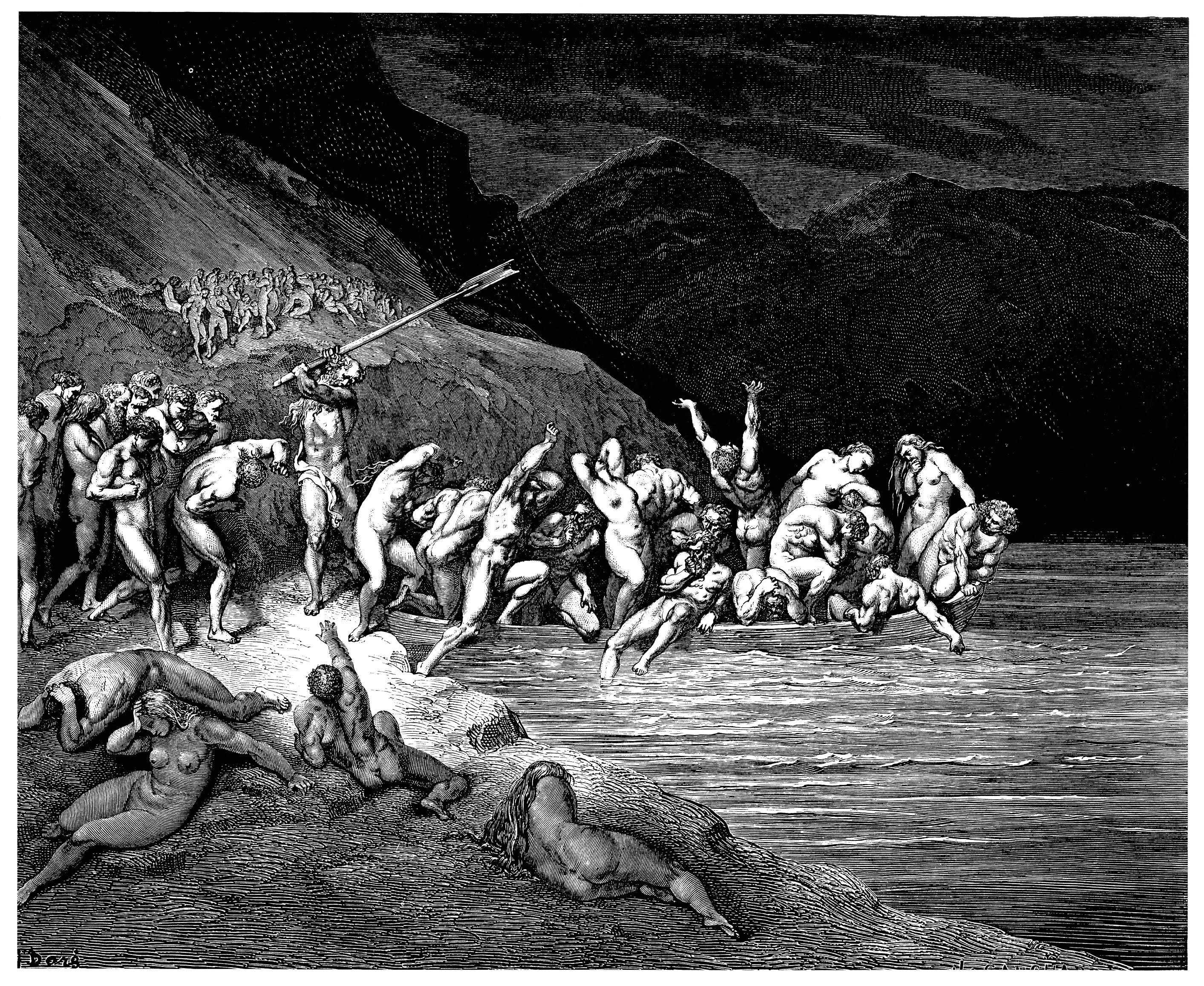
In the Divine Comedy, Charon forces reluctant sinners onto his boat by beating them with his oar. Illustration by Gustave Doré.

- In Dante's Inferno, Charon ferries newly deceased sinners across Acheron.
- In Christopher Marlowe's play, The Tragical History of Doctor Faustus, Acheron is mentioned in Act I, scene iii, wherein Doctor Faustus conjures Mephistophiles: Sint mihi dei Acherontis propitii, or "May the gods of Hell (Acheron) be propitious unto me."
- In Shakespeare's play, Macbeth, Acheron is referenced as a euphemism for the gates of hell by Hecate in Act III, scene v: "Get you gone, and at the pit of Acheron meet me i' th' morning."

== Namesake ==
Acheron Lake in Antarctica is named after the mythical river.

Several English naval vessels have been named HMS Acheron.

There is a stream named the Dry Acheron in Canterbury, New Zealand.

The Eocene turtle genus Acherontemys of the Roslyn Formation in North America was named in reference to the Acheron mythos.

Acheron Fossae form large troughs north of Olympus Mons on the Mars northern hemisphere.

== Gallery ==
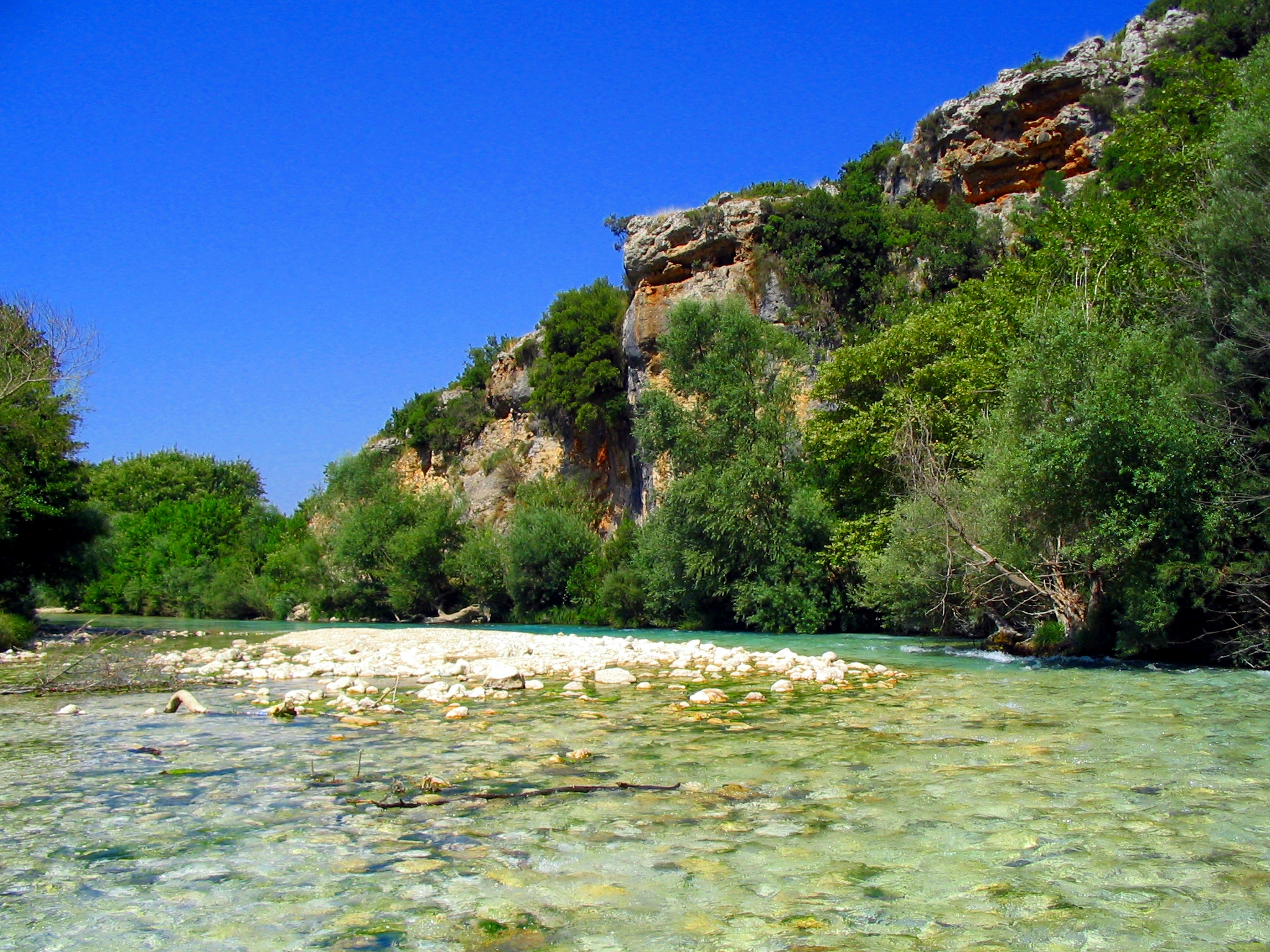
Acheron river

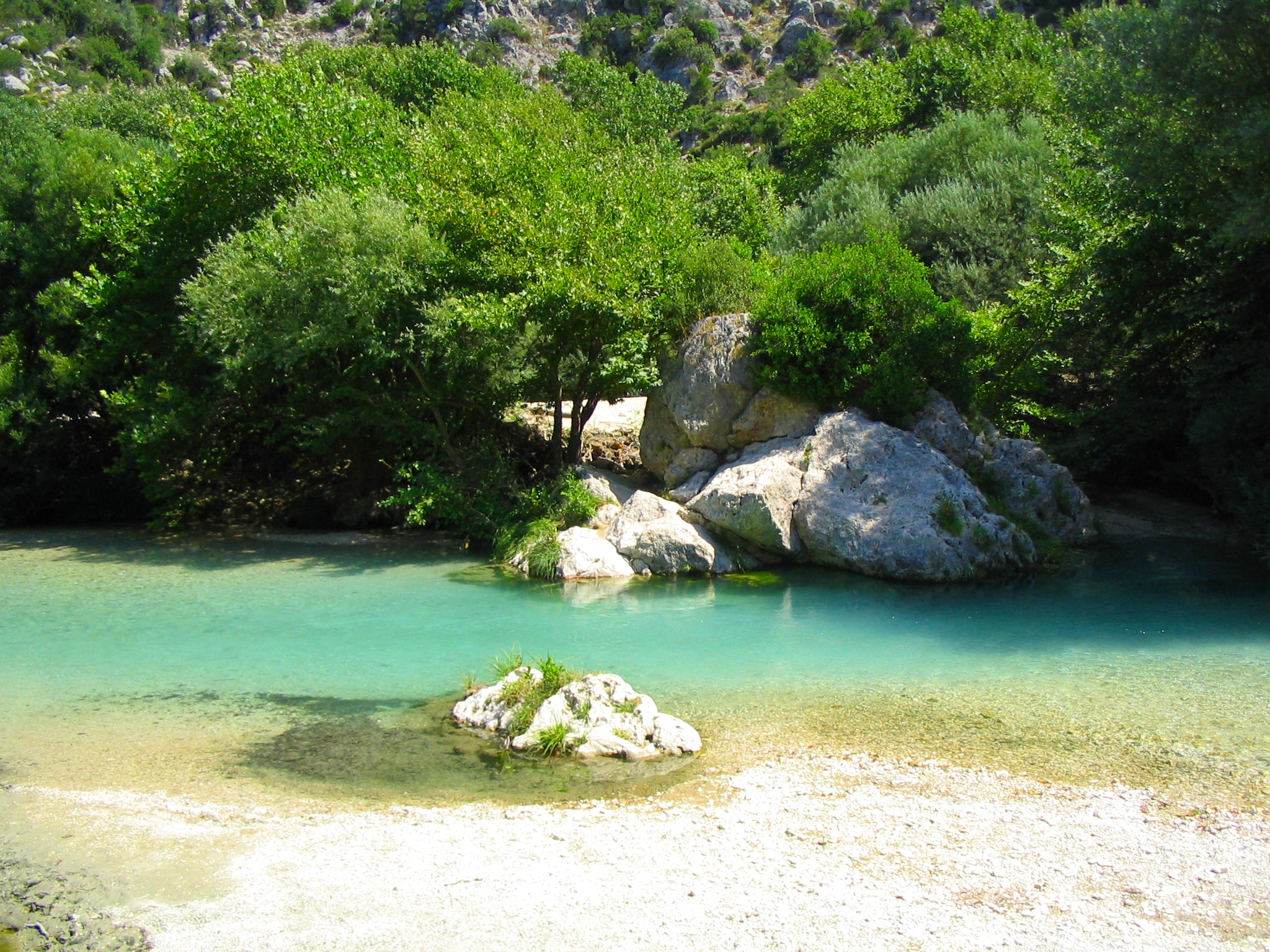
Acheron river (another view)

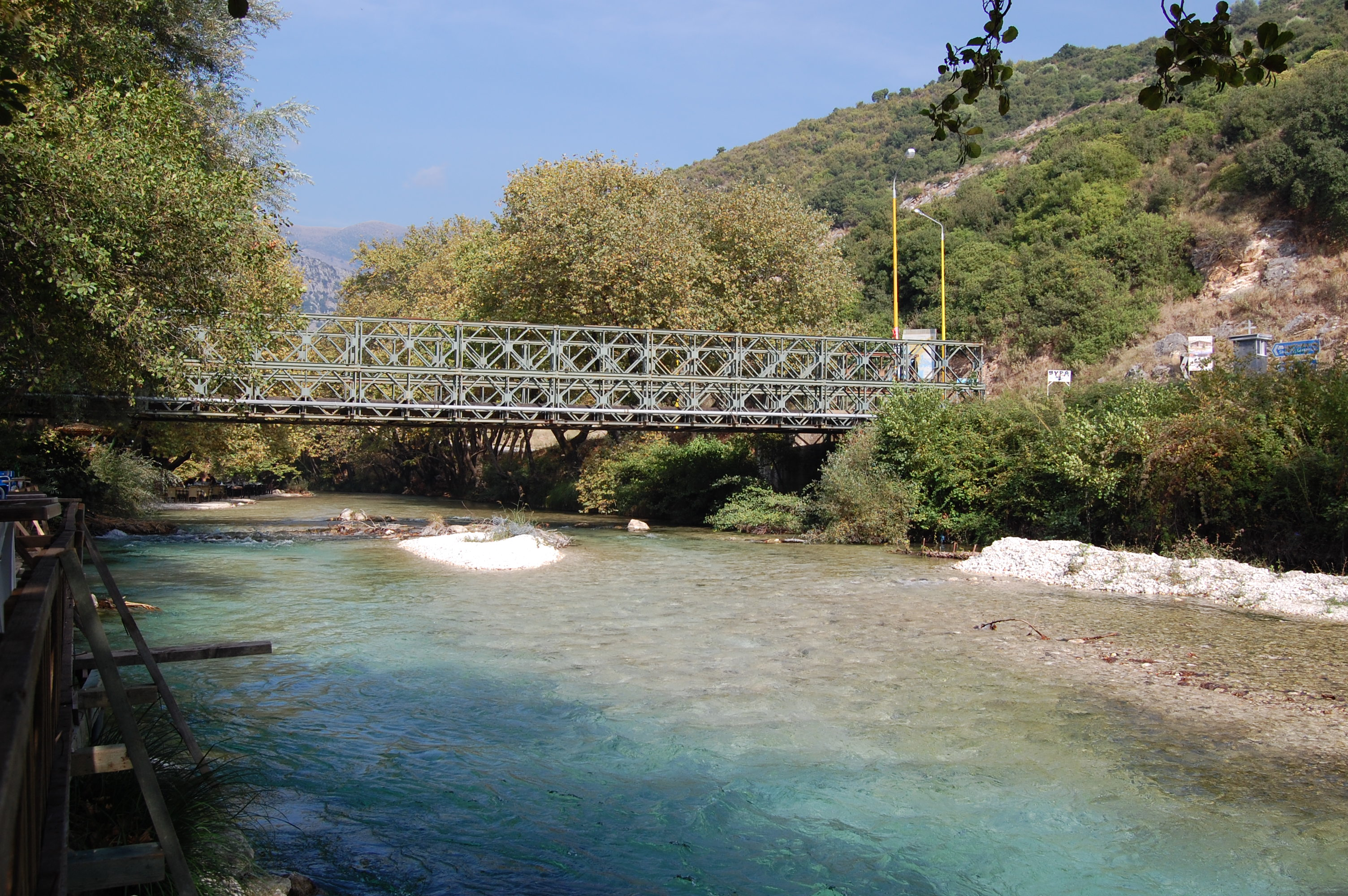
Truss bridge over the Acheron river

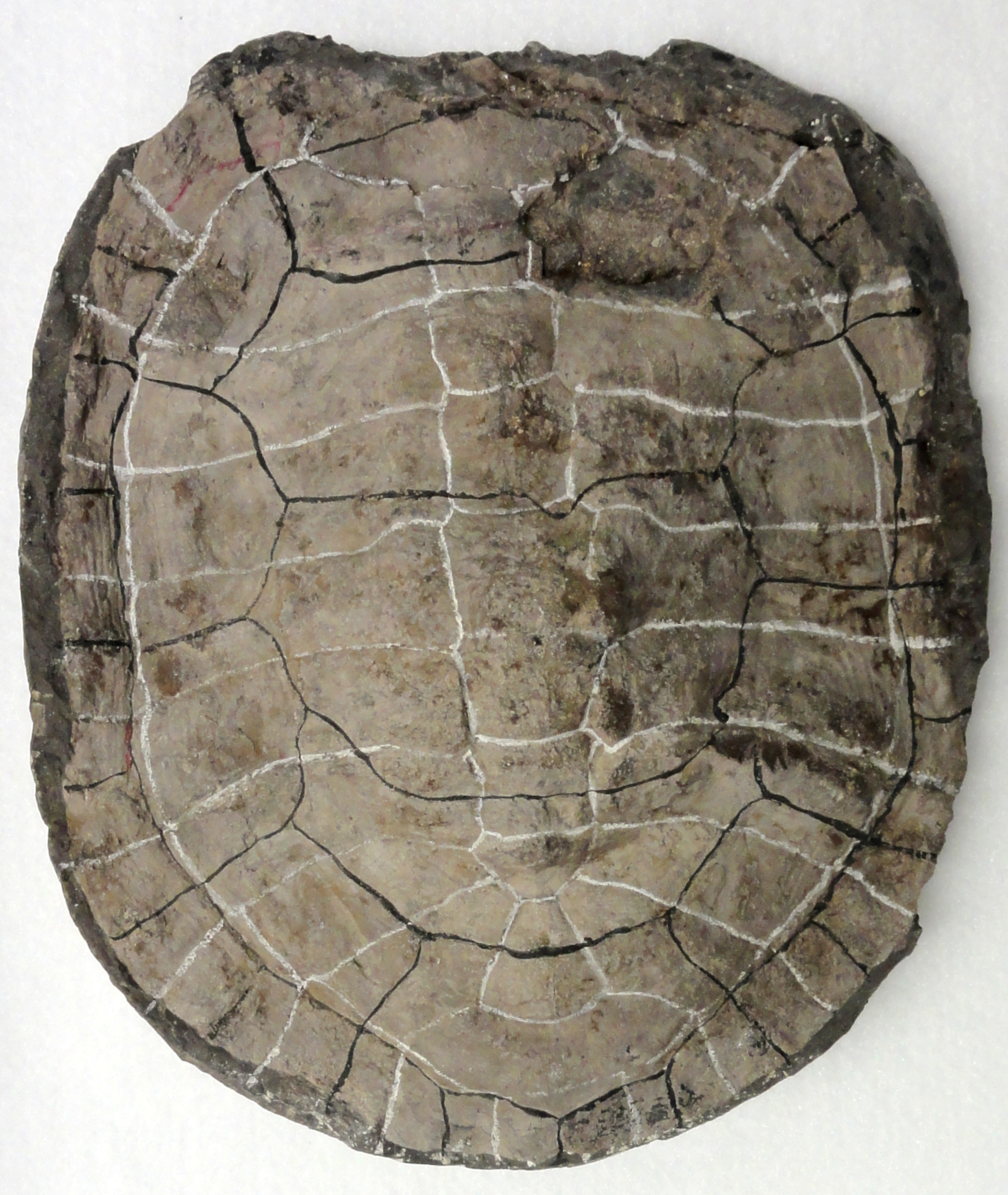
Acherontemys heckmani fossil carapace

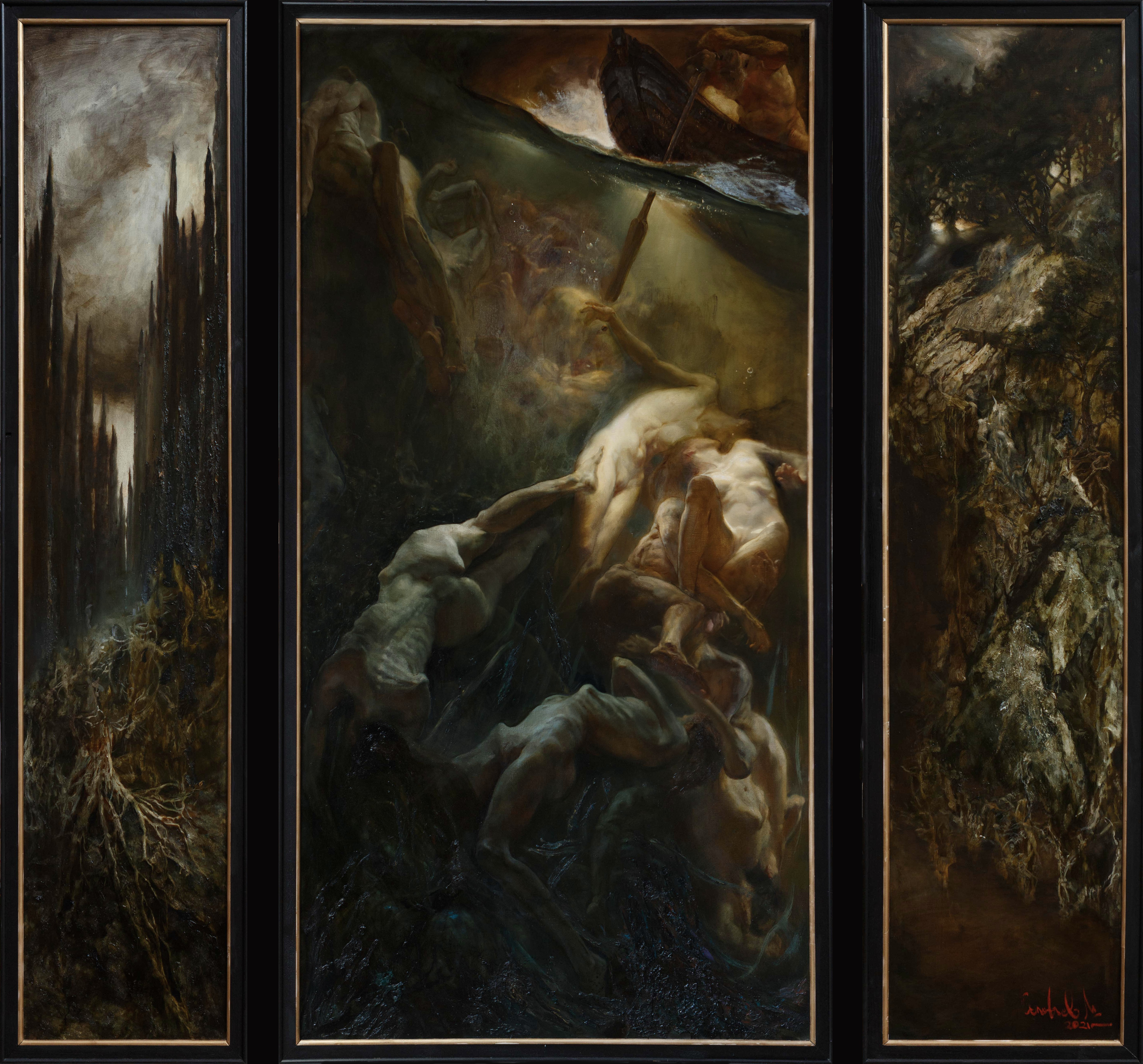
River of the Dead - a painting by Mikhail Sol
