= The Crown of Ptolemy =

2015 short story by Rick Riordan

- Author: Rick Riordan
- Language: English
- Genre: Fantasy novels
- Publisher: Disney Hyperion and Puffin Books
- Publication date: March 31, 2015
- Publication place: United States
- Media type: E-book, audio book, paperback
- Preceded by: The Staff of Serapis
- Followed by: The Hidden Oracle

The Crown of Ptolemy is the third and last book in the Percy Jackson & the Olympians and The Kane Chronicles crossover series. It was released in the back of the paperback version of The House of Hades on March 31, 2015, and later as an ebook and audiobook. The ebook edition was released on May 12, 2015.

== Development ==
On January 15, 2015, Rick Riordan announced a third crossover story titled The Crown of Ptolemy. His announcement included the fact that the short story would be first published in the paperback version of The House of Hades on March 31, 2015, along with a short story titled "Percy Jackson and the Sword of Hades", which had previously appeared in The Demigod Files. On March 3, 2015, he previewed the cover on Hypable, along with the information that the story would be for Percy Jackson's point of view. On April 27, he announced that the story would be released again on May 12 as an ebook or audiobook and would contain the first chapter of The Sword of Summer.

On October 5, 2015, during his book tour for The Sword of Summer, Rick Riordan announced a compilation of all the crossover stories titled Demigods and Magicians, released on April 5, 2016.

== Plot ==
Annabeth Chase dreams of her mother, Athena, telling her that there is trouble brewing. Annabeth and Percy Jackson take a ferry to Governors Island in New York Harbor. When they become trapped on the island by Setne (who is attempting to become a god using spells in the Book of Thoth), they try to contact Carter and Sadie Kane but fail. Annabeth and Percy decide to face Setne alone, but are immobilized by the magician. Setne summons the goddess Wadjet in order to consume her essence and take the Crown of Lower Egypt from her, becoming master of essentially one-half the Egyptian world. Setne then disappears.

The Kanes finally arrive and help the demigods track down Setne. Carter and Annabeth decide that they need to combine attacks to defeat him. Since Percy's sword has been absorbed by Setne, Carter gives Percy his wand, which turns into a kopis. Sadie and Annabeth teach each other a little magic, and Annabeth loans Carter her invisibility cap. When the quartet relocate Setne, he is trying to summon the goddess Nekhbet, guardian of the crown of Upper Egypt. Even with Nekhbet's help, they are unable to stop Setne from taking Nekhbet's crown, so the group retreats. Nekhbet insists that Setne must not be allowed to make himself a god and the four teens join forces with her.

After a brief discussion, Percy reluctantly agrees to let Nekhbet use him as a host in a last ditch attempt to defeat Setne. They attack Setne for the third time, playing to each other's strengths and Setne's vanity to keep the magician distracted. Carter casts a spell on Setne to trap him in a snow globe, and Nekhbet takes back her crown. Percy retrieves his sword, and Annabeth tells Sadie that she has begun to forget all the Egyptian magic she learned. Percy and Annabeth decide to not tell Camp Half-Blood about their adventure, fearing the consequences of mixing Greek and Egyptian magic, although the four do decide to keep in touch. The Kanes and Greek demigods then go their separate ways.

== Main characters ==
- Annabeth Chase – One of the four protagonists. She is the daughter of the Greek goddess Athena and a mortal history professor. She appears as a protagonist in both Percy Jackson & the Olympians in The Heroes of Olympus series. She appeared earlier in The Staff of Serapis.
- Percy Jackson – Another of the book's protagonists. He is the son of the Greek god Poseidon and Annabeth's boyfriend. He is the narrator of Percy Jackson and the Olympians and one of the protagonists of The Heroes of Olympus. He appeared earlier in The Son of Sobek. He and Annabeth Chase are dating.
- Carter Kane – The story's other male protagonist; an Egyptian magician and member of the House of Life. He is one of two narrators in The Kane Chronicles and appears in The Son of Sobek as one of the protagonists.
- Sadie Kane – The second female protagonist; an Egyptian magician and member of the House of Life. She is the other protagonist in The Kane Chronicles and is a main character in The Staff of Serapis. She is Carter Kane's sister.
- Setne – The story's antagonist. Setne, born in ancient Egypt, is an evil magician who seeks to become a god. He was previously seen in The Serpent's Shadow. He caused the chaos in The Son of Sobek and The Staff of Serapis.
- Nekhbet and Wadjet – The Egyptian goddesses of vultures and cobras, respectively. The pair were known as the "Two Ladies", and were the patrons of the united kingdom of Egypt. Nekhbet was patron of Upper Egypt; Wadjet the patron of Lower Egypt. Nekhbet previously appeared in The Throne of Fire and The Serpent's Shadow, acting as a minor antagonist in The Throne of Fire.

== Reception ==
Hypable highly praised the short story, writing "While previous installations, like "The Son of Sobek" and "The Staff of Serapis", have given us one small pairing at a time, "The Crown of Ptolemy" unites all four of our heroes, and it is brilliant. Sadie and Percy bond over their shared impatience, while Carter and Annabeth practically roll their eyes in synchronization. It is nice to see such a myriad of heroes joining with little resistance, more than happy to work in conjunction in order to defeat the bad guy."

After the release of The Crown of Ptolemy, the Percy Jackson and Kane Chronicles crossover series was on the New York Times Best Seller list for the weeks of May 31 and June 7, 2015. The Crown of Ptolemy itself was on the bestseller lists for USA Today (general list).
