= The Son of Sobek =

2013 spinoff the Percy Jackson and Kane Chronicles series

- Short story by Rick Riordan
- Cover art for The Son of Sobek
- Country: United States
- Genre: Fantasy short story

Publication
- Published in: English
- Publisher: Disney Hyperion and Puffin Books
- Media type: E-book, audio book, paperback, hardcover (April 5, 2016)
- Publication date: June 18, 2013

Chronology
- Series: The Kane Chronicles, The Heroes of Olympus, Percy Jackson & the Olympians
The Blood of Olympus, The Serpent's Shadow	The Staff of Serapis

The Son of Sobek is a 2013 fantasy short story written by Rick Riordan, first released in the paperback version of The Serpent's Shadow on May 7, 2013, and as a single e-book on June 18, 2013. On April 5, 2016, it was released as the first of three short stories in a hardcover novel entitled Demigods and Magicians: Percy and Annabeth Meet the Kanes.

== Plot ==
After hearing reports about magical disturbances in the Long Island area, as mentioned in The Serpent's Shadow, Carter Kane goes to investigate. He is unexpectedly swallowed by an enormous crocodile in the marshes at the edge of Moriches Bay on Long Island's south shore while exploring, but is saved by a strange older teenager who forces the monster to regurgitate him. The teenager turns out to be Percy Jackson.

After a brief disagreement that leave both confused about the other's origins, Percy and Carter decide to team up to deal with the monster, which has left them and is terrorizing a nearby suburban neighborhood. Carter hypothesizes that the beast is a petsuchos, a son of the god Sobek and thus immortal and invincible unless the enchanted necklace that it wears, which is invested with the power of Sobek, is removed. The two work together to remove the necklace from the animal, and save the neighborhood and its residents. After the necklace is removed, the monster shrinks into a baby crocodile and the heroes head to a diner to talk. Percy and Carter are guarded about what they share, but devise a way to contact each other again if needed. They go their separate ways, and Carter takes both the crocodile and necklace back to the 21st Nome for safekeeping.

== Characters ==
- Percy Jackson – Greek demigod who is the son of Poseidon.
- Carter Kane – A magician and sometimes a host of the falcon god Horus and descendant of both Narmer and Ramses the Great. He is a member of the House of Life. Brother to Sadie Kane.

== Sequels ==
A sequel, "The Staff of Serapis", was released on May 20, 2014, starring Annabeth Chase and Sadie Kane. A third crossover, "The Crown of Ptolemy" was released starring Annabeth, Carter, Sadie and Percy.
