= The Staff of Serapis =

2014 spinoff the Percy Jackson and Kane Chronicles series

- Short story by Rick Riordan
- Cover of The Staff of Serapis
- Country: United States
- Genre: Fantasy short story

Publication
- Published in: English
- Publisher: Disney Hyperion and Puffin Books
- Media type: paperback (April 8, 2014); E-book and audio book (May 20, 2014); hardcover (April 5, 2016)
- Publication date: April 8, 2014

Chronology
| The Son of Sobek | The Crown of Ptolemy |

The Staff of Serapis is the sequel to The Son of Sobek and the second book in the Percy Jackson and the Olympians/The Kane Chronicles crossover series. It was released in the back of the paperback version of The Mark of Athena on April 8, 2014 and as a single e-book and single audio book on May 20, 2014. On April 5, 2016, it was released as the second of three short stories in a hardcover novel entitled Demigods and Magicians: Percy and Annabeth Meet the Kanes.

== Plot ==
While on the subway after a failed internship interview, Annabeth Chase notices a monster with a wolf head and a lion head. As she does not have a weapon, she starts an argument between the two heads to keep it from hurting her or nearby mortals. Sadie Kane arrives, scares the beast off with some spells, and helps Annabeth recover from its poisonous aura.

Annabeth and Sadie introduce themselves, and, deciding that another monster with only a Labrador Retriever dog head must be connected to the first beast, team up. The two attempt to explain their worlds as they track down a god Annabeth remembers having something to do with the conglomerate monster they have encountered. They meet Serapis, a minor Egyptian god elevated to major importance by Ptolemy I Soter, originally a Greek general of Alexander the Great's who acquired the Egyptian sector of Alexander's empire upon his death and founded the last of the dynasties of Egypt, the Ptolemaic dynasty, ruling from Alexandria, the Mediterranean coastal city Alexander founded.

Serapis plots to destroy both the Greek and Egyptian pantheons. The two work together, experimenting by mixing together their particular brands of magic and defeat both Serapis and his wolf/lion/dog monster. The two exchange phone numbers and go their separate ways.

== Characters ==
- Sadie Kane – A member of the House of Life and Carter Kane's sister. She earlier appears in The Kane Chronicles as a protagonist and narrator. She is a magician and sometimes host to the Egyptian goddess Isis.
- Annabeth Chase – Daughter of the Greek goddess Athena and Percy Jackson's girlfriend. She appears in each of the author Rick Riordan's mythology series
