= The Serpent's Shadow =

The Serpent's Shadow could refer to:

- The Serpent's Shadow (Lackey novel), a fantasy novel by Mercedes Lackey
- The Serpent's Shadow (Riordan novel), a fantasy novel by Rick Riordan
