= The Ship of the Dead =

Third novel in the Magnus Chase and the Gods of Asgard series by Rick Riordan

- U.S. cover of first edition.
- Author: Rick Riordan
- Cover artist: John Rocco
- Language: English
- Series: Magnus Chase and the Gods of Asgard
- Release number: 3
- Genre: Fantasy, Norse mythology, young-adult
- Publisher: Disney Hyperion
- Publication date: October 3, 2017
- Publication place: United States
- Media type: Print (hardcover and paperback), audiobook, e-book
- Pages: 432
- ISBN: 978-1-4231-6093-9 (Hardcover)
- Preceded by: The Hammer of Thor

The Ship of the Dead is a young-adult fantasy novel based on Norse mythology written by American author Rick Riordan. It is the third and final novel in the Magnus Chase and the Gods of Asgard trilogy, preceded by The Hammer of Thor. It was released on October 3, 2017, by Disney-Hyperion, an imprint of Disney Book Group. The novel is narrated in the first-person view by Magnus Chase, 16-year-old demigod and homeless orphan. He and his crew sail to the farthest borders of Jotunheim and Niflheim in pursuit of Asgard's greatest threat.

== Plot summary ==
Magnus and Alex Fierro travel to the Chase Mansion, where they recover notes written by Randolph at different points in time. After reaching Valhalla, Magnus summons a ship gifted by his father Frey. Mallory Keen, Halfborn Gunderson, Thomas Jefferson Jr., Samirah al-Abbas and Alex accompany Magnus, while they plan to pick up Blitzen and Hearthstone along the way. The crew's conversation is heard by the Nine Billow Maidens, who take them to the court of Aegir, where they discover Hearth and Blitz are being held prisoner. Aegir's eldest daughter recognizes Magnus from his previous encounter with her mother Rán. Upon being threatened, Magnus swears by his troth to defeat Loki in a flyting contest and to avenge Aegir's humiliation, as Aegir was previously defeated by the god in a contest. Aegir invites them to escape while he isn't looking, but the crew is attacked by Aegir's nine daughters. They manage to escape with the help of Magnus' grandfather, Njord. Njord reveals to Magnus that the only way to defeat Loki is by drinking Kvasir's mead. The crew continue on their journey, with Blitz and Hearth travelling separately to retrieve Bolverk's whetstone.

As the crew heads to York, the backstories of the members are revealed. Mallory died disarming a bomb in Ireland; Halfborn died near Jorvik; TJ died after forcefully accepting a hopeless challenge, a trait inherited from his father Tyr. Samirah fasts during the Ramadan season. The crew arrives at York, where they duel with the giant Hrungnir for the location of Kvasir's mead. They get the information that they need: Kvasir's mead is in Jorvik, also known as Norway in the human realm. The crew goes to Norway, retrieves Kvasir's mead from Suttung's daughter, Gunnlöð, and kills Baugi. Suttung is killed single-handedly by Halfborn. They also learn that Naglfar is frozen between Niflheim and Jotunheim. They almost froze to death while travelling to Niflheim, but they are rescued by Skadi, Njord's ex-wife. Magnus drinks Kvasir's mead, and the crew goes to Naglfar. There, Magnus begins his flyting against Loki, but decides not to insult the god. Instead, he expresses the love and trust he has for his crew and pities Loki for his evident loneliness, as even his wife Sigyn abandons him. Loki shrinks to the size of a nut upon hearing Magnus's words, and he is imprisoned in a walnut given to Mallory earlier by Frigg. Magnus and his friends go to Vigridr, the Last Battlefield, and meet the gods, who congratulate them for defeating Loki and delaying Ragnarök. For this, Magnus is rewarded with a boon from Odin, and he asks Odin to lend him his lawyers so that he could convert Randolph's mansion into an orphanage and homeless shelter. He later recounts his adventure to Annabeth, who is crying due to recent events.

== Characters ==
- Magnus Chase (Beantown) - 16-year-old son of Frey who dies in the first few chapters but becomes an einherjar. He is Annabeth Chase's cousin, but last saw her when he was very young. He has healing and regeneration powers, resistance to extreme temperatures, and other magical abilities. As a human, he was asthmatic and weak, but gains extreme strength and endurance after his death.
- Samirah Al-Abbas (Sam) - The Valkyrie who brought Magnus to Hotel Valhalla. A daughter of Loki, she emigrated from Iraq with her family and is a descendant of a medieval Arab traveller and historian who wrote an important account about living among the Volga Vikings. She is stripped of her powers as a Valkyrie as a result of her choice to make Magnus an einherjar, but is reinstated by Odin himself. She is a practicing Muslim. She is a shapeshifter and carries an ax and a green hijab, which doubles as a camouflage cloak. She is engaged to Amir Fadlan, who works in a falafel shop.
- Hearthstone (Hearth) - A friend of Magnus. He is an alf (elf). He is deaf-mute, but speaks Alf Sign Language and can read lips. He had an abusive childhood, with parents who disliked him because of his disabilities. In exchange for working for Mimir, he received the ability to work rune magic.
- Blitzen (Blitz) - Another friend of Magnus, a svartalf (dwarf). He is the son of Freya. He and Hearth watched over Magnus while he was living in the streets. Blitz's father was killed by Fenris when he was a child, after an attempt to replace the Fenris Wolf's bindings. Blitz is unskilled at crafting (unusual for dwarves) but is a master fashion advisor. He, like Hearth, once worked for Mimir.
- Mallory Audrey Keen (Mack) - Mallory Keen was born in Belfast, Northern Ireland to Frigg and an unnamed man. Mallory had a poor relationship with her father due to his alcoholism. On 21 July 1972, which later became known as Bloody Friday, Loki disguised himself as one of Mallory's friends and tricked her into installing a car bomb on a school bus, claiming that soldiers were onboard instead of children. Her mother, Frigg, knowing Mallory would die, appeared to her disguised as an old hag and convinced her to disarm the bomb, giving her two knives. The car bomb blew up, killing Mallory, but since she died a heroic death with a weapon in her hand, she was taken to Valhalla.
- Halfborn Gunderson – A berserker extraordinaire, Gunderson left his hometown Flam to gain riches and glory and promised his mother he will be back to make their lives better. However, he never saw her again as she died in a mysterious fire. Halfborn Gunderson now fights as a Norse mercenary amongst his Enheirjar friends.
- Alex Fierro – Alex's family is influential, which first attracted Loki's attention, causing him to seduce Alex's father in the form of a "voluptuous redhead" woman. Nine months later, the female form of Loki left him with a child. The family didn't take the news well, especially after Loki permanently "opened their eyes" and made them aware of the Nine Worlds and the Norse gods. Alex spent her/his life being resented for her/his Norse heritage and for her/his ability to shapeshift between the two sexes, which was thought to be Loki's fault. Only her/his grandfather accepted her/him for who she/he was, and taught her/him how to make pottery. About two years before becoming an einherji, Alex became homeless and began to wander the streets of Boston. At some point in life, he/she lived in a youth shelter on Winter Street in Boston, at roughly the same time when Magnus was there. He/She remembers hating the place.
- Thomas Jefferson Jr. – The son of Tyr, who died in a battle fighting during the Civil War. He also lives in Valhalla on the same floor as Magnus and all his friends.

== Development ==
Rick Riordan announced The Ship of the Dead on the same day of the release of The Hammer of Thor, the second book of the Magnus Chase and the Gods of Asgard trilogy. According to him, this would be the last book in the series.

An iTunes preview containing the first three chapters of the book was released on September 17, 2017. The cover, illustrated by John Rocco, was released on April 26, 2017, and a trailer was published on YouTube on October 2, 2017. To promote The Ship of the Dead, Riordan went on a nine-day tour around the United States beginning on October 3, 2017.

== Release ==
The Ship of the Dead was released in the United States by Disney-Hyperion on October 3, 2017. An audiobook, narrated by Michael Crouch, was published on the same date by Books on Tape. The book also received e-book and paperback versions, and has been translated into 11 languages to date.

The Ship of the Dead sold over 57,000 copies during the first week. By the end of 2017, it sold over 219,000 copies. Upon release, the book ranked No. 2 on USA Today's bestseller list and was considered one of the best books of the year by Barnes & Noble. It also won the Goodreads Choice Award for Middle Grade & Children's of 2017.
