= Red Pyramid (disambiguation) =

The Red Pyramid is the largest of the three major pyramids at Dashur, Egypt.

Red Pyramid may also refer to:

- The Red Pyramid, a 2010 novel by Rick Riordan
- Red Pyramid (Silent Hill), or Pyramid Head, a monster in the Silent Hill video game franchise
