= The Hammer of Thor =

2016 book by Rick Riordan

- U.S. cover of first edition.
- Author: Rick Riordan
- Cover artist: John Rocco
- Series: Magnus Chase and the Gods of Asgard
- Release number: 2
- Genre: Fantasy, Norse mythology, Young adult
- Publisher: Disney Hyperion
- Publication date: October 4, 2016
- Publication place: United States
- Media type: Print (hardcover, paperback), audiobook, e-book
- Pages: 528
- ISBN: 9781423160922
- Preceded by: The Sword of Summer
- Followed by: The Ship of the Dead

The Hammer of Thor is an American young-adult fantasy novel based on Norse mythology written by Rick Riordan. It was published on October 4, 2016 as a hardcover, audiobook, and ebook, and is the second book in the Magnus Chase and the Gods of Asgard series.

The novel takes place six weeks after the events of the preceding story, The Sword of Summer, and chronicles Magnus Chase's quest to retrieve the missing hammer of Thor and prevent Loki's rise to power. Since its release, the novel has been translated into 15 languages, and re-released in a boxed set and as a paperback.

The Hammer of Thor received positive reviews from critics, who praised its inclusion of diverse characters such as the genderfluid character Alex Fierro, Muslim Samirah al-Abbas, and deaf-mute Hearthstone, but also noted its trite and repetitive plot that did not help readers progress through the series' overall story arc. The book won the 2017 Stonewall Book Award for Children's literature for its portrayal of Alex as was a Goodreads Choice Awards nominee for 2016. A sequel, The Ship of the Dead, was released on October 3, 2017.

== Plot summary ==
The book opens six weeks after the close of the preceding novel, The Sword of Summer. Magnus Chase meets with Samirah "Sam" al-Abbas and Otis, one of the god Thor's two goats, who inform the heroes that Thor's hammer is still missing. The jötnar are beginning to suspect Thor does not have his weapon to defend Midgard and plan to invade. Magnus returns to Hotel Valhalla to rest and prepare, where he meets Alex Fierro, Sam's newest einherji recruit and a transgender/genderfluid child of Loki. While in Valhalla, Magnus has dreamlike visions of Loki manipulating his uncle Randolph. Loki also tells Magnus about a wedding between Samirah and the giant Thrym in five days and says that Magnus will need to bring the bride-price. Magnus, Sam, and their friends Blitzen and Hearthstone travel to the Provincetown barrow but discover the Skofnung Sword instead of Thor's hammer. Loki appears and tells the quartet that the sword and matching whetstone will be Sam's bride-price. They are reluctant to help Loki, who causes Randolph to wound Blitzen with the sword.

Because wounds caused by the sword can only be healed by its whetstone, the four are forced to hunt for the stone. Hearth, Magnus, and a petrified Blitz travel to Alfheim. There, Magnus learns the stone is in the possession of Hearth's father, Alderman. Alderman insists Hearth repay a wergild he owes because Alderman resents Hearth for being unable to prevent his younger brother Andiron's death at the hands of a Brunnmigi before he may take the stone. Magnus and Hearthstone track down a dwarf named Andvari and force him to give them his treasure, which they use to repay Hearth's debt. With the stone, they heal Blitzen. After escaping Alderman, who has been driven insane by Andvari's cursed ring, the trio returns to Midgard. With Alex and Sam, Magnus visits the god Heimdall to locate Utgard-Loki. Rejoining Blitz and Hearth, Magnus's quest group then travels to Utgard-Loki. After completing some tasks to prove their worth, the giant king tells them Thrym has Thor's hammer to be given to the bride as part of the traditional Norse wedding ritual and helps them track Thrym. Utgard-Loki also reveals that, according to Norse rituals, the father of the bride (i.e., Loki) will receive the Skofnung Sword which can free Loki from his cave. To retrieve the hammer and stop the giants' invasion of Midgard, the quest group must go through with the wedding and deliver the Skofnung Sword to Loki.

The goddess Sif arrives and transports the mortals to Asgard. They explain the situation to Thor, who agrees to help them trick Thrym and retrieve the hammer. Since Sam is already betrothed, Alex volunteers to act as the bride because she (Note: Alex chooses to go by both the pronouns he and she depending on which gender she is identifying with. She explicitly chooses not to use they.) is a daughter of Loki. The group travels to the cave where Loki is bound. Although they find the hammer, Loki forces Randolph to use the Skofnung Sword to cut his bonds. Magnus's hallmates and a group of gods arrive and defeat the giants, but Loki escapes, and Randolph is killed by the spirits of the sword. The mortals and einherjar return to Hotel Valhalla and are told by Helgi their next mission will be to find and attempt to recapture Loki, who has gone to find the boat Naglfar. Magnus contacts his cousin Annabeth to ask for help from her boyfriend Percy Jackson, son of Poseidon.

=== Characters ===
- Magnus Chase – einherji son of the Norse god Frey and the human Natalie Chase. He is gifted with healing powers and resistance to extreme temperatures, and works with the sword Sumarbrander.
- Samirah "Sam" al-Abbas – Valkyrie daughter of Loki and a human doctor. Sam is Muslim and hopes to become an aircraft pilot. She also performs special side missions for the god Odin.
- Alex Fierro – a genderfluid einherji, whose mother was Loki. Throughout the novel, the character is referred to as either "he" or "she" depending on her current gender, rather than with a mix of pronouns or the singular they, and Alex has stated that she prefers she/her pronouns unless stated otherwise. Alex enjoys pottery and uses a pottery wire-turned garrote as a weapon and also shapeshifts, like her mother.
- Blitzen "Blitz" – a dwarf and the son of the dwarf Bilì and the goddess Freya, making him Magnus's cousin. Blitz owns and operates a fashionwear store called "Blitzen's Best" in Boston.
- Hearthstone "Hearth" – an elf, son of the influential elf Alderman. He is deaf-mute – which his parents always resented, especially after the death of their younger son Andiron. He speaks Alf Sign Language and uses magic by casting runestones.
- Jack (Sumarbrander) – formerly the sword of Frey, now in possession of the god's son Magnus. Sumarbrander chose the name "Jack" when Magnus took possession of him. The sword is capable of fighting, talking, and flying about on its own, but the next person to hold it experiences fatigue as a result of Jack's actions.
- Randolph Chase – Magnus's uncle. Loki blackmails Randolph into helping him by promising to bring back the man's deceased wife and daughters.

== Composition and marketing ==
Before the release of The Sword of Summer, the first book in his series Magnus Chase and the Gods of Asgard, author Rick Riordan had plans to publish a trilogy, while acknowledging that Percy Jackson was planned as a trilogy. The sequel was teased in the back pages of The Sword of Summer, the first novel in the series.

Entertainment Weekly released an excerpt of the first chapter and the cover of The Hammer of Thor on April 28, 2016, along with an interview with Riordan. Penguin Books Australia also released a book trailer for The Hammer of Thor on YouTube on September 25, 2016. The trailer is an animated short with a narration explaining the concept of Yggdrasil. To promote The Hammer of Thor, Riordan went on a nine-day tour in the United States beginning October 4, 2016. The tour promoted both the new novel and Riordan's new imprint Rick Riordan Presents.

Riordan also attended the Iowa Book Festival on October 7, where he announced the title of the third book in Magnus Chase and the Gods of Asgard series, The Ship of the Dead. In a radio interview conducted in Iowa City, Riordan discussed his character choices and the kinds of themes he wanted to present in the series, including increased awareness of Muslim-American issues, and his inspiration and writing method. He also highlighted the differences between his approach to Norse mythology and that of other popular media series such as the Marvel Cinematic Universe, which he described as "fast and loose".

== Release ==
The Hammer of Thor was first published as a hardcover in the United States on October 4, 2016, with cover illustration by John Rocco and interior rune illustrations by Michelle Gengaro-Kokmen. Ebook and audiobook editions were released the same day. The audiobook is read by actor Kieran Culkin and published by Listening Library.

The Hammer of Thor sold more than 58,000 copies during the first week. Upon release, the book ranked No. 1 on The New York Times bestseller list, No. 2 on the Publishers Weekly bestseller list, and No. 3 on the USA Today bestseller list, remaining on the former for 17 weeks (being in the first position for three weeks immediately after its release). It peaked at No. 6 in the Amazon's Children's Bestsellers list in the United Kingdom the week of its publication. It peaked at No. 5 on the Los Angeles Times list and remained in it for eight weeks. By the end of 2016, the book sold more than 298,000 copies.

In the United Kingdom and Australia, English-language editions in hardcover were also released October 4 by Puffin Books. A paperback edition was released by Puffin on October 5, 2017. To date, editions have also been released in Spanish, French, Chinese, German, Italian, Polish, Portuguese, Dutch, Swedish, Finnish, Czech, Danish, Bulgarian, Turkish, and Hebrew. Although many non-English editions used John Rocco's cover art, a few – and the Puffin editions – have unique covers by other illustrators.

The book was recommended as a holiday gift by the Los Angeles Times. On January 1, 2017, The Hammer of Thor returned to the newspaper bestseller list at No. 19, and to No. 7 on the Publishers Weekly bestseller list in March 2017. The book received a Lexile score of 690L, making it age- and difficulty-appropriate for the average 8-13 year-old.

== Reception ==
The novel received positive reviews, many of which praised Riordan's newly diverse characters. Maggie Reagan of Booklist wrote, "Riordan combines Norse mythology with a number of social issues: [gender fluidity, disability, and race and religion]", calling the book "a surefire hit". Kirkus Reviews gave The Hammer of Thor a starred review and praised the interposed religious and sexual complexity in the Norse mythological world introduced using characters such as Alex and Samirah, while also writing that Magnus is a distinct character when compared with Riordan's other protagonists. Hypable praised the depth of the storyline, the characters' diversity – particularly Alex Fierro – and the familial love between the characters.

Todd Kleiboer of The East Texan, the student newspaper of Texas A&M University-Commerce, claimed that although Riordan does well to include such diverse characters as the Muslim Samirah and genderfluid Alex, the author runs the risk of making his readers believe such characters are representative of their "group" by portraying only one example of each "type" of person. He continues, "Young adult readers may have no contact with the Muslim or transgender population outside of literature, and most will take Samirah or Alex as representatives. However, Riordan counters this by portraying characters that do not fall into stereotypes and perhaps illuminate the diversity of people on Midgard–or Earth."

Despite the praise for Riordan's new diversity, reviewers criticized other aspects of the novel. Claire Yu of the Central Times said in her review, "I want to thank Rick Riordan for giving us such a diverse set of characters, and how he emphasizes on the importance of other cultures", but also said she feels the "special something" of Riordan's typical humor writing is missing from the book. She calls the plot "repetitive" and "not ... filled with the same energy and vigour as its predecessors". Fantasy Literature similarly praised the book's sensitive approach to delicate issues and its continuation of Riordan's humorous style but criticized the book for its small part in expanding the over-reaching plot of the series. Common Sense Media, which gave the book four stars out of five, praised the continued inclusion of diverse characters and storylines but criticized the lack of character development for Magnus.

The Hammer of Thor won the Stonewall Book Award for Children's Literature, which are granted to works of merit for children or teenagers relating to LGBTQ experience. The award was granted for the depiction of the genderfluid teenage character Alex Fierro. When asked about his decision to include Alex, Riordan said, "There’s lots of kinds of kids out there, and my feeling is that all of them deserve to be able to see themselves in stories". An official announcement by the American Library Association said, "Alex is a hero and represents the expansive possibilities of gender for future generations". The novel was also nominated for Best Middle Grade & Children's Book of 2016 in the Goodreads Choice Awards, and ended in third place, behind The Hidden Oracle (another book by Riordan) and Pax.

== Sequel ==
The sequel, The Ship of the Dead, was released on October 3, 2017. The book ranked No. 2 on USA Today's bestseller list after its release and was considered one of the best books of the year by Barnes & Noble. It also won the 2017 Goodreads Choice Award for Middle Grade & Children's. On October 17, 2017, the three books of the series were released as a boxed set.
