= The Sword of Summer =

Young-adult fantasy novel by Rick Riordan

- First edition
- Author: Rick Riordan
- Cover artist: John Rocco
- Language: English
- Series: Magnus Chase and the Gods of Asgard
- Release number: 1
- Genre: Fantasy, Norse mythology, young-adult
- Publisher: Disney Hyperion
- Publication date: October 6, 2015
- Publication place: United States
- Media type: Print (hardcover and paperback), audiobook, e-book
- Pages: 513
- ISBN: 978-1-4231-6091-5
- OCLC: 994762497
- LC Class: PZ7.R4829 Sw 2015
- Followed by: The Hammer of Thor

The Sword of Summer is a young-adult fantasy novel based on Norse mythology written by American author Rick Riordan. It was published on October 6, 2015, by Disney Hyperion, and is the first novel in the Magnus Chase and the Gods of Asgard series.

The novel is narrated in the first-person view by Magnus Chase, 16-year-old demigod and homeless orphan and after his death he arrives in a Norse afterlife as an Einherji, Magnus discovers that he is the son of the Norse deity, Frey, and must stop Fenris Wolf from leaving his prison and ending the world.

The Sword of Summer received positive reviews from critics, who praised its plot, humor, the inclusion of diverse characters, and mature themes, but also noted its failure to rise above the author's previous work. The book has appeared on The New York Times children's Best Seller list and the Amazon best-seller list. It won the 2015 Goodreads Choice Award for Middle Grade and Children's Fiction. A sequel, The Hammer of Thor, was released on October 4, 2016. Since its release, the novel has been translated into 9 languages.

== Plot ==
The novel opens on the sixteenth birthday of protagonist Magnus Chase, who has been living on the streets of Boston since his mother died.

Magnus Chase's uncle, Frederick, and cousin, Annabeth, have unexpectedly come to search for him. In the meantime, Magnus breaks into his uncle Randolph's house to look for answers. Catching Magnus in the act, Randolph drives him to Longfellow Bridge, revealing that Magnus is the son of a Norse god. This makes him the target of an unnamed magical enemy.

Randolph explains that Magnus must magically retrieve an ancient sword known as Sumarbrander (or the "Sword of Summer"), which is hidden in Boston Harbor, to protect himself. Suddenly, a fire giant named Surt appears and starts destroying the bridge. In an attempt to save the other pedestrians, Magnus confronts Surt with the sword. As he realizes he might die, he manages to wound the giant and hurls him off the bridge. Unfortunately, Magnus dies upon striking the water.

Magnus awakens in a place called Hotel Valhalla as an einherjar, where he is told he will spend eternity training for Ragnarök. He is introduced to the Valkyrie who brought him to Valhalla, Sam, and to his new einherjar hallmates. During Magnus' welcome feast, the three Norns pronounce Magnus a son of Frey and deliver a confusing prophecy. The hotel's ruling council banishes Sam the Valkyrie for apparently "wrongly choosing" Magnus. That night, Magnus's friends Hearth and Blitz arrive and reveal they are an elf and dwarf, respectively. They convince him to leave the hotel. In Midgard, the trio joins up with Sam. The group meets with the god Mimir, who tasks them with finding the Sword before Surt and bringing it to the island of Fenris Wolf. They retrieve the sword from the sea goddess Ran and journey to Nidavellir to secure a new binding for the Wolf. During the quest, Magnus experiences dream-visions of Loki, and once even of the goddess Hel offering to reunite him with his late mother—a proposal he struggles to refuse.

After a detour to Jotunheim, where they help the god Thor and Magnus discovers new magical powers, they finally arrive at Fenris's island. Despite being attacked by a group of Valkyries, some of Magnus' hallmates, and Surt, they successfully rebind the Wolf. Magnus has a brief vision of his father Frey before returning to Hotel Valhalla to stand trial for his disobedience. Before he can be punished, however, Magnus's hallmate X stands and reveals himself to be the god Odin, in disguise. Odin rewards each of the heroes, finally offering Magnus a chance to return to life or choose a different afterlife. Magnus declines but returns to Boston to speak with his cousin Annabeth. The two hold a funeral for Natalie Chase and exchange stories of each other's lives as demigods. Meanwhile, in the epilogue, Loki punishes Randolph for being unable to stop Magnus from rebinding Fenris. Loki implies that Randolph's family will be in danger if the man does not cooperate.

== Characters ==
- Magnus Chase – A 16-year-old son of Frey who dies in the first few chapters but becomes an einherjar. He is Annabeth Chase's cousin, but he last saw her when he was very young. He has healing and regeneration powers, resistance to extreme temperatures, and other magical abilities. As a human, he is asthmatic and weak but gains extreme strength and endurance after his death.
- Samirah "Sam" al-Abbas – The Valkyrie who brought Magnus to Hotel Valhalla. A daughter of Loki, she emigrated from Iraq with her family and is a descendant of a medieval Arab traveler and historian who wrote an important account about living among the Volga Vikings. She is a practicing Muslim, a shapeshifter, and carries an axe and a green hijab, which doubles as a camouflage cloak. She is engaged to Amir Fadlan, who works in a falafel shop.
- Hearthstone "Hearth" – A friend of Magnus. He is an alf (elf). He is deaf-mute, but speaks Alf Sign Language and can read lips. He had an abusive childhood, with parents who disliked him because of his disabilities. He received the ability to work rune magic in return for great sacrifice.
- Blitzen "Blitz" – Another friend of Magnus, a svartalf (dwarf). He is the son of Freya. He and Hearth watched over Magnus while he was living in the streets. Blitz's father was killed by Fenris when he was a child, after an attempt to replace the Fenris Wolf's bindings. Blitz is unskilled at crafting (unusual for dwarves) but is a master fashion advisor. He, like Hearth, works for Mimir.
- X/Odin – A half-troll that is one of Magnus' hallmates, X is later revealed to be Odin in disguise, to inspect the einherjar without them knowing. Sam brought X to Valhalla when he died dismantling a dog-fighting ring. He is called X because his real name is difficult to pronounce.
- Jack (Sumarbrander) – The title character of the book (Sumarbrander is Norse for "sword of summer"), a magic sword that can talk and once belonged to Frey until he gave it up and lost its allegiance. Magnus retrieved it from Boston Harbor, won its allegiance, and nicknamed it Jack. He can take the form of a pendant and move on his own.

=== Prophecy ===
The prophecy that was given to Magnus by the Norns reads:

Wrongly chosen, wrongly slain,
A hero Valhalla cannot contain.
Nine days hence the sun must go east,
Ere Sword of Summer unbinds the beast.

The first line of the prophecy was initially taken as confirmation that Magnus was unfit for duty as an einherjar; later, Odin interprets it to mean that Loki chose the wrong hero to manipulate. The second line refers to how Magnus manages to leave Valhalla despite claims that the hotel is impossible to escape. The final two lines describe how Sumarbrander was fated to free Fenris (as it did before rebinding him), and how the one day of the year when Fenris' island can be reached by a mortal was exactly nine days from the date the prophecy was given.

== Composition and marketing ==
During Riordan's book tour for The House of Hades, he announced that he was writing a Norse mythology series that would take place in Boston. He also stated that his plans for the setting were unrelated to his recent move to the city, although living in Boston made researching for the series less difficult. On September 23, 2014, Riordan broadcast a webcast from the Empire State Building and announced the name of the series: Magnus Chase and the Gods of Asgard.

The title of the first book, The Sword of Summer, was revealed in the final page of The Blood of Olympus. On June 18, 2015, the cover and the second chapter were released on USA Today. The first five chapters were revealed on September 28, 2015. To prepare readers for the new book, Riordan posted images of Norse vocabulary words on his Twitter account starting August 28, 2015, along with the hashtag #norsecrashcourse. Words such as Valhalla, Ragnarok, and Yggdrasil were all included and defined.

In the months preceding The Sword of Summer's publication, Disney-Hyperion and Rick Riordan advertised even more heavily for the new book. Riordan embarked on a tour across the U.S., speaking to hundreds of fans on each stop of his tour. An online myth-writing competition was sponsored by Scholastic just before the novel's publication, with the grand prize of a "virtual visit" from Rick Riordan. Finally, Riordan signed 10,000 copies of The Sword of Summer, to be distributed on Black Friday at Barnes & Noble stores nationwide, as yet another massive advertising campaign.

== Release ==
The Sword of Summer was first published as a hardcover in the United States on October 6, 2015, with cover illustration by John Rocco and interior rune illustrations by Michelle Gengaro-Kokmen. It had a first printing of 2.5 million hardcover copies in the United States. Ebook editions were published worldwide on the same date, available through the print edition publishers or ebook distributors such as Kindle. An audiobook was released October 6 by Listening Library in the U.S.

The Sword of Summer debuted as No. 1 on the New York Times Children's Middle-Grade Hardcover Best Sellers list and has remained there for 36 weeks as of June 30, 2016. It was also #3 on Amazon's best-selling Children's Books list for 2015.

Many publishers in other countries - including Puffin Books in the UK - released hardcover editions on October 6, or shortly thereafter. An audiobook edition was released by Penguin Random House Audio in the UK. An audiobook in German was released in 2016. To date, editions have been published in English, Spanish, Italian, Portuguese, French, Polish, Turkish, Dutch, Bulgarian, and Finnish. The majority of foreign-language editions have been published with the same U.S. cover art, but a few boast unique illustrations not done by illustrator John Rocco.

The book received a Lexile score of 630L, making it age- and difficulty-appropriate for the average 9-13-year-old. On Scholastic, the book is recommended to teachers as appropriate material for grades 6-8 and 9–12.

== Reception ==
The Sword of Summer has been very well received since its publication. Maggie Reagan of Booklist warned readers and booksellers to "buy extra copies, and prepare for the siege. ...Riordan has the magic touch..." School Library Journal explained the book's success with its comment: "With an epic plot, engaging (and diverse) characters, and tons of wise-cracking humor, Riordan’s latest is a page-turner. ...fans of his previous works will [also] be happy to see clever nods and references to the other in-universe books." While reviewer Jody Mitori said Riordan's pop culture "references may date the book in years to come", she went on to assert that "for now, they make the trek entertaining". Among overall children's book sales in 2015, The Sword of Summer did very well, but was not a "big front-runner" among other bestselling books.

The Sword of Summer has been praised especially as an excellent example of a Riordan novel. Kirkus Reviews, for example, wrote, "First there were the Greek gods, then the Egyptian gods, then the Roman gods—now Riordan takes on the Norse gods. ...A fast-paced, eventful, and largely successful pivot." More specific aspects of the novel have also been noted by critics. Author Cassandra Clare's review, praised "Riordan's effervescent world-building", in addition to the novel's humour and breakneck plot. Author Michael Grant lauded the novel as "a propulsive, kinetic, witty rebooting of Norse mythology with all the charm of the Percy Jackson novels." KidsReads's review praised the characters and their development, saying "Magnus Chase feels fresh and exciting" even with its oft-used mythological themes. Reviewers such as Publishers Weekly have praised the book, saying, "Riordan plays much of the material for laughs...and brings the Norse gods into the 21st century... The sensibility is right in line with the Percy Jackson novels, and the audience will be just as large."

A few reviews—most notably Adam Gopnik's in The New York Times—have expressed disappointment at the novel's failure to rise above Riordan's previous work, however. Gopnik's review acknowledged the difficulties modern-myth authors like Riordan face in writing for a young audience; such as the "required" action scenes, fantastic powers, and drama; but went on to question Riordan's inadequate portrayal of "the special quiddity that separates Norse mythology from other kinds...its fatalism". A similar review from the St. Louis Post-Dispatch asserted that "at nearly 500 pages, Sword of Summer is too long" and loses some of its charms from the overuse of "quests-within-a-quest". While Gopnik and others accept The Sword of Summer as of passable quality and certain to appeal to many readers, Gopnik summarizes their views in his review's concluding lines: "The marvels of myth Riordan recreates here as before; the mystery of myth remains unactualized in his work or, sadder and more likely, unasked for by his time."

On a more positive note, some critics appreciated Riordan's new turn towards multiculturalism. Other reviewers have shown interest in Riordan's choice to kill his main character and other signs of his newest story being more mature than the famous Percy Jackson & the Olympians. Kirkus praised Riordan's interesting choice to make the main female protagonist, Samirah al-Abbas, happily betrothed—and thus "blessedly free of romantic tension" with Magnus. The Sword of Summer won the Goodreads Choice Award for the Middle Grade and Children's Fiction of 2015.

== Sequel ==
A sequel, The Hammer of Thor was released on October 4, 2016.
