= Swim That Rock =

2014 book by John Rocco and Jay Primiano

- First edition
- Author: Jay Primiano and John Rocco
- Illustrator: John Rocco
- Genre: Young adult fiction
- Publisher: Candlewick Press
- Publication date: 2014 (hardcover); 2017 (paperback)
- Publication place: United States
- Media type: Hardcover, paperback, ebook
- Pages: 293 p. (hardcover); 305 p. (paperback)
- ISBN: 9780763669058

Swim That Rock is a book by John Rocco, a children's author/illustrator, and Jay Primiano, former Charlestown Parks & Recreation Director. It was published by Candlewick Press in 2014 and is Primiano's first book. Its lexile score of 750L makes it appropriate for readers aged 12–18 years.

Swim that Rock follows a teenager named Jake Cole after his father disappears while at sea. Jake must work as a fisherman to help his family repay a loan, or else face moving away from his New England home. The book was positively received by critics. Although reviewers note the predictable nature of the story and unoriginal language, the book has been lauded as an authentic portrait of life in coastal Rhode Island and an "entertaining coming-of-age story".

== Development ==
The novel was inspired by the shared experiences of the two authors John Rocco and Jay Primiano, both of whom grew up in Rhode Island. Rocco (then 11) met Primiano (then 19) when the latter was repairing his boat at a mutual friend's home, and got a job working for Primiano as a fisherman. The two remained friends even after pursuing different careers. Primiano became a poet, living in Jamestown, Rhode Island; Rocco pursued a career as a children's book illustrator (and later, author) and moved to Los Angeles, California.

Rocco approached Primiano about collaborating on a book sometime in 2004, although the two did not actually start writing Swim that Rock until 2008. Living far apart, the two first collaborated via email, with Primiano sending approximately 4000 words a day to Rocco for him to "cull through...[and] pick out the literary pearls". Eventually, Rocco and Primiano rented a house in Mystic, Connecticut, to collaborate in-person and finished their first manuscript. They had difficulty securing a publisher until Rocco spoke to Candlewick Press president Karen Lotz, who finally took up the book. At the time, Rocco was working on several illustration projects with the publisher. The book was edited even further before publication in April 2014.

The book's title is derived from a time when Rocco was working for Primiano on the latter's boat. Primiano, looking to challenge his companion, gave Rocco a large rock to swim to a neighboring boat some 200 yards away, ostensibly because the other boat's captain needed it to build a rock wall around his home. In the novel, Jake asks Gene Hassard (one of Jake's father's friends) if Gene will initiate him by making him "swim with a rock". The older man replies that Jake already has "[his] own rock to swim", which becomes a metaphor for the boy's difficulties throughout the book. Other events in the novel are also based on real-life experiences of either Rocco or Primiano, as are a number of characters. In particular, the book's Gene Hassard is based on Primiano's first boss, Gene Beebe. The fishermen and diner workers as well were based on real people from the pair's lives, albeit more generally.

The authors stated that they were working on a sequel continuing Jake Cole's story as early as June 2014.

== Publication ==
Swim that Rock was first published as a hardcover and ebook on April 8, 2014. A paperback edition is scheduled to be released April 11, 2017 with slightly different cover art.

The authors embarked on a 12-day tour to promote the book shortly after its publication in 2014. They visited several towns in Rhode Island, Connecticut, and Massachusetts, including Primiano's home of Jamestown. The tour included a launch party, book signings at regional booksellers, and visits to local middle schools where the authors (clad in fluorescent orange waders) explained the principles behind clamming. Rocco and Primiano also held a second tour in May 2015, visiting similar locations.

The book's Lexile score is 750L, making it appropriate for children ages 12–18, or those at or above the seventh grade-level.

== Plot summary ==
The book takes place in Warren, Rhode Island, in 1982, and centers around 14-year-old Jake Cole's quest to find his father, who went missing at sea. Like his father, Jake is a fisherman and quahogger in Narragansett Bay. The Cole family owns a small diner called the Riptide, but is in danger of losing the business because of a large debt owed to a local mafia loan shark. When his mother suggests that the family give up on the diner and move in with relatives in Arizona, Jake determines to repay the loan any way he can, thus giving him a chance to find his father (whom everyone else believes is dead). After a run of bad luck, Jake resorts to illegal night-fishing with a mysterious man called "Captain", but must contend with a game warden paid off by the mob. Although ultimately successful in saving the diner, Jake is deeply affected by the new experience of providing for his family.

=== Characters ===
- Jake is a very tall, lanky teenager. He catches quahogs in his free time and considers himself more fit at sea than on land.
- Tommy is Jake's recycling-obsessed friend.
- Jake's mother is the owner of a restaurant named the Riptide. She has been struggling with depression since her husband died and the mafia threatened to close her business and repossess her home.
- Darcy is Jake's crush. Her arm is scarred from a fire that burned down her house.
- Gene is Jake's adult friend who he goes quahogging with, and a friend of Jake's dad. He gets injured early on and is in the hospital for much of the book.
- Captain – A secretive pirate whom Jake ends up working for. He often does things on the very edge of the law.
- Vito is the local mafia boss. He controls several businesses locally as a loan shark.
- Delvecchio is the typical bad cop figure. He tries to stop Jake and Captain and is really working for Vito.
- Robin is a twenty-something-year-old woman who works at the Riptide. She sings well but feels embarrassed in front of audiences.
- Trax is a friend and brother figure to Jake. His parents are Native American and Irish and he is described as "probably the only Indian with freckles."

== Reception ==
Although the novel was not a bestseller, it has been favorably received by critics. Library Media Connection claimed that it "will be sure to please middle school boys who are looking for an engaging read". John Freeman Gill's generally positive review for The New York Times especially praised illustrator John Rocco's pencil drawings and maps, comparing them to E. H. Shepard's work in the Winnie-the-Pooh books. One of the most effusive reviews came from author Rick Riordan, John Rocco's longtime collaborator. Riordan lauded the novel's well-executed descriptions of its setting, a sentiment shared by numerous other reviewers.

Many reviewers note the predictability of the book's plot as its main downfall, and cite the vivid, unusual setting as the main reason for its success. For instance, the Kirkus Reviews review of Swim that Rock reads, "while the distinct, clearly realized setting details distinguish this title from the vast schools of novels for young teens swimming in the publishing sea, choppy pace and perfunctory dialogue drag it down to the ocean floor." A review by Publishers Weekly similarly remarked on the book's familiar "framework", but praised its "overall sense of authenticity" for helping readers better relate to the young Jake Cole. This realism has also been positively remarked on by other critics. A review by Booklist posited that the novel's autobiographical elements help reinforce this authenticity. Gill's review describes the dichotomy between Rocco and Primiano's descriptions of life on land and life at sea, noting the improved narrative style in the latter.

A few reviews have criticized other aspects of the novel as well. Its sometimes "harried" pace and generally "light character development", for example, was mentioned by reviews by the School Library Journal, among others. This lack of character development, especially regarding Jake's father, was also mentioned by Gill's New York Times review.
