= The Throne of Fire =

2011 novel by Rick Riordan

- Cover of first edition
- Author: Rick Riordan
- Illustrator: John Rocco
- Series: The Kane Chronicles
- Release number: 2
- Genre: Fantasy, adventure, children's novel
- Publisher: Disney Hyperion
- Publication date: May 9, 2011
- Publication place: United States
- Media type: Print, audiobook
- Pages: 452 (first ed.)
- ISBN: 978-1-4231-4056-6
- OCLC: 698117335
- LC Class: PZ7.R4829 Th 2011b
- Preceded by: The Red Pyramid
- Followed by: The Serpent's Shadow

The Throne of Fire is a 2011 fantasy adventure novel written by American author Rick Riordan. It is the second novel in The Kane Chronicles series, which tells of the adventures of modern-day fourteen-year-old Carter Kane and his twelve-year-old sister - Sadie Kane, as they discover that they are descended from the ancient Egyptian pharaohs Narmer and Ramesses the Great. It was released on May 3, 2011. The book takes place roughly three months after the first book, The Red Pyramid. It is followed by the third and final book in the series, The Serpent's Shadow, which was released on May 1, 2012.

== Plot ==
Sadie and Carter Kane must find the three scrolls of the Book of Ra, to wake the sun god Ra from his sleep, and stop Apophis, the serpent of chaos, from destroying the world. With two magician trainees, Jaz and Walt, the Kane siblings manage to retrieve the first scroll in the Brooklyn Museum, fighting off monsters. That night, Sadie's ba (soul) leaves her body and she sees Desjardins, the Chief Lector of the House of Life, discussing a plot to destroy Brooklyn House with a man named Vladimir Menshikov. Meanwhile, Carter's ba meets with the god Horus, who warns him that the gods might attack him if he tries to wake Ra.

On Sadie's birthday, she is attacked in London by the baboon god Babi and the vulture goddess Nekhbet, who are possessing her grandparents. Bes, the dwarf god, rescues her and accompanies Sadie and Carter to the Hermitage Museum in St. Petersburg where they find the second scroll. Menshikov, who has captured the god Set, wounds Carter with a snake. Sadie releases Set from the vase, and Set defeats Menshikov and tells Sadie the location of the third scroll and the name of Zia's home village. Sadie gives back Set his secret name and heals Carter.

Carter and Sadie separate: Walt helps Sadie obtain the third scroll in the Valley of Golden Mummies after fighting off angry Roman mummies while Carter and Bes find Zia in an induced sleep. Carter wakes her, and Zia, having no memories of the adventures her shabti (animated clay or wax figures that can appear to be real humans or animals) had with Carter, attacks him, believing him to be a traitor. Desjardins and Menshikov arrive, and they capture Bes and Carter but Sadie and Walt rescue them. Bes banishes Menshikov and Desjardins back to the Hall of Ages while Menshikov begins assembling forces to destroy Brooklyn House. Sadie persuades Zia to join forces with them, and Zia and Walt leave to defend Brooklyn House. Carter and Sadie climb into Ra's boat and travel into the Duat to retrace Ra's journey.

Carter and Sadie meet aspects of Ra's soul and undergoes obstacles as they find Ra and wake him. However, he is old, feeble, and constantly speaks gibberish. The Kanes and Bes continue down the river and play a game of senet with the moon god Khonsu, earning three more hours of time at the cost of Bes's ren. The Kanes resume their journey deep into the Duat to the pit where Apophis is imprisoned. Menshikov challenges them to a duel and Sadie reads the third scroll to wake the third part of Ra's soul. Apophis possesses Menshikov and prepares to destroy the Kanes, but Desjardins appears and execrates Apophis even deeper into the Duat, but kills himself in the process.

As dawn approaches, the Kanes travel back to defend Brooklyn House, which is under attack by demons, evil magicians, monsters and flying snakes. Bast escorts a still incoherent Ra to his place in the sky. After the battle, the Kanes give the enemy magicians the option to join them and some accept. Because Apophis' defeat is only temporary, Sadie and Carter work to unite all magicians and the gods pledge to fight beside them in the coming war against the forces of Chaos.

== Characters ==
- Carter Kane: a fourteen-year-old magician and previously a host of Horus, the god of war. Since he was eight, after his mother died, he traveled with his father, Julius Kane. He is in love with Zia, a young house magician. He feels deep responsibility for his sister and the rest of the young magicians living at Brooklyn House. He has a love for Egyptian history and can name most artifacts. He is a very skilled combat magician.
- Sadie Kane: a thirteen-year-old magician and previously a host of Isis. She loves gum and has lived with her grandparents since the age of six. She has a stubborn and strong-minded personality, but is also caring and kind. She had a cat named Muffin later revealed to be Bast, the Egyptian goddess of cats, who protected Sadie in her cat form until Sadie found out about the Egyptian gods. She also has a double crush on Anubis and Walt. Although having an English accent in the first book, after living in the States for a few months, starts to use an American accent.
- Amos Kane: Sadie and Carter's uncle, who is a very powerful magician and a jazz musician. He used to be the unwilling host of Set. However, this still affects him as his magic leaves a red mark instead of blue, which was also Carter and Sadie's dad's magic color.
- Walt Stone: one of Sadie and Carter's initiates at the Brooklyn House, which is a part of the House of Life that urges magicians to return to the path of the gods to battle Apophis. Walt is a descendant of the pharaoh Akhenaten, who exiled all the gods except the god Aten. Therefore, Akhenaten's descendants have been cursed and the more they practice magic, the faster it progresses. The curse causes its victims to die at a very young age. Walt suffers from this curse, and will die soon, unless he receives the cure Vladimir may hold. Sadie refers to his appearance as "hottie hottie".
- Jaz: also known as Jasmine, a cheerleader from Nashville, Tennessee, one of Sadie and Carter's initiates at the Brooklyn House. In the beginning, Sadie believes that she loves Walt, which makes her sad, as she loves Walt, but in the end, it turns out Jaz indeed does not have feelings for Walt, and simply wants to help him confess his feelings to Sadie.
- Bast : the Egyptian goddess of cats.
- Vladamir Menshikov: grandson of the great General of the Russian Empire, Alexander Menshikov 18th. His nome is Russia. He has been (willingly) enslaved by Apophis. He tries to become the host of the Apophis to release him and let chaos rule forever. Sadie and Carter go on a quest to stop him.
- Zia Rashid, an absolutely stunning 14-year-old girl, is the main love interest for Carter Kane.She has lots of confidence, and is a mentor to Carter.
- Bes, an absolute cutie patootie and baddie, is the main mentor in this story. He is known to be the most attractive Egyptian god, and scares people away with his intimidation and his glorious face.

== Adaptation ==
A graphic novel adaptation was released on October 6, 2015.

== Sequel ==
Rick Riordan announced that there will be a sequel coming out on May 3, 2011. The title, The Serpent's Shadow, was announced in a blog post by Riordan on January 13, 2011. The book was released worldwide on May 3, 2011. A preview was published in USA Today.

== Critical reception ==
Kirkus Reviews reviewed the episode positively, writing, "This volume begins so thunderously that the narrators seem more like frenetic tour guides than friendly companions, pulling readers along at a breakneck pace. Riordan supplies them with his trademark wisecracking voice and explores themes of power, responsibility, family, love and loyalty as the tale hurtles along."
