= Blackout (picture book) =

Book by John Rocco

- Cover of Blackout
- Author: John Rocco
- Illustrator: Rocco
- Genre: Children's picture book
- Published: May 24, 2011
- Publisher: Disney Hyperion
- Publication place: United States
- Pages: 40 pp
- ISBN: 978-1423121909
- LC Class: PZ7.R5818 Bl 2011
- Followed by: Blizzard

Blackout is a children's picture book written and illustrated by John Rocco, published by Disney Hyperion in 2011. It features a New York City family during an electrical power outage. During the blackout, the lack of distraction by their technological devices leads to a renewal of the family members' connections with each other.

Blackout was a 2012 Caldecott Honor Book, one runner-up for the annual Caldecott Medal. Fox 2000 has optioned it for a live-action feature. In 2013, the book was made into an animated film narrated by Stanley Tucci.
