= Magnus Chase and the Gods of Asgard =

Novel series by Rick Riordan

- Logo of the series
- The Sword of Summer (2015); The Hammer of Thor (2016); The Ship of the Dead (2017)
- Author: Rick Riordan
- Cover artist: John Rocco
- Country: United States
- Language: English
- Genre: Fantasy, children's literature, comedy drama, thriller, Norse mythology
- Publisher: Disney Hyperion (US); Penguin Books/Puffin (UK, AU, NZ)
- Published: 2015–2017
- Media type: Print (hardback and paperback), e-book, audiobook
- No. of books: 3

Magnus Chase and the Gods of Asgard is a trilogy of fantasy novels based on Norse mythology written by American author Rick Riordan and published by Disney-Hyperion. It is set in the same universe as the Camp Half-Blood Chronicles and The Kane Chronicles series. The first book, The Sword of Summer, was released on October 6, 2015. The second book, The Hammer of Thor, was released on October 4, 2016. The Ship of the Dead, the third book, was released on October 3, 2017.

The main protagonist, Magnus Chase, son of the Vanir god of fertility Frey, narrates the novel in first person. He is a cousin of Annabeth Chase, a main character of the Percy Jackson and the Olympians and The Heroes of Olympus series, who links the two series together.

== Books ==
=== The Sword of Summer ===
The Sword of Summer is the first book in the series, released on October 6, 2015, as a hardcover, e-book, and audiobook. The novel is narrated by Magnus Chase, a homeless Bostonian orphan, who learns he is the son of a Norse god at first knowing from his uncle. On the same day, he is confronted by a fire giant named Surt, who wishes to claim a sword called "Sumarbrander" (the "Sword of Summer", or "Jack"). In the fight, Magnus is killed and carried to an ancient interpretation of the Norse afterlife, named Valhalla, by a Valkyrie named Samirah "Sam" al-Abbas. With the help of Sam, a dwarf named Blitz, and an elf named Hearth, Magnus ruins the giant's plans to free the Fenris Wolf and hasten Ragnarök.

The novel has been well-received since its publication, but was not a "big front-runner" among other bestselling books in 2015. It debuted at #1 on the New York Times Children's Middle Grade Hardcover Best Sellers list, and rose to #3 on Amazon's best-selling Children's Books list for 2015. It also won the Goodreads Choice Award for Middle Grade & Children's books in 2015. The Sword of Summer has been especially praised as an excellent continuation of author Rick Riordan's writing style, although some critics have expressed regret that the book only meets the expectations of fans, rather than surpassing them.

The Sword of Summer was later published in several foreign-language editions, as well as a UK edition with the same title (published by Puffin Books). Its foreign-language editions include ones in Spanish, Portuguese, Italian, Turkish, Dutch, German, Bulgarian, Finnish, Polish, French, Norwegian, Chinese, Czech, Russian, Romanian, Indonesian and Hebrew. While the U.S. editions have cover art by illustrator John Rocco, most foreign editions have unique art created by other artists and illustrators. In the U.S., several unique promotional editions were released by different booksellers during the initial publication; the mass-merchandiser Target, for example, released its books with an included poster of the Nine Worlds of Norse mythology.

=== The Hammer of Thor ===
The Hammer of Thor is the second book in the Magnus Chase and the Gods of Asgard series and was released on October 4, 2016. In this book, Magnus receives a quest from Otis, Thor's goat and discovers that the hammer of Thor, Mjölnir, is missing. He embarks on a quest with Samirah, Hearthstone, Blitzen, and Alex Fierro, a genderfluid child of Loki to retrieve it. However, the giant Utgard-Loki reveals that the Giant Thrym has the hammer, and tells the group to retrieve the Skofnung Sword. The god Loki arranges a marriage between Samirah and the Giant so as to free himself with the sword. At the wedding, Alex takes Samirah's place and tries to stop Magnus's Uncle Randolph from freeing Loki. However, she fails to do so, and Loki is freed. The group is honored for retrieving Thor's hammer but dissatisfied for not stopping Loki, and are given another mission to catch Loki and stop him from bringing about Ragnarök.

The novel was awarded the 2017 Stonewall Book Award for children's literature.

=== The Ship of the Dead ===
The Ship of the Dead is the third book in the Magnus Chase and the Gods of Asgard series and was released on October 3, 2017. Magnus and his crew must sail to the farthest borders of Jotunheim and Niflheim in pursuit of Asgard's greatest threat and prevent Loki from starting Ragnarok by beating him in a flyting with Kvasir's Mead and capturing him in a magical nutshell, thus stopping Naglfar from sailing. They are greeted by the gods when they arrive in Vigridr, after sailing the currents that Naglfar, the ship of the dead, would have sailed. Magnus and Alex take Randolf's old mansion and make it "The Chase Space", a home for homeless children.

== Supplementary works ==
=== Hotel Valhalla: Guide to the Norse Worlds ===
Hotel Valhalla: Guide to the Norse Worlds is a supplementary work for the Magnus Chase and the Gods of Asgard series, consisting of background information on the gods, monsters, dwarves, and elves that are featured in the main series. It was published as a hardcover on August 16, 2016.

The introduction is written by Helgi, the hotel manager. He welcomes new residents and thanks them for their sacrifice. He then explains that the book is meant to answer any questions they may have about the experiences of their new existence, and asks that they consult the book before bothering him.

The next section, titled "What in the Worlds?" is written by Hunding the bellhop. He doesn't really want to write anything for the book, but his boss Helgi is making him do it. He explains the universe from the Norse perspective: nine worlds held in the branches of Yggdrasil the World Tree. The first of these worlds, Asgard, is home to the Aesir, and the location of Hotel Valhalla, where Odin's einherjar live. Vanaheim is the home of the Vanir, and the ream of Folkvanger, the peaceful Norse afterlife. Midgard is the Norse name for Earth, home of the humans, and is connected to Asgard by the Bifrost. Alfheim, ruled by Frey, is inhabited by light elves. There is no night in this world. Jotunheim is inhabited by the jotun, or giants. It is covered in mountains, snow, and ice. Nidavellir is home to the dwarves, and is very gloomy, chilly, and dark because it is entirely underground. Muspellheim houses the fire giants and demons, and resembles the sun. Niflheim is inhabited by the frost giants, and is cold and foggy. Finally, Helheim is the realm of Hel and the dishonorable dead. Hunding also describes the Ginnungagap, the void between the worlds, and the Norse creation story.

Hunding's description of the nine worlds is followed by sections describing some of the Norse gods and creatures, most accompanied by a supplementary short story, interview, poem, or note. The list of gods includes Odin, Thor, Loki, Frey, Freya, Skirnir, Mimir, Hel, Heimdal, Ran, Frigg, Balder, Hod, Idun, Honir, Tyr, Uller, and Njord. Hunding lists the homeworld of each one, as well as their physical description, family members, and what they are best known for. A few of the better-known gods also get a few extra facts thrown in. Snorri Sturluson manages to get interviews with a few of the gods, while others get short stories. Frey gets to have a rap battle with Jack the sword, and Frigg answers questions in a weekly advice column.

The list of mythical beings includes Surt, Ymir, Utgard-Loki, Gerd, Elves, dwarves, Valkyries, and the Norns. Each entry includes the being's classification, homeworld, appearance, and what they are best known for. The extra material includes a threat from Surt, a poem by Gerd, a message from the Alfheim news team, diary entries, and a few short stories.

Next, Hunding (who's really getting tired of having to write the book at this point) lists the fantastic creatures of the Norse world. He addresses Nidhogg, the eagle of Yggdrasil, Ratatosk, Heidrun, Eikthrymir, Saehrimnir, Sleipnir, Jormungand, Fenris wolf, and Thor's goats, Otis and Marvin, explaining what they are, where they live, and why they are noteworthy. Ratatosk manages to fit in some insults, Sleipnir tells the story of how Loki gave birth to him, and Marvin includes some tasty recipes for goat meat, while Njord provides some lullabies written by Frey that are useful in keeping Jormungand asleep.

Helgi closes the book, urging the readers to consider all the possibilities that their afterlife affords them. He again strongly discourages them from asking him any questions. A pronunciation guide and glossary are also included.

Currently last book for now as series wasn't continued there is news that it will, so this book was last installment other than "9 From the Nine Worlds".

=== 9 From the Nine Worlds ===
"9 From the Nine Worlds" is the second supplementary work for the series, consisting of nine short stories, each told by a different character, and each taking place in a different Norse realm. It was published on October 2, 2018.

The first story, "Just Another Decapitated [sic] Head," is set in Asgard and is told from Odin's perspective as he wanders the hallways of Hotel Valhalla, observing the inhabitants, keeping the peace, and trying to decide on a new captain to lead his Valkyries after the death of the previous one. In the middle also getting annoyed by his son, Thor who had decided to take a jog through the nine worlds and was now in the garden of Valhalla.

The second story, "This Is Why I Hate Clothes Shopping," takes place in Midgard and is told by Amir Fadlan, son of the owner of Fadlans falafel. When a simple shopping trip to purchase new clothes for a wedding anniversary party goes wrong, Amir's friends are forced to rescue him from a shopkeeper intent on trapping him in a magical pair of pants.

Nidavellir provides the setting for the third story, "This Little Light of Mine, I'm Going to Let It Shine," narrated by Blitzen. When Thor is threatened by an assassination attempt, the god Mimir calls on Blitzen to save his life. Blitzen succeeds in stopping Alviss, the guilty dwarf, but when a group of other dwarves mistake his actions for unprovoked assault, he is forced to run. He only escapes by falling off of a cliff and into a river.

Hearthstone the elf tells the fourth story, "Speaking of Trolls..." which is set in Alfheim. While talking to T. J., Hearthstone's bracelet begins to shine, indicating that his friend Inge is in danger. When he travels to Alfheim to help her, he finds that she is with another family and has to save her by defeating a troll.

The fifth story, "My Eighth-Grade Physics Actually Comes in Handy," takes place in Jotunheim, and is written from the perspective of Samirah al-Abbas. Odin, attempting to keep Ragnarok from being triggered, sends her to Jotunheim to inspect an egg. If this egg were to hatch, Ragnarok would start. Samirah manages to use Thor to distract Eggther who guards the egg, giving her enough time to determine that the egg was not hatching, and to take a picture of it for Odin.

The sixth story, "Nice Doggy," takes place in Helheim and is told by Thomas "T. J." Jefferson Jr. T.J.'s consciousness ends up traveling to Helheim in the form of a vision, where he encounters Hel, the realm's ruler. She charges him with the task of finding her hound Garm, telling him that if he succeeds, he may save the soul of his dead mother. Fortunately, with the help of Balder, he is able to find and subdue Garm.

Mallory Keen tells the seventh story, "So's Your Face!" which is set in Niflheim. When Mallory finds herself trapped in Niflheim, she discovers that the only way out is through Yggdrasil's root, which Nidhogg chews on. By teaching the dragon some insults, she is able to gain a lift through the tree and climb back to Hotel Valhalla.

The eighth story, "Well, That Was a Surprise," is told by Halfborn Gunderson and takes place in Vanaheim. Halfborn is making a gift for Mallory, but he needs dragon scales to finish it. To procure them, he travels to Vanaheim, where he finds three peaceful dragons. He kills them, reassuring the realm's concerned inhabitants that they will respawn, before returning with the scales.

Alex Fierro tells the final story, "I Play with Fire," which takes place in Muspellheim. Hearing word that Surt is attempting to recruit people to join his movement against the gods of Asgard, Alex travels to Muspellheim to stop him. They are able to keep the defectors from joining him by whispering suspicions about Surt by turning into insects, and is finally joined by the rest of the gang to defeat Surt.

All nine stories are connected together by Thor, who decided to take a jog with his fitness tracker through the nine worlds. Each perspective character encounters him in one way or another way, sometimes saving him, while other times cleaning up his messes. The book ends with him lamenting the fact that he forgot to turn on his fitness tracker at the start before starting his run.

== Characters ==
- Magnus Chase – The protagonist of the series, a 16-year-old demigod son of the god Frey as well as the cousin of Greek demigod Annabeth Chase. After his mother was killed by wolves when he was 14, Magnus ended up living on the streets of Boston until his death and induction into Valhalla by Samirah, which made him an einherjar. He wields Sumarbrander, also known as "Jack", a sentient sword previously owned by his father Frey.
- Samirah "Sam" al-Abbas – A Muslim American Valkyrie and demigod daughter of the god Loki. She is engaged to Amir Fadlan and dreams of becoming a pilot one day.
- Blitzen (Blitz) – A svartalf, son of Freya, an expert and connoisseur on clothing and crafting.
- Hearthstone (Hearth) – A deaf light elf from Alfheim, who is experienced in rune casting. He uses ASL and has two sets of runestones; wooden and stone.
- Alex Fierro – A genderfluid (Note: Alex Fierro uses both he/him and she/her pronouns.) demigod child of Loki who wields a garrote capable of slicing even the most hardened rock, as well as having the ability to sculpt and bring to life her own creations. Alex alternates between She/Her and He/Him pronouns, though states that generally She/Her is preferred. Alex had a rough childhood and relationship with her mortal family that ended with her living on the streets for roughly the same amount of time as Magnus. Alex is first introduced in the second book, The Hammer of Thor. Alex begins dating Magnus Chase at the end of the third book, “The Ship of the Dead”.
- Randolph Chase – Magnus' uncle, who is obsessed with Norse mythology. He betrays Magnus Chase to Loki because Loki promised to bring his family back. At the end of Hammer of Thor Loki kills him.
- Loki – The main antagonist and the Norse god of mischief, lies, and deceit. He is the father of demigod Samirah Al-Abbas and mother of demigod Alex Fierro.
- Sif – a Norse goddess with magic hair which is mentioned to be the inspiration for the Rapunzel fairy tale.
- Annabeth Chase – Magnus Chase's cousin. Also in the Percy Jackson and the Olympians and The Heroes of Olympus series. Demigod daughter of the Greek goddess Athena. She is Percy Jackson's girlfriend.
- Mallory Keen – An Irish resident at Hotel Valhalla since her death in 1972. She is the daughter of Frigg. She is a very intimidating and skilled fighter and has dual serrated knives, a gift from her mother, Frigg. She is also the on again-off again girlfriend of Halfborn Gunderson.
- Halfborn Gunderson – A resident at Hotel Valhalla. He was a Viking until he died and has been at Valhalla for 1,200 years. A Berserker, he has two axes and is very violent.
- Thomas Jefferson, Jr "T.J." – A resident at Hotel Valhalla. He is the son of Tyr. His mother was a runaway slave. He was a Union soldier in the American Civil War. He has a rifle and bone steel bayonet, given to him by his father; Tyr. T.J. died charging the battlements at Fort Wagner, South Carolina. Due to his parentage, he has a compulsion to accept every battle he is challenged too.
- "X" / Odin – Odin is the king of gods. He pretended to be a half-troll named "X", but in reality, he was trying to watch Hotel Valhalla.
- Percy Jackson – He is the main protagonist in Percy Jackson and the Olympians series and one of the main characters in The Heroes of Olympus. He is the son of the sea god Poseidon. In this series, he appears briefly to teach Magnus ocean survival skills to take down Loki and survive the Sea Gods. He is Annabeth Chase's boyfriend.
- Thor – The god of thunder, son of Odin, and protector of the human realm. He wields the hammer Mjölnir.
- Freya – The goddess of love, twin sister of Frey, and ruler of Fólkvangr.

== Reception ==
Publishers Weekly's review of The Sword of Summer stated that, "ten years after The Lightning Thief... Magnus Chase and the Gods of Asgard's sensibility is right in line with the Percy Jackson novels, and the audience will be just as large."
