= Alex Fierro =

Fictional character in Magnus Chase and the Gods of Asgard

- Magnus Chase and the Gods of Asgard character
- First appearance: The Hammer of Thor
- Last appearance: 9 From the Nine Worlds
- Created by: Rick Riordan
- Occupation: Demigod hero, Einherjar
- Godly parent: Loki

In-universe information
- Species: Demigod

Alex Fierro is a fictional character and one of the main characters in Rick Riordan's Magnus Chase and the Gods of Asgard series. Alex's portrayal in The Hammer of Thor (book 2 of said series) was praised for its honest and accurate approach to the character's genderfluid identity. As a child of Loki, Alex is a demigod and also capable of shapeshifting; in The Hammer of Thor, Alex becomes an einheri.

== Creation and conception ==
In an answer to a question on Goodreads' Ask the Author, Riordan has stated that Alex Fierro is loosely based on the transgender students he had once taught. Riordan had used the book of interviews Beyond Magenta as a source of information for developing the character.

== Description ==
Alex Fierro is a child of Loki with heterochromia. Alex is genderfluid, switching between male and female. She tells Magnus that she prefers others use the pronoun that matches her current gender identity, rather than simply using the singular they. She also says she usually identifies as a girl and prefers she/her unless she says otherwise. Though Alex's parent is Loki, then in the guise of a woman and known for being fluid between genders and shapeshifting, Alex does not accept the queer traits she inherited as Loki’s or attribute her gender-fluidity to her parentage. Magnus is initially shocked by her identity, but quickly grows to accept it. Because Alex is gender fluid, the thanes of Valhalla and some fellow einherjar call Alex argr, Old Norse for "unmanly". Being a child of Loki, Alex is distrusted at first, but is later accepted by Magnus and his/her floormates. Alex Fierro is also capable of shapeshifting, another trait she inherited from Loki. She is of Mexican ancestry from her mortal father, and paternally comes from a long line of ceramists; Alex herself is gifted at pottery.

After dying, Alex is selected as an einherji by her sister Samirah and the latter oversees the former's first appearance as a cheetah running across Valhalla with Magnus and his floormates chasing Alex. Fierro had attacked the hotel manager and wrecked her given room.

== Reception ==
Alex Fierro was praised by reviewers as a new attempt to secure LGBTQ rights. Texas A&M University-Commerce noted that the introduction of Fierro complicated matters. They noted that Riordan spent more time with Fierro's prose, but that it deepened his/her characterization. They also noted that Fierro made a point about not representing the entire gender fluid population in the book. Hypable said that the introduction of a genderfluid character is a "risk" as a portion of the population will not want their children to be exposed to the "realities of life". However, they do note that Riordan's "firm grasp" over his audience will make things acceptable. They further note that readers being exposed to people different from themselves is a good thing and state that Alex is a "step in the right direction," who is also a warrior and potential love interest of Magnus Chase, the lead character of the novel. Later on in the third entry of the series, she actually does kiss Magnus, and in the final pages, they kiss a final time.

Laughing Place states that Riordan has taken on LGBTQ issues, using his books as a way of educating readers to be accepting of people, no matter their identity. The narrator Magnus explains that Alex Fierro's identity does not bother him outwardly and internally. Kirkus Reviews stated that through the addition of Alex Fierro, a gender-fluid half-sibling of Muslim Valkyrie Samirah Al Abbas, Riordan effectively interposed racial and sexual complexity into the "all-white" Norse mythological world. Common Sense Media states that Alex is one of Riordan's diverse characters, and his/her struggles add more depth to the story. Booklist notes that Alex deals with the social issue of gender-fluidity, as she is gender fluid.

=== Accolades ===
The Hammer of Thor won the Stonewall Book Award for Children's Literature in 2017, for its portrayal of the genderfluid character Alex Fierro. The American Library Association said that Fierro was a hero who represented the "expansive possibilities" of gender for future generations.

== Influence ==
In early January 2017, Texas Republican lawmakers introduced a bathroom bill based on that of North Carolina. The Texas Legislature invited Riordan for the authors' event to honor him. Riordan declined the offer and told them to "stop this nonsense" if they wanted to honor him. The Washington Post expressed the view that fans of Riordan and Fierro will make the next generation of American leaders more tolerant.
