= The Serpent's Shadow (Riordan novel) =

2012 novel by Rick Riordan

- Cover of first edition
- Author: Rick Riordan
- Illustrator: John Rocco
- Series: The Kane Chronicles
- Release number: 3
- Genre: Fantasy, adventure, children's novel
- Publisher: Disney Hyperion
- Publication date: May 1, 2012
- Publication place: United States
- Media type: Print, audiobook
- Pages: 406 (first ed.)
- ISBN: 978-1423140573
- OCLC: 757484331
- LC Class: PZ7.R4829 Se 2012
- Preceded by: The Throne of Fire

The Serpent's Shadow is a 2012 fantasy adventure novel based on Egyptian mythology written by American author Rick Riordan. It is the third and final novel in The Kane Chronicles series. It was published by Disney Hyperion on May 1, 2012.

== Plot ==
This book begins six months after the events of the preceding novel, when Carter Kane and Sadie Kane meet J.D. Grissom, the leader of the 51st Nome. They need a magic scroll from the Dallas Museum of Art, or in three days, Apophis will rise and destroy the world, but the scroll is destroyed after an attack on the Nome. Sadie is told to retrieve a shadow box of King Tut. Carter decides to consults Thoth, suspecting a better way to execrate Apophis while Sadie meets with Anubis who suggests that the shadow box is like a backup. Sadie uses Bes' sheut to restore the god's sou and then meets Amos who tells them that the rebels have teamed up with Apophis while Carter and Walt realize they have to visit the Land of the Dead and persuade Osiris to help them.

When Zia and Sadie are visiting the House of Rest, Sadie realizes that Amos is learning the Path of Set, who he was once forced to host. After learning the location of Bes's sheut, the groups meet and exchange information. Carter and Zia help Setne obtain the Book of Thoth and learns that Ra, or Khepri has chosen Zia as a host. However, Setne tricks them by bringing them to the Land of Demons. Meanwhile, the goddess Neith helps Sadie and Walt who uses the rest of his energy to revive Bes' sheut, before being revived as the host of Anubis. Neith agrees to help fight Apophis and Sadie goes through a portal, leaving Walt. At the Sea of Chaos, Carter and Zia summon and trap the serpent's shadow with Setne's help before Setne betrays them. Sadie drops out of a portal above them and saves them but Setne gets away. With Tawaret and gods from the Fourth House, they fight off the shadow's reinforcements and get on Ra's sun barge.

They arrive in Giza to find Bast distracting Apophis as best as she can. Bes and Ra/Zia go to help her, while Sadie and Carter goes to help defend the First Nome. Sadie and Carter fight with the help of Amos, channeling Set, and they succeed and restore the Nome. In order to perform the execration, Carter/Horus and the gods all fight different parts of Apophis. Sadie and Carter manage to cast the execration spell and destroy Apophis but the gods have to withdraw.

Ra offers Horus the throne, and Carter takes the throne of the Pharaoh in the First Nome. Carter leaves Amos as the Chief Lector and chooses to focus on running Brooklyn House. Walt has gone missing, and Bast and Bes have also withdrawn. They return to Brooklyn House and Walt/Anubis shares a dance with Sadie while Carter starts a relationship with Zia. Setne is still on the loose with the Book of Thoth and Brooklyn House has had an influx of initiates, as have most of the Nomes in the world. Carter and Sadie explain that there won't be more recordings. There is also a suspicion about Long Island's unexplainable magic, leading on to Demigods and Magicians: The Son of Sobek. The book ends with an invitation to anyone with pharaoh's blood to join the House of Life.

== Characters ==
- Carter Kane: The host of Horus and has the "blood of the Pharaohs," being a descendant of Narmer and Ramses the Great through both sides of his family. He is one of the main protagonists, and is initially described as always dressing "impeccably" in dress shirts and pants due to the influence of his father, Julius, but relaxes into a more modern style as the series progresses. He has dark skin, curly dark brown hair and brown eyes, more closely resembling his African-American father than his white mother. After the death of his mother, he spent six years travelling with his father. His speciality is combat magic and his preferred weapon is a khopesh, an ancient Egyptian sword. His girlfriend is Zia Rashid.
- Sadie Kane: A host of Isis. She is described to have blue eyes and caramel hair, neither brunette nor blonde. As she stays in England and more closely resembles her white mother than her African-American father, her skin is paler than Carter's and has a slight British accent. Her father gave her a cat whom she named Muffin, although it is actually the goddess Bast who is the protector of the Kane siblings. Sadie is the bold one from the Kane siblings. Sadie's boyfriend is Walt/Anubis.
- Walt Stone: A young, dying Egyptian magician who bears the curse of Akhenhaten. He becomes the host of Anubis in order to stay alive. Walt is also Sadie Kane's boyfriend. His speciality is in charm making.
- Amos Kane: A powerful Egyptian magician who became a partial host of Set. He is Julius Kane's brother, and a former protector of the Kane children. At the beginning of the series, he is the third most powerful member of the House of Life, after Iskandar and Michel Desjardins, but after the deaths of Iskandar and Desjardins, he becomes the most powerful magician in the world, and Chief Lector of the House of Life.
- Zia Rashid: A fourteen-year-old Egyptian magician. She is a friend to Sadie and Carter's girlfriend. She is also a host of the Egyptian god Ra.
- Bast: The Egyptian goddess of cats. She becomes the Kane children's protector after Ruby dies freeing her from her prison.
- Set: The powerful Egyptian god of deserts, storms, disorder, violence and foreigners.
- Apophis: The embodiment of Chaos and ancient enemy of Ra. He used the demon Face of Horror as his host.
- Julius Kane: An Egyptian magician who becomes the host of Osiris and releases the gods from their prisons. He is Carter and Sadie Kane's father. His wife, Ruby Kane, died trying to free Bast and seal away the chaos snake Apophis in Cleopatra's Needle. He is also an Egyptologist. Has mixed emotions about Walt Stone and Anubis the god of death.
- Ruby Kane: Carter and Sadie's mom who dies at Cleopatra's Needle trying to seal away the chaos snake Apophis.
- Ra: The midday sun god. He was once the king of the Gods, but abdicates his throne in favor of Horus.
