= The Red Pyramid =

2010 novel by Rick Riordan

- Cover of first edition
- Author: Rick Riordan
- Illustrator: Sean O'Kelly; Michelle Gengaro-Kokmen (Hieroglyph art)
- Cover artist: John Rocco
- Series: The Kane Chronicles
- Release number: 1
- Genre: Fantasy, Egyptian mythology, young-adult fiction
- Publisher: Disney Hyperion
- Publication date: May 4, 2010
- Publication place: United States
- Media type: Print, audiobook
- Pages: 516 (first ed.)
- ISBN: 978-1-4231-1338-6
- OCLC: 488861751
- LC Class: PZ7.R4829 Re 2010
- Followed by: The Throne of Fire

The Red Pyramid is a 2010 fantasy-adventure novel based on Egyptian mythology written by Rick Riordan. It is the first novel in The Kane Chronicles series. The novel was first published in the United States on May 4, 2010, by Hyperion Books for Children, an imprint of Disney Publishing Worldwide. It has been published in hardcover, audiobook, ebook, and large-print editions, and has been translated into 19 languages from its original English.

The book follows the Kane siblings, Carter and Sadie, as they discover they are descended from both the pharaohs and magicians of ancient Egypt. As a result, they are able to both host gods and wield magic. The duo unknowingly hosts the Egyptian gods Horus and Isis, while their father is taken as a host by Osiris who is captured by Set. They are thrown into an adventure to rescue their father, while simultaneously trying to save the world from destruction. The novel is written as though it is a transcription of an audio recording by siblings Carter and Sadie Kane, alternately narrated in first-person by the siblings.

The Red Pyramid received generally positive reviews with critics praising its pace, action and storyline. The novel was on the Amazon Children's bestseller list. It also won a School Library Journal Best Book Award, and was also shortlisted for the 2011 Red House Children's Book Award. The audiobook of The Red Pyramid, narrated by Katherine Kellgren and Kevin R. Free, was a finalist at the Audiobook of the Year Award.

== Plot ==
Carter and his father Julius Kane are visiting Carter's sister Sadie, who has lived with her maternal grandparents in London since the death of their mother, Ruby Kane. Julius, a magician posing as a simple Egyptologist, takes the siblings to the British Museum, where he tries to bring Osiris (the Egyptian god of the Underworld) into the mortal world. His magic has the unintended side effect of summoning the gods Horus, Isis, Nephthys, and Set, as well as alerting the magicians Zia Rashid and Michel Desjardins to his actions, which are illegal in the magic community. Set, a god of chaos, captures Julius and declares his intention to become king of the world. Unbeknownst to Carter and Sadie, each of the released gods chooses a mortal host from the humans in the room.

Carter and Sadie are taken to Brooklyn by their uncle Amos, who tells them they are descended from a long line of magicians, beginning with the Egyptian pharaohs Ramesses the Great and Narmer. He also explains the grave danger Set poses to the world and goes to find him. While he is away, the mansion is attacked by Set's minions. With help from Sadie's cat Muffin, who is host to the goddess Bast, and Zia Rashid, they escape to Cairo. Once there, Carter and Sadie discover they are hosts to the gods Horus and Isis, respectively. They train in magic until the magicians' leader Iskandar dies and Michel Desjardins orders their deaths for collaborating illegally with the gods. The siblings escape and form a plan to defeat Set — hoping to rescue their father and clear their names within the magic community. They travel to Set's lair in Arizona, gathering ingredients for a magic spell and evading hostile monsters and magicians.

Bast sacrifices herself while defending Carter and Sadie from Sobek, then they encounter Amos and then Zia. The foursome heads to Set's hideout, where they learn the final piece of the spell they need from a dying Zia, the unknowing host of Nephthys. Carter, Sadie, Horus, and Isis use the spell to subdue Set, although they stop short of completely destroying him because they realize his actions were dictated by a far worse enemy — Apophis, a much more powerful god of chaos. Desjardins reluctantly allows Carter and Sadie to go free after they part with Horus and Isis. After a tearful goodbye with Zia, who turns out to have been a magical copy of the real magician, Carter and Sadie return to Brooklyn. They visit their father, now in the underworld, reunited with their ghostly mother. As a gift, the other gods as well as Osiris (hosted by the deceased Julius) help Bast return to the mortal world. Carter and Sadie describe their plans to recruit other magicians to (illegally) study the path of the gods, and Carter also resolves to seek out the real Zia Rashid.

== Characters ==
- Carter Kane – the 14-year-old son of Julius and Ruby Kane. After the death of his mother, he spent six years traveling with his father and, as he put it, "living out of a suitcase." He has dark skin, curly dark brown hair, and brown eyes, and is described initially as always dressing "impeccably" in dress shirts and pants, though he relaxes into a more modern style as the series progresses. As a descendant of Narmer and Ramses the Great through both sides of his family, he bears the "blood of the pharaohs," and hosts the war god, Horus. His specialty is combat magic and his preferred weapon is a khopesh, an ancient Egyptian sword.
- Sadie Kane – the 12-year-old daughter of Julius and Ruby Kane, and Carter's sister. She was six when her mother died and afterward lived in England with her "normal" grandparents. She is lighter-skinned than Carter, with blue eyes and "caramel-colored" hair. The bolder, more reckless of the Kane siblings, she teases her brother all the time, though she does care about him. She hosts Isis, the goddess of magic.
- Julius Kane – Sadie and Carter's father, and Egyptologist and, secretly, an Egyptian magician who becomes a host of Osiris. His wife, Ruby Kane, died trying to seal away the chaos snake Apophis in Cleopatra's Needle.
- Amos Kane – Julius Kane's brother, and an Egyptian magician who protects the Kane children.
- Zia Rashid – An Egyptian magician who is a host of Nephthys.
- Bast – The Egyptian goddess of cats, protector of the Kane children under the guise of Sadie's cat Muffin.
- Set – The Egyptian god of evil, and the main antagonist of the novel.
- Horus – The Egyptian god of war, possesses Carter in the story until they part.
- Isis – The Egyptian goddess of magic who was hosted by Sadie until they part.

Minor Characters:

- Thoth, the Egyptian god of knowledge
- Anubis, the Egyptian god of funerals
- Iskandar, former head of the House of Life
- Michel Desjardins, the new head of the House of Life

== Composition and marketing ==
According to Riordan, the idea for The Kane Chronicles series came from his realization that the only ancient history subject more popular than Ancient Greece was that of Ancient Egypt. He had already written and published several books in the Percy Jackson & the Olympians series, which dealt with the interaction between Greek mythology and the modern world. The idea of having two multiracial siblings narrate the book also came from his experience as a teacher. Carter and Sadie Kane, the titular characters, were inspired by two siblings he taught, as well as the fact that Ancient Egypt was a multicultural society.

In an interview with Publishers Weekly at the BEA 2010 Show, where Riordan signed copies of the novel, he said that Ancient Egypt "fascinates kids." He did extensive research so that "The magic, the spells, the shabti, are all grounded in reality." In another interview, Riordan objected to the longstanding Western tradition of separating Egyptian history from the history of other African societies, saying it was important to "firmly [put] Egypt back into the realm of African history." The Red Pyramid was the first time Riordan used alternating points of view because it was "very important ... that both genders have protagonists they can identify with."

== Release ==
The Red Pyramid had a first printing of one million copies. The series was planned to consist of one book per year to build anticipation. The novel featured cover art by John Rocco, with interior illustrations by Michelle Gengaro-Kokmen. As of 2010, the novel had sold 630,000 copies.

The Red Pyramid received a lexile score of 650L making it appropriate for 11–14 year olds. Since its release, the novel has been translated into 19 languages.

On May 4, 2010, a fourteen-hour and 32 minute audiobook version of The Red Pyramid, read by Katherine Kellgren and Kevin R.Free, who later read all the audiobooks in the series, was published worldwide by Brilliance Audio. On October 2, 2012, a graphic novel version of The Red Pyramid, adapted and illustrated by artist Orpheus Collar, was published worldwide by Disney Hyperion. On September 7, 2012, pictures from the graphic novel were released by Rick Riordan on his official website.

== Reception ==
The Washington Post said that Riordan "begins [the book] with a literal bang" and "the pace never flags as the narrative cuts between Carter and Sadie." The book was also listed in The Washington Post's summer book club. The New York Times's Bruce Handy was mildly critical of The Red Pyramid saying it had "eruptions of mayhem every few pages and exposition falling like hail", as well as "a sea of churning narrative". However, Handy said, "Riordan fans young and old will eat this new book up." He also commented that the book was "wholly satisfying while also setting the table for what promises to be a rip-roaring saga with nasty villains" and "engaging love interests." Kirkus Reviews thought the story was similar to Riordan's other works like The Lightning Thief in terms of chapters, characters, and plot, but noted, "that's not all bad." School Library Journal named The Red Pyramid a Best Book of 2010, and it was also shortlisted for the 2011 Red House Children's Book Award. The novel also appeared on the Amazon Children's bestseller list.

AudioFile magazine praised the audiobook, writing that "Riordan’s works transition well to the audiobook format with their formula of equal parts nonstop adventure and well-camouflaged education". He praised the introduction of dual narrators, who "add a welcome level of complexity" and both Kevin Free and Katherine Kellgren. The audiobook of The Red Pyramid was a finalist at the Audiobook of the Year Award.

Publishers Weekly praised the graphic novel, writing that "the plot lends itself fluidly to the graphic novel format", praising Collar's "cinematic artwork" and "tongue-in-cheek details", concluding, "new readers and existing fans alike will dive right in".

== Sequel ==
The sequel to The Red Pyramid is titled The Throne of Fire; it was published on May 3, 2011.

== Netflix Adaptation ==
On September 12, 2020, it was announced that the three books are being adapted for Netflix as feature films.
