= The Kane Chronicles =

Novel series by Rick Riordan

- Logo of the series
- The Red Pyramid (2010); The Throne of Fire (2011); The Serpent's Shadow (2012)
- Author: Rick Riordan
- Cover artist: John Rocco
- Country: United States
- Language: English and Egyptian
- Genre: Egyptian mythological fiction, fantasy, adventure and children's fiction
- Publisher: Disney Hyperion (US); Penguin Books/Puffin (UK, AU, NZ)
- Published: 2010–2012
- Media type: Print (hardcover and paperback), audiobook, e-book
- No. of books: 3

The Kane Chronicles is a trilogy of adventure novels based on Egyptian mythology written by American author Rick Riordan. The series is set in the same universe as Riordan's other franchises, Camp Half-Blood Chronicles and Magnus Chase and the Gods of Asgard.

The novels are narrated alternately in first-person by the two protagonists, siblings Carter and Sadie Kane. The siblings are powerful magicians descended from the two pharaohs Narmer and Ramses the Great. They and their friends are forced to contend with Egyptian gods and goddesses who still interact with the modern world.

== Origins ==
Rick Riordan, a former middle-school social studies teacher, stated that the idea for The Kane Chronicles came from his realization that the only ancient history subject more popular than Ancient Greece was Ancient Egypt. Riordan had already written and published several books in the Percy Jackson & the Olympians series, which dealt with the interaction between Greek mythology and the modern world. The idea of having two multiracial siblings narrate the books also came from his experience as a teacher. Carter and Sadie Kane were inspired by two siblings that he taught, as well as multicultural society.

== Novel series ==
Sections entitled "Author's Notes" at the beginning and end of books in the series explain to readers that the story is a transcript of audiotapes Rick Riordan received from Carter and Sadie Kane. The story takes place in the same universe as the Camp Half-Blood Chronicles and the Magnus Chase and the Gods of Asgard and several references are made to the other books. In the three main novels, only two characters — Drew Tanaka and Lacy, who are both children of Aphrodite from Camp Half-Blood — cross over between novel series.

=== The Red Pyramid ===
The first book in the series, The Red Pyramid, was released on May 4, 2010. The story is told as a transcription of a recording made by Sadie and Carter Kane, detailing the rise of the Egyptian gods in the modern world.

After a mysterious accident in a museum leaves their Egyptologist father missing, siblings Carter and Sadie Kane are taken in by their uncle Amos and introduced to their family's long and proud tradition of magic. The duo discovers that they have been chosen as "hosts" by the gods Horus and Isis, respectively, and are hunted by the House of Life, the world's governing body of Egyptian magicians, because they have forbidden magicians to follow the path of the gods (which Carter and Sadie are currently doing). Carter and Sadie learn that the god Set plans to destroy the North American continent using their father's power, and they embark on a quest to save him and prove their innocence and good intentions to the House. While on their quest, they learn that a greater threat is rising: Apophis.

=== The Throne of Fire ===
The second book in the series, The Throne of Fire, was released on May 4, 2011. The book takes place roughly three months after the events of The Red Pyramid.

Carter and Sadie Kane have recruited several students to follow the path of the gods, but are still fugitives from the House of Life. The young magicians secretly plan to find the long-lost king of the gods, Ra, hoping he will help them fight Apophis, a powerful god of chaos (and Ra's eternal enemy) who masterminded Set's scheme earlier that year (in The Red Pyramid). They journey across the world looking for three scrolls to awaken Ra's three aspects and to find Ra's location (as well as the location of a missing magician named Zia Rashid), and finally into the Duat to rescue Ra and drive Apophis further from the mortal world. They fail in doing so.

=== The Serpent's Shadow ===
The third book in the series, The Serpent's Shadow, was released on May 1, 2012.

A few months after the events of the previous book, the House of Life is battling repeated invasions by the forces of chaos, leading the Kanes and their trainees to look desperately for a way to stop Apophis. They finally settle on a difficult method involving part of Apophis's soul (the Serpent's sheut) and go to great lengths to ensure they will be able to use the sheut to defeat Apophis successfully. With the help of all the gods, especially Ra (hosted by Zia Rashid), the Kane siblings are able to finally banish Apophis and save their friends, although their actions have the unintended consequence of driving the gods away from the mortal world (until they can reform and find new hosts in a few hundred years).

== Supplementary works ==
=== Survival Guide ===
The Kane Chronicles: Survival Guide is a companion to the series written by Mary-Jane Knight, who is not credited on the front cover. It features illustrations of characters in the series by Antonio Caparo and full-color diagrams and maps, as well as the guide text. In the words of the publisher, the latter "teaches readers how to compile secret messages, read hieroglyphics, and recite ancient magic spells", and the intended audience includes "avid followers and budding Egyptologists alike". The book was released by Disney-Hyperion on March 20, 2012, a few months before the publication of The Serpent's Shadow. The British edition was published by Puffin Books in October of that year.

=== Guide Book ===
"Brooklyn House Magician's Manual" is the guide book to The Kane Chronicles written by Rick Riordan and released on May 1, 2018. It includes more information about the various paths of the gods, magical spells, and characters from the main series as well as Demigods and Magicians. It is narrated by Carter and Sadie Kane. It also involves first-person accounts from some of the other characters and a side plot line continuing from Demigods and Magicians involving the Kanes' recurring enemy, the evil magician Setne.

=== Graphic novel ===
A graphic novel based on The Red Pyramid was published on October 12, 2010. It follows a shortened version of Carter and Sadie's adventures in The Red Pyramid with full color drawings. It is adapted and illustrated by Orpheus Collar.

A graphic novel based on The Throne of Fire was released on October 6, 2015. Like the graphic novel for The Red Pyramid, it was adapted and illustrated by Orpheus Collar.

A graphic novel based on The Serpent's Shadow was released on October 3, 2017. Similarly to the previous two novels, it was adapted and illustrated by Orpheus Collar.

=== Demigods & Magicians ===
Three stories combining the characters of the Camp Half-Blood Chronicles and The Kane Chronicles with the first two originally appearing as short stories in the paperback versions of The Serpent's Shadow and The Mark of Athena. Eventually, the stories were combined into a miniseries known as Demigods & Magicians.

==== The Son of Sobek ====
The first ever Percy Jackson-Carter Kane crossover story was included in the back of the paperback edition of The Serpent's Shadow, published May 7, 2013, and became available as an e-single/audio purchase June 18, 2013. It was later published as part of a collection entitled Demigods & Magicians, released in 2016.

The story is told in first-person by Carter Kane and set on Long Island's south shore, in the vicinity of Moriches Bay. Carter and Percy Jackson find themselves hunting the same giant magical crocodile, and Carter is saved by Percy. Although wary of each other, they team up to fight the crocodile, which turns out to be a petsuchos, an ordinary crocodile turned to giant size and invested with the power of the Egyptian crocodile god Sobek by a magical charm. Together, they remove the charm and stop the crocodile from terrorizing the suburban neighborhood, then, after briefly introducing themselves, go their separate ways. However, Carter does leave Percy a special way of contacting him.

==== The Staff of Serapis ====
The sequel to The Son of Sobek, entitled The Staff of Serapis is the sixty-page crossover story in which Sadie and Annabeth meet. The sequel came out in April 2014, in the paperback version of The Mark of Athena, and then was released later on in the year in e-book/audiobook format read by Riordan and including a sneak preview of The Blood of Olympus. It was later published as part of a collection entitled Demigods & Magicians, released in 2016.

In this story, told from Annabeth Chase's point of view, Annabeth pursues a strange chimerical creature she encounters on the New York City Subway, and is rescued by Sadie Kane when it attacks. Sadie explains that the creature was a figurine that suddenly came to life in Brooklyn House and escaped the mansion. The two girls deduce that the creature is two parts of a tripartite creature, the Staff of Serapis, which belongs to the Hellenized Egyptian god of that name. Serapis has taken up residence in a ruined lighthouse in Far Rockaway, Queens, and Annabeth and Sadie do battle with him before returning to their separate worlds.

==== The Crown of Ptolemy ====
The Crown of Ptolemy is the third and last book in the Percy Jackson & the Olympians and The Kane Chronicles crossover series. It was published in the back of the paperback version of The House of Hades on March 31, 2015, and later as an ebook and audiobook. The ebook edition was released May 12, 2015. It was later republished as part of a collection entitled Demigods & Magicians, released in 2016.

The story is told from Percy's point of view. Percy and Annabeth are investigating Governor's Island in Manhattan, and Percy tries unsuccessfully to call Carter. Setne, the evil magician responsible for the events of the crossovers, creates a freak hurricane while attempting to make himself a god. Carter and Sadie finally arrive and, with help from the goddess Nekhbet (who uses Percy as her host for the duration of the battle), the four teenagers defeat and imprison Setne in a magical snow globe. The teens then decide to keep their mythical realities separate and head back to their respective homes, although they also decide to keep in touch.

== Adaptations ==
=== Canceled Netflix film ===
On September 12, 2020, Rick Riordan stated that Netflix was developing the series as a trilogy of feature films. After four years in development hell, Riordan revealed that the project was in "turnaround" and would not be moving forward at Netflix.

=== Television series ===
In early September 2026, it was announced that Riordan was developing a series with Angela Robinson for Disney+.
