= Carter Kane =

Fictional character in The Kane Chronicles

- The Kane Chronicles character
- First appearance: The Red Pyramid
- Last appearance: Demigods and Magicians
- Created by: Rick Riordan
- Occupation: Magician
- Abilities: Endurance/agility/superhuman senses Magical powers Teleportation; Shapeshifting; Body encasement

In-universe information
- Alias: Horus
- Species: Human (Magician)
- Gender: Male
- Title: Blood of the Pharaohs; Eye of Horus; Pharaoh of the House of Life
- Occupation: Pharaoh of the House of Life
- Family: Julius Kane (father, deceased); Ruby Kane (mother, deceased); Sadie Kane (sister); Amos Kane (uncle)
- Relatives: Ramesses II (maternal ancestor, deceased); Narmer (paternal ancestor, deceased); Khaemwaset (maternal ancestor, deceased); Mr. and Mrs. Faust (maternal grandparents)
- Nationality: American
- Weapon(s): Khopesh, combat avatar of Horus

Carter Kane is a fictional character and one of the main characters in The Kane Chronicles series, along with his younger sister, Sadie. In the novels, he follows the "path of Horus" by hosting the god. He is one of the strongest magicians in the world, next to his uncle Amos and his sister. He is in a relationship with Zia Rashid.

The character was the subject of a 2015 "whitewashing" controversy on the covers of Kane Chronicles novels, particularly foreign language editions.

== Background ==
Carter is the eldest child of Julius and Ruby Kane, who were descendants of Ancient Egyptian pharaohs Narmer and Ramesses the Great, respectively. Carter was named after Howard Carter, the archaeologist who discovered Tutankhamun's tomb. Carter and his little sister Sadie (about one and a half years younger than him) were unaware that their parents were magicians of the Per Ankh until the events of The Red Pyramid. The family lived in Los Angeles, California until Ruby's death when Carter was eight years old.

As Carter and Sadie learn later, Ruby divined that Iskandar's decision to persecute magicians who "hosted" gods would hasten Apophis's escape from his magical prison. Ruby and Julius decided to illegally gather the gods in preparation for his eventual escape, starting with Bast, a goddess tasked with fighting Apophis for eternity. The Kanes were successful in freeing Bast, but when Apophis tried to escape as well, Ruby chose to sacrifice herself to keep him contained. A shattered Julius swore to find a way to reunite with her and finish their mission to bring the gods back into the word.

Carter's maternal grandparents, Mr. and Mrs. Faust, later took Julius to court and won custody of Sadie. Carter was left to be raised by his father. He was allowed to see his sister twice a year, but was otherwise constantly on the move as his father evaded magicians from the House of Life seeking to arrest him. Carter sometimes regretted his father's strict parenting style, but strove to emulate him. He acquired the habits of always dressing "like a junior professor", living out of a single suitcase, following basketball (especially the Los Angeles Lakers), and reading avidly.

=== The Red Pyramid ===
Six years after Ruby Kane's death, Carter and his sister become unknowing hosts to the gods Horus and Isis when their father releases these gods into the mortal world. Over the course of the novel, Carter and Sadie work to foil the evil plans of another freed god, Set. After the capture and later death of their father, their paternal uncle Amos takes the siblings into his custody; his mental illness at the end of the novel leaves the siblings with only the goddess Bast as a guardian. Over the course of the novel, Carter is forced to assume the role of older brother and take on a greater level of independence than he has previously experienced. As Elizabeth Bush says in a review of the novel, the "bittersweet ending lays the foundation for subsequent titles" and character growth.

Carter also learns to accept the facets of his personality which make him similar to Horus—namely, his ability to lead and his courage in the face of danger—and learns that it is not disrespectful to his father to relax his standards a little and become his own person. Despite his newfound individuality, he retains many of his father's values and attributes. He vows to find the real Zia Rashid (a young girl to whom he is attracted) over her dying shabti "body", much as his father did for his mother. Carter acquires a khopesh in Amos's mansion which becomes his weapon of choice throughout the series. He begins to specialize in combat magic, and inherits his father's magic kit.

=== The Throne of Fire ===
Three months after the defeat of Set, Carter, Sadie, and Bast have begun to educate a group of about twenty initiates about the Path of the Gods. In this novel, the trio and their trainees work to find Ra, a powerful god who will help them in their upcoming fight with Apophis. Carter experiences a number of traumatic experiences in the novel, including the near death of himself and (separately) a trainee named Jaz; the loss of a close friend, Bes; and the disappointment of Ra's inadequacy coupled with his former enemy Michel Desjardins's ultimate sacrifice to protect the Kanes from Apophis.

The novel is characterized by Carter's eye-opening experiences and his "becoming the [hero] that destiny demands". When he is poisoned by a tjesu heru (Egyptian pushmi-pullyu), Sadie is forced to analyze his ren to learn his secret name -- "the sum of [his] experiences, even those [he'd] never want to share". He says this event "felt like [Sadie had] opened me up on the surgery table, examined me, and sewn me back together". Carter also struggles with his new and almost-obsessive love for Zia Rashid, and has to balance his desire to protect her with his duty to the rest of the world; and cope when she admits that she does not feel the same for him. On top of all this, Carter is also learning to be a leader for children his own age and older, annoyed by his sister's rebellious nature and occasional lack of responsibility. His visit to the palace of Osiris in the underworld, where he sees his deceased parents, comforts him but reinforces the knowledge that he will never be able to live with them.

=== The Serpent's Shadow ===
The 21st Nome's situation is dire in the opening of the final book, as Apophis is soon to escape and the magicians are still searching for a way to defeat him. The Kanes spend the course of the book recruiting all the Egyptian gods and gathering information about a dangerous spell to execrate the dangerous Apophis. For a short while, Carter struggles to channel Horus because the war god believes they should try an all-out assault on Apophis, rather than risk hunting for the spell and its ingredients. The magicians manage to banish Apophis, but this disruption of the balance between Order (Ma'at) and Chaos (Isfet) forces the gods to retreat from the world, including Horus, Isis, Ra, and Carter's father Julius (host to Osiris).

The Serpent's Shadow represents Carter's final transformation into a leader and the head of his family (with his mother and father now completely out of the picture). Because of his victory over the serpent, Carter is named pharaoh of the House of Life, though he chooses not to exercise this power until he has matured. He decides to continue life as a "normal" high school student while living at the Brooklyn House with his trainees. Carter also begins a romantic relationship with Zia Rashid.

== Description ==
Carter is an African American teenager and closely resembles his father, Julius, in appearance. He bears little to no resemblance to his sister and mother, both of whom are Caucasian in appearance. Because of this difference in appearance, few people initially realize that he and Sadie are siblings, something Carter has grown used to. Carter typically carries an Eye of Horus symbol, a gift from his father. Later, some of Horus's essence is left in the symbol and he removes it so as not to be tempted to use the power. Carter's ba is a falcon with a human head, recalling Horus.

=== Cover art controversy ===
Carter has frequently been "whitewashed" on covers of Kane Chronicles non-English edition novels, such as in Russia, the Netherlands, Italy, and more. Even the American covers depict Carter in a way that makes it difficult to tell if he has the "dark brown skin" he is said to have in the series, though he still appears more African American than on many other editions. Riordan complained about the issue on both his Twitter and Tumblr pages repeatedly, saying, "... the whitewashing of Carter Kane continues. Ugh." and "Pretty art but I'm not amused how they whitewash Carter." He later announced that the Dutch and Russian editions had fixed covers.

=== Personality ===
Carter Kane is very protective of his family and friends (especially Zia Rashid), and will do anything to ensure their safety. He tends to be a gentleman because of the way his father raised him, and is always thinking of how to solve their next problem. He is described as nerdy, bookish, and formal.

=== Powers and abilities ===
Magic: Carter is a very powerful magician, though is not formally trained. He has more experience than the initiates of the other Nomes, and his progress is quickened due to the Path of the Gods. Carter's specialty is combat magic although he can use other techniques granted by the Path of Horus. He can also use hieroglyphic spells and has been known to be able to speak about half a dozen Divine Words. Carter also has the ability to transform into a falcon. Whilst being the Eye of Horus, Carter had the ability to transform other beings into animals for a short duration.

Combat Skills: During The Red Pyramid, Carter shows superhuman reflexes whilst in a battle. He deflects daggers at remarkable speeds and even dodges a dagger. Although he usually uses combat magic, Carter was once forced to use pure combat skills against opponents due to his link with Horus not being very strong. He managed to hold his own against Sobek's crocodiles, and was able to hold his own against Percy Jackson, despite the latter being the better sword fighter. Percy himself told Carter that he was one of the few people to fight him well.

Animal Charming: As a result of following the Path of Horus, Carter has the ability to control the god's sacred animals such as falcons, griffins and snakes. He first used this ability to tame Freak the griffin in The Throne of Fire and it has allowed him to control the griffin and understand him to an extent since.

==== Weapons ====
Khopesh: Carter used a khopesh from Brooklyn House, during the Red Pyramid and the first part of the Throne of Fire. He later lost his sword while fighting the Tjesu heru and wasn't able to retrieve it. Carter found himself a new khopesh in The Serpent's Shadow, but again lost it in a fight with a massive hippo demon. By the Son of Sobek, he has possession of another khopesh. This is Carter's main offensive weapon.

Wand: Carter used his wand through the Red Pyramid and the Throne of Fire, until his encounter with the water demons. He later used his wand from his father's tool kit and is still using it. He can summon a shield of force around himself, by focusing his will. Carter can also send a burst of magic into anything his wand is in contact with to shock them, however this does not work with Percy Jackson and in extension, to any demigods. This is Carter's main defensive weapon.

Crook and flail: At times, Carter has been able to use the crook and flail of the sun god Ra. This enhances his own abilities to the extent that he can make gods bow to him and in a rage, harm Apophis where nothing else affected him. While Ra gave him the crook and flail to keep, he decided to leave them in the First Nome and only use them in big battles.

Shabti: While Carter was initially not very good at creating magical figurines, he has proven capable of using them, such as using his father's Doughboy in The Red Pyramid and using the shabti of Apophis to destroy him. He has grown better over time with them, now carrying wax to form them in his kit and able to shape a shabti on the fly without even looking. In this case, the shabti was rather deformed, but it was due to a lack of time to finish properly.
