= John Rocco =

American illustrator of book covers and children's books

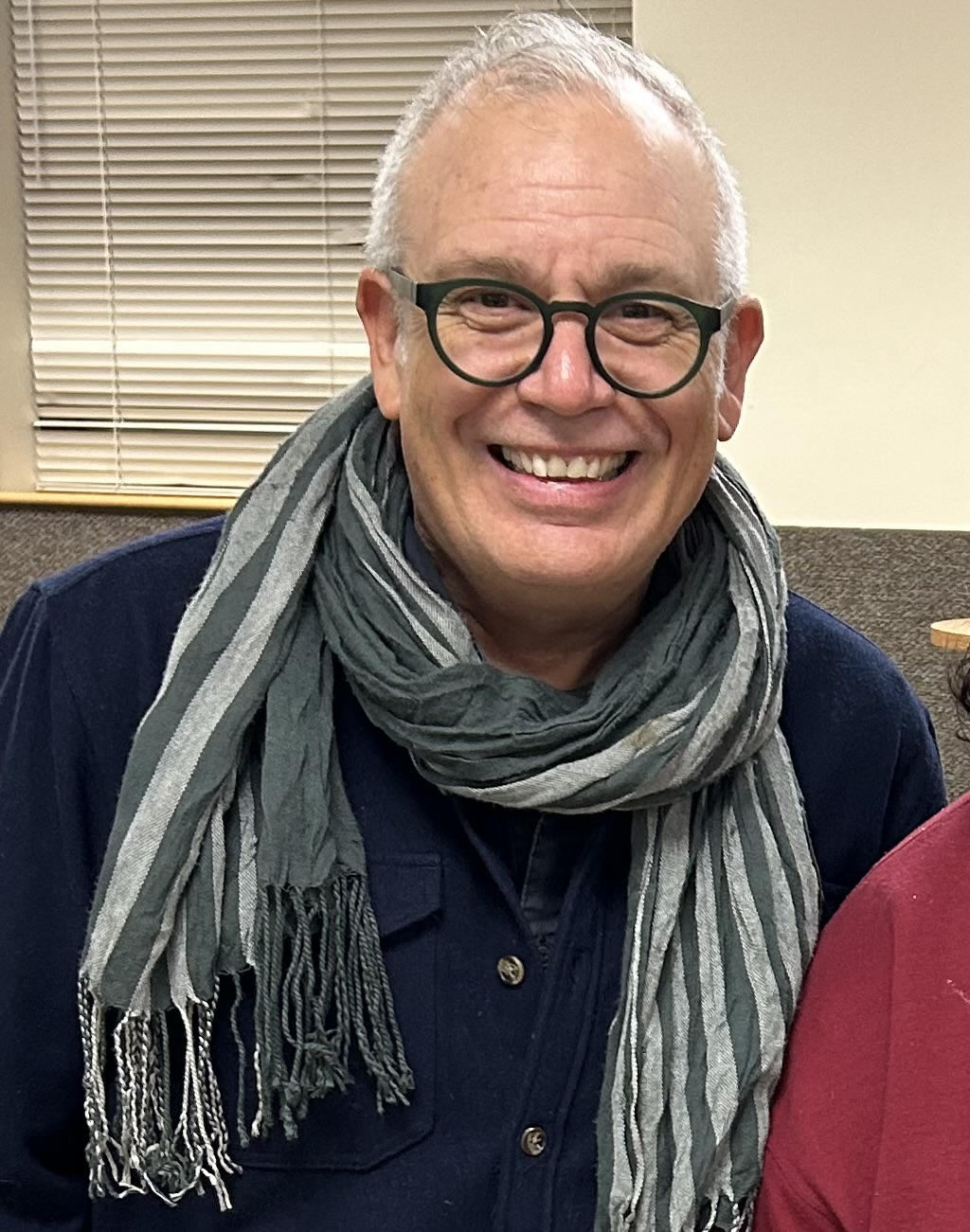
Rocco in 2025

Christopher John Rocco (born July 9, 1967), (Note: The U.S. Library of Congress cites 2007 email correspondence with Rocco's publisher, for his full name and date of birth, and otherwise cites his website as of March 2012.) simply known as John Rocco is an American illustrator of book covers and children's books. He is best known for illustrating the covers of books in the Percy Jackson & the Olympians series. He is the sole creator of some children's picture books.

== Personal life ==
Rocco was raised in Barrington, Rhode Island. He studied illustration at the Rhode Island School of Design and at the School of Visual Arts in New York City and earned a degree from the latter.

== Career ==
Rocco did not take drawing seriously until he was 19 years old. Rocco has also been an international art director in the entertainment industry. Rocco was the pre-production art director at DreamWorks for the film Shrek. He designed attractions at Disney's Epcot and served as art director for DisneyQuest.

Two companion books to the Percy Jackson series were published in 2014 and 2015, with lavish interior illustrations by Rocco, Percy Jackson's Greek Gods and Percy Jackson's Greek Heroes. Regarding the first Kirkus Reviews observed in a starred review, "Riordan has a sure touch when it comes to fitting much into a small space—as does Rocco’s artwork, which smokes and writhes on the page as if hit by lightning ...". John Rocco spent 18 months as animation director at ImagineAsia in Manila, Philippines. Rocco worked on and oversaw several projects while there involving CGI animation, motion capture, and story development.

== Awards ==
Rocco was a runner-up for the American Library Association Caldecott Medal, which annually recognizes the best in U.S. children's picture book illustration, when Blackout was named a Caldecott Honor Book in 2012. Rocco's book How We Got to the Moon was one of the ten books selected on the longlist for the 2020 National Book Award for Young People's Literature.

- Borders Original Voices Award for best picture book
- Original Art Show at the Society of Illustrators
- New York Times Best Book of the Year
- 2015 Irma Black Award Honor for Blizzard

== Works ==
=== Children's books as writer ===
- Wolf! Wolf! (Hyperion Books for Children, 2007), picture book – "The Boy Who Cried Wolf" told from the wolf's point of view and set in Asia, LCCN 2007-4636, Rocco's first book as writer
- Moonpowder (Hyperion Books for Children, 2008)
- Fu Finds the Way (Disney Hyperion, 2009)
- Blackout (Disney Hyperion, 2011)
- Super Hair-o and the Barber of Doom (Disney Hyperion, 2013)
- Blizzard (Disney Hyperion, October 2014), LCCN 2014-3220 – companion to Blackout; based on his Rhode Island childhood experience in the New England blizzard of 1978
- Swim that Rock, Rocco and Jay Primiano (Candlewick Press, 2014), 293 pp. unillus., LCCN 2013-952797 - a "middle grade/YA novel" by Rocco and an old friend, the "captain of the shellfishing boat I worked on as a child".

=== As illustrator only ===
Interior illustrations

- Alice, picture book written by Whoopi Goldberg (Bantam Books, 1992)
- Boy, Were We Wrong about the Solar System, Kathleen V. Kudlinski (Dutton Children's Books, 2008)
- The Flint Heart: a fairy story, Katherine and John Paterson (Candlewick, 2011) – "freely abridged from Eden Phillpotts's 1910 fantasy", LCCN 2010-48225
- The Hunter Chronicles by E. J. Patten (Simon & Schuster Books for Children)
  - Return to Exile (2011), snare 1, LCCN 2010-53480
  - The Legend Thief (2013), snare 2
- How to Train a Train, Jason Carter Eaton (Candlewick, 2013)
- Beep! Beep! Go to Sleep!, Todd Tarpley (Little, Brown, 2015)
- How to Track a Truck, Jason Carter Eaton (Candlewick, 2016)
- Percy Jackson's Greek Gods, Rick Riordan (Disney Hyperion, 2014) – illustrated with more than 60 paintings
- Percy Jackson's Greek Heroes, Rick Riordan (Disney Hyperion, 2015)
- How to Send a Hug, Hayley Rocco (Little, Brown, 2022)

Cover and dustjacket art

- Camp Half-Blood chronicles by Rick Riordan (2005 to present)
- The Kane Chronicles trilogy by Riordan (2010–2012)
- Magnus Chase and the Gods of Asgard trilogy by Riordan (2015–present)
- Ring of Fire (novel) by Pierdomenico Baccalario (2009-2012)
- Alex and the Ironic Gentleman by Adrienne Kress (2008)

Another artist illustrated the first edition dustjacket for at least the first Camp Half-Blood Chronicles novel by Rick Riordan,The Lightning Thief. Before the end of the Percy Jackson & the Olympians subseries (2005 to 2009), all volumes were in print with stylistically matching dustjackets illustrated by Rocco. New cover illustrations from a single Rocco painting that spans all five books were introduced early in 2014. (Note: According to Rocco his first reaction was that "because of the popularity of the books they had become very iconic", evidently concerning his cover illustrations for all five novels.)
