= Fablehaven (novel) =

Children's fantasy novel

- Cover of the hardcover edition
- Author: Brandon Mull
- Illustrator: Brandon Dorman
- Language: English
- Series: Fablehaven
- Genre: Fantasy
- Publisher: Shadow Mountain Publishing (hardcover); Aladdin Paperbacks (paperback)
- Publication date: June 14, 2006
- Publication place: United States
- Media type: Print (hardcover & paperback), ebook and audiobook
- Pages: 368 (hardcover); 351 (paperback)
- ISBN: 978-1-59038-581-4
- OCLC: 285537351
- Followed by: Fablehaven: Rise of the Evening Star

Fablehaven is a 2006 fantasy novel written by Brandon Mull. The book centers on two siblings, Kendra and Seth Sorenson, who visit their grandfather's mansion, which unbeknownst to most of the world, is a reserve for mystical creatures. The grandfather and the caretakers are eventually kidnapped by imps, forcing the siblings to find and rescue them while a witch named Muriel plans to unleash a powerful demon named Bahumat.

Mull, having wanted to become a fantasy novelist ever since he was a child, submitted a manuscript to various publishers. Though the manuscript was rejected, Chris Schoebinger of Shadow Mountain Publishing took a liking for Mull's writing style and suggested to Mull writing a different type of novel. The novel would become Fablehaven, which took five months to write. The book was published on June 14, 2006.

Fablehaven was met with commercial success and generally positive reception. It sold 20,000 copies a few months after release, and eventually reached two million copies sold in the United States by 2011. It was the first book of a five-book series, which lasted from 2006 to 2010 and would become a New York Times bestseller. Mull eventually wrote and released Dragonwatch, a sequel series that lasted from 2017 to 2021.

== Plot ==
Kendra and Seth Sorenson, two siblings, visit their grandfather, Stan Sorenson, for a few weeks. When they arrive, they find their grandmother, Ruth, missing, and are informed that she is visiting a relative. Their grandfather informs them that there are disease-bearing ticks in the wood adjoining his house, and forbids them from entering the woods. Seth, however, disobeys him and explores the woods. He encounters an old woman in a shack, who tries to lure him inside. Unnerved by the experience, he returns to the house and persuades Kendra to join him in another woods excursion. Stan finds out about their forbidden ventures and explains that he keeps endangered species of lethal animals in the woods, which is why he told them not to enter the woods. Seth and Kendra convince him to lessen their punishment.

Shortly afterward, Kendra follows a series of clues given to her by Stan, which leads her to an instruction to drink unpasteurized milk straight from the cow on the farm. She had previously been warned against doing so by Dale, Stan's hired man. Hesitant to sample the milk, she persuades Seth to try the milk first. After he tastes the milk, Seth claims to be able to see fairies in the garden. Kendra drinks the milk herself and sees them too. Stan confronts them and explains that there are still magical beings in the world, mostly contained in preserves. His grounds are one of these preserves, designated Fablehaven. He explains that the old woman, whom Seth met is a witch named Muriel Taggert, and explains to them the real reason why they are not allowed in the woods: dangerous magical beings such as demons and specters are contained there.

Stan also informs them that Midsummer's Eve is approaching, a festival night on which the boundaries containing magical entities dissolve. The creatures are free to roam and wreak havoc everywhere on the preserve, except the house; they cannot enter the house unless a door or window is opened to them. Stan places Seth and Kendra in the attic, warning them not to leave their beds till morning, but a set of goblins trick Seth into opening a window. Though Seth and Kendra are unharmed, the goblins provide entrance to other creatures, wreaking havoc in the house, turning Dale into a statue, and abducting Stan and Lena, the ex-naiad housekeeper. After an unsuccessful attempt to find Stan, the siblings return to the house. A message written with chicken seeds makes the siblings realize that their pet chicken is actually Ruth in an enchanted state. They take her to Muriel to release her from the spell, but in exchange, Muriel demands that they undo the spells binding her to the shack. After Ruth is transformed back into herself and Muriel is released, Ruth persuades Nero, a cliff troll, to tell them Stan's location in exchange for a massage. Nero informs them that Stan is held in the Forgotten Chapel.

Ruth tells Kendra and Seth that the Forgotten Chapel is actually a containment facility for one of the most powerful demons in existence, Bahumat. They realize that Muriel is trying to release Bahumat, and the three attempt to stop her, but Muriel and her minions capture them all except for Kendra, who manages to escape. In desperation, she goes to the Fairy Queen's shrine, despite the potentially dangerous ramifications, and begs the Fairy Queen for help. The Queen spares Kendra's life, and provides her with instructions on how to create an elixir to enlarge the fairies and enhance their powers. Kendra creates the elixir and gives it to the fairies.

The enlarged fairies attack Bahumat and turn corrupted versions of themselves back to their original form. They re-imprison Bahumat and Muriel and release the humans imprisoned. Each of the fairies transfers their extra energy to Kendra, returning to their normal sizes in the process. This leaves Kendra with the ability to see magical creatures without consuming milk. As the school year starts and their parents collect them from Fablehaven, Kendra wonders what other magical wonders are present in the world.

== Background and publication history ==
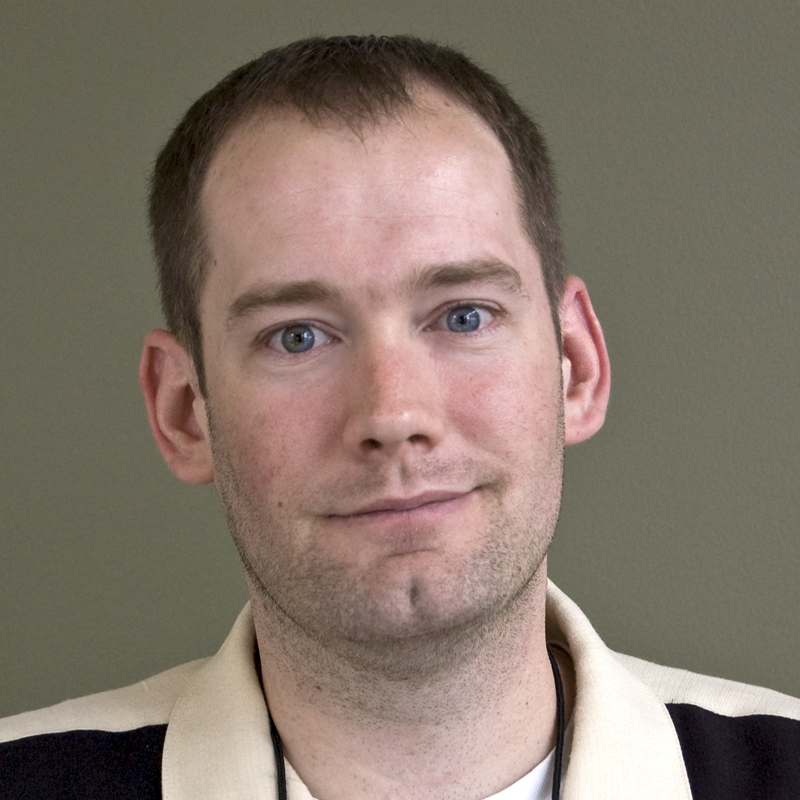
Brandon Mull (pictured in 2008) is the author of Fablehaven.

Brandon Mull had wanted to become a fantasy novelist ever since reading The Chronicles of Narnia, The Lord of the Rings, and Harry Potter while growing up. As an adult working in the marketing field to support his family in Utah, he would secretly write fictional stories off-hours, a hobby he had since he was teenager. Mull eventually wrote the manuscript for his first novel and tried to have it published. While various publishing companies rejected the manuscript, it caught the attention of Chris Schoebinger, the public director of Shadow Mountain Publishing. Schoebinger liked Mull's writing style and suggested writing a different type of novel to him, which would become Fablehaven.

Mull cites the three childhood books as his main influence on Fablehaven. The setting of Fablehaven is based on Mull's daydreams in Connecticut forests. As a child, he would daydream about fantasy creatures in the forests and think of an excuse of why those creatures would be in the forest; they lived in secret wildlife parks. Various other details of Fablehaven were based on aspects of Mull's life. The character of Seth was based on Mull's brother, Bryson, while Muriel was based on an Arabic word associated with witchcraft that translates to "one who blows on knots".

Fablehaven took five months to write and was the first book written by Brandon Mull to be published. Brandon Dorman is the illustrator and cover artist of Fablehaven. The book was released on June 14, 2006, with Shadow Mountain Publishing publishing the hardcover editions and Aladdin Paperbacks publishing the paperback editions. As of 2012, Fablehaven is available in more than 25 languages and territories.

== Reception ==
Fablehaven was a success; it sold 20,000 copies by September 2006, as reported by Deseret News. In May 2007, the Pleasant Grove Review reported that the hardback edition of Fablehaven sold over 75,000 copies. Later that same year, the Daily Herald reported that Fablehaven and its sequel, Fablehaven: Rise of the Evening Star sold 200,000 copies together. Fablehaven entered The New York Times bestseller list in November 2007. The Daily Universe reported that Fablehaven had sold 2 million copies in the United States by 2011. Deseret News stated that Fablehaven "ha[d] been sold in more than 25 languages and territories" and particularly sold well in France, making it in its best-selling lists for six weeks.

The reviews for Fablehaven were generally positive. Various reviewers have favorably compared Fablehaven to the Harry Potter series, including author Orson Scott Card. Card praised Mull for successfully writing a story "in which magic and fairy realms intersect", a style he considers "devilishly hard to write", with Fablehaven. He also defended its religious themes in response to an email. Obert Skye, another author, found the world of Fablehaven to be creepy in some aspects, but inviting in others. Stacy Whitman of Dialogue: A Journal of Mormon Thought opined that the book "skirts the edge of the line between telling a good story well and allowing the message to overshadow the story".

Columbia Daily Tribune's Holly E. Newton wrote that the book is "so compelling and so well written" that readers will not be able to stop reading Fablehaven. Scott Iwasaki from Deseret News called the book "a quick-paced read" that successfully explores a fantasy world. In contrast, Kirkus Reviews criticized the book having Seth disobeying an adult being used as a frequent plot device, and stated that "[w]itty repartee between the central characters, as well as the occasional well-done set piece, isn't enough to hold this hefty debut together". Matt Berman of Common Sense Media similarly criticized the plot device and called the characters of Seth and Kendra "stereotypes".

== Franchise ==
Fablehaven was followed by four other books; Fablehaven: Rise of the Evening Star was released on May 1, 2007, Fablehaven: Grip of the Shadow Plague on April 21, 2008, Fablehaven: Secrets of the Dragon Sanctuary on March 24, 2009, and Fablehaven: Keys to the Demon Prison on March 23, 2010. The series has become a New York Times bestselling series, and Mull has visited over 600 schools in over 30 states to promote it to students. The potential of a film adaptation has been discussed, with the rights to one even being optioned a couple of times. Mull has stated that he believes that one will eventually be released.

Mull later wrote and released a five-book sequel series to the Fablehaven series, known as Dragonwatch. Caretaker's Guide to Fablehaven, released on October 13, 2015, was written as an encyclopedia of the setting of Fablehaven in preparation for the release of Dragonwatch. Dragonwatch: A Fablehaven Adventure was released on March 14, 2017, Dragonwatch: Wrath of the Dragon King on October 23, 2018, Dragonwatch: Master of the Phantom Isle on October 1, 2019, Dragonwatch: Champion of the Titan Games on October 13, 2020, and Dragonwatch: Return of the Dragon Slayers on October 26, 2021.
