= List of Fablehaven's magical creatures =

This is a list of magical creatures and beings in the fantasy book series Fablehaven and the sequel series Dragonwatch by Brandon Mull.

== A-C ==
Alcetaur
Similar to a centaur except with the body of a moose. In Book 4, an Alcetaur was one of the sentries at Blackwell Keep's front gate. In Dragonwatch, this Alcetaur is Wyrmroost's gamekeeper, and a major character. His name is Henrick, and he accompanies and assists Kendra and Seth with their main mission.

Apparition
Ghostly forms that look identical to humans except a little translucent. An apparition warns Seth of the dangers he might face on Lady Luck.

Astrids
Large golden owls with human faces, able to transform into winged men. It is said by Ruth (Grandma) Sorenson that they are very mysterious, and that little is known about them. Kendra saw one during the time between visits to the preserve, between books 1 and 2. Seth may have also seen one in Book 2, without having drunk the milk. It was in the appearance of a regular black owl, but he knew it was not what it appeared. In Book 4, they were revealed to have been the former servants of the Fairy Queen, and the bodyguards of the Fairy King, but they were full of pride, and they failed in their duty, resulting in the downfall of the King, the fall of all male faries (and subsequent rise of Imps), and their banishment from the queen's service. Only 93 of them exist (not including the three that were killed by Navarog), and six of them turned dark when they were banished. In Book 5, they are unbanished by the Fairy Queen and are transformed to their true forms: men in golden armor with large wings. Some of their names are Peredor, Denwin, Targoron, Silvestrus, Rostimus, Crelang and Gilgarol, who was the Captain of the Astrids. They help in the battle against the demons released from Zzyzx. Bracken once reveals that their regiment was called the Knights of the Dawn, the same name that the brotherhood in opposition of the Society took. In Book 4 of Dragonwatch, Seth and Merek are given astrid wings by the Fairy King.

Basilisks
Powerful and dangerous creatures that inhabit the Dragon Sanctuary, Wyrmroost, as listed by Agad, the caretaker.

Blixes
Magical beings in human form that can exert power over others through a bite, of which the myth of vampires was based. The three blixes explained in Rise of the Evening Star are:
- Viviblix can temporarily reanimate the dead. In Book 2, Errol Fisk claims the curator of a mortuary as a Viviblix, and likely has turned some of the dead in his care to zombies (which is a lie he invented to convince Seth to awaken the demon the curator was guarding). At the end of Book 3, several skeletons from the museum at Lost Mesa suddenly come to life and help overthrow the preserve. Navarog reveals at the end of Book 4 that it was Mr. Lich who made this possible. It is confirmed in Book 5 that he is a viviblix.
- Narcoblix can control the actions of others while they are sleeping. Vanessa Santoro, first mentioned in Book 2, is a Narcoblix and bites others in their sleep in an attempt to overthrow the preserve. She is thwarted and put in the Quiet Box to keep her from controlling those she had bitten. She appears sporadically throughout the third and fourth books, but is finally freed in the fifth, when she helps the Knights of the Dawn battle the Society of the Evening Star. Another narcoblix named Wayne is confronted at Obsidian Waste.
- Lectoblix age quickly, and survive by draining the youth of others. In Book 4, Torina Barker reveals herself to Kendra as a Lectoblix. Held captive with Kendra are several 'elderly' victims of the lectoblix. Out of 'kindness' she allowed them some years left to live, but others she absorbed all youth out until they perished from old age. She appears several times in the fifth book, pursuing the Knights of the Dawn on Obsidian Waste, and hunting down the Eternals.

Brownies
Brownies are flightless fairy folk who love to fix things that are broken, and improving them where possible. Also, when ingredients are left out, they will bake something delicious, although they always attempt to make it into a dessert. Grandma Sorenson mentions in the second book that brownies invented the delicious dessert, brownies, which is how they got their name. In the first book, when goblins and other unfriendly creatures from Fablehaven raid and wreck the house on Midsummer's Eve, the brownies repair it in short length of time. In Book 2, Kendra and Seth have to shrink themselves and pass through the underground Brownie community to get inside the house. In Book 3, the brownies become affected by the shadow plague and fill the house with deadly traps.

Centaur
Strong and intelligent beings that are part horse, and part man, the Centaurs have only really played a role in the third and fifth book, with some presence in the fourth. They are portrayed as being very noble and prideful. The three centaurs mentioned in the third book are Stormbrow, Cloudwing, and Broadhoof. In Book 4, their most treasured item is the Soul of Grunhold or the first horn of a unicorn. The names of other centaurs are Quickstride, Bloodthorn, Skygazer, Fleetfoot, Edgerunner, and Graymane who is the leader of the centaurs, and counsels with Stan Sorenson regarding their prized talisman, the unicorn horn or "Soul of Grunhold". In Book 5, when Fablehaven falls, the Centaurs try to take over the preserve.

Cervitaur
Described in Dragonwatch as men with bodies of deer.

Chimera
Thronis, the sky giant, obtains a magic figurine, that when uttered the correct words, will become an actual chimera, obedient to his will. Chimeras are mentioned as one of the creatures inhabiting the Living Mirage preserve. It is mostly a fire breathing, three headed lion but has a goat head in the center of its back and its tail is similar to a snake's.

Choke pod: A small pod that when touched explodes into a poison that kills quickly and then liquefies the body it kills. In Book 3, Neil got hit by a choke pod at Lost Mesa.

Cockatrice
One of these killed Raxtus's siblings while they were eggs, but was stopped by fairies before it killed Raxtus.

Cyclops
Cyclops is a one-eyed giant. In Rise of the Evening Star, Vanessa and Errol had to get past one guarding the artifact in the inverted tower. A Cyclops also appears at the final battle between dark and light creatures in Grip of the Shadow Plague. In Dragonwatch Book 2, Kendra meets Bag Zou, the leader of the Western Cyclopses at Dragon's Feast of Welcome.

== D-F ==
Demon
One of the most powerful magical creatures, demons are often the villains in the Fablehaven series. Several demons are mentioned in the series. They are:
- Bahumat from Book 1, a monster that stands three times as tall as a man, with the head of a dragon crowned with three horns. He has three arms, three legs and three tails. He has oily black scales with bristly spikes. He is able to emit a wave of darkness to blind his foes, and has a deafening roar.
- Batoosa: A Chilean demon suggested by Jubaya that could be helpful in dealing with the Dragon Uprising in Dragonwatch. He changes shape with the seasons of the year, and has a fondness for meat.
- Brogo: An enormous demon with an iron mask in the form of a very fat and muscular giant, he is one of the sons of Gorgrog, and said to be one of the strongest demons in history. He loses an arm to Celebrant after Zzyzx is open.
- Chazrah the Reaper: An imprisoned demon, like a centaur but with the body of a panther, he grudgingly serves those who seek to confer with Orogoro, and his eyes are sewn shut, probably as some sort of punishment.
- Din Bidor: A huge wolf demon with long fangs and black fur, darkness and fear increases its size.
- Graulas: An ancient demon who was once one of the most feared demons in the world, but is now long past his prime due to a wasting illness. He basically made Fablehaven his home to await death. He radiates magical fear, and has the ability to see almost anything on the preserve. In Books 3 and 4 he aids Seth in overcoming the Shadow Plague, and officially makes him a shadow charmer. In Book 5, he is first seen meeting with Seth, finally dying, though it is taking very long. He asks Seth that, should he have the chance, to return with the Sands of Sanctity and use it on him, to lessen his dying pain, and Seth agrees. When Seth returns to fulfill his promise, he tricks Seth into healing him with the Sands of Sanctity and steals both the Sands and the Translocator, and helped Nagi Luna open Zzyzx. It is later revealed that in his earlier years he used a powerful gem called the Wizenstone to pull off numerous dark deeds, after double-crossing many powerful monarchs and peoples.
- Gorgrog: The king of Demons, responsible for the downfall of the Fairy King, he fought the Knights when Zzyzx was opened, nearly killing Bracken and the Fairy Queen.
- Humbuggle: A shape-shifting, extremely clever dwarf who concocted elaborate schemes using the powerful Wizenstone, such as the Games, he changes sides throughout the Dragonwatch series, always benefitting himself, and after a final betrayal is locked in the new demon prison.
- Ixyria: A muscular female serpent with four arms, said to be mentor to witches and hags.
- Jubaya: Resembling a giant praying mantis, she lives in a mud pit and corrupts anything she touches. She gives advice to Kendra on dealing with the dragon uprising in Dragonwatch.
- Kurisock: A demon more of shadow than substance, perhaps the least is known of him, other than being confined to his lair, which is a cursed tar pit far inside Fablehaven. To interact with the material world, he binds himself to a host, giving the host greater power. He bound himself to the hamadryad Ephira, infusing her with dark power, and through whom the Shadow Plague was created and spread.
- Lycerna: A gargantuan serpentine demon who has taken over a secret preserve in Brazil.
- Nagi Luna: In the shape of a wrinkled old woman with purple skin and yellow eyes, she was in league with the Sphinx until Graulas took over and freed her. She helped orchestrate the opening of Zzyzx.
- Olloch: Also known as Olloch the Glutton, Olloch is a frog-like monster with several flailing tongues and an insatiable appetite. He is under a spell which keeps him trapped as a tiny statue with a sign that warns people not to feed him. If someone makes the mistake of feeding the dormant statue, Olloch will bite the feeder and eventually devour them, thus turning him into a statue again. As he eats, he grows in size and power. In Rise of the Evening Star he grows in size to "much bigger than the elephants Seth had seen at the zoo".
- Orogoro: A hulking shaggy demon with moose antlers, the eldest son of Gorgrog, he is fond of cruel deals and has Seth stabbed with a cursed weapon known as the Unforgiving Blade in book 5 of the Dragonwatch series.

- Raisha: A demon whom Kendra met in book 5 of the Dragonwatch series, she had been imprisoned by trolls, and when the town of Humburgh was destroyed she attempted to escape. Before she could however, the building she was in collapsed, eventually crushing her. She gave Kendra advice before she died, telling her to seek out the demons Jubaya had recommended in book 1.

- Talizar: Resembling a man with the head like a wolf, Talizar visits Seth in a dream requesting a partnership to deal with the dragon uprising in Dragonwatch. He explains to Kendra later that he was once a lycanthrope.
- Vez Radim: A demon suggested by Jubaya that could be helpful in dealing with the Dragon Uprising in Dragonwatch, he cannot go out in the sunlight, and is very similar to a vampire.
- Zorat the Plagueman: A pale, thin, very tall man pocked with sores and sickness, capable wiping out the enemy with disease.

Dire Bears
Giant, aggressive bears that attack Kendra and Seth at Wyrmroost.

Dragon
Large, powerful and intelligent winged reptiles, they are described to be the ultimate predator. Most humans freeze in body and mind from a paralyzing terror in their presence, similar to the effects of being near a revenant. Several dragons are identified in the series.
- Abraxas: The first dragon, who was presumably fire-breathing, he was later slain by Konrad the Legender for unknown reasons, and his skull was turned into the Sovereign Skull, a powerful talisman that protects the mortal world from dragons.
- Archadius was an ancient and wise dragon, and the first dragon to change permanently into a wizard. He discovered that when a dragon assumed human form permanently, their magic would be much more powerful. He is mentioned in Book 4 by Agad, who helped him become a wizard. When he was a dragon, he was known as Archanon, and as a wizard captured Gorgrog.
- Baltazar: The dragon who received secret info from the traitor Tonak the Minotaur.
- Berzog: A dragon in Skyhold covered with giant quills like a porcupine.
- Burelli: Covered in thick coarse brown hair, Burelli is a huge dragon with wide horns who was guarding the hidden scepter at Wyrmroost.
- Camarat was one of the sentries to visitors seeking entrance to Wyrmroost. He is red and gold, long and snakelike with 8 sets of legs, the head and mane like a lion. His breath weapon was a sort of truth serum. He allowed the team to pass through to Blackwell Keep. He was briefly seen as the Knights battled the demons from Zzyzx. He and Agad are brothers. In Dragonwatch, Camarat, in human form and known as Marat, takes over from Agad as temporary caretaker until Kendra and Seth arrive to assume the post.
- Celebrant is the king of dragons. He is the father of Raxtus and resides at the top of Moonfang, the highest peak at Wyrmroost. Raxtus says that he is one of the biggest dragons in existence, with five breath weapons and in the Book 5 he is in the party of dragons that comes to Zzyzx to aid the Knights of the Dawn. His favorite breath weapon is a huge beam of white light. In Dragonwatch, Celebrant is the primary antagonist who tries to take over the sanctuary and free the dragons, urging them to form an army, but his own arrogance causes his demise.
- Chalize was guarding the artifact room at Lost Mesa in Grip of the Shadow Plague. She was a young dragon, not more than 100 years old, more metallic than usual, with copper alloy scales. She apparently has lightning as a breath weapon, like her mother Nafia, and used it to overthrow the Lost Mesa preserve.
- Chiro: A female dragon with spikes down her neck that spews acid, Chiro had a voice like a soprano choir. She was one of the dragons sent by Celebrant to apprehend Kendra and Seth, but was defeated by the Somber Knight.
- Dromadus: A former dragon king at Wyrmroost, who gave up his crown to become a pacifist, Dromadus is the biggest dragon Kendra and Seth have ever seen, and appears to be made of rock. He helped Kendra and Seth with their mission. In human form he is known as Andromadus.
- Ezarod: Dromadus' nephew who attempted to take his crown.
- Glommus: An old, gray, blind dragon who attempts to destroy the party as they infiltrate the Dragon Temple with a powerful sleep-inducing breath, Glommus was killed by Vanessa, who was currently inhabiting the body of Tanu.
- Grugnar of Old: A dragon in history that had developed the Seething Night breath weapon.
- Horus is a former dragon king, who was presumably killed by Celebrant, as he was king before him.
- Jaleesa: A large green Dragon with emerald scales and a pair of fins just behind her head, she captured Kendra in her mouth and transported her to Skyhold. She lost an arm in Stormguard Castle in a conflict with Seth, and her other one in Humburgh.
- Jibarro: A huge sea dragon that guards the entrance to the Under Realm, he helps Seth become a true dragon tamer.
- Jinzen: A treasure dragon, the first guardian of the Dragon Temple at Titan Valley, he is a dragon of light, but is cruel and vicious in his pursuit and protection of his treasure hoard. Has some teleportation abilities.
- Jeruwat: A highly dangerous dragon who works for Celebrant as someone who is sent in as an assassin, he hunts down the Dragon Slayers, and Kendra, before he is killed by Gerwin, a dragon slayer.
- Luria is an amber colored dragon from Skyhold.
- Madrigus: A huge, thick scaled dragon who challenges Celebrant for the kingship, he fights with a rare breath weapon - Seething Night - but is savagely killed. Later, Tanu uses his parts to make powerful potions.
- Mobando: A thinner, green, snake-like dragon that attempted to stop Kendra and Seth on their mission at Wyrmroost and helps Ronodin conquer the fairy realm.
- Nafia: An enormous blue female dragon with a lightning breath weapon, she confronts Kendra and Seth, and almost eats them, but are saved by Gavin/Navarog who convinces Nafia to spare them. She appears to the team later in human form calling herself "Nyssa" offering assistance, but they decline her help. Agad reveals that she is a fairly dark dragon, and the mother of Chalize.
- Navarog: Known as the Demon Prince and lord among the dark dragons, Navarog is an enormous dragon, covered in oily black scales and spikes, and breathes fire like liquid gold. For centuries he had been confined in human form in the Quiet Box in the Fablehaven dungeon until the Sphinx released him. He set in motion the steps to destroy Fablehaven with the Shadow Plague in Book 3, and killed some members of the Knights of the Dawn in Book 4 before he was eaten by Raxtus while in human form. He does better in storms than most other dragons.
- Numrum: A fire-breathing dragon of Wyrmroost with a face full of squirming tentacles, he was one of the dragons sent by Celebrant to apprehend Kendra and Seth, but was defeated by the Somber Knight.
- Obregon: A fiercely loyal dragon to Celebrant and a member of his personal guard, he and Celebrant hunt for the Wizenstone together.
- Odenholm: He challenged Celebrant for the kingship, and lost.
- Pioleen: One of the guardians of Titan Valley's dragon temple, very small but very unpredictable and famously strong in magic, she creates elaborate illusions, manipulates solid rock, and other powerful feats during the attempt to access the temple.
- Ranticus preceded Chalize as the artifact guardian at Lost Mesa. He was known as one of the most powerful dragons in his time. He was fatally poisoned by Patton Burgess early in the 1900s. His bones were put on display at the Lost Mesa Museum and were later reanimated during the preserve's fall.
- Raxtus introduces himself as a fairy dragon to Kendra. He is much smaller than average, with gleaming silvery white scales. His "human" form is that of a foot-high male fairy with butterfly wings. He was raised by fairies, namely Shiara who currently resides at Fablehaven. He can turn invisible at will, and is an excellent flier. Unlike most dragons, he is shy and has low self esteem, but quickly befriends Kendra, but only after she is alone. Kendra's touch transfers magical energy to Raxtus. He helps her to the fairy shrine at Wyrmroost. In Book 5, he played a crucial role in battling the demons from Zzyzx. His breath helps things grow and heal, and his scales are nearly inpenetrable.
- Raina is a sleek, white dragon, the step-mother of Raxtus, and current mate of Celebrant. Fairly nice to her son.
- Rhondas: He challenged Celebrant for the kingship, and lost.
- Siletta is the last guardian of the Dragon Temple treasury. She resembles a giant salamander with at least 10 sets of legs, and is poison to the core. She has translucent skin, revealing veins and her colorful organs. Her breath poisons intruders, killing them quickly. Some have debated whether she ranks just below Celebrant in dangerous abilities, and could kill Thronis. She was killed by Kendra and Seth using a unicorn horn.
- Tamryn is Celebrant's son, almost as powerful as he is, who takes the form of a blond man. Although an heir apparent to the dragons, he is rather arrogant and boastful.
- Velrog: An evil dragon similar to an ankylosaur with spiderlike abilities, he serves as a dragon boogeyman and was allegedly raised underground. He is the final guardian of Titan Valley's dragon temple.

Drumants
Furry little creatures that resembles tarantulas with tails, they hop around and can distort light around them, making them difficult to catch. They are nocturnal, and their bites inflict a deadly poison. The drumants in Vanessa's collection still bite, but she bred them not to be venomous, thus rendering them nearly harmless.

Dread Wolves
Large 2-headed wolves, and occasionally 3-headed, they inhabit the dragon sanctuary Wyrmroost. Illusion spells are not effective on them due to their keen sense of smell.

Dryads
Wood Nymphs, who live in the forest and dress in flowing autumnal robes, they are beings of the forest as a whole, as opposed to hamadryads, who are linked to individual trees. Dryads are seen for the first time in Book 3 and are described as nimble, very tall (7 feet and up) and can run swiftly through the trees. They, including Lizette, and Rhea, helped in the battle between light and dark creatures. Dryads are the guardians of the Fairy Shrine at the Stony Vale preserve. In Dragonwatch, Kendra and Seth meet Eldenor in the Sentient Wood.

Dullion
A cruder form of their cousin the golem, made of less quality materials, and have no will of their own, they are usually made of natural materials and animated by a powerful spell. The only known one is made of hay and in the hands of the Society of the Evening Star. It is possible that Mendigo, a human sized, animated wooden puppet, might be considered a Dullion. In Dragonwatch Book 2, the Somber Knight uses Umbro, a dullion made out of tar in the shape of a giant bull, to defeat Chiro the dragon.

Dwarves
Short people who live underground and keep to themselves, these stalky little people first appear in Grip of the Shadow Plague, where they fled to the pond to avoid the plague. Some of them, wielding large hammers, also fight in the battle between light and dark creatures. A dark hooded dwarf is one of the creatures guarding the artifact in the inverted tower, but he does not make a physical appearance. In Book 4, a dwarf named Zogo introduced himself as the Giant's Dwarf. He rode a griffin, and with other griffins took the team to Thronis the sky giant. In book five a hooded dwarf named Tollin comes to Fablehaven when Vanessa's secret is revealed. He later betrays the Sorensons and friends to the Society. In Dragonwatch Obun and Didger are part of the staff at Blackwell Keep, and work in the stables. Three other dwarves are guards at the keep. A trickster dwarf called Humbuggle is responsible for the curse on Stormguard Castle.

Elves
'Tiny folk' that live in the Fairy Queen's realm, they escape through the shrine on Shoreless Isle during the battle against the demons of Zzyzx.

Fair Folk
A large community of incredibly beautiful, magical beings that resemble humans, except for the fact that they are all unnaturally attractive and slightly magical, they are introduced in Dragonwatch as nearly immortal, but strictly neutral. Seth and Kendra meet Dalgoral, the leader of the community in Wyrmroost, his son Garreth, and daughter Eve. Also, Good King Weldon was a former leader of the city Terrabelle. In Dragonwatch, Lomo helps Kendra and Seth in Stormguard Castle, which was apparently also inhabited by the fair folk, including King Hollorix, and his sons Heath, Tregain, and Lockland. There is a whole separate-dimension country of them in Poland called Selona.

Fairies
These magical creatures resemble tiny females with wings. They emit a gleaming light, and love their own reflection. The fairies are the first magical creatures Kendra and Seth see on the preserve, and are part of the whole story of Fablehaven more than any other magical creature. The Fairy Queen has a shrine on an island in the preserve, and makes Kendra fairykind, and one of her handmaidens. With instructions from the Fairy Queen, Kendra makes a potion that enlarges the fairies to human size. In their empowered state the fairies defeat Muriel the witch, and the demon Bahumat. In Book 2, a fairy named Shiara turns Mendigo to Kendra's will. Other names of fairies include Yolie, Larina, Ilyana. In the Dragonwatch series Tinori and Poza are introduced. Some of the varieties of fairy identified in the books are:
- Downy Fountain Sprite are blue fuzzy fairies from the island of Roti. One is purchased by the Sorensons from Maddox.
- Banda Sea Sunwings are fairies with colorful, stained glass butterfly wings.
- Jinn Harp are rare and beautiful fairy, and they have an amazing singing voice that mesmerizes all who hear it.
- Nightgrifts are albino fairies from Borneo with black speckled moth wings.
- Great Fairies are full sized fairies, and the most powerful, known as fairy godmothers. The Fairy Queen has historically been a Great Fairy. Kendra and Seth meet Risenmay in the Bewilderness who assists them in getting to Stormguard Castle during a festival night. They are powerful but occasionally petty.

Firedrake
Fire breathing flying reptiles that inhabit the Dragon Sanctuary, Wyrmroost, as listed by Agad, the caretaker, they are like giant writhing snakes with wings. One of them accompanies the Society of the Evening Star in an attempt to kill the last Eternal, Civia.

== G-J ==
Gargoyles
Gargoyles are large winged monsters. In Book 1, four of them were released with the demon Bahumat. They were quickly dispatched by the empowered fairy army. In Book 4, one attacks at the hotel, along with a goblin and a wolf-like creature. In Dragonwatch Book 2, a creature in the form of gargoyle tries to recruit Seth by promising to train his abilities, and in book 5 a grieving swarm of them help Seth escape Celebrant's cruel son, Tamryn.

Giants
There are a few different types of giants are mentioned in the books. They are:
- Fog Giants are the giants that live in the swampy areas of Fablehaven. They are described as powerful, brutal and blood thirsty, but also slightly dim-witted and slow. They are also highly territorial, and fiercely defend their borders. A Fog Giant named Burlox gave Coulter some vital information about where Warren had been before he became a catatonic albino, which led them to the location of the hidden artifact in Rise of the Evening Star.
- Hill Giants are the giants that inhabit Wyrmroost. They were engaged in a fight and 'accidentally' took out a bridge Kendra and Seth needed to return to the keep. One giant, probably a Hill Giant is Pugwig, who is a permanent resident of the dungeon at Terrabelle, by choice because he likes it there.
- Sky Giant: The team sent to retrieve the artifact key at the Dragon Sanctuary is captured by a Sky Giant named Thronis. He enjoys a civil and proud existence and is described as the largest giant in the world, several times larger than Fog Giants. He is cordial to the team of adventurers, though he does still threaten to make a pie out of them. In Champion of the Titan Games Seth and Merek are told about Stratos, the land of the Sky Giants, which used to float in the sky but sank down to Earth due to the destruction of the Ethergem.
- Snow Giant: Thronis obtained a figurine that can turn into a snow giant if placed in snow and summoned.
- Steppe Giant: Bracken mentions that Steppe Giants can be found on Living Mirage, possibly the ones Kendra described as 'burly armored nomads half the height of the surrounding trees'.

Gnomes
Gnomes are small, sometimes ornery fairy creatures. In Dragonwatch there is Karzal, the leader of the protected area of the Gnomes, at the feast of Welcome. He befriends Kendra and offers his support in the upcoming conflict, and tells them about the curse of Stormguard Castle.

Goblins
Goblins are generally evil creatures that can disguise themselves. Seth was tricked by goblins on Midsummer's Eve. The goblins were disguised as wolves attacking a crying baby. Seth opened the window and three goblins came into the house. Voorsh and Slaggo are the goblins who are in charge of upkeep in the dungeon. They said in Book 2 that they would only help Kendra and Seth escape if Grandpa gave them a goose.

Golem
A creature made out of natural materials and given life by a powerful spell, they are typically servants who always obey their master. The only golem shown in the series is Hugo. True golems have a will of their own, though they are loyal to their master. True golems were thought to be extinct, but Hugo, who had originally been a copy of a true golem, and had no will of his own, was destroyed by Muriel the witch, then re-created by the fairies. It appears that they restored him as a true golem, and he is developing his own will.

Griffin
A flying beast with the head, wings, and talons of an eagle, attached to the body and rear legs of a lion, they appear with the Sky Giant's dwarf and take them prisoner to the Giant. They attempt to rescue the team from a dragon ambush, and successfully bring Seth to Thronis. In Dragonwatch Book 1, Seth rides a griffin named Tempest to escape pursuing dragons. In Book 2 Sheba, Sage, and Titan transport the main characters to Skyhold.

Hag
An old woman, much like a witch, the Swamp Hag of Fablehaven resides in the great marsh of the preserve. Patton visited her in his time, and she is mentioned occasionally, though never seen in the storyline. Coulter mentioned that she made false paths through the bog to lure travelers to their doom. She is said to have trained Muriel in becoming a witch. In Dragonwatch, Lowly Vatka is a powerful Hag, and the leader of the Sludgeholes, a protected area of Wyrmroost inhabited by Witches and Hags.

Hamadryads
These are creatures related to dryads, but they are linked to a single tree. Ephira, a cursed Hamadryad, who is mentioned in the first three books, has a significant part in Grip of the Shadow Plague, as she was co-creator of the plague with the demon Kurisock.

Harpy
Shriveled hags with bird wings instead of arms, and talons instead of feet, their talons can inflict a deadly poisonous wound, though there is a readily available antidote. They attack Kendra, Warren, Bracken, and Raxtus while they tried to escape Living Mirage.

Hobgoblins
Hobgoblins are armored snakelike men. Dale, Tanu, and Coulter had to fight one guarding the artifact in the Inverted Tower of Rise of the Evening Star. In Grip of the Shadow Plague, several were guarding the black tree with the nail in the battle between light and dark creatures. In Dragonwatch, a hobgoblin described as a green-skinned goblin with froglike features is a staff member at Blackwell Keep.

Hydra
A monster with several dragon-like heads, and the first guardian of the Dragon Temple, the beast called herself Hespera. The hydra surfaces out of a pool as the team passes, blocking their exit from the Temple. It has no less than 15 heads, some wounded and scarred. They succeed in confusing some of the heads, revealing the governing head, which they attack. They successfully pass the hydra, but must confront it again to leave the Temple. Hespera was killed by Navarog, who was disguising himself as Gavin Rose.

Imps
Imps are fairies who have been captured and kept inside over night. They are also considered a Fallen Fairy. Seth caught a fairy and kept it in a jar overnight and it turned into an imp. At the end of Book 1, the fairies turned into life-size fairies and so did the imps. When the giant fairies kissed the imps, the imps were restored to their former fairy selves. In Rise of the Evening Star a large imp wrestles with Grandpa and breaks some of his bones, putting him in a wheelchair for most of the book. They also attempt to capture Kendra and Seth, but Mendigo stops them by breaking their arms and legs. The names of the imps released from the dungeon by Vanessa are Grixt, Huro, and Zurt. In Book 4, it is revealed that Imps originally rose from the fall of the Fairy King.

Jackalope
Jackalope are rabbits with antlers. In Book 3, they are found at the Lost Mesa preserve. Jackalopes are said to be lucky.

Jinn
Jinns are the evil beings from which the myth of Genies originated. Grandma tells the children about one they had imprisoned while giving them a tour of the dungeon. They are powerful enough to grant favors, but ever word uttered to one is binding. She explained that he was responsible for turning her into a chicken the previous year. Many live at Living Mirage.

== K-O ==
Karkadann
Karkadann are huge rhinoceros-like creatures that reside in Living Mirage. Kendra spots one being carried off by a Roc. Warren warns that it would be fatal if they encountered a karkadann.

Kobolds
Kobolds are evil animals, related to goblins. Kendra saw one in Rise of the Evening Star. His name was Casey Hancock and appeared as a strikingly handsome boy. Only Kendra could see him as an ugly Kobold. He had a bald head, rancid breath, and wooed some of Kendra friends out on dates.

Lamassu
Enormous winged bulls with a man's head, they are creatures of light, and Kendra, Warren and Bracken must pass one called Halad to escape the dungeon. They live at Living Mirage and are called upon by the Fairy Queen to battle the demons that have escaped from Zyzyx.

Lectoblix
See Blixes.

Leprechaun
The Journal of Secrets explains that there is a magical pond somewhere on Fablehaven where a treasure hunter can capture a Leprechaun. In Book 5, Seth must catch a leprechaun named Cormac to retrieve items Patton Burgess left with him.

Leviathan
A Leviathan is one of the figurines that Thronis, the sky giant asks Seth to receive for him from the Dragon Temple. Once placed in water, the figure will turn into a real Leviathan and be obedient to the one who placed it there. Seth travels to Titan Valley in this way. Leviathans are very large whale-like creatures that move swiftly despite their size.

Lich
Liches are a type of undead creature that retain some of their formal human will, making them more powerful and dangerous. They are said to reside in the Grim Marsh on Fablehaven. They have no connection to "Mr. Lich", the Sphinx's right-hand man and a viviblix. In Dragonwatch, Seth confronts a whole room full of Liches. When one touches him the contact caused searing pain. Seth meets a Lich named Belrab, a former Wizard imprisoned in the Blackwell. Seth also argues for permission to enter the Under Realm Dungeon with a Lich dungeon-keeper named Ezabar.

Luvians
Luvians are intelligent breed of horse that can read and speak. Mute Luvians are donated to Blackwell Keep to perpetuate the speaking ability among the Luvian community. Two of these Mute Luvians, Noble and Glory, are chosen by Kendra and Seth to take them to parts of Wyrmroost.

Lycanthrope
Essentially a werewolf, two of them are included in the ambush at Obsidian Waste.

Manticore
A lion with a man's head and a scorpion tail, they are known to reside at the Living Mirage preserve.

Milch Cow
Every magical preserve has one of these amazing animals, which in everything but size, appear like normal animals, but they are enormous. They are magical beings that create the milk the fairies drink. It is this milk that allows mortals to see magical creatures. The milch cow at Fablehaven is called Viola and was already 100 years old when she was brought to Fablehaven. The Lost Mesa magical preserve has a similar but larger cow called Mazy. On a magical preserve in Greenland, they have a gigantic walrus that produces butter that has the same effect as the milk. The skull of one is in the Lost Mesa museum, showing their skulls can grow to the size of a motor home.

Minotaur
A creature that is part man, part bull, they make appearances in all of the books. In Book 1, it is one of the creatures released with Bahumat. In Book 2, Warren fights one who is placed to guard the way to the artifact in the inverted tower. In Book 3, several are stationed to guard Kurisock's domain at the battle between light and dark creatures. In Book 5, some come with Torina Barker, a firedrake, Mirav and some gargoyles to kill Civia, last of the Eternals. In Book 4, a minotaur Brunwin is one of Agad's servants at Blackwell Keep. He also appears in Dragonwatch, along with Romnus and Tonak. Brunwin ends up befriending Seth and helping him secure Blackwell Keep.

Moss People
A shy folk at Wyrmroost who are only seen hiding among the trees.

Necromancer
Patton Burgess mentioned to Seth that he needed the use of a Necromancer to secure passage with the entity in the captain's cabin of the Lady Luck to Shoreless Isle. As Seth is a Shadow Charmer, he serves as a Necromancer.

Naiads
Water Nymphs are the beings that live underwater who live a life of mirth and frivolity. They dwell in the pond surrounding the Fairy Queen's Island Shrine. The naiads love to make fun of anyone else, and drown humans for fun. Lena, the housekeeper, is a former naiad who became mortal when she joined Patton Burgess and became his wife. She was later restored as a naiad at the end of Book 1. Some names of naiads in the series are: Chiatra, Narinda, Ulline, Hyree, Pina, Zolie, Frindle, and Jayka.

Narcoblix
See Blixes.

Nipsies
Nipsies are related to brownies, but are only a quarter inch tall. They live in seven kingdoms and build their cities using natural resources. They have little magical ability, but they adept at cultivating poisonous plants to protect their domain. They are the first creatures affected by the shadow plague. In Dragonwatch, one of the main characters who aid Seth and Kendra with their mission is Calvin, who aided Kendra and Seth with their primary mission.

Nymphs
Immortal beings in human female form, the types of Nymphs found in Fablehaven are Dryads, Hamadryads, and Naiads.

Octobear
One of the evil creatures released with the Demon Bahumat, it resembles an animal that is part bear with several tentacles like an octopus.

Ogres
Typically big and clumsy, though smaller than giants, they are known for devouring their victims. A female Ogre, or Ogress, chases Seth and Kendra when they're caught stealing stew from her pot in Book 1. Kendra glimpses a humpback Ogre in Blackwell Keep in Book 4. In Dragonwatch, Seth is chased by Mung back to his yard after he tried to steal treasure from the ogre's territory.

== P-S ==
Peryton
Peryton are flying golden deer with fangs, sharp hooves and poisonous antlers. The team are accosted by a herd of perytons fleeing a dragon. One gores Warren which seriously injures him.

Phantom
Vanessa expected the creature inhabiting the grove around the inverted tower was a phantom. She explained in Book 5 that phantoms are ghostly ethereal beings. In Dragonwatch, Phantoms are born from a significant tragedy, who then develop an independent identity. Seth must confront a phantom named Dezia on Crescent Lagoon to obtain a magic flower.

Phoenix
Phoenix is a powerful creature that inhabits the Dragon Sanctuary, Wyrmroost. In Book 5, Torina uses phoenix feather arrows against the Eternals to kill them. Along with dragon breath and unicorn horns, this is the only thing that can reliably kill them. Phoenixes also are called upon by the Fairy Queen to help fight the demons that escaped from Zzyxx.

Pixie
Pixies are a type of fairy that are briefly mentioned in Book 1. In Book 2, Coulter describes a type of Pixie that lives in Norway that shed their wings at the onset of winter. They make a cocoon to protect them and emerge from them in the spring with a new set of wings. Coulter explains to Kendra and Seth that their cocoons can envelope a person in an impervious shell. It is this shell that eventually saves Seth from being devoured by Olloch the Glutton.

Rainbow Serpent
A magical being native to Australia who is described as "one of our most reverenced benefactors, an entity of tremendous creative power", it is probably connected to the Fairy Queen, since the Rainbow River, a pure stream that is a gift from it, flows near the Fary Queen shrine at Obsidian Waste.

Revenant
A Revenant is essentially a reanimated corpse that are under an enchantment. The Revenant in Book 2 was a guard over the vault where the magical artifact was hidden. He radiated powerful magical fear and turned victims albino, mute, and catatonic. Warren was introduced like this, though his condition was a mystery at the time. The Revenant was defeated when Seth pulled the cursed nail from its neck after downing some pure liquid courage he took from Tanu. In Dragonwatch, Revenants have a small human life-spark, but it is buried so deep that their intent focus makes them more powerful, but allows them to barely function physically. There are some Revenants imprisoned in the Blackwell.

Roc
Powerful and dangerous creature that inhabits the Dragon Sanctuary, Wyrmroost, they also inhabit Living Mirage. Sometimes called a Simurgh, rocs are gigantic birds that attack Kendra, Warren, and Bracken while they ride upon Raxtus. They are large enough to carry a karkadann, but prefer to align with light over darkness.

Rumitaur
Rumitaur is described in Dragonwatch as men with bodies of elk. Amulon is the tauran leader at Wyrmroost, and has antlers on his human head.

Satyrs
Satyrs are part goat, part human creatures. They live fun and frivolous lives. Two Satyrs, Newel and Doren, play significant roles in Fablehaven. They make parties more exciting, play tennis, and trade gold to Seth for batteries to power their portable TV. Kendra and Seth are introduced to Verl in Book 3, who Seth figures out was the satyr equivalent of a nerd. Rondus is the name of another satyr revealed during a game of tackle tag. Virgil is a satyr who studies Humbuggle's games, and sees the dwarf as a hero, but is a valuable companion to Seth and later Kendra.

Sea Serpent
Sea Serpents are mentioned in Book 3 by Warren, and later in book 3 of Dragonwatch. They are huge serpents who breathe air or water and can be some of the largest creatures in the world. They inhabit Crescent Lagoon and may be sentient.

Shape-shifter
Creatures that can take the form of any animal and are gifted with speech, they are charged with the protection of the Eternals. Niko is the main protector and Kendra meets him when they look for the Eternal, Roon. Others who guarded the other Eternals were Tux and Janan, as well as two unnamed others, one that favored the shape of an exotic bird.

Shade
Shade is an undead being that Vanessa says is an ethereal being. Seth threatens Nero with a shade in Book 5.

Sirrush
A scaly flying dogs, Kendra, Warren, and Bracken encounter them at Living Mirage.

Skin-walker
Skinwalkers are humans that have the ability to shape shift into an animal, comparable to an Animagus in the Harry Potter series. At Lost Mesa preserve, Neil revealed himself as a skinwalker and turned into a stallion to save Kendra's and others lives.

Skeleton
Skeletons are reanimated undead with only bones left. In Dragonwatch Book 2, a skeleton rows Kendra across an underground body of water beneath Stormguard Castle, much like Charon of Greek Mythology.

Specter
Explained to be an ethereal, ghostly being in Book 5.

Sphinx
Actual sphinxes are mentioned as one of the creatures in Living Mirage. A sphinx guards the entrance to the Sealed Shrine and ask each person who wishes to enter a riddle.

Sprites
Related to Fairies, Vanessa tells Kendra of the Umite Sprites that dwell in hive-like communities in rain forests around the world. They make honey and wax like bees. The candle and crayon Vanessa gives Kendra is made of Umite wax.

Stingbulb
These creatures actually start out as a fruit growing on a Stingbulb tree, which grow in Eastern Turkey. The tree only produces a few a year. When touched, they obtain a tissue or blood sample, which is where the sting comes from. Then it takes them about 90 minutes to grow into a replica of that person. This copy only lives for 3 to 4 days after completing the metamorphosis. It keeps much of the memories of the person it is impersonating. It obeys its initial instructions to perform some mission before it dies. In Book 4, Kendra is kidnapped and replaced by a stingbulb impostor who attempts to pass secrets to the Society of the Evening Star. She creates another stingbulb to escape, who currently resides in the quiet box so she can live longer and be useful for other purposes.

== T-Z ==
Thylacine
Thylacines, also known as Tasmanian tigers, are magical creatures on the Obsidian Waste preserve. They are considered extinct elsewhere and some are gifted with speech.

Triclops
A skeleton of a Mesopotamian triclops is mentioned at the museum on the Lost Mesa.

Thunderbirds
A giant bird, big enough to carry a human, Patton Burgess mentioned that he used one, or one very similar to a Thunderbird, to escape from Shoreless Isle.

Trolls
Trolls are unfriendly, greedy scavengers that will typically live in forests, by rivers, in caves or underground. Some are lizard-like in appearance, burly and shorter than the average man. Others are huge and brutish. There are several types of Trolls mentioned in the books. They are:
- Cliff Troll: These typically live in the sides of ravines. Nero is a black scaley Cliff Troll with a huge hoard of treasures. With the use of a seeing stone, he helps to locate Grandpa Sorenson after he was kidnapped. He helps Seth learn how to be a shadewalker. Another troll is Sarrok, mentioned to be good with jewels.
- Gate Troll, also known as Bully Trolls, one named Grimp has claimed a bridge in Wyrmroost and gives Kendra and Seth a hard time as they try to cross it.
- Hermit Troll are the smallest trolls, who love seclusion. Bubda is discovered hiding in the knapsack, and ends up accompanying the team searching for the key at Wyrmroost.
- Mountain Troll: Seth befriends a Mountain Troll named Udnar who helps him obtain the unicorn horn, or "Soul of Grunhold". He is huge, with large sword like spikes over his body. Some are known to inhabit Wyrmroost.
- Ridge Troll is one of the members of the staff at Blackwell Keep. Grippa is in charge of the armory and Seth negotiates for the weapons in there with him.
- River Troll: They are said to live at Living Mirage, and several aid the Singing Sisters on the Mississippi River, two of which are named Gromlet, and Tibbut.

Undead
Many varieties of undead creatures haunt the books, from the first zombies Seth and Kendra get to feed at Lost Mesa, to the Underking in the Dragonwatch book, who Kendra and Seth both have dealings with. It is even speculated that Ryland, the Somber Knight, is thought to be undead. Throughout the books there are two different types of undead:
Corporeal:
- Liches
- Revenants
- Skeletons
- Wights
- Zombies
and Ethereal:
- Apparitions
- Phantoms
- Shades
- Specters
- Wraiths

Unicorn
White horses with spiraling horns on their foreheads, Unicorns are exceptionally rare and some considered them extinct. They represent purity, and their horns purify. In Book 4, a unicorn horn must be obtained from the centaurs of Grunhold in order to open the gates of Wyrmroost. They do not make an appearance, however, until Book 5 where they can assume human form, like dragons. Bracken is a unicorn in human form and a prisoner in the Living Mirage dungeon. There he meets Kendra who escapes with him with the assignment to save the eternals. Unicorns are the founders of fairydom. Ronodin is mentioned in the Fablehaven series to be a dark unicorn who willfully corrupted his horns. His role as an active antagonist is revealed in the Dragonwatch series. Other revealed Unicorns include Mizelle/Lizelle, Bracken's sister (who is referred to by two different names), and their father, the Fairy King, whom Seth meets in Dragonwatch.

Viviblix
See Blixes.

Werebear
A man who can transform into a bear-like beast, a werebear helps the Sphinx escape at the end of Grip of the Shadow Plague.

Wereboar, Wearwolf, Wearlynx
Inhabitants of Wyrmroost, most of which have succumbed to their wilder nature.

Whisper Hound
A wraith-like enchantment that guards the dungeons of Fablehaven and Living Mirage, it becomes ferocious when prisoners try to escape. It is technically not a living creature as it is created by magic.

Wight
An undead creature Vanessa says is a corporeal creature.

Witches
These are mortal females who have turned to evil and dark magic. Muriel, the witch who was responsible for freeing the demon Bahumat, and was imprisoned with him at the end of Book 1. In Book 5, the Singing Sisters, Orna, Berna, and Wilna, help Seth know where to go to find Vasalis.

Wizards/Warlocks
They are dragons who became mortals to gain powerful magical abilities. In Book 3, a fellow Knight of the Dawn tells Kendra of a Warlock who has the ability to create dullions. Further in the book, Warren explains to Kendra that powerful wizards used to be the only ones who could successfully contend with dragons. Agad, in Book 4, reveals himself to Kendra as a wizard, and explains that all wizards were dragons who have chosen to permanently remain in their human forms. Archadius was the first wizard who discovered that his magical abilities were greatly focused in human form. Morisant was the chief architect of Zzyzx, but turned himself into one of the undead to prolong his life. He freely gave the sword to Seth on the condition that Seth would slay him. Mirav was an old evil wizard from India working for the Society. Egar and Vernaz are wizards mentioned in Dragonwatch.

Wizard's Slime
An orange creature resembling living pudding, it is effective in extracting poison from infected tissue.

Woodlings
Woodlings are living wooden creatures created from trees of the Sentient Wood. Yimo, described as a carved wooden creature with a stalky body but with very long thin legs, guided the team safely to the Bewilderness.

Wraith
Wraith is a ghostlike apparition that exudes magical fear. In Book 4, Grandpa Sorenson discusses with Seth the wraiths imprisoned in the Hall of Dread. He also threatens the Maddox impostor with a close encounter with a wraith. Seth employs three wraiths to guard certain places of the preserve after Fablehaven falls. In Dragonwatch, Seth brings a wraith, whom he called Whiner, to serve the Singing Sisters. In Dragonwatch wraiths are created by powerful beings out of souls that yearn for something, and then withhold it from them. Using magic and that desperate longing, they can be transformed into a wraith. The spell can be undone if the wraith is ever given that which they most desire.

Wyverns
Powerful and dangerous creatures (like many of its neighbors) that inhabit the Dragon Sanctuary, Wyrmroost, as listed by Agad, they resemble dragons with wolfish heads and two feet. They are used by the Society of the Evening Star to attack the Eternals in Book 5.

Yowie
Yowies are tall, ape-like creatures on the Obsidian Waste preserve in Australia. They are extremely shy but curious and have a forlorn song.

Zombies
Zombies are corpses that have been re-animated. In Book 3, Hal introduces Kendra and Gavin to a graveyard full of buried zombies. He feeds them through tubes in the ground to keep them from eating people. Later, the zombies escape their graves and help to destroy of the preserve Lost Mesa. In the Obsidian Waste preserve, Mr. Lich controls an army of them and sets a trap for the Knights of the Dawn.

Zowali Protectorate
This is the protected realm within Wyrmroost of the talking animals. Their current leader is Raj Feranna, a talking Bengal tiger. Known inhabitants include:
- Raj Feranna is a tiger, current leader of the Zowali Protectorate.
- Crea is a golden eagle. She attends the dragon's feast of welcome and befriends Kendra and Seth. She also helps them escape the dungeon on Terrabelle.
- Gorban is a bear who meets Kendra at the border and helps her to Shelter, the main meeting area.
- Crea is a fox who assists in bringing Kendra to Shelter.
- Luvians are the species of talking horse, including Captain, Rodolfo, and Charlemagne, and the mute Luvians Noble and Glory all of whom accompanied Kendra and Seth to Stormguard Castle, and Mickette, a Luvian Pegasus.
- Azalar - owl
- Ramboogua - baboon
- Tasha - chimpanzee
- Babak is a camel who accompanied Kendra and Seth's team to Stormguard Castle in Dragonwatch Book 2.
- Thistleton is a rabbit who accompanied Kendra and Seth's team to Stormguard Castle.
- Samba - boomslang or Snake.
- Hinto the Great is an elephant who was a former leader of the Zowali Protectorate.

== Other creatures ==
Several other magical creatures are described throughout the books. The books do not identify them by name or species, but they are worth mentioning here. They are categorized here by location or time seen. More creatures are seen at these locations, but if they are identified, they will be listed above.

Midsummer Eve
- 12 foot flying centipede with six wings, and six taloned feet
- brutish monster with a pronounced underbite and plates down its spine

Released with Bahumat
- toadlike monstrosity
- scabby beast with a white mane
- demonic dwarf with a hide of black scales
- greasy creature that looked like a turtle without a shell, and coughed globs of slime, possibly a Bunyip

Vanessa's collection
- colorful lizard with three eyes that can see slightly into the future, possibly the Tuatara
- hairless mouse that turned into a fish if dropped in water
- bat that shed its wings biweekly. The shed wings can be attached to other animals.

In the dungeon
- wolf-like creature
- birdman with the head of a seagull

Inverted tower
- blue woman with six arms and the body of a serpent, possibly Maralith
- dark man who was human from the waist up and a spider from the waist down (possibly Anansi)

Artifact guardians
- Fablehaven is a black monster cat with 9 lives. The cat started out as a simple black cat—friendly at first—until Warren removed the key hanging around its neck. Then it became fierce but easy to kill. The dead cat melted and reformed into a larger, meaner feline. Each incarnation is larger than the previous, more vicious, and more difficult to kill. The second life is just a larger version of the first incarnation. The third had tufted ears and was similar to a lynx but just as big and with disproportionately large paws and claws. The fourth life was a larger, beefed up version of the lynx, both quicker and nastier. For the fifth life the cat resembled a panther – more patient and deadly. The sixth life was as big as a tiger. During the seventh life the cat became more deformed. It was as tall as a horse with dagger claws and saber-tooth fangs. It also had four writhing serpents growing out of its shoulders. The eighth life was much larger than a horse, had no snakes, but two heads that spit a sludge-like acid. For the ninth and final life, the cat was truly a monster. It was enormous, with large wings, and twelve serpents coming out of its shoulders. It had three tails and three heads, that spit acid like the eighth, but more. It took a giant-sized Tanu to defeat the final life of this nine-lived guardian monster.
- Lost Mesa: Patton Burgess described it as a troop of ghostly knights, and that it was a battle he would rather forget. Tammy also mentioned a beast that was covered with so many knives. They looked like feathers, and it could be Achiyalatopa.

Lost Mesa

Neil described them as "Kachinas" and other kindred spirits.

- lean, shaggy man with the head of a coyote, possibly Akba-atatdia, or Old Man Coyote
- 8 ft. tall bear chested oaf, with a face like a mask, perhaps Tó Neinilii
- tall feathery being with the head of a hawk
- leering humpback man with a long flute, perhaps Kokopelli
- body of a human female, head of a bobcat
- gigantic bronze scorpion
- broad, lumpy man with a towering forehead and deformed face
- large creature with at least 10 legs, which rippled when it moved

Lost Mesa Museum
- titanic humanoid skeleton with curved fangs, possibly a Nephilim
- serpentine creature with four arms, similar to Simrin at Blackwell Keep
- beast with large golden antlers, possibly the Ceryneian Hind (only the antlers were on display)

Refugees at the pond
- shaggy monkey-like creatures with extra arms and legs

Hotel
- an enormous wolf the size of a horse attacked, possibly Fenrir

Blackwell Keep
- a thin, hairless woman with four arms and skin like a snake who could climb up walls. It is not known what she is, but her name is Simrin, possibly a Dracaenae.
- a small man springing around on slender legs like a grasshopper

Wyrmroost
- a huge shaggy bear-like creature with a beak like a hawk. Kendra calls it a Hawkbear.
- a giant scorpion, with a tail taller than Kendra and Seth, threatens them as it attempts to steal dragon eggs

Roon's Hideout
- a boar the size of a hippo was snooping around the ruins of Roon's stronghold, possibly an Erymanthian or a Calydonian boar

Lady Luck
- an unidentified presence controlled the ship The Lady Luck. Seth observed it to have a girlish voice, and the appearance of a cloud of dust motes in the shape of a woman with long hair. She threatened to turn Seth into an undead sailor, until Seth, with the aid of Vasilis, convinced her to safely sail them to Shoreless Isle.
