= List of Fablehaven characters =

This is a list of characters in the Fablehaven fantasy novel series by Brandon Mull.

== Book 1 - Fablehaven ==
The stories of the Fablehaven series are revealed through the personal experience of Kendra and Seth Sorenson, who are the main characters of the novels.

=== Major characters ===
Kendra Sorenson
Kendra Sorenson is a typical 14-year-old girl, who is not enthusiastic to go on a mandatory vacation to her grandparents place, while her parents are on a 17-day cruise. She later becomes immersed in a whole new world full of fairies and other mystical creatures, called Fablehaven, the magical preserve where her grandparents oversee. She is described as a good student who rarely takes risks, overly cautious and far from the adventurer and rule breaker that her brother is. When she is in Fablehaven, it doesn't take long for trouble to find her, as the evil witch Muriel Taggert releases a powerful demon named Bahumat. The situation becomes desperate when everyone but her is captured and she must risk her own life to seek the Fairy Queen for help. As a result of her heart-felt supplication to the Fairy Queen, she becomes fairykind, a status which gives her certain magical abilities to aid her in her subsequent adventures.

Seth Sorenson
Seth Sorenson is Kendra's younger brother, who starts the series at age 11. He has a much more outgoing, risky, curious, and adventurous personality. Seth has great courage, but he has little patience, and he doesn't always think things through. Because of this, he tends to be the source of mischief as the story continues, most often trading batteries with the satyrs Newel and Doren. After learning many lessons the hard way, he eventually becomes more responsible and succeeds in overcoming many obstacles. His efforts against dark forces eventually mark him with the powers of a shadow charmer that, like his sister with her fairykind abilities, he is able to use through the series to successfully complete nearly impossible tasks.

Stan Sorenson
Stan Sorenson is Kendra and Seth's grandfather on their father's side. He and his wife Ruth have not been a large part of the lives of their grandchildren until the events of Fablehaven. He is the caretaker of Fablehaven. Grandpa Sorenson leaves clues about the true nature of the preserve, in hopes that Kendra and Seth will discover the truth that it is a preserve for magical creatures. He is a strict rule enforcer, though Seth still finds ways to get around them. He lives on Fablehaven with his wife knowing that it is dangerous, but he is capable. In the first book he is captured by a witch who is endeavoring to free a demon named Bahumat.

Ruth Sorenson
Ruth Sorenson is Stan's wife, and Kendra and Seth's grandmother. She used to teach college history, and is an expert masseuse. She is missing from the first part of book one, and Stan explains that she is away visiting a relative. She turns out to be the pet chicken living in the house named "Goldilocks". When Kendra and Seth discover the chicken is their grandmother, they seek the witch's help to change her back. After she is restored, she explained later that she had previously lost a confrontation with a Jinn, who turned her into the chicken. Ruth leads the assault on Muriel at the Forgotten Chapel, in hopes to stop her attempts to free Bahumat and release Stan and Lena. She fails, then is captured leaving Kendra alone to save them.

Dale Burgess
Dale is the grounds keeper at Fablehaven. He is a quiet, reserved man who helps Stan Sorenson out with chores and general upkeep of the preserve. Kendra spotted him giving the magical milk to the fairies, and he attempts to mislead her into believing it was not for human consumption. It is revealed that one of the biggest reasons he is staying at the preserve is to take care of his catatonic brother, Warren. Dale is second cousin to Stan Sorensen. He plays only minor, but helpful roles in subsequent books.

Lena Burgess
Lena was introduced to Kendra and Seth as the elderly housekeeper to Grandpa and Grandma Sorenson. She was revealed after Kendra and Seth learn the truth about Fablehaven, as a former Naiad who was married to Patton Burgess, a former caretaker of Fablehaven. She was captured by Muriel and Bahumat in the first book, and was unwillingly restored as a Naiad and returned to the pond by the fairy army by the end of the book. In the second book, Kendra goes to see if Lena will return, but the other Naiads take Lena away. In the third book, the appearance of Patton Burgess, by means of a powerful time-travel artifact, coaxes Lena from the pond, though it ultimately results in her death when they enter their final confrontation to save the preserve.

Maddox Fisk
Maddox Fisk, a grizzly looking mountain man, is one of Grandpa's friends and a fairy broker, which means that he catches and sells or trades fairies. He presents to the Sorensons his collection of fairies that he had gathered from around the world. In book 2 it is mentioned that Maddox went on a mission to the secret preserve in Brazil but contact with him was lost. Rescue attempts were made, but unsuccessful.

Hugo
Hugo is a golem, a manufactured being made of soil, rocks, and clay, animated by a powerful spell and given rudimentary intelligence. He has no will of his own and will do whatever he is told, but he was destroyed in the battle against Muriel and Bahumat. After the battle, the empowered fairies rebuilt him, turning him into a true golem and giving him a spark of free will. Hugo is very strong, about 10 feet tall, and has the general appearance of a large ape made of dirt and rocks with disproportionately larger hands and feet. He is a powerful ally throughout the entire series.

Newel and Doren
Newel and Doren are the satyrs. They are introduced in the series as Kendra and Seth are inadvertently stealing stew from an ogress. The satyrs are light hearted and fun, but they can be conniving. They tell Seth that if he brings them the batteries so that they can watch their portable television they will give him gold. Seth does bring them batteries and they give him gold which they have stolen from the troll, Nero, and later from the nipsies. The satyrs enjoy chasing hamadryads, and playing tennis, and are sometimes invited to parties inside the house. They are described as the "ultimate fair weather friends" and detest work.

Muriel Taggert
Muriel is the first villain of the Fablehaven series. She used to be the wife of a previous caretaker, but she became enamored with dark magic and witchcraft. For her crimes she was imprisoned in a shack on the grounds of Fablehaven, held from using magic by a rope with thirteen magical knots tied in it. The knots could only be undone by a human who asked for a favor of their own free will. The person would blow on a knot and Muriel would use the magical power released by unraveling the knot to grant the person a favor. She was freed by Kendra and Seth when she used the power of the final knot to transform Grandma Sorenson from a chicken to her human self. She then attempts to free the demon Bahumat and overthrow the preserve.

Mendigo
Mendigo is a wooden puppet held together with metal hooks at the joints. He used to be a small toy that Muriel the witch created to keep her company and she called him a limberjack. When she was freed she used a spell to make him human size and gave him golem like intelligence. He follows any order given by his master. He initially followed orders from Muriel, until fairies turned his will to take orders from Kendra. From this point on he becomes a strong ally. He is quite a bit stronger than he looks, and he can carry two people at once while running.

The Fairy Queen
The Fairy Queen introduces herself not as "a fairy" but as "the fairy" the mother, the eldest sister, though in fact she is not a fairy at all but a unicorn. She does not dwell on Earth, but in a different realm where she cannot be tainted by dark magic. Her only portals to the human world is through her shrines located on some of the magical preserves. The fairy queen shrine at Fablehaven is located in a beautiful park, on an island in the middle of a naiad pond. Unworthy visitors are instantly obliterated, as goes the story of a grounds keeper who was turned into dandelion fluff. Kendra, however, must visit the Fairy Queen for help to save her family, and Fablehaven from Muriel and Bahumat. The Fairy Queen spares her life and through the experience, makes her fairykind, giving her many of the powers of the fairies. With her help Kendra and the empowered fairy army defeat Muriel and Bahumat.

Bahumat
Bahumat is an ancient demon who plagued the Fablehaven area before the preserve was founded. Some Europeans imprisoned him in exchange for ownership of the land that he had terrorized. Fablehaven was founded on this land. He is bound by knots similar to those that bound Muriel, but in greater multitude. He was never bound by the treaty of Fablehaven, and therefore Bahumat has to overthrow the treaty to escape Fablehaven. Bahumat is not seen until the end of the first book as Muriel is trying to release him. She succeeds, but the fairies prevail in the end and imprison him underground.

Nero
Nero is a greedy cliff troll whom Ruth, Kendra and Seth visit to obtain information on where Stan is being held. He is a black, scaly, reptilian humanoid with yellow markings who owns a seeing stone. Nero, a tough bargainer, requests a large amount of treasure, but Ruth convinces him to accept a full body massage instead for the information.

=== Minor characters ===
Scott Michael Sorenson & Marla Kate Sorenson
Scott Michael Sorenson and Marla Kate Sorenson are Kendra and Seth's parents. They have only minor roles in this book, as they are oblivious to the magical world their children have been thrust into.

== Book 2 - Fablehaven: Rise of the Evening Star ==
The Society of the Evening Star, an arcane organization, is bent on freeing all captive magical creatures, even the dark ones. Also introduced are The Knights of the Dawn, a secret organization set to combat the evil efforts of the Society of the Evening Star.

=== Major characters ===
Errol Fisk (aka Christopher Vogel)
Christopher Vogel is an agent of the Society of the Evening Star. He met Kendra and Seth outside their school using the name Errol Fisk. He impressed them with his magician's skills, and told them he was sent by Coulter Dixon to get rid of the kobold Case. He convinced Seth to break into a mortuary to get a frog shaped statue, who turned out to be the demon named Olloch the Glutton. He tried to convince Kendra and Seth to accompany him on another mission, but they were warned by Grandpa Sorenson that he was not a friend, and likely a member of the Society of the Evening Star, which he actually turned out to be. He was a boyfriend to Vanessa in book two while the duo were working for the Society.

Vanessa Santoro
Vanessa is a friend of the Sorensons, with a strikingly beautiful appearance, and a fancy souped up sports car. She first appears at Kendra and Seth's home. She has been sent to pick them up and take them to Fablehaven, escaping Errol Fisk, alias Christopher Vogel. She is presented as a keeper of magical creatures. She is a Knight of the Dawn, and helps fellow knights Coulter and Tanu with their efforts to find the secret artifact hidden at Fablehaven, until she is revealed as a narcoblix and traitor. Her abilities give her power to control others while they are sleeping after she bites them. She had been secretly working for the Society of the Evening Star for a while by the time she was revealed. Once her plan is thwarted she was imprisoned in the Quiet Box, but leaves a message with Kendra revealing the Sphinx as a traitor. She is hoping to be released from confinement, expressing her desire to switch sides and help them defeat the Sphinx.

Tanugatoa "Tanu" Dufu
"Tanu", as people call him, is a large Samoan who is introduced to Kendra and Seth as an expert on potions. Warren calls him a "Potions Master". He is a Knight of the Dawn, and was brought in to help recover the artifact from Fablehaven. He gave Seth a mild fear potion and Kendra a mix of embarrassment and shame potion when he was introducing them to his work. He proves to be a skilled adventurer, healer, and in some cases, fighter. His potions come in handy throughout the series.

Warren Burgess
Warren is only slightly mentioned in the first book. He appears for the first time in the second book, but as a catatonic albino living in a cabin. No one could explain Warren's condition, or how he got like that, though efforts were made to restore him. His brother Dale cared for him for almost two years before he emerged from his catatonic state, which happened when Seth defeated the revenant in the second book. He is a member of the Knights of Dawn and was on a mission to find the treasure of the Fablehaven preserve before he was turned catonic/albino. At the end of Book 2, and throughout the rest of the series Warren proves himself to be an experienced adventurer and key player.

Coulter Dixon
Stan Sorenson describes Coulter Dixon as one of his oldest friends, and one of the most stubborn men he knows. Coulter is introduced to Kendra and Seth as an expert on magical items, relics and talismans. He is a Knight of the Dawn, and is brought onto the preserve along with Tanu and Vanessa to help recover the secret artifact. He teaches Kendra and Seth about some of the magical items in his possession, including a magical glove that renders the wearer invisible, how a distractor spell works, and a magic cocoon that allows the occupant to survive any environment. He and Kendra have a feud because he believes that there are some places that it is ok for a male to go but not for a female, which he calls "an outdated sense of chivalry".

Mr. Lich
Mr. Lich is a Sphinx's bodyguard and the man who Seth and Kendra follow to their first meeting with the Sphinx. After the Sphinx's betrayal, Mr. Lich is found to be a powerful viviblix capable of reanimating the dead.

The Sphinx
Kendra and Seth were introduced to the Sphinx in the second book. He was well received in the magical community as the most trusted and wise ally. He is described as a black man with short beaded dreadlocks. The Sphinx is the one who tells Kendra she is fairykind, and offers to help her develop her new abilities. He has been a leader for the cause for several hundred years, until suspicions arise when Vanessa reveals that he is a traitor. It is discovered that his ultimate quest is to obtain all the keys to the demon prison - Zzyzx, becoming the greatest enemy of the Knights of the Dawn. The Fairy Queen tells Kendra that he is a man and not another being in disguise, and attributes his age to magical tampering.

=== Significant magical creatures ===
Casey "Case" Hancock
Casey Hancock, who introduces himself as "Case" is a goblin-like creature called a kobold. He appears in Kendra's class at school, but only she can see him for what he really is. Everyone else sees him as a blond haired, handsome boy. As Kendra's friends swoon over his good looks, he asks them out on a movie date. He even goes as far as kissing some of her friends, revealing a major case of bad breath, causing them to avoid him. Errol Fisk helps Kendra and Seth get rid of the kobold by having Seth steal a statue that he says is sacred to kobolds. Supposedly, when Case received the statue, he immediately left, under a compulsion to return it to a kobold shrine in the Himalayan Mountains.

Olloch the Glutton
Olloch the Glutton is a demon who spends most of his time in a state of dormancy. While dormant he appears to be a statue of a frog. Seth is tricked into feeding the statue, thereby awakening the demon. The statue bites Seth, marking him as the target of the demon. The demon slowly comes to life and begins an unrelenting quest to find and devour Seth. He eats along the way, and as he eats he grows in size and power. He manages to breach the barriers of Fablehaven, and eventually succeeds in hunting down Seth, but Seth is protected by the fairy cocoon given to him by Coulter. Olloch consumes the cocoon, but Seth passes through the demon's digestive system and is expelled at the other end safely. This satisfies the demon's quest, and Olloch returns to his dormant state.

Navarog
When the Sphinx replaced the current occupant of the Quiet Box with Vanessa, he took into custody the previous occupant. Graulus the Demon revealed to Seth that the prisoner the Sphinx took out of the Quiet Box was in fact, Navarog, the Demon Prince, Lord of the Dragons, and that the Sphinx released him to retrieve the revenant's nail, starting the ball rolling that would plunge Fablehaven into the Shadow Plague.

== Book 3 - Fablehaven: Grip of the Shadow Plague ==
As the story continues in the third book, a new array of characters and magical creatures are introduced, from new friends at Lost Mesa, to a crowd of beings aiding Kendra and Seth in trying to defeat the shadow plague.

=== Major characters ===
Dougan Fisk
Dougan Fisk is Kendra and Gavin's lieutenant for the Knights of Dawn. He makes his first appearance in book 3. It is revealed that he is Maddox Fisk's brother. He goes on the mission with Kendra, Warren, and Gavin to get the artifact hidden at Lost Mesa. At the end of book 3, Dougan comes to Fablehaven and reveals that The Sphinx is the captain of the Knights of the Dawn, and is a traitor.

Gavin Rose
Gavin Rose is inducted as a member of the Knights of the Dawn with Kendra in the third book. He is 16 years old and goes on the mission with Kendra, Warren and Dougan to Lost Mesa to get the artifact. Gavin stutters sometimes when he talks, which gets worse if he is nervous. Gavin's father, Chuck Rose, was an expert dragon tamer, and kept his son a secret, but was eventually killed by a dragon. Gavin, a natural dragon tamer, can talk to dragons and is not affected by dragon's ability to paralyze humans by projecting fear. He also proves himself quite skilled at combat on the top of Lost Mesa when the party is ambushed by kachinas. At the end of book 3, Gavin goes on another mission and sends a letter to Kendra saying that he is interested in getting to know her better.

Mara Tabares
Mara is the daughter of Rosa, the caretaker of the Lost Mesa preserve. She was going to inherit the position after her mother, but after tragedy struck the preserve, decided to join the Knights of the Dawn instead.

Neil
Neil is one of the groundskeepers at the Lost Mesa secret preserve. He was a Native American apparently in his 50s, but he was also a member of Skinwalkers, who have the ability to turn into another animal at will. Neil turns into a horse to save several members of the artifact search party when they were attacked by kachinas on top of Lost Mesa. Neil is killed in Lost Mesa trying to retrieve the artifact.

Patton Burgess
Patton Burgess is Lena's husband and was the caretaker of Fablehaven in the late 1800s. He is mentioned in the first two books, but does not appear until the third book when Seth, with the aid of the Chronometer, inadvertently brings him through time to the present. Patton quickly learns of the plight Fablehaven is in with the Shadow Plague. He knows he only has three days to help save the preserve from being overtaken by the plague. In those three days Patton duels with a centaur, easily convinces Lena to leave the naiad pond again, and battles the dark creatures to defeat Ephira, Kurisock, and the Shadow Plague. Patton revealed that he had defeated the dragon Ranticus, and that he was fairystruck. He told Kendra that the Journal of Secrets was his personal journal that he wrote in with the special Umite crayon, indicating that he would be sending Kendra messages from the past. Patton refers to himself as "The World's Greatest Adventurer".

=== Minor characters ===
Rosa Tabares
Rosa is the Native American woman caretaker of the Lost Mesa magical preserve. She welcomes the Knights of the Dawn to stay at the manor during their stay as they attempt to retrieve the secret artifact located there. She is killed when Lost Mesa falls.

Hal
Hal is Rosa's spouse who takes Kendra and Gavin on a tour of the Lost Mesa preserve. An old, pot-bellied cowboy, he works to maintain the parts of the preserve associated with the homestead, such as the zombie graveyard, the museum, and Mazy the milch cow.

Tammy
Tammy is a knight of the Dawn who was assigned to the task force to retrieve the secret artifact from Lost Mesa. She joined Javier and Zack, the team leader, because of her skill and experience navigating magical traps and other dangers. She was the only one not injured in their failed first attempt. She accompanied Dougan, Warren, Kendra, Neil, and Gavin on the second trip up the mesa.

Javier
Javier is a knight of the Dawn who was assigned to the task force to retrieve the secret artifact from Lost Mesa. He is a skilled with potions, collecting and making. He was injured when their team walked in on Chalize, a young dragon and artifact guardian. She killed the team leader Zack before they knew what hit them. She swiped him with her tail, and he lost a leg and injured the other one. He did not accompany the second team's trip to the mesa.

=== Significant magical creatures ===
Cloudwing and Broadhoof
These are centaurs trapped by the Shadow Plague at the Fairy Queen's pond. They are pompous and arrogant, but they successfully lead the diversion against the dark creatures allowing Grandpa's party to safely escape to the old manor. Broadhoof loses a duel to Patton Burgess. They join the force attacking the dark creatures in the battle at Kurisock's tar pit.

Kurisock
The demon Kurisock is one of the four known demons on the Fablehaven preserve. He is barely mentioned in book 2, but not a focal character until book 3. He is described as a demon more of shadow than substance. After the dragon prince Navarog was released, he found the revenant's talismanic nail that Seth pulled out and discarded. He gave the powerful nail to Kurisock, who inserted it into Ephira's tree. Then he merged with the tree. With the cursed nail in the tree, both Kurisock and Ephira's power were greatly enhanced, and together they caused the Shadow Plague.

Graulas
Graulas is an ancient demon who once threatened the mountainous regions of India and China. He was admitted to Fablehaven essentially to die, and doesn't make an appearance until he notices that Seth successfully removes the nail from the Revenant. To thank Seth for his first surprise in centuries, he provides Seth with knowledge that helps them defeat the Shadow Plague.

Chalize
Chalize is a young dragon, who is very coppery and the dragon who Kendra finds that she can talk to some dragons. She is the first dragon that Gavin talks to in Fablehaven. Chalize is also mentioned in book 4. Chalize is also described as a Golden, coppery dragon with molten gold eyes.

== Book 4 - Fablehaven: Secrets of the Dragon Sanctuary ==
New challenges await the Knights of the Dawn at Wyrmroost. As the title implies, there are new dragons, and a few more new Knights of the Dawn as they infiltrate the Dragon Sanctuary.

=== Major characters ===
Trask
A Lieutenant in the Knights of the Dawn and a detective, Trask was the one who found Kendra after her abduction and escape. Other than being a natural leader during some expeditions, he is also a skilled dragon tamer, and he was chosen to lead the team that infiltrates the Dragon Sanctuary called Wyrmroost. He is captured with his team by Thronis the Sky Giant and agrees to retrieve some special figurines from the Dragon Temple to save their lives. His weapon of choice is a huge double cross-bow.

Torina Barker
Torina makes her first appearance in Book 4 as Kendra's abductor. She reveals herself as a lectoblix, who absorbs the youth of others with a bite. When Kendra first sees her she looks in her early 50s, but during her incarceration she witnesses her in the act of draining the youth from a new victim, and allows Kendra to flatter her on her new youthful appearance. She holds Kendra at her lair until the Sphinx takes custody of her.

Agad
The caretaker of Wyrmroost, Agad holds conference with Trask's team and reveals himself as one of the last actual wizards on Earth. He informs the team that they are there at their own risk, and that they cannot stay at the keep. He later reveals to Kendra that he was once a dragon, that all true wizards were once dragons, who opted to stay in human form.

Raxtus
A son of the Dragon King Celebrant, Raxtus was presumed dead when cockatrice invaded his nest and destroyed the eggs. His egg was rescued and he was raised by fairies. His primary guardian and teacher while growing up was Shiara. He calls himself the fairy dragon, and is much smaller than average. His breath heals and helps things grow. He has a silver, sleek appearance as if he was built for speed. Kendra says he is like a sports car. His best skill is flying, and he can turn invisible at will. He is shy, however, with low self-esteem, and is drawn to, but hesitates to make first contact with Kendra. They eventually connect and become fast friends.

=== Minor characters ===
Elise
Elise is a member of the Knights of the Dawn and she is placed as one of the guards over Kendra and Seth while they're away from Fablehaven. She also accompanies the team to retrieve the artifact at Obsidian Waste in book 5.

Cody and Haden
Cody and Haden are the victims of Torina the Lectoblix who befriended Kendra during her incarceration in Torina's lair. They were 32 and 28 years old respectively but had had their youth drained, making them old men. No one knows what happened to them after the book; while Cody seems to disappear, Haden is probably there in Torina's lair.

Darius and Nanora
Darius and Nanora are psychics in the Sphinx's entourage tasked to read Kendra's mind. They attempted to find information about the Chronometer, but fail, because her fairykind status renders her immune to mind tampering.

Aaron Stone
Aaron is a member of the Knights of the Dawn, and helicopter pilot assigned to transport the team set on entering Wyrmroost close to the front gate. He is also the pilot who flies the team from Perth to Obsidian Waste.

Gavin
A member of the Knights of the Dawn, Gavin is also an excellent dragon tamer. He has romantic feelings for Kendra, who reciprocates said feelings. Eventually, he reveals himself to be Navarog, the demon prince of dragons that is helping the Society Of The Evening Star.

=== Significant magical creatures ===
Bubda
A hermit troll who inhabits the space in the knapsack, Bubda can hide by making himself look like a crate or barrel. He likes his privacy, but relents when Seth and Warren have to spend time there. His favorite game is Yahtzee.

Nafia
Nafia is a dark dragon who threatens to eat Kendra and Seth while in Wyrmroost. Gavin pleads for their lives in the dragon tongue, and she allows it. She later approaches the team in human form, expressing her interest in helping them if they desire it. Agad reveals her to be the mother of Chalize, the dragon at Lost Mesa.

Zogo
Zogo is a dwarf who introduces himself as the "Giant's Dwarf". With the aid of several griffins, he apprehends the party and abducts them to Thronis, the Sky Giant.

Thronis
The only Sky Giant, and the largest of any giant in the world, Thronis is near 60 feet tall and lives in a mansion perched on the top of Stormcrag, one of the highest mountain peaks at Wyrmroost, the Dragon Sanctuary. He is a gifted sorcerer and controls the weather within the sanctuary. When Trask's party are captured by griffins under the command of the Giant's Dwarf, Zogo, they are brought to the giant at his lofty abode. He threatens to make pies out of them unless they can complete a task to retrieve some special objects from the Dragon Temple.

Chalize
Chalize is the dragon who burns down the Lost Mesa preserve, and the dragon Gavin-Naravog releases on the Lost Mesa preserve. None of the books say if Chalize was captured or killed.

== Book 5 - Fablehaven: Keys to the Demon Prison ==
The Artifact Keys have been found, and Kendra and Seth, and the Knights of the Dawn have a new quest to keep the artifact keys out of the hands of the Society, and stop them from opening the Demon Prison at all costs.

=== Major characters ===
Bracken
Bracken is a prisoner in the Living Mirage dungeon who befriends Seth and Kendra during their separate stays in the prison. He is later revealed to be a unicorn in human form. He is stuck in human form because of the loss of his third horn, which was crafted into the Font of Immortality, one of the secret artifacts. With Kendra, Warren, and Raxtus he escapes Living Mirage and travels with them across the globe in an attempt to protect the Eternals, the final impediment to the Society opening the Demon Prison.

Fairy Queen
The Fairy Queen has been a peripheral influence to Kendra through the whole series, but they do not meet in person until the 5th book. She is revealed to be a unicorn and the mother of Bracken and four other daughters. Her husband, the Fairy King, has been held captive by the demon Gorgrog and she attempts to free him.

=== Minor characters ===
Vincent
A Knight of the Dawn of Filipino descent, Vincent is assigned to Trask's party to Obsidian Waste as their guide because of his experience on the preserve.

Berrigan and Camira
Berrigan and Camira are brother and sister duo who work on the Obsidian Waste secret preserve, but Camira betrays Trask's team and leads them to an ambush. They escape and Berrigan helps the Knights retrieve the Translocator from the obsidian vault, the Dreamstone.

Laura
The caretaker of the Obsidian Waste preserve, Laura helps Trask and his team escape hidden enemies that have usurped the main homestead, and helps them get to the Dreamstone where the artifact is hidden.

Mirav
An old and evil wizard, one of the leaders of the Society of the Evening Star, Mirav is part of the task force to capture the knights at Obsidian Waste, and terminate the Eternals.

The Gray Assassin
A very skilled swordsman and assassin, famous for being able to kill anybody or anything, dressed entirely in gray, including a gray cloth over his face, he was also assigned to capture or kill the Knights of the Dawn at Obsidian Waste, and kill the Eternals.

Morisant
Morisant is a wizard and chief architect of the Demon Prison. In possession of Vasilis, he allowed hubris to corrupt him and was imprisoned behind the totem wall, and mostly turned to stone by his peers to inhibit his violent tendencies. After centuries of confinement, he finally sought redemption by giving Seth Vasilis, but only if Seth destroyed him.

The Eternals
The Eternals are five individuals who were established as part of the key to keep Zzyzx locked. As long as they live, the prison is sealed. Their job is to stay alive, and they have been for centuries, but now that the Society is close to opening the demon prison, they are a target. Kendra and Bracken travel far distances to warn three of them, Roon, Marcus, and Civia.

Hank and Gloria Larsen
Kendra and Seth's grandparents on their mother's side, they have been working as spies since their supposed deaths two years prior.

=== Significant magical creatures ===
Nagi Luna
Nagi Luna is an old hag in the form of a wretched old lady. She is extremely clairvoyant, but trapped in the Living Mirage dungeon. The Sphinx has been working with her to mastermind the opening of the demon prison.

Tollin
A dwarf who accompanies Grandma Larsen to Fablehaven, Tollin also betrays the rescue party at the Living Mirage preserve to the Sphinx.

Halad
Halad is a lammasu who helps Kendra, Warren, and Bracken escape the dungeon at Living Mirage.

Cormac
Cormac is a leprechaun at Fablehaven, who gets captured and reluctantly hands over to Seth items Patton Burgess says he needs.

The Singing Sisters
These sisters, joined at the wrists to make a three-person circle, can magically obtain any desired information for a steep price. They bargain with Seth for information on how to obtain the sword Vasilis. Their names are Berna, Orna and Wilna.

The Shape-Shifters
These creatures were established as guardians to the Eternals. They can change into any animal of similar size, excluding humans. Niko, the leader of the shape-shifters, watched over Roon Osricson, and preferred the shape of a white tiger. Tux was Mark's companion and preferred the shape of a black cat. Janan stayed with Civia, and preferred the shape of a white lap dog.

Gorgrog
Gorgrog is a Demon King and the leader of all demons, who escapes Zzyzx and fights the Fairy Queen on Shoreless Isle.

Celebrant
Widely known as the king of all dragons, Celebrant is the father of Raxtus, who makes his only appearance in Book 5. To help defeat the Demon hoard, he brings many other dragons to fight with him and Raxtus at the battle of Shoreless Isle. He has five breath weapons. Only one, a beam of white energy, was revealed while fighting the Demon Brogo.
