= Beyonders: A World Without Heroes =

2011 novel by Brandon Mull

- First edition
- Author: Brandon Mull
- Cover artist: Antonio J. Caparo
- Language: English
- Series: Beyonders series
- Genre: Fantasy, young adult fiction
- Publisher: Aladdin Books
- Publication date: 2011
- Publication place: United States
- Media type: Print (hardback & paperback)
- Pages: 454
- Followed by: Beyonders: Seeds of Rebellion

Beyonders: A World Without Heroes is a 2011 fantasy novel written by American author Brandon Mull. It is the first in the Beyonders trilogy.

== Setting ==
The novel is set in the parallel universe of Lyrian, a Medieval world ruled by a ruthless wizard, Maldor. Roads are both few and primitive, with nature dominating the majority of the landscape. Lyrian is mostly populated with humans, although several other races exist, including Displacers, who can detach limbs or other parts of their body without injury, and the Amar Kabal, powerful warriors whose bodies drop a seed on death that returns them to life. Magic in Lyrian takes the form of Edomic, a lost language which, when spoken properly, can command matter and energy in Lyrian. Edomic adepts are extremely rare and use of Edomic drains the user's energy and overexertion can cause them to collapse. Edomic has similarities to Jack Vance’s Dying Earth magic.

== Plot summary ==
Beyonders follows the exploits of a thirteen-year-old boy, Jason Walker.

Jason leads a relatively normal life until he is swallowed by a hippo while working at a zoo. Instead of being digested, he is transported to a world called Lyrian, ruled by the evil wizard Maldor.

Jason aimlessly wanders into the Repository of Learning and sneaks up to the forbidden second floor. He stumbles across a text, The Book of Salzared, bound in living human skin, that warns of great peril to anyone who reads it. The book describes a secret word, a powerful spell that will destroy Maldor if spoken in his presence, and gives the first syllable. As he reads, a human eye opens out of the book's cover and sees Jason. Terrified, Jason panics and flees. The Loremaster of the Repository informs Jason that he has sealed his own fate, and must leave immediately in search of the Blind King.

Arriving at the Blind King's decrepit keep, Jason learns that the "Blind King" is really Galloran, a broken hero who tried and failed to discover the secret word. Galloran introduces Jason to Rachel, a girl his age from "the Beyond", who arrived in Lyrian by walking through an empty stone arch. Rachel agrees to join Jason on the quest for the word, in the hope of destroying Maldor.

Jason and Rachel climb down a cliff to reach a clue to the word in a submerged cave. They learn the fourth syllable of the word and that it has six syllables, and that they should visit a disgraced lord named Nicholas Dangler in Trensicourt for further clues to the locations of the syllables. The pair manage to avoid a giant crab guarding the exit, but it kills an enchanted hound sent by Maldor to pursue them.

On the way to Trensicourt, Jason and Rachel meet Ferrin, a displacer capable of separating and reattaching his limbs without injury, who joins on their journey, and helps them when they are attacked by men conscripted by Maldor. Jason, Rachel, and Ferrin escape and travel to Trensicourt.

In Treniscourt, Jason and Rachel meet with Nicholas Dangler, and learn that the third syllable is hidden within a chamber in the castle. The only way to access this chamber is to beat the Chancellor of Trensicourt in a battle of wits. Jason challenges the Chancellor, and miraculously manages to beat him and learn the third syllable.

Jason, Ferrin, and Rachel and travel to the location of the fifth syllable, an island in the center of Whitelake, which is not buoyant, but hardens under pressure. Rachel manages to run to the island in the center of the lake where she meets an exiled displacer who has been reduced to a severed head and arm only. Rachel learns the next syllable, but the displacer reveals that Ferrin is working for Maldor. When confronted, Ferrin confirms his betrayal and parts ways with Rachel and Jason peacefully.

Rachel and Jason head to the location of the sixth syllable in the swampy Sunken Lands. On the way, they are attacked by Maldor's men, but are saved by a man named Jasher. Jasher is one of the Amar Kabal, legendary warriors capable of resurrecting from a seed. In the Sunken Lands, they meet the prophet's daughter, Corinne, who is unable to leave her home in the Sunken Lands due to mushrooms that cause memory loss. The group successfully collect the sixth syllable, and also learn that Galloran had hidden the second syllable within Harthenham, a paradisical castle where Maldor lavishly indulges his enemies in exchange for their allegiance.

Jason infiltrates Harthenham, having received an invitation after killing men working for Maldor, and identifies the final piece of the word. Jason is challenged to a duel by the host of Harthenham, and he chooses billiard balls as the weapon, easily winning thanks to his pitching skills from Earth. He escapes, joined by Tristan and Drake. Drake is a seedling like Jasher, but on his final life. The four leave but are attacked by Maldor's men and a pack of dogs. Tristan and Jasher are killed in the ensuing battle, and Jason is captured.

Drake rescues Jason and the two continue to Felrook, Maldor's fortress. Jason gains an audience with Maldor and uses the Word but it has no effect. Maldor reveals that he masterminded the Word himself to distract those who wished to harm him.

Jason is imprisoned and tortured, but is rescued by Ferrin, who sends him through a portal back to earth. Jason resists, and pulls Ferrin's severed hand along with him. Jason arrives back on Earth, on an unknown farm, and swears to find a way back to Lyrian to save his friends.

== Theme ==
The main theme of Beyonders: A World Without Heroes can be broadly interpreted as stressing the importance of moral responsibility and personal sacrifice in service of a greater cause. Lesser themes are Jason's coming of age, as well as his realization that the individual must sometimes accept unwanted responsibilities for the good of all. The presentation of Jason as a character focused on personal honour and resistance to temptation are in line with the symbolism of his being the last "true" hero of Lyrian.

== See also ==
- High fantasy
- Dark Fantasy
- Sword and Sorcery
