= Five Kingdoms: Sky Raiders =

2014 novel by Brandon Mull

- Author: Brandon Mull
- Audio read by: Keith Nobbs
- Language: English
- Series: Five Kingdoms series
- Genre: Fantasy, juvenile fiction, Adventure
- Publisher: Aladdin Paperbacks
- Publication date: 2014
- Publication place: United States
- Media type: Print (Hardcover And Paperback), audiobook, ebook
- Pages: 448
- ISBN: 978-1-442-49701-6
- Followed by: Five Kingdoms: Rogue Knight
- Website: http://www.enterthefivekingdoms.com/

Five Kingdoms: Sky Raiders is a 2014 fantasy novel written by American author Brandon Mull. It is the first novel in the Five Kingdoms series.

== Main characters ==
Ansel

The slaver who took Cole's friends to the Outskirts. He has a reputation as one of the meanest slavers and he hates Cole.

Cole Bryant Randolph

Cole lives in Mesa, Arizona with his parents and sister. He goes to the Outskirts in an attempt to save his friends but ends up as a Sky Raider. He is the primary protagonist of the Five Kingdoms Series. He uses both the Jumping Sword and Raw Shaping.

Dalton

Cole's best friend who was taken into slavery on Halloween with him.

Jace

A Sky Raider that was born into slavery. He is stubborn and has a magic rope. He also has a crush on Mira that Cole constantly teases him about.

Jenna Hunt

Cole's crush. She was among the kids taken to the Outskirts to be sold as slaves.

Miracle Salandra Pemberton

Goes by Mira but is secretly one of the five princesses presumed to be dead. She Cole, Jace and Twitch set off to defeat Carnag and overthrow her father, the High King.

Rueben (Twitch)

Rueben, who goes by Twitch due to the fact that he twitches a lot, is a Grindali that lived in Elloweer. When he left his home he was taken by a slaver and sold to the Sky Raiders. There he found a magical ring which allows him to be in his Grindali form whenever he wears it. Twitch's mission is to save his village, Kasori from the Swamp People.

=== High King ===
The High King is the ruler of the Outskirts, he took his daughter's powers away, and flushed 4 of the 5 Grand Shapers into hiding. (Declan lived in the Eastern Cloudwall.)

=== Hunter Aaron Randolph ===
A Enforcer who is feared among the Unseen, and is the older brother of Cole Randolph. Cole convinces him to switch sides in Book 3, Crystal Keepers.

== Reception ==
A writer at Kirkus Reviews states, “Mull gives his protagonist opportunities aplenty to demonstrate courage, quick wit and a talent for teasing. He also lays inventive twists on magical gear and workings and crafts such oddball monsters and settings that even a native-born character complains at one point, “I keep waiting for this to get less weird, and it keeps not happening.” From the evidence, readers may consider that a promise from the author.”

Carrie R. Wheadon from Common Sense Media stated in her review, “Fans of Brandon Mull know he needs a warm-up period with each of his series, and SKY RAIDERS is an OK warm-up that rabid fans will enjoy... But casual fans and readers who like a clear picture of where the story is headed at the regularly appointed time... will be drumming their fingers,... because the action isn't moving the story along. Another problem with spending most of the book making this new world cool and interesting: The main character, still a sixth grader, barely mentions parents or mourns the life he left behind. The omission seems almost as strange as, well, fighting plastic dinosaurs on top of a cheesecake.”

Simon Lipskar at Publishers Weekly stated in a review, “Although Mull packs quite a bit into this initial installment, he skillfully mixes the capricious logic of dreams with high stakes and constant danger. The intriguing premise, strong world-building, and numerous twists make this a real page-turner.”

Tori Ackerman stated in a book review for Deseret News, “While the Beyonders series hinted at a darker and more somber theme and Fablehaven stayed very lighthearted and humorous, "Sky Raiders" meets both of those needs for the reader in a perfectly blended mix.”

With regards to the audio book, an agent for Publishers Weekly stated in their review, “Narrator Nobbs projects a youthful voice appropriate to the characters in the novel. The strong narration of the more descriptive elements of the book provides a nice balance with the emotional states of the characters. However, occasionally the characters voices are indistinguishable from one and another, making it difficult to keep track of who said what.”
