= Fablehaven =

Young adult fantasy series

- Fablehaven, the first title published in June 2006
- Author: Brandon Mull
- Illustrator: Brandon Dorman
- Language: English
- Genre: Fantasy
- Publisher: Shadow Mountain Publishing
- Publication date: July 30, 2006 – March 23, 2010
- Publication place: United States
- Media type: Print (hardback & paperback)

Fablehaven is a fantasy book series for children written by Brandon Mull. The book series, which includes Fablehaven, Fablehaven: Rise of the Evening Star, Fablehaven: Grip of the Shadow Plague, Fablehaven: Secrets of the Dragon Sanctuary and Fablehaven: Keys to the Demon Prison, is published by Shadow Mountain in hardcover and Simon & Schuster in paperback. It is followed by the five-part sequel series Dragonwatch.

== Summary ==
The series begins as 13-year-old Kendra, and 11-year-old Seth Sorenson are traveling to their Grandpa and Grandma Sorenson's house while their parents are away on a 17-day cruise. When they get there, they also meet Dale, the groundskeeper, and Lena, the housekeeper. Grandma Sorenson is "mysteriously" missing. Grandpa Sorenson does not tell Kendra and Seth about Fablehaven being a secret preserve for magical creatures at first, but instead sets up a rather complex puzzle involving six keys and a locked journal for Kendra to solve. Once Kendra unlocks the mostly blank journal, she discovers the words "Drink the milk". She uses Seth to test the magical milk, and then tries it herself, opening their eyes to a whole new, mystical world full of the magical beings of Fablehaven. Then Kendra and Seth must face challenges such as defeating an evil witch named Muriel, a powerful demon, defending the preserve from an evil society, stopping a plague that changes creatures of light into creatures of darkness, and ultimately, protecting the world from a horde of imprisoned demons.

== Motifs ==
Magical creatures
Fablehaven is home to a wide variety of magical creatures of light, such as fairies, Brownies, nymphs, satyrs, unicorns and centaurs, and dark or inherently evil beings, such as trolls, goblins, werecreatures, ogres, giants, imps, and a few demons. A magical treaty protects all creatures, including humans outside creatures' domains. So long as the laws of the treaty are kept, the humans and magical beings are safe. Grandpa Sorensen explains to Kendra and Seth that some creatures are helpful, like Hugo the golem, and Mendigo the wooden puppet, and some are mischievous, but playful, like the satyrs or Fairies. He also warns them that none of them are good in the way they think of good, and many of them are dangerous and will kill them if given the chance.

Magical items
Many magical items are used in the series. They range from the simple but interesting, such as a silver ball with a distraction spell on it, to the amazingly powerful, such as the five magical artifacts hidden on the five secret preserves, which if used together would unlock the demon prison.

== Books ==
| # | Title | Released |
|---|---|---|
| 1 | Fablehaven | July 30, 2006 |
| 2 | Fablehaven: Rise of the Evening Star | May 31, 2007 |
| 3 | Fablehaven: Grip of the Shadow Plague | April 21, 2008 |
| 4 | Fablehaven: Secrets of the Dragon Sanctuary | March 24, 2009 |
| 5 | Fablehaven: Keys to the Demon Prison | March 23, 2010 |

| # | Title | Released |
|---|---|---|
| 1 | Dragonwatch | March 14, 2017 |
| 2 | Dragonwatch: Wrath of the Dragon King | October 23, 2018 |
| 3 | Dragonwatch: Master of the Phantom Isle | October 1, 2019 |
| 4 | Dragonwatch: Champion of the Titan Games | October 13, 2020 |
| 5 | Dragonwatch: Return of the Dragon Slayers | October 26, 2021 |

=== Fablehaven ===
The story begins with Kendra and Seth Sorenson visiting their grandparents in Connecticut while their parents take a 17-day cruise. At first, the siblings entertain themselves with an attic full of interesting books and toys, and a pond-like swimming pool surrounded by hummingbirds, brightly colored-butterflies and exotic dragonflies that seem too beautiful for a mortal creature. Soon their attention wanders to the forbidden forest that surrounds their grandparent's house. When Kendra discovers a book entitled Journal of Secrets, a journal with several blank pages, follows the directions to "Drink the milk" laid out for the humming birds/butterflies that is supposedly very poisonous, a whole new hidden and amazingly mysterious world is revealed to the siblings at Fablehaven. Kendra and Seth find out quickly how dangerous this new magical environment is when rules are broken, thrusting them into the middle of a long fight for their lives.

=== Fablehaven: Rise of the Evening Star ===
The second book returns to the Sorenson siblings the following year, where a strange new student has infiltrated the school in disguise, causing mischief, and Kendra is the only one who can see the charade. The Society of the Evening Star, an ancient organization determined to overthrow magical preserves and use them for their own intents and purposes, is on the move and is determined to infiltrate Fablehaven, one of five secret preserves. New characters are introduced who mentor Kendra and Seth with their knowledge of magical potions, animals, and magical items. In addition, these three specialists have a more perilous assignment - finding an artifact of great power hidden on the grounds. When the Evening Star pervades the gates of Fablehaven, it is assumed that someone inside the preserve is a traitor. If the artifact falls into the wrong hands, it could mean the downfall of other preserves and possibly the world.

=== Fablehaven: Grip of the Shadow Plague ===
The third book starts where the second book ended, during the same summer of their second year at Fablehaven. Seth, with help from the two satyrs, Newel and Doren, discovers that someone, or something, has released a plague that transforms beings of light into creatures of darkness. For the first time, some of the main characters visit another magical preserve, as another hidden artifact must be recovered from Lost Mesa in Arizona. New friends are introduced and new magical creatures of light and darkness are confronted, and hard sacrifices made.

=== Fablehaven: Secrets of the Dragon Sanctuary ===
Things are heating up between the Knights of the Dawn (sworn to protect the earth from magical dangers) and the Society of the Evening Star, who turn to kidnapping Kendra in an attempt to discover secrets. The race to obtain the five magical artifacts continues, and leads the Knights, and the Sorensons, to a deadly dragon Sanctuary called Wyrmroost. They face bigger challenges than they've ever faced before, including negotiating with a wizard, an enormous evil dragon, and the biggest giant in the world.

=== Fablehaven: Keys to the Demon Prison ===
The final book in the series has the Sorenson siblings traveling to different preserves around the earth in the attempt to secure the remaining magical artifacts before the Society gets them. A powerful new ally who is connected to the fairy realm joins the fight, but deadly new enemies also add to the escalation. The conflict separates Kendra and Seth who take on different missions, each extremely dangerous and exciting. They finally reunite just before the confrontation at Zzyzx, and the opening of the demon prison. An unexpected event orchestrated by the Fairy Queen was their only hope to save the world. She traps the demons in her realm while claiming Zzyzx as her new kingdom which is three times bigger than her old one.

=== Dragonwatch ===
In the new series, it has been four months since the Demon Prison was closed by Kendra and Seth, with help from the Knights of the Dawn, the Fairy Queen and her subjects, and the Dragons of Wyrmroost. Agad the wizard had to cut a deal with Celebrant the Just, King of Dragons to gain their assistance, and he was made a co-caretaker of the sanctuary. Celebrant is restless to gain more control and to ultimately release the dragons from their confinement. Draconic unrest is happening at all the dragon sanctuaries, and Agad was called away to assist at Soaring Cliffs, leaving an opening at Wyrmroost. The caretaker must be a Dragon Tamer, and Kendra and Seth qualify when in contact with each other. As the new caretakers of Wyrmroost, the siblings struggle not only for acceptance among the current Blackwell Keep inhabitants, but attempt to complete a desperate mission to strengthen the defenses of the castle, securing the safety of the inhabitants within, and the world beyond.

=== Dragonwatch: Wrath of the Dragon King ===
Celebrant invites Kendra and Seth to a yearly sanctuary feast. After receiving guidance Kendra and Seth agree to attend, but it is all part of a trap Celebrant has set up. Celebrant uses the feast to declare that war against the humans and also reveals that the second of seven dragon sanctuaries has fallen. Kendra and Seth must figure out a way to deal with a new deadly enemy, the Dark Unicorn Ronodin, while dealing with their first summer solstice at Wyrmroost. Making matters worse is a cursed castle that could hold secrets to help them or ruin them all; Knox and Tess learn the secrets of Fablehaven and Knox finds a way to take the two of them to Wyrmroost all while the war is occurring. Knox is tricked into leaving the Fablehaven keys behind with a goblin, but it causes a huge entrance weakness to Wyrmroost when the barrel disappears stranding everyone there. Kendra, Seth, and others venture into a cursed castle called Stormguard on the summer solstice, to fight for the legendary Wizenstone in a tournament started by Humbuggle the dwarf.

=== Dragonwatch: Master of the Phantom Isle ===
Cursed by the Key of Forgetting, Seth has lost all memory of his past—his relationships, his experiences, and who he really is. For now he aligns with his new mentor, Ronodin, the dark unicorn, who takes him to the Phantom Isle, the secret gateway to the Under Realm. Though Seth is not formally a prisoner, Ronodin wants to use him and his shadow charmer powers for his own dark ends. Kendra is frantic to find her missing brother, but the quest takes her and her companions, including Warren, Tanu, and Vanessa, far from Wyrmroost to Crescent Lagoon—a recently fallen dragon sanctuary made up of many islands and underwater domains. Its caretaker has regained a foothold on one of the islands. If Kendra and her friends can save that sanctuary, they might uncover the answers they need to rescue Seth. With each sanctuary the dragons overthrow, Celebrant, the Dragon King, comes closer to the dawn of a new Age of Dragons. With the forces of darkness on the march, Kendra and her allies try to gather enough power to win the dragon war.

=== Dragonwatch: Champion of the Titan Games ===
As the war with the dragons intensifies, all eyes are turning to Titan Valley for help. A dragon sanctuary unlike any of the others, this one is home to enslaved dragons ruled by the powerful Giant Queen, one of the five monarchs of the magical world. In addition, it houses the arena for the Titan Games, a series of gladiator-style battles presided over by none other than Humbuggle, the demon who stole Seth's memories.

== Reception ==
Fablehaven series has enjoyed positive reviews by critics. With the release of the third book, the series was awarded a spot on the New York Times top ten best selling children's series list. With the release of the fifth book, the series reached as high as 4th on the list.

Obert Skye, the author of Leven Thumps and the Gateway to Foo, wrote: "Imagination runs wild in Fablehaven. It is a lucky book that can hold this kind of story".

The New York Times - "Mull's awkward writing sometimes underscores the overfamiliar plot mechanics of the two-children-save-the-world fantasy, but his story offers unexpected twists and entertainingly scary creatures".

Columbia Daily Tribune - "This story is so compelling and so well written you'll find its magic working on you as well, completely taking over your ability to put the book down, even for a moment. Mull has an extraordinary writing ability".

Orson Scott Card - "At first glance, Fablehaven looks like a book for kids; but, like Harry Potter, Fablehaven can be read aloud in a family with as much pleasure for grownups as for children. And solitary adults who pick it up for their own enjoyment will be well rewarded. Do yourself a favor, and don't miss the first novel by a writer who is clearly going to be a major figure in popular fantasy".

Christopher Paolini, author of Eragon said: "The Fablehaven books are so entertaining that I read the first three in a single sitting. They kept me turning the pages until 4:40 in the morning. Each book was better than the last! Brandon Mull is a talented new fantasy writer, and I can't wait to read more from him. The world he has created is deep, intriguing, magical, and full of surprising discoveries and unexpected dangers. I especially liked his two main characters, Kendra and Seth. They both act like real people, and unlike many fictional siblings, they help and support each other when they're in trouble. The Fablehaven series is one of the most enjoyable fantasies I've read in the past few years. I only wish I could have read it when I was ten or twelve".

BookReview.com - "Where have all the fairies gone? To Fablehaven of course! A preserve for magical creatures awaits your visit in Brandon Mull's fantastical, wonderful book, Fablehaven. Look out J.K. Rowling; the fantasy genre has an outstanding new author to embrace!"

== Film adaptation ==
In 2006, producer Avi Arad (Iron Man, Spider-Man 2, X-Men, Ghost Rider) resigned his position at Marvel Studios to create his own production company, Arad Productions. He auctioned the rights to many books and video games. One of the novels Arad claimed was Brandon Mull's Fablehaven, but the production of the film didn't get much public support, and the project never got off the ground.

In 2012, Clark Schaffer, owner of Schaffer Studios, bought the rights to Fablehaven and was teaming up with author Brandon Mull and distributor Warner Bros. Pictures to make the film. No progress on the project was made and the rights lapsed.

In 2024, Angel Studios announced the production and distribution of the film adaptation of the first book, with plans to adapt the following books.

== See also ==
- List of Fablehaven characters
- List of Fablehaven's magical creatures
