= Fablehaven: Rise of the Evening Star =

2007 fantasy novel by Brandon Mull

- Author: Brandon Mull
- Illustrator: Brandon Dorman
- Language: English
- Series: Fablehaven
- Genre: Fantasy novel
- Publisher: Shadow Mountain, Aladdin Paperbacks
- Publication date: May 31, 2007
- Publication place: United States
- Media type: Print (hardcover and paperback), ebook and audiobook
- Pages: 441
- ISBN: 978-1-59038-742-9
- OCLC: 123515730
- Preceded by: Fablehaven
- Followed by: Fablehaven: Grip of the Shadow Plague

Fablehaven: Rise of the Evening Star is a fantasy novel written by Brandon Mull, released on May 31, 2007. It is the second book in the Fablehaven series. Its sequel is Fablehaven: Grip of the Shadow Plague.

== Plot summary ==
At the end of the school year, Kendra finds a kobold has infiltrated her eighth grade class. She can see mystical creatures without drinking a magical milk that is usually needed to enable humans to see such beings. Kendra can see this unseen world and its inhabitants without the milk elixir because the year before some fairies kissed her and gave her the power. To her, he is hideously repugnant, but to everyone else, he seems to be perfectly normal, even handsome boy. She knows this has problems written all over it. A couple days later, a man, who introduces himself as Errol Fisk, is found standing outside the school door. He tells them that he was sent by a Coulter, a friend of their grandfather. He tells them that they have been keeping an eye on the two Sorenson children and that he can get rid of the problem creature. Errol tells the children that to accomplish this, Kendra's brother, Seth, must retrieve a magical item from a mortuary. The mortuary is age protected from anyone who is 13 and older meaning that Seth, who is 12, is the only one that can enter. When he succeeds in getting the item by feeding it a dog biscuit, it bites him and teeth marks are left in his skin. Later, Errol asks Kendra and Seth to help him retrieve another object that can help save their grandparent's secret preserve for mythical beings, Fablehaven. Kendra is suspicious and so decides to call her Grandpa Sorenson but he fails to respond. After many failed attempts, her grandpa finally calls back and tells them not to go with Errol and that they did not send him. He tells Kendra a code word 'Kaleidoscope' and he tells them that a ride will be coming to pick them up and not to leave the house until then. Soon, a woman named Vanessa Santoro picks them up in a blue sports car. Errol pursues them, but they get away and arrive at the Fablehaven preserve safely in a short two hours.

The children learn that The Society of the Evening Star (known also as "The Society"), an ancient organization determined to overthrow magical preserves and use them for their own intents and purposes, is determined to infiltrate Fablehaven, and is rising in power and working its mischief faster than ever. Preserves all over the world are falling at an alarming rate. Stanley Sorenson, Kendra and Seth's grandad, who is also the Fablehaven caretaker, invites three specialists, approved by the mysterious Sphinx, to aid in the protection of the property: "Tanu" the Potion Master; Coulter, a magical relics collector; and his old friend, Vanessa, who is a mystical creature trapper. In addition to protection, these three specialists have a more perilous assignment — to find an artifact of great power that is hidden on the Fablehaven property. This mysterious artifact is one piece of a key that opens the great demon prison, Zzyzx, home to hundreds of thousands of the worst demons. If Zzyzx opens, the world as they know it would end. The children start learning from each of the specialists and learning more about the preserve. Dale takes the children to a cottage, where his brother Warren has been in a catatonic state for years after visiting a grove on the preserve. Dale tells them how he can encourage Warren to eat and move, but not act of his own accord. Warren reacts to Kendra when she touches him.

Later, The Sphinx meets with Kendra and Seth to discuss the situation. After giving Kendra an uncharged magical object, he determines that she is fairykind, something highly unusual that had not happened for centuries. Then, the Sphinx speaks to Seth and explains that Olloch the Glutton will prove perilous to him as Olloch's only goal is to consume Seth. After being fed by him in the beginning of the book, Olloch will continue to consume creatures until becoming large and strong enough to destroy anything and everything keeping him from Seth.

When Olloch the Glutton pervades the gates of Fablehaven, all evidence suggests that one of the three visitors is a traitor. Finding the traitor is critical, since if the artifact falls into the wrong hands, it could mean the downfall of other preserves and possibly the world. Although well-intentioned, Kendra and Seth become both a help and a hindrance to their grandfather's quest to protect Fablehaven.

Coulter awakens Seth and persuaded him to accompany him to an extremely dangerous part of Fablehaven, the grove at Four Hills, the place where Dale's brother, Warren, lost his mind. Once there, Coulter and Seth encounter a revenant that induces a fear so great, they become catatonic. Before Coulter and Seth succumb to the fear, Olloch finds Seth and Coulter. Coulter appears to become disoriented and forces something into Seth's mouth: a cocoon that is impenetrable. In the morning back at the house, Kendra is distraught about the supposed death of her brother Seth. Grandpa Sorenson finally resolves that Coulter was not acting of his own accord because his plan was so clumsy. That night, Dale is caught up in the Thief's Net which guards an artificial, pretend key. He had awoken to find himself stuck there. Suddenly, all the evidence matches up and the traitor seizes control of the house. Vanessa is revealed to be a narcoblix and a fight breaks out. Tanu, who has been put under Vanessa's control along with everyone else in the house, chases Kendra into the woods.

Kendra heads to find Lena with the water nymphs, as she has no other ideas who to go to for help. Kendra upsets the nymphs, who release Mendigo, the limberjack. Mendigo and Kendra tussle, and Mendigo captures Kendra and takes her to the chapel from Book 1. His last command from Muriel was to bring Kendra to Muriel, who is buried with the demon beneath the chapel. A fairy guarding the Chapel ends up helping Kendra change Mendigo to follow her orders instead. Kendra heads to the cottage where Warren is kept to regroup. Meanwhile, Seth awakens inside the cocoon inside Olloch. He ends up passing completely through Olloch and breaks out of the cocoon. Disoriented, he finds a closed up old mansion and decides to enter to climb onto the roof, so that he can get a view of his surroundings and decide where to go. From the top of the mansion, Seth can see the cottage and heads towards it.

At the cottage, Kendra and Seth are reunited. They disagree on how to move forward. Seth wants to take Tanu's courage potion and defeat the revenant so they can retrieve the artifact hidden on the preserve. Seth argues that they can use the artifact to defeat Vanessa and Errol and take back Fablehaven. Seth takes off with Mendigo when Kendra is in the bathroom. Seth defeats the revenant, but nearly dies doing so, and is rendered unconscious. Back at the cottage, Warren is restored by the revenant's defeat. He and Kendra realize that this must mean that Seth was successful and go to find him.

Warren and Kendra find Seth and send him back to the cottage. They decide to finish attempting to recover the artifact. The enter the inverted tower and have to overcome multiple obstacles. Vanessa and Errol catch up with them during the final challenge. Errol dies during the final challenge, Warren and Vanessa are badly beaten and dying. Tanu and Coulter arrive and Tanu wins the battle, and the artifact, which has near-infinite powers of healing that save Warren and Vanessa. They find that the Sphinx is there as well to take the artifact somewhere safe. After everyone is reunited at the house, they decide to lock Vanessa up in a quiet box where her magic can no longer control the others while they sleep. To do this, they have to remove the previous occupant, and the Sphinx says he will imprison the previous occupant elsewhere.

Something Vanessa said to Kendra made Kendra look for a secret message from Vanessa, which she found in her cell. The secret message revealed an accusation from Vanessa that the Sphinx is the leader of the Society of the Evening Star, news that Kendra shares with her grandparents.
