= Fablehaven: Grip of the Shadow Plague =

2008 novel by Brandon Mull

- First edition
- Author: Brandon Mull
- Illustrator: Brandon Dorman
- Language: English
- Series: Fablehaven
- Genre: Fantasy novel
- Publisher: Shadow Mountain
- Publication date: April 21, 2008
- Publication place: United States
- Media type: Print (hardcover and paperback), ebook and audiobook
- Pages: 487
- ISBN: 978-1-59038-898-3
- OCLC: 261177520
- Preceded by: Fablehaven: Rise of the Evening Star
- Followed by: Fablehaven: Secrets of the Dragon Sanctuary

Fablehaven: Grip of the Shadow Plague is the third novel in the Fablehaven fantasy series written by Brandon Mull. The book was released on April 21, 2008. These stories often involve mythological creatures such as fairies. A sequel, Fablehaven: Secrets of the Dragon Sanctuary, was released in 2009.

== Plot summary ==
This book picks up where Fablehaven: Rise of the Evening Star leaves off, during the same summer of the second year at Fablehaven. During the Summer, Kendra is recruited by the Knights of the Dawn, a secret organization that opposes the Society of the Evening Star, and for the first time, Kendra and Warren must visit another magical preserve, called Lost Mesa, that is located in the state of Arizona. They reside there, with Lieutenant Dougan Fisk, and dragon tamer Gavin Rose (whom Kendra has feelings for). Another hidden artifact must be recovered from Lost Mesa, before The Society unveils it first.

Meanwhile, Seth discovers that someone, or something, has released a plague throughout Fablehaven, that turns light creatures into dark creatures. His grandparents resolve to stay at Fablehaven to defend it, but it becomes clear that they can no longer protect the preserve. As light creatures can enter most places throughout the preserve, the same rules apply to their darker forms. As the plague spreads, Coulter is turned into a shadow and darkened Brownies overthrow the house and the caretakers flee with Seth to the grove around the naiad pool, now trapped inside Fablehaven. Seth, his grandparents, and Tanu must try to solve the mystery of the plague. Seth discovers that he has gained new abilities after destroying Fablehaven's revenant. He is able to communicate with the shadow Coulter, who remains on their side, hear the voices of prisoners from the dungeon that dwell underneath the main house, and speak the language of many creatures such as imps, goblins, trolls, demons, and giants.

Kendra and the group at Lost Mesa manage to enter the Painted Mesa, the location of the artifact, and survive, though several members of the Knights are killed in the process. Kendra then discovers that Patton Burgess had retrieved the artifact and hidden it at Fablehaven.

Seth and the other caretakers enter the original Fablehaven manor, which was abandoned after the caretaker of that time and his family were killed by a mysterious being, with Patton Burgess being the only survivor. After entering the manor, a mysterious woman made up of darkness turns everyone but Seth into shadows, but Seth finds the Chronometer, the artifact that Patton had stolen from Lost Mesa, and accidentally brings Patton forward in time for three days. With Patton's help, Seth escapes.

Returning from Lost Mesa, Kendra learns that Warren, Grandpa, Grandma, Dale, Tanu, and Coulter have been turned into shadows, visible only to Seth but retaining their goodness. Patton tells Seth and Kendra that the woman who attacked Seth at the manor and caused the plague is a fallen hamadryad named Ephira who became mortal and went to Kurisock, a powerful demon, to help her regain her immortality. Patton, Kendra and Seth recruit the remaining light creatures, who have taken refuge at the naiads' pool, to help them take down the dark ones and restore the preserve. Lena also leaves the naiads and becomes human again in order to be with Patton. Kendra visits the Fairy Queen's shrine for help, and the Queen creates a stone that can stop the plague, destroying the shrine in the process. With the help of the light creatures, Patton, Seth and Kendra battle to Kurisock's lair where Lena gives her life to destroy Kurisock, Ephira, and the plague.

After the plague is stopped, Dougan comes to escort Kendra and Seth home. He also shares that the Sphinx is a traitor, confirming Vanessa's earlier suspicions.
