= Fablehaven: Keys to the Demon Prison =

2010 novel by Brandon Mull

- Cover art
- Author: Brandon Mull
- Illustrator: Brandon Dorman
- Language: English
- Series: Fablehaven
- Genre: Fantasy novel
- Publisher: Shadow Mountain
- Publication date: March 23, 2010
- Publication place: United States
- Media type: Print (hardback & paperback), ebook and audiobook
- Pages: 593 (hardcover edition)
- ISBN: 978-1-60641-238-1
- Preceded by: Fablehaven: Secrets of the Dragon Sanctuary

Fablehaven: Keys to the Demon Prison is the fifth and final installment in the Fablehaven series by Brandon Mull.

== Plot ==
Kendra, Seth, and the Knights of the Dawn continue to take the last possible steps to safeguard the keys and locks placed on Zzyzx. Graulas asks Seth to recover the Sands of Sanctity to ease his suffering as he dies and Seth agrees.

Kendra, Seth, and the Knights of the Dawn go to Obsidian Waste, the secret preserve in Australia, to get the Translocater, a magical teleportation device and one of the five keys to Zzyzx. They are welcomed by the caretaker Laura and twins Camira and Berrigan. Laura quickly kills Camira because she was plotting behind their backs, and reveals that many members of the Society of the Evening Star are waiting to ambush them. Several members of the Society appear and the group quickly flees to the Obsidian Vault where the Translocater is hidden. Laura sacrificed herself in order to stall the society from capturing the group and one of the team members Vincent died during the trials. After a series of trials they get the artifact, only for the Society to capture Seth, Mara, and Berrigan, while Trask, Tanu, Elise, and Kendra escape with the Translocater.

After being captured, Seth is summoned to talk with the Sphinx. The Sphinx reveals that they are in Living Mirage, the fifth secret preserve, that he is the caretaker of. He also tells Seth that he is a shadow charmer and that he has the Font of Immortality and the Oculus, the last artifacts. The Sphinx imprisons Seth in the dungeon where Seth reunites with Maddox and befriends Bracken, another prisoner. Seth learns that Bracken is a unicorn with no horn and is stuck in human form due to him giving up his third horn to make the Font of Immortality. Then he takes Seth to Nagi Luna, a demoness who mentored the Sphinx. When Seth and Nagi Luna telepathically communicate, Nagi Luna reveals that she secretly wishes to betray the Sphinx and open Zzyzx on her terms. She offers to give Seth power and that they will betray the Sphinx together but Seth refuses.

Back in Fablehaven, Vanessa reveals her secret: Grandpa and Grandma Larsen are alive and are undercover spies for the Knights of Dawn at Living Mirage. Kendra and the rest plan a rescue mission with the Translocater, but they are captured by the Sphinx in the attempt, thus giving the Society four artifacts. Kendra is summoned to talk to the Sphinx where he reveals his master plan. While Kendra is talking with the Sphinx, a mysterious figure slips Seth a sack containing the Translocater and the Sands of Sanctity. With the Translocater, Seth escapes to Fablehaven and uses the Sands to heal Graulas, but Graulas betrays him and takes the Translocater and the Sands, revealing that Nagi Luna was the one who had the artifacts slipped to Seth. Graulas quickly overthrows the treaty and claims the Chronometer, killing Coulter in the process. He then teleports to Living Mirage and takes over the Society of the Evening Star.

Just before, Kendra is taken to the dungeon and meets Bracken. They both are broken out by Warren with the help of the Sphinx and the three, Kendra, Warren, and Bracken, head to the local fairy shrine where the Fairy Queen sends Raxtus the dragon to help them escape over the preserve's wall.

Meanwhile, Seth follows Coulter's last words to a secret message left by Patton Burgess. In the message, Patton suggests some truly desperate ideas to prepare to oppose the demon hordes. Seth allies with Vanessa and the satyrs and enlists wraiths from the dungeon to protect the house at Fablehaven from the rebelling centaurs, then visits and bargains with the Singing Sisters in order to locate a powerful weapon, the sword Vasilis from the age of wonders. This information takes him to the Totem Wall, where he slays one of Zzyzx's founders to claim the sword.

As Seth prepares for Zzyzx to open, Bracken, Warren, Kendra and Raxtus race to beat the Society to the final locks that hold Zzyzx shut, the last Eternals, an immortal humans who must be killed before the demon prison can be opened. They fail, but Bracken retrieves his second horn, and they kill Mirav and Torina in the process.

Everyone meets up with Seth at the place where the ghost ship, the Lady Luck, will pick them up to take them to the location of Zzyzx, Shoreless Isle. After Seth uses his powers to procure passage they sail to the island. There, they find the Fairy Queen's shrine near the dome holding Zzyzx. Kendra and Bracken speak once more to the Fairy Queen, who tells them that she has destroyed all of her other shrines, and that they have one final secret plan. The astrids are restored as the guardians of the fairy world and are equipped for battle. For the plan to work they need the five artifacts, so Seth, some astrids, and a repentant Sphinx teleport into Zzyzx and reclaim the artifacts. Seth uses Vasilis to slay Nagi Luna and Graulus, while Kendra uses Vasilis to kill the Demon King. After evacuating her world, the Fairy Queen allows the remaining demons to rush into her newly cut off world, trapping them there. With the artifacts in hand, Agad the wizard locks the demons in and the Fairy Queen makes Zzyzx her new home.

Kendra, Seth, their parents and their grandparents move to the re-established Fablehaven. Raxtus visits and reveals that the Fairy Shrine at Fablehaven has been restored. He takes Kendra there, where she meets Bracken. The book closes as Kendra and Bracken contemplate their future together.

== Recurring characters ==
Agad is a wizard who was once a dragon, but permanently transformed into his human avatar forever to gain more magical power. He is the caretaker of one of the three dragon sanctuaries/preserves, Wyrmroost, which are closed to human interference. After the fight on Shoreless Isle, the dragons at Wyrmroost are governed by the king of dragons, Celebrant, because Agad is named the caretaker of Living Mirage after the Sphinx has asked to become an Eternal.

Fairy Queen is the "queen" of fairies. She is immensely powerful and is respected by all creatures of light. The Fairy Queen is widely considered the most powerful entity of creatures of light. It is not widely known that she is a unicorn. Bracken is her son, and the supposedly dead Fairy King is her consort.

Coulter Dixon is a friend of Seth and Kendra's grandparents. He collects magical relics and is in the Knights of the Dawn. He is known for owning a frayed, fingerless leather glove that makes the wearer invisible when they hold still. He is killed by Graulas after the demon is healed by the Sands of Sanctity.

Vanessa Santoro is a traitor to the Knights of the Dawn. She worked for the Society of the Evening Star, but she knew the Sphinx's true identity. Fearing for his safety, the Sphinx imprisoned her in the Quiet Box at Fablehaven. Because of what the Sphinx did, she switched sides. It is hinted that she has affections for Warren.

The Sphinx is a former captain of the Knights of the Dawn. When exposed as a traitor working for the Society of the Evening Star, he ran to secrecy and began to plot and kill even more than he had before. After Graulas usurped control of the Society from him he assisted the Knights to defeat the demon horde, and becomes an Eternal as his joint punishment and reward.

Tanugatoa (Tanu) is a potion master and friend of Kendra and Seth's grandparents. He is a Knight of the Dawn.

Graulas is an old demon who officially made Seth a shadow charmer. When healed with the Sands of Sanctity he betrays Seth and plays a major role in the opening of the demon prison, Zzyzx. He is killed by Seth with Vasilis shortly after the opening of Zzyzx.

Raxtus is a friendly dragon who befriends Kendra in the fourth book. He is the son of the great dragon Celebrant but is considered pathetic because of his small size. Celebrant eventually accepts his son after he proves himself in battle.

Seth Sorenson is Kendra's younger brother, who starts the series at age 11. He has a much more outgoing, risky, curious, and adventurous personality. Seth has great courage, but he has little patience, and he does not always think things through. Because of this, he tends to be the source of mischief as the story continues, most often trading batteries with the satyr's Newel and Doren. After learning many lessons the hard way, he eventually becomes more responsible and succeeds in overcoming many obstacles. His efforts against dark forces eventually mark him with the powers of a shadow charmer that, like his sister with her fairykind abilities, he is able to use throughout the series to successfully complete nearly impossible tasks.

Kendra Sorenson is a typical 14-year-old girl who is not enthusiastic to go on a mandatory vacation to her grandparents place, while her parents are on a 17-day cruise. She later becomes immersed in a whole new world full of fairies and other mystical creatures, called Fablehaven, the magical preserve where her grandparents oversee. She is described as a good student who rarely takes risks, overly cautious, and far from the adventurer and rule breaker that her brother is. When she is in Fablehaven, it does not take long for trouble to find her, as the evil witch Muriel Taggert releases a powerful demon named Bahumat. The situation becomes desperate when everyone but her is captured and she must risk her own life to seek the Fairy Queen for help. As a result of her heart-felt supplication to the Fairy Queen, she becomes fairykind, a status which gives her certain magical abilities to aid her in her subsequent adventures.

== New characters ==
Bracken is a unicorn that is imprisoned by the Sphinx in the dungeon in the Living Mirage preserve. Bracken is trapped as a human due to him surrendering his third horn centuries ago, which became the Artifact known as Font of Immortality. He meets Seth and Kendra at different times in the dungeon, but he, Kendra, and Warren escape with the Sphinx's help after the demon Graulas has taken all of the artifacts from Fablehaven and usurped the power of the Sphinx. Later in the book Kendra learns that Bracken is the Fairy Queen's son and eventually goes on to become Kendra's love interest.

Nagi Luna is an old demon in the dungeon (Ring of Constraint) at Living Mirage. She was the demon that trained the Sphinx to become a full Shadow Charmer. She has drooping purple skin and looks harmless, but she can take possession of people and attack with inhuman strength. She has a slab of concrete chained to her ankle with arcane characters carved onto it. She dies when Seth flings Vasilis at her shortly after the opening of Zzyzx.

The Gray Assassin is a member of the Society of the Evening Star that is notorious for being able to kill just about anyone. He has two curved swords that of which the handles are fashioned with dragon teeth, and heavily enchanted. Bracken kills him after Civia, the last Eternal, dies.

Mirav is a wizard and formerly a dragon. Mirav is a member of the Society of the Evening Star. He is more powerful at night and cannot withstand daylight. Bracken kills him after the wizard foolishly tries to use Bracken's second horn against him.

Morisant is one of the wizards that founded Zzyzx and the chief architect. He tried to cheat death by trying to make himself one of the Undead, which did not work the way he hoped. He is the owner of Vasilis and gives the great sword to Seth in return for Seth's promise to unmake him.

Eternals are people whose deaths are the final step at opening Zzyzx. They can only be killed by phoenix fire, a unicorn horn, dragon breath, or any other weapon of similar potency. The last three Eternals are Roon, Mark and Civia.

Laura is the caretaker of Obsidian Waste. She helped Kendra, Seth, and everyone else escape Berrigan, who had been bitten by a narcoblix, and his sister Camira.

== New places ==
Living Mirage is the final secret preserve located in eastern Turkey that contains the Font of Immortality. The Sphinx is the caretaker of this preserve. It is an extremely dangerous preserve, with a ziggurat dungeon and powerful creatures.

Shoreless Isle is the island where Zzyzx is located. It is an immense island that, strangely enough, has great beauty. The island can only be reached via unconventional means because of an enormously powerful distraction spell, placed there by Zzyzx's creators. It is located in the middle of an area known as the Bermuda Triangle.

Stony Vale is a secure preserve in Scotland where Kendra goes to talk to the Fairy Queen.

The Singing Sisters Lair is a small island in the Mississippi River where the Singing Sisters reside and is operated by trolls. The island possesses an apparently human guardian tasked with dissuading those who are not willing to make the sacrifices necessary to bargain with the Sisters. His method of doing so involves a friendly chat, peanut butter sandwiches, and root beer.

The Totem Wall is a wall made of totems that will talk when addressed on top of a stump. They are very wise, and hide many secrets and items. Seth destroys Morrisant, who was trapped within the wall, and took Vasilis from its hiding place.

Obsidian Waste is a sanctuary where the Translocator is located and is protected by the caretaker Laura.

== Release date controversy ==
The release date was planned to be March 20, 2010, but some major booksellers started selling copies one day earlier. Shadow Mountain, the book's publisher, was alerted of this later that day, but thousands of copies had already been sold. Due to this, after receiving apologies from the booksellers, Shadow Mountain allowed the booksellers to continue selling copies, and changed the official release date to March 19.
