= Fablehaven: Secrets of the Dragon Sanctuary =

2009 novel by Brandon Mull

- First edition
- Author: Brandon Mull
- Illustrator: Brandon Dorman
- Language: English
- Series: Fablehaven
- Genre: Fantasy novel
- Publisher: Shadow Mountain
- Publication date: March 24, 2009
- Publication place: United States
- Media type: Print (hardcover and paperback), ebook and audiobook
- Pages: 535
- ISBN: 978-1-60641-042-4
- OCLC: 285597885
- Preceded by: Fablehaven: Grip of the Shadow Plague
- Followed by: Fablehaven: Keys to the Demon Prison

Fablehaven: Secrets of the Dragon Sanctuary is the fourth novel in Fablehaven series.

This book starts off at the end of the third book, where the Society of the Evening Star make some dangerous moves. Seth and Kendra are thrust into another treacherous adventure, where they leave the preserve and explore others. In this story, they visit a preserve for dragons, wyrmroost, strange changes are wrought in Seth, and the Society go further than they ever have. It is followed by the last book in the main series, Fablehaven: Keys to the Demon Prison, which was released in 2010.

== Plot summary ==
Just before Christmas break, Kendra is kidnapped by a member of the Society of the Evening Star and replaced by a Stingbulb (a plant that, once it stings someone, will grow into a perfect replica, but die after a few days). Warren and Seth notice something odd with the clone after they intercept a letter revealing secrets, but when it is confronted, it swallows a pill and dies. They bury the clone (unaware it is not Kendra) and return to Fablehaven. Meanwhile, Kendra is taken to the home of a lectoblix (able to drain the youth out of people) named Torina to await a meeting with the Sphinx.

The Sphinx arrives and forces Kendra to use the Oculus, one of the magical artifacts that can open the door to Zzyzx. With it, Kendra is able to see everywhere at once, but it becomes overwhelming. The Fairy Queen is able to help Kendra release the crystal. Back at Fablehaven, another stingbulb infiltrates the group, this time in the form of Maddox. He releases Vanessa from the Quiet Box, but she knocks him unconscious and tells Grandpa Sorenson. With her help, they discover a plan to rescue Kendra, but the group is still distrustful of her. Kendra receives a note and a knapsack that contains a magical room and a stingbulb. She creates a clone of herself, enters the knapsack, and escapes the house. She is picked up by Trask, a Knight of the Dawn, and returned to Fablehaven.

In the journal of Patton Burgess, Kendra learns there is a secret message about where the other magical artifacts are. They read the message and learn about the Oculus, as well as the Translocator. In order to recover the Translocator, they must go to the Dragon Sanctuary and find a key. To enter the sanctuary, they must obtain a unicorn horn. In the Hall of Dread, Seth can hear the whispers of the shades imprisoned there, prompting the Sorensons to make Kendra and Seth spend Midwinter at a hotel for safety. They are, however, attacked by members of the Society, which Seth manages to spot using his then-unknown abilities in time to stop them.

The only unicorn horn in Fablehaven was the property of the centaurs, but they refuse to let the group borrow it. Seth hears Graulus (the demon) call for him. He sneaks out to see him and there he learns he is a Shadow Charmer, and that he is able to hide in dim light, communicate with dark creatures, see invisible objects, and is immune to magical fear. With these skills, he successfully steals the unicorn horn from the centaurs. With the horn, Kendra, Dougan, Trask, Mara, Gavin, Warren, and Tanu set off to the Dragon Sanctuary to recover the key. Seth is hiding in the magical knapsack.

They arrive at the Sanctuary and meet the caretaker Agad, a dragon who turned into a human in order to become a great wizard. He gives them directions to the Fairy Shrine in Thronis's (a sky Giant) domain. Along the way, they meet a dragon named Nafia and Warren gets injured and must remain in the knapsack. When they arrive, Thronis captures everyone except Warren and Kendra. Kendra meets a fairy dragon named Raxtus who is very nice and agrees to help her reach the Fairy Shrine. There, Kendra learns the way to the Dragon Temple. Raxtus agrees to take her there, but refuses to help further as it would be a betrayal to dragons. Meanwhile, Seth helps the group strike a deal with Thronis to obtain some items from the Temple in exchange for their freedom.

The group returns to the entrance to the temple. They survive the Hydra, kill Grommus (the group is put to sleep, but Vanessa takes over Tanu's body and slays the dragon) and Seth and Kendra team up to use the unicorn horn to dispatch Silleta the poison dragon. Mendigo is dissolved in the process. Gavin heads back to try to deal with the Hydra, while the remaining group gathers the items for Thronis and the key.

When they leave the temple, they are ambushed by two dragons. Tanu and Seth escape on Griffins to Thronis's tower. Gavin (who is Navarog, the Demon prince dragon) turns into a dragon, eats Dougan, and fights off the two dragons. Kendra escapes a cleft, and Gavin is forced to take human shape again to reach her. He destroys the knapsack (trapping Warren inside) and takes the key and the unicorn horn. Raxtus, small and invisible as he is, sneaks up behind Gavin and eats him.

The remaining group returns to Fablehaven with the key, and gives the horn back to the centaurs, claiming they rescued it from the Society of the Evening Star. They begin to make plans to recover the next artifact. It is revealed that Kendra and Seth's parents have been kidnapped by the Society.

== Author's interview ==
Brandon Mull had an interview with SciFiChick in March 2009, where he talked about his book. When Mull was asked how he got ideas for his unique characters, he said that most of the creatures at Fablehaven and the other magical wildlife parks in the books came from different myths and legends, such as Greek mythology, German and Scandinavian folklore, and Native American legends. Mull feels that his job as an author is to take familiar mythical creatures and figure out how they fit into his books. Mull said that he was inspired by various fantasy books and films when writing the books. Wyrmroost, the dragon sanctuary which appears in the fourth Fablehaven title, was inspired by Mull's visit to Glacier National Park.

== Book review ==
The book was given 4.9 stars out of 5, based on 1,039 global ratings.
