= Brandon Mull =

American author (born 1974)

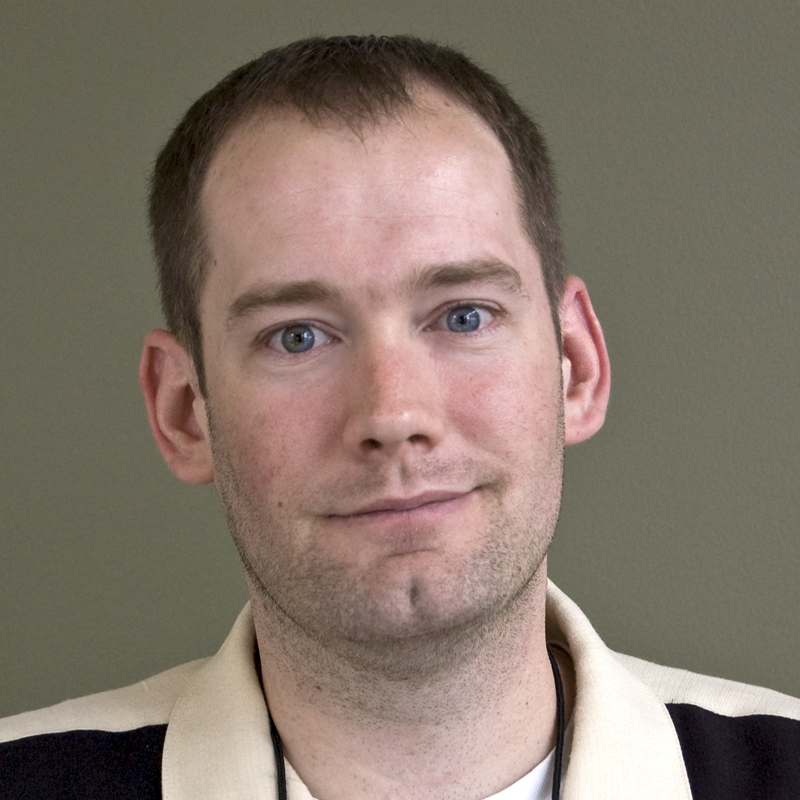
- Mull at Mountain-Con in 2008
- Born: November 8, 1974 (age 51); Utah, U.S.
- Education: Brigham Young University
- Occupation: Writer
- Children: 11
- Writing career
- Language: English
- Period: 2006–present
- Genres: Young adult fiction, fantasy
- Notable works: Fablehaven series, the Dragonwatch series, the Beyonders series, the Candy Shop War series, the Guardians series and the Five Kingdoms series
- Website: brandonmull.com

Brandon Mull (born November 8, 1974) is an American author best known for his children's fantasy series, Fablehaven, as well as Dragonwatch, The Candy Shop War, the Beyonders trilogy, and the Five Kingdoms series. He also began the Spirit Animals series.

In June 2020, Mull married Erlyn Madsen. Together, they have a total of eleven children, with four from his previous marriage and seven from hers.

He is inspired by J. R. R. Tolkien, C. S. Lewis, and J. K. Rowling.

== Education and early work ==
Brandon Mull went to Mt. Diablo Elementary School in Clayton, California. Mull then attended Pine Hollow Middle School as a student, and then attended Clayton Valley. He currently lives in Alpine, Utah, and is a graduate of Brigham Young University in Utah. While at BYU Mull led the sketch comedy group Divine Comedy. Mull served a two-year mission for The Church of Jesus Christ of Latter-day Saints in Chile.

As a child, Mull was known for a strong imagination. He would sometimes spend hours in his bedroom, without toys, just imagining and acting out stories that were in his head. In school, his constant day dreaming sometimes irritated teachers while others encouraged his imagination.

== Career ==
Mull has worked as a comedian, a filing clerk, a patio installer, a movie promoter, a copywriter, and briefly as a chicken stacker.

Mull's first novel was unsuccessful and remains unpublished. The failure led him to a job working as a marketer for the film Saints and Soldiers. It wasn't until after the film company he worked for was acquired by a publishing company that Mull successfully published his first novel, Fablehaven.

In 2013, Fablehaven was optioned by Schaffer Studios for possible film or television adaptation.

== Published works ==
=== Fablehaven Series ===
==== Fablehaven ====
Fablehaven is about siblings Seth and Kendra Sorenson who find out their grandfather and grandmother run Fablehaven, one of the magical reserves where mythical creatures can live in peace. They must do what they can to continue the life of the preserve.

- Fablehaven, Shadow Mountain, June 14, 2006, ISBN 978-1-59038-581-4
- Fablehaven: Rise of the Evening Star, Shadow Mountain, May 1, 2007, ISBN 978-1-59038-742-9
- Fablehaven: Grip of the Shadow Plague, Shadow Mountain, April 12, 2008, ISBN 978-1-59038-898-3
- Fablehaven: Secrets of the Dragon Sanctuary, Shadow Mountain, March 24, 2009, ISBN 978-1-60641-042-4
- Fablehaven: Keys to the Demon Prison, Shadow Mountain, March 23, 2010, ISBN 978-1-60641-238-1
- The Caretaker's Guide to Fablehaven, Shadow Mountain, October 13, 2015, ISBN 978-1629720913

==== Dragonwatch ====
Dragonwatch is a sequel series to Fablehaven that spans 5 books. Books 1, 2, and 3 were released March 2017, October 2018, and October 2019 respectively, book 4 was released October 2020; book 5 was released in October 2021. In the story the dragons will seek to escape the sanctuaries they've been placed in, seeing them as prisons. The only thing that can keep them under control is the order of the Dragonwatch, but most of the Dragonwatch members have died of old age. A wizard named Agad decides to seek out Grandpa Sorensen for help, and in the process Kendra and Seth. Kendra and Seth will have to unite forces to become dragon tamers and caretakers of Wyrmroost to keep the dragons from escaping.

A prequel called Legend of the Dragon Slayer was published between the fourth and fifth books.

- Dragonwatch: A Fablehaven Adventure, Shadow Mountain, March 14, 2017, ISBN 978-1-6297-2256-6
- Dragonwatch: Wrath of the Dragon King, Shadow Mountain, October 23, 2018, ISBN 978-1-6297-2486-7
- Dragonwatch: Master of the Phantom Isle, Shadow Mountain, October 1, 2019, ISBN 978-1-6297-2604-5
- Dragonwatch: Champion of the Titan Games, Shadow Mountain, October 13, 2020, ISBN 978-1-6297-2788-2
- Dragonwatch: Return of the Dragon Slayers, Shadow Mountain, October 26, 2021, ISBN 978-1-6297-2930-5
- Legend of the Dragon Slayer: The Origin Story of Dragonwatch , Shadow Mountain, May 4, 2021, ISBN 978-1-6297-2849-0

=== Beyonders ===
Beyonders is a series about two teenagers named Jason and Rachel who get summoned as the last chance to save Lyrian, a doomed realm ruled by the wizard Maldor.

- Beyonders: A World Without Heroes, Aladdin, March 15, 2011, ISBN 978-1-41699-792-4
- Beyonders: Seeds of Rebellion, Aladdin, March 13, 2012, ISBN 978-1-41699-794-8
- Beyonders: Chasing the Prophecy, Aladdin, March 12, 2013, ISBN 978-1-41699-796-2

=== Five Kingdoms ===
Five Kingdoms is a series about a 12-year-old boy named Cole who was about to get enslaved by slave traders but at the last moment, he hides while his friends are being sucked away to another world called the Outskirts. Cole decides he should save them and ends up being enslaved as well. In the Outskirts, there are five kingdoms, each with a very different system of magic, that correspond roughly to the five books.

- Five Kingdoms: Sky Raiders, Aladdin, March 11, 2014, ISBN 978-1-4424-9700-9
- Five Kingdoms: Rogue Knight, Aladdin, November 18, 2014, ISBN 978-1-4424-9703-0
- Five Kingdoms: Crystal Keepers, Aladdin, March 17, 2015, ISBN 978-1-4424-9706-1
- Five Kingdoms: Death Weavers, Aladdin, March 15, 2016, ISBN 978-1-4424-9709-2
- Five Kingdoms: Time Jumpers, Aladdin, March 13, 2018, ISBN 978-1-4424-9712-2

=== Candy Shop War ===
Candy Shop War follows Nate in a strange town full of magical candies and crazy arcades.

- The Candy Shop War, Shadow Mountain, September 11, 2007, ISBN 978-1-59038-783-2
- Arcade Catastrophe, Shadow Mountain, October 23, 2012, ISBN 978-1-60907-179-0
- Carnival Quest, Shadow Mountain, March 14, 2023 ISBN 978-1-63993-088-3

=== Pingo ===
- Pingo, illustrated by Brandon Dorman, Shadow Mountain, August 5, 2009, ISBN 978-1-60641-109-4
- Pingo and the Playground Bully – Prequel to Pingo, illustrated by Brandon Dorman, Shadow Mountain, October 9, 2012, ISBN 978-1-60907-178-3

=== Smarter Than A Monster: A Survival Guide ===
Smarter Than A Monster is a picture book aimed at helping kids overcome their fear of monsters by teaching good habits, such as brushing their teeth.

- Smarter Than A Monster: A Survival Guide, illustrated by Mike Walton, Shadow Mountain, October 1, 2019, ISBN 978-1-62972-610-6

=== Spirit Animals ===
Brandon Mull spearheaded a multi-book series called Spirit Animals. Each book is written by a different author but based in the same fantasy world.

- Mull has written one full book in the series: Wild Born (Book 1), and select stories in Special Edition: Tales of the Great Beasts (October 21, 2014) and Special Edition: Tales of the Fallen Beasts (February 23, 2016). Wild Born tells the story of four 11-year-old kids (Conor from Eura, Meilin from Zhong, Rollan from Amaya, and Abeke from Nilo) who summon the legendary Four Fallen (Briggan with Connor, Jhi with Meilin, Essix with Rollan, and Uraza with Abeke). The kids must work together to find the first talisman with the Greencloaks, leading to a heroic battle against the Ravens and the Conquerors. The first Special Edition covers the story of the four great beasts: Briggan the Wolf, Uraza the Leopard, Jhi the Panda, and Essix the Falcon before they sacrifice themselves to protect the land and become the legendary Four Fallen Spirit Animals. The second special edition features the story of the betrayal of the great beast Gerathon.

Mull also contributed to True Heroes: A Treasury of Modern Fairy Tales, a short story anthology inspired by real children with cancer.

Guardians

- Mull has written book 1, the "Forbidden Mountain."

=== Future ===
Mull has recently published book 1 in the "Guardians” series and is working on the later books.
