= Children's fantasy =

Children's literature with fantasy elements

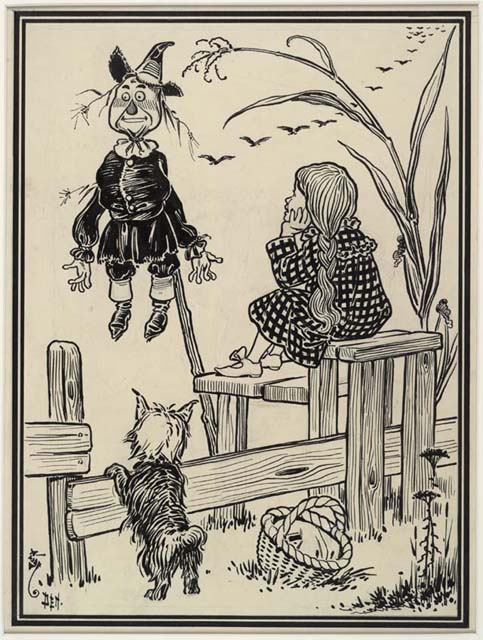
Illustration from first edition of The Wonderful Wizard of Oz

Children's fantasy is a subgenre of fantasy literature intended for young readers. It may also refer to fantasy read by children, regardless of the intended audience.

The genre has roots in folk tales such as Aesop's Fables that were not originally intended for children: before the Victorian era, fairytales were perceived as immoral and ill-suited for children's minds. A market for children's fantasy was established in Britain in the 19th century, leading to works such as Lewis Carroll's Alice's Adventures in Wonderland and Edith Nesbit's Five Children series; the genre also developed in America, exemplified by L. Frank Baum's The Wonderful Wizard of Oz. Of the authors of this period, Nesbit is commonly cited as the creator of modern children's fantasy.

The golden age of children's fantasy, in scholars' view, occurred in the mid-20th century when the genre was influenced by J. R. R. Tolkien's The Hobbit and C. S. Lewis's The Chronicles of Narnia. In the vein of Narnia, the post-war period saw rising stakes and manifestations of evil in the works of Susan Cooper and Alan Garner. Tolkien's Middle-earth led to mythopoeic fantasy in the 1970s, from authors such as Ursula K. Le Guin and Robin McKinley. Another influential writer of this period was Diana Wynne Jones, who wrote both medievalist and realist fantasies.

In the late 1990s, J. K. Rowling's Harry Potter led to a commercial boom in the genre, reviving older authors' careers and spawning many imitators. A concurrent success is Philip Pullman's His Dark Materials, a darker, realistic fantasy that led to a corresponding trend in a new young adult market.

== Children's fantasy books and series ==
The protagonists are usually children or teens who have unique abilities, gifts, possessions or even allies that allow them to face powerful adversaries. Harry Potter is a powerful young wizard, one of the children of The Dark Is Rising series is an immature Old One with magical abilities, and in the His Dark Materials series the children have magical items and animal allies. The plot frequently incorporates a bildungsroman.

In the earlier part of the 20th century, C. S. Lewis noted that fantasy was more accepted in juvenile literature, and therefore a writer interested in fantasy often wrote in it to find an audience.

=== Forerunners ===
- E. T. A. Hoffmann: The Nutcracker and the Mouse King
- Charles Kingsley: The Water-Babies
- George MacDonald: The Princess and the Goblin, The Light Princess, At the Back of the North Wind
- Lewis Carroll: Alice's Adventures in Wonderland, Through the Looking-glass
- Carlo Collodi: The Adventures of Pinocchio
- Kenneth Grahame: The Reluctant Dragon

=== 1900 to 1945 ===
- L. Frank Baum: The Wonderful Wizard of Oz and its many sequels
- Beatrix Potter: The Tale of Peter Rabbit and rest of The 23 Tales
- Kenneth Grahame: The Wind in the Willows
- J.M. Barrie: Peter Pan; or, the Boy Who Wouldn't Grow Up
- E. Nesbit: Five Children and It, The Phoenix and the Carpet, The Story of the Amulet, The Enchanted Castle, The Magic City
- Rudyard Kipling: Puck of Pook's Hill and Rewards and Fairies
- Selma Lagerlöf: The Wonderful Adventures of Nils
- A. A. Milne: Winnie-the-Pooh, The House at Pooh Corner
- Zofia Kossak-Szczucka: The Troubles of a Gnome
- Erich Kästner: The 35th of May, or Conrad's Ride to the South Seas
- P. L. Travers: Mary Poppins series
- J. R. R. Tolkien: The Hobbit
- Enid Blyton: The Faraway Tree series
- Antoine de Saint-Exupéry: The Little Prince
- Mary Norton: The Magic Bed Knob, Bonfires and Broomsticks

=== Post-War and 1950s ===
- Jan Brzechwa: Pan Kleks trilogy
- C. S. Lewis: The Chronicles of Narnia
- Astrid Lindgren: Pippi Longstocking series, Mio, My Son, Karlsson-on-the-Roof series
- Robert A. Heinlein: the Heinlein juveniles, a set of 12 books that includes Starship Troopers
- T. H. White, The Sword in the Stone and Mistress Masham's Repose
- Tove Jansson: the Moomin series
- Mary Norton: The Borrowers series

=== Late 20th Century ===
- Maurice Sendak: Where the Wild Things Are
- Joan Aiken: Wolves Chronicles
- Gerald Durrell: The Talking Parcel
- Astrid Lindgren: Ronia, the Robber's Daughter, The Brothers Lionheart
- Michael Ende: Momo, The Neverending Story
- Susan Cooper: The Dark Is Rising
- Roald Dahl: Charlie and the Chocolate Factory, James and the Giant Peach, Matilda, The BFG and others
- Diana Wynne Jones: The Lives of Christopher Chant, Charmed Life
- Alan Garner: The Weirdstone of Brisingamen, The Owl Service
- Andre Norton: the Witch World series
- Ursula K. Le Guin: A Wizard of Earthsea and its sequels
- Jill Murphy: The Worst Witch series
- Brian Jacques: the Redwall series
- Anne McCaffrey: the Dragonriders of Pern Harper Hall trilogy
- Madeleine L'Engle: the Time Quartet
- Lloyd Alexander: The Chronicles of Prydain
- Chris Van Allsburg: The Garden of Abdul Gasazi, Jumanji and Zathura, The Polar Express
- Dorota Terakowska: Lustro pana Grymsa (The Mirror of mister Gryms), Babci Brygidy szalona podróż po Krakowie (Grandma Brygida’s Mad Journey through Cracow), Władca Lewawu (The Ruler of Lewaw), Córka czarownic (Witches' Daughter), W krainie Kota (In The Land of the Cat), Samotność Bogów (The Loneliness of the Gods), Tam gdzie spadają anioły (Where the Angels Fall)
- Norton Juster: The Phantom Tollbooth
- Shannon Messenger: Keeper of the Lost Cities

=== More recent titles and series ===
- Wes Steenburg: The Magic of the Black Cat
- James Gurney: Dinotopia series
- Philip Pullman: His Dark Materials, Clockwork and The Firework-Maker's Daughter
- J. K. Rowling: Harry Potter
- Eoin Colfer: Artemis Fowl
- Holly Black and Tony DiTerlizzi: The Spiderwick Chronicles
- Cornelia Funke: The Thief Lord, Inkheart series, Dragon Rider
- Mary Pope Osborne: The Magic Tree House series
- Tamora Pierce: The Song of the Lioness, Circle of Magic, and sequels
- Jonathan Stroud: Bartimaeus Sequence and Lockwood & Co.
- Rick Riordan: Camp Half-Blood Chronicles, The Kane Chronicles, and Magnus Chase and the Gods of Asgard
- Christopher Paolini: Eragon
- Angie Sage: Septimus Heap
- Erin Hunter: Warriors, Seekers, and Survivors series
- Brandon Mull: Fablehaven, Beyonders, and Five Kingdoms series
- Jennifer A. Nielsen: The False Prince trilogy
- Chris Colfer: The Land of Stories
- Tui T. Sutherland: Wings of Fire series
- Shannon Hale: The Goose Girl and sequels, Princess Academy

== Sources ==
- Ashley, Mike; Grant, John (1997). "Children's fantasy". In Clute, John; Grant, John (eds.). The Encyclopedia of Fantasy. St. Martin's Griffin.
- Beckett, Sandra L. (2008). Crossover Fiction: Global and Historical Perspectives. Routledge. doi:10.4324/9780203893135. ISBN 978-0-203-89313-5.
- Cecire, Maria Sachiko (2019). Re-Enchanted: The Rise of Children's Fantasy Literature in the Twentieth Century. University of Minnesota Press. ISBN 978-1-4529-5943-6. OCLC 1097419657.
- Levy, Michael; Mendlesohn, Farah (2016). Children's Fantasy Literature: An Introduction. Cambridge University Press. doi:10.1017/cbo9781139087421. ISBN 978-1-139-08742-1.
- Lewis, C. S. (1975). Of Other Worlds: Essays and Stories. Harcourt. ISBN 978-0-15-667897-1. OCLC 1132332944.
- Nikolajeva, Maria (2012). "The development of children's fantasy". In James, Edward; Mendlesohn, Farah (eds.). The Cambridge Companion to Fantasy Literature. Cambridge University Press. pp. 50–61. doi:10.1017/CCOL9780521429597.006. ISBN 978-0-521-42959-7.
- Townsend, John Rowe (2001). "Fantasy". In Watson, Victor (ed.). The Cambridge Guide to Children's Books in English. Cambridge University Press. ISBN 978-0-511-07410-3. OCLC 436845497.
