= Númenor =

Fictional place in J. R. R. Tolkien's writings

- J. R. R. Tolkien's legendarium location
- First appearance: The Lord of the Rings

In-universe information
- Type: Island kingdom
- Location: Island west of Middle-earth
- Fictional era: Second Age
- Founder: Elros Tar-Minyatur

Númenor, also called Elenna-nórë or Westernesse, is a fictional place in J. R. R. Tolkien's writings. It was the kingdom occupying a large island to the west of Middle-earth, the main setting of Tolkien's writings, and was the greatest civilization of Men. However, after centuries of prosperity, many of its inhabitants ceased to worship the One God, Eru Ilúvatar, and they rebelled against the Valar. They invaded Valinor in an erroneous search for immortality, resulting in the destruction of the island and the death of most of its people. Tolkien intended Númenor to allude to the legendary Atlantis. (Note: Carpenter 2023, #131, 154, 156, 227.)

The end of Númenor echoes the Biblical stories of the fall of man and the destruction of Sodom and Gomorrah, and John Milton's Paradise Lost. The tale forms part of the theme of decline and fall in Middle-earth that runs throughout Tolkien's legendarium, ancient Númenor representing a now-mythical age of greatness. Scholars, and Tolkien himself, have noted likenesses between Númenor and ancient civilisations including ancient Egypt, Mesopotamia, Phoenicia, and Carthage. Its language, Adûnaic, was modelled on Semitic languages. Tolkien chose to make the names of its months reflect those of the French Republican calendar, translated into his Elvish languages.

A novel (That Hideous Strength) by Tolkien's friend C. S. Lewis makes reference to a land called Numinor as "the true West". The television series The Lord of the Rings: The Rings of Power is set mainly in the Second Age, with Númenor's port city of Armenelos serving as a central location in the storyline.

== Fictional geography ==
=== Physical geography ===
A Description of the Island of Númenor, published in Unfinished Tales, was supposedly derived from the archives of Gondor. (Note: Tolkien 1980, part 2, ch. 1 "A Description of the Island of Númenor") Númenor was in the Great Sea, closer to Aman in the West than to Middle-earth in the east. (Note: Tolkien 1977, "Akallabêth") In shape it was a star, with five peninsulas extending from the central region, which was around 250 miles (400 km) across. Karen Wynn Fonstad estimated the island to be 167,691 square miles [435,017 km^{2}] in area. Númenor had six main regions: the five promontories, named Andustar, Hyarnustar, Hyarrostar, Orrostar, and Forostar; and the central area, Mittalmar, which contained the capital city Armenelos. (Note: Tolkien 1996, "The History of the Akallabêth") (Note: Tolkien 1980, part 2, III, "The Line of Elros".) The fifth king Tar-Meneldur built a tower in Forostar to watch the stars. (Note: Tolkien 1980, part 2, ch. 2 "Aldarion and Erendis")

=== Human geography ===
A tall tower was constructed in Armenelos by the first king Elros, son of the seafaring hero Eärendil; the White Tree Nimloth, living symbol of the Kingdom, was planted in the days of the sixth King, the explorer Tar-Aldarion. During the reign of the last King, the proud Ar-Pharazôn, a giant circular temple to Morgoth was built in the city, over five hundred feet in diameter and as much in height to its cornice line, with a silver dome above that. The dome had an oculus, from which the smoke of numerous burned sacrifices rose, tarnishing the silver. Andúnië, "Sunset", was a western port, facing the Undying Lands; the Eldar used to land there. Valandil was the first Lord of Andúnië; Amandil, father of Elendil was the last. Other ports included Rómenna and Eldalondë. As the Shadow fell over Númenor, Armenelos overtook Andúnië.

=== Culture ===
The Númenóreans were descended from the Edain of Beleriand, with three clans: the people of Hador, the people of Bëor, and the Folk of Haleth, also known as the Haladin. Most descended from the fair-haired and blue-eyed people of Hador. The settlers of the western regions, especially Andustar, came mostly from the people of Bëor, with darker hair and grey eyes. A few remnants of the Folk of Haleth and a few families of the Drúedain were also present. (Note: Tolkien 1980, "The Drúedain", note 7.) The average Númenórean was taller than two rangar, or 6'4". (Note: Tolkien 1980, "The Disaster of the Gladden Fields", "Appendix: Númenórean Linear Measures") Númenóreans not of the Line of Elros lived for 200 years, with royal kindred living much longer; their lifespan diminished due to their rebellion. (Note: Tolkien 1980, "The Line of Elros: Kings of Númenor") Coming-of-age was at 25 years.

Their common language, Adûnaic, was derived from Taliska, the speech of the Hadorians. (Note: Tolkien 1977, ch. 18 "Of the Coming of Men into the West") (Note: Tolkien 1996, "The Problem of Ros", p. 368 and note 5.) Most Númenóreans knew Sindarin; noble families also knew the High-elven Quenya, employing it in works of lore and nomenclature. (Note: Tolkien 1996, "Of Dwarves and Men" note 71, pp. 329–330.) When the friendship with the Elves was broken, usage of Sindarin and Quenya lessened, until King Ar-Adûnakhôr forbade their teaching, and knowledge of the elven tongues was only preserved by the Faithful.

Before the coming of the Shadow, the Númenóreans maintained traditions of worship of Ilúvatar and respect to the Valar. Among these were the setting a bough of the fragrant oiolairë upon the prow of a departing ship, the ceremonies concerned with the passing of the Sceptre, and laying down one's life. The most famous traditions were the Three Prayers, during which the people climbed to the summit of Meneltarma and the King praised Eru Ilúvatar. These were the spring prayer for a good year, Erukyermë; the midsummer prayer for a good harvest, Erulaitalë; and the autumn harvest thanksgiving, Eruhantalë.

The Númenórean calendar, the "King's Reckoning", is similar to the Gregorian, with a week of seven days, a year of 365 days except in leap years, and twelve months (astar): ten with 30 days and two with 31. (Note: Tolkien 1955 Appendix D)

== Fictional history ==
=== Land of gift ===
Númenor was raised from the sea as a gift from the Valar to the Edain who had stood with the Elves of Beleriand against Morgoth in the wars of the First Age. (Note: Tolkien 1980: Part Two, II Aldarion and Erendis, "The Further Course of the Narrative") Early in the Second Age, most Edain who had survived the wars left Middle-earth for Númenor, sailing in ships provided and steered by the Elves. The migration took 50 years and brought 5,000 to 10,000 people to the island. (Note: Tolkien 1996, p.145.) Elros Half-elven, son of Eärendil, gave up his immortality to become a Man and the first King of Númenor. The Númenóreans became a powerful people, friendly with Elves, both of Eressëa and of Middle-earth. The Elves of Eressëa brought gifts including skills and plants. Elros brought a measure of Elvish blood and magical power. Among these gifts were seven palantíri, magical orbs that could foresee the future, for the Lords of Andúnië.

=== Sea-kings ===
Númenor was surrounded by the Great Sea of Arda, and the sea had a profound influence on Númenor's culture and history. From the earliest times in its history, fish from the sea were a significant part of Númenórean diet; those providing this food were Númenor's first sea-farers. The Númenóreans swiftly became skilled shipbuilders and mariners, with a desire to explore and master the ocean. There was one limitation on this activity: the Ban of the Valar. The Valar prohibited the Edain from sailing west out of sight of the island. This was because the Undying Lands, forbidden to mortals, lay tantalizingly close to the west of Númenor. So the Númenóreans explored the other seas. They reached Middle-earth to the east, and explored its coasts including the Eastern Sea on the far side of Middle-earth. They brought their civilization to the Men of Middle-earth, who called them the Sea-kings. News of Númenórean seafarers spread far inland in Middle-earth; even the reclusive Ents heard of the coming of "the Great Ships". (Note: Tolkien 1954, book 3, ch. 4 "Treebeard") Númenóreans had established good relations with Gil-galad, the king of the High Elves of the northwest of Middle-earth, whose ships sailed from the Grey Havens. Aldarion founded the Uinendili, a guild of sea-farers, in honour of Uinen, goddess of the Sea. He succeeded to the throne and became known as the Mariner-king. He established Vinyalondë (later called Lond Daer), the first Númenórean settlement in Middle-earth. This port provided access to the great forests of Eriador, which the Númenóreans needed for shipbuilding. The Númenóreans assisted Gil-galad in Middle-earth's War of the Elves and Sauron, which broke out after the forging of the One Ring. Tar-Minastir, later the eleventh King of Númenor, assembled an armada, and sent it to Gil-galad's aid. The forces of Númenor and the Elves defeated Sauron.

=== The Shadow looms ===
The increasing power of the Númenóreans had a dark side: the exploitation of Middle-earth's forests devastated much of Eriador. The Númenóreans established further settlements in Middle-earth, coming to rule a coastal empire with no rival. At first, they engaged with the Men of Middle-earth in a friendly manner, but Minastir's successors, Tar-Ciryatan and Tar-Atanamir "the Great", became tyrannical, oppressing the Men of Middle-earth and exacting heavy tribute. The Númenóreans made Umbar, the harbour city in the south of Middle-earth, into a great fortress and expanded Pelargir, a landing in Gondor near the Mouths of the Anduin. The "King's Men" among the Númenóreans became jealous of Elves for their immortality, resenting the Ban of the Valar, and sought everlasting life. Those who remained loyal to the Valar and friendly to the Elves (and using Elvish languages) were the "Faithful" or "Elf-friends" (Elendili); they were led by the Lords of Andúnië. In the reign of Tar-Ancalimon (S.A. 2221-2386), the King's Men became dominant, and the Faithful became a persecuted minority accused of being "spies of the Valar".

=== Sauron ===
Late in the Second Age, Ar-Pharazôn, the 25th monarch of Númenor, sailed to Middle-earth to challenge Sauron, (Note: Tolkien 1992, pp. 250, 284, 437) who had claimed to be the King of Men and overlord of Middle-earth. Ar-Pharazôn landed at Umbar to do battle, and upon seeing the might of Númenor, Sauron's armies fled, forcing Sauron to surrender without a fight. He was brought back to Númenor as a prisoner, but soon seduced the king and many other Númenóreans, promising them eternal life if they worshipped his master Melkor. With Sauron as his advisor, Ar-Pharazôn had a 500-foot (150 m) tall temple erected in Armenelos. In this temple human sacrifices were offered to Melkor. The White Tree Nimloth, which stood before the King's House in Armenelos and whose fate was tied to the line of kings, was cut down and burned as a sacrifice to Melkor, at Sauron's direction. Isildur rescued a fruit of the tree; it became an ancestor of the White Tree of Gondor.

=== Cataclysm ===
The Downfall of Númenor and the Changing of the World. The outlines of the continents are purely schematic.

Prompted by Sauron and fearing old age and death, Ar-Pharazôn built a great armada and sailed into the West to make war upon the Valar, intending to seize the Undying Lands of Valinor and achieve immortality. Sauron remained behind. Ar-Pharazôn landed on the shores of Aman. As the Valar were forbidden to take direct action against Men, Manwë, chief of the Valar, called upon Eru Ilúvatar, the One God. In response, Eru caused the Changing of the World: the hitherto flat world of Arda was transformed into a globe, Númenor sank beneath the ocean, and the Undying Lands were removed from the Earth forever. Only the Elves could continue to sail the Old Straight Road, which now meant travelling out of Arda. All the people on the island were drowned; only the Faithful, who had already sailed away, survived. Most of Ar-Pharazôn's armada met its doom in the cataclysm.

Sauron himself was caught in the cataclysm he had helped bring about. His body was destroyed, and he never again had a fair form. He fled back to Middle-earth as a monstrous spirit of hatred that "passed as a shadow and a black wind over the sea", and returned to Mordor.

=== Aftermath ===
The Faithful, led by the nobleman Elendil, had come to Middle-earth. Elendil's sons, Isildur and Anárion, founded the two Kingdoms in Exile: Arnor in the north, and Gondor in the south. The two kingdoms attempted to maintain Númenórean culture. Gondor flourished, and "for a while its splendour grew, recalling somewhat of the might of Númenor". (Note: Tolkien 1954a, book 2, ch. 2 "The Council of Elrond") Sauron gathered strength in Mordor, setting the scene for a struggle lasting thousands of years.

Other Númenóreans survived in Middle-Earth. These were called Black Númenóreans since they worshipped the Darkness and were "enamoured of evil knowledge". (Note: Tolkien 1955, book 5, ch. 10 "The Black Gate Opens")

== Analysis ==
Originally intended to be a part of a time-travel story in The Notion Club Papers, Tolkien once saw the tale of the fall of Númenor as a conclusion to his The Silmarillion and the "last tale" about the Elder Days. Later, with the emergence of The Lord of the Rings, it became the link back to his mythology of earlier ages. (Note: Tolkien 1987, "The early history of the legend".)

=== Lyonesse ===
Númenor first appears in The Lord of the Rings, as the vague land of "Westernesse", an advanced civilisation which had existed long ago, far to the west over the Sea, and the ancestral home of the Dúnedain. Tolkien chose the name for its resonance with "Lyonesse", a faraway land that sank into the sea in the Middle English romance King Horn. (Note: Tolkien, J. R. R., "Nomenclature of The Lord of the Rings" in Hammond & Scull 2005) (Note: Carpenter 2023, #276 to Dick Plotz, 'Thain' of the Tolkien Society of America, 12 September 1965)

=== Atlantis ===
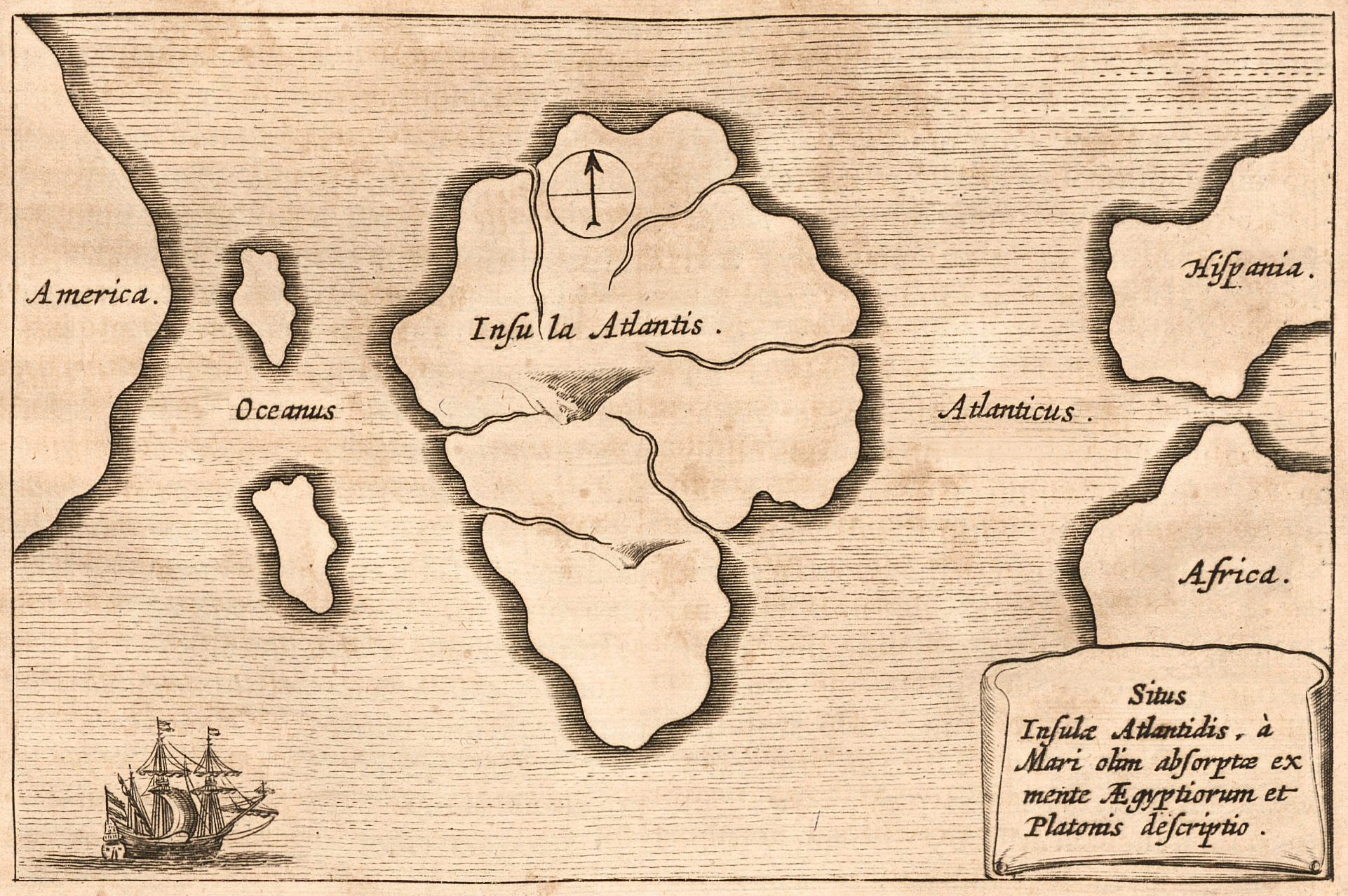
Tolkien wrote of Númenor as Atlantis in several of his letters. Athanasius Kircher's map (inverted to show North at top) of Atlantis between America and Europe ("Hispania", Spain), 1669

Atlantis (Ancient Greek: Ἀτλαντὶς νῆσος, lit. 'island of Atlas') is a fictional island mentioned within an allegory on the hubris (excessive pride leading to a downfall) of nations in the ancient Greek philosopher Plato's works Timaeus and Critias.

According to Tolkien in a letter from 1968, he had written the story of Númenor as "a new version of the Atlantis legend" as a result from a challenge by C. S. Lewis to write a time-travel story. Tolkien himself had recurring dreams of an "ineluctable Wave" from the quiet sea or towering over the green inlands throughout his life.

Tolkien's history of the Downfall of Númenor therefore remained faithful to Plato's story of Atlantis, and exhibits significant influences from Timaeus and Critias. Similarly to how Plato invented a tradition through which the story of Atlantis was allegedly handed down from Egyptian priests to Solon and members of the family of Critias, Tolkien created one in the form of the figure of Ælfwine who met the Elves who had preserved ancient lost knowledge.

Tolkien had his character Lowdham in The Notion Club Papers describe Númenor's name Atalante as an "Avallonian," that is Elvish, word. In this, Tolkien emulated how Plato rearticulated the origin of the name of Atlantis as being derived from its first high king, Atlas, although its name was in fact a reference to the Titan Atlas who held the sky on his shoulders outside of the Pillars of Herakles, as well as Plato's rearticulation of the origin of the name of the city of Gadira as being derived from Atlas's twin brother Gadiros despite the fictional king's name being in reality a reference to the city.

Similarly to how Plato internally claimed in his text that his account of Atlantis represented the truth behind the confused words of the Egyptian priests, Tolkien himself also described his story of Númenor as being the truth behind Plato's own account, and he had Lowdham in The Notion Club Papers claim that if Atlantis referred to Atlas, then it would connect the story with a "mountain regarded as the Pillar of Heaven," that is Mount Atlas, which would in turn refer to Mount Meneltarma in Númenor.

The destruction of Númenor earned it the Quenya name Atalantë, lit. 'the Downfallen'; (Note: The Adûnaic word for Atalantë is Akallabêth, the name of the story of the Downfall. (Note: Tolkien 1987, "The Etymologies")) Tolkien described his invention of this additional allusion to Atlantis as a happy accident when he realized that the Quenya root talat- "to fall" could be incorporated into a name for Númenor. (Note: Carpenter 2023, #257 to Christopher Bretherton, 16 July 1964) Tolkien wrote of Númenor as Atlantis in several of his letters.

The commentator Charles Delattre has noted that Númenor matches the myth of Atlantis, the only drowned island in surviving ancient literature, in multiple details:

- it began as a perfect world, geometrically laid out to reflect its balance and harmony;
- it abounds in valuable minerals; and it has unmatched power, with a strong fleet able to project control far beyond its shores, like ancient Athens;
- Númenor's pride, too, writes Delattre, matches the hubris of Plato's Atlantis;
- and its downfall recalls the destruction of Atlantis, the divine Old Testament retribution on Sodom and Gomorrah, and Milton's Paradise Lost.

=== Fall of man ===
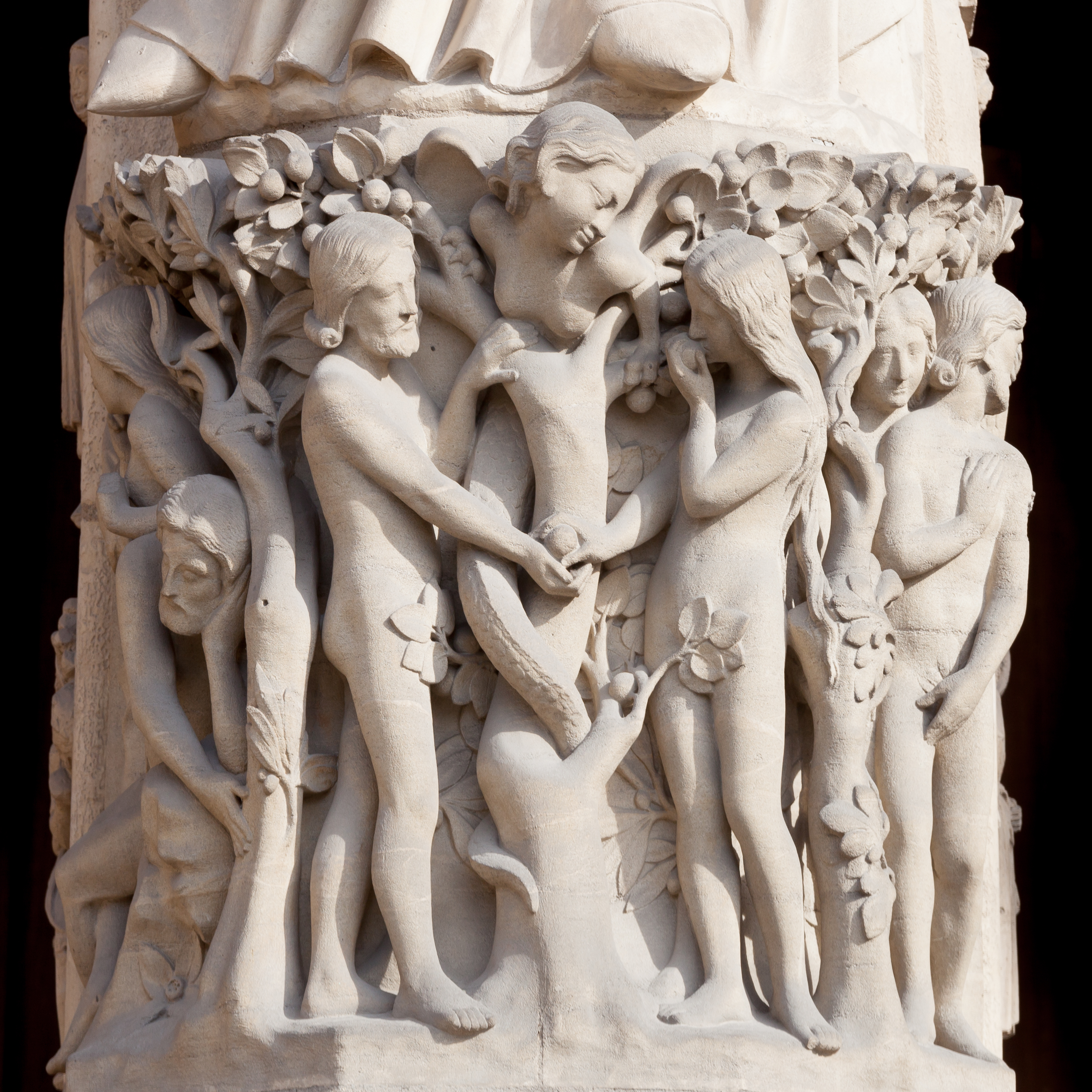
The downfall of Númenor has been compared to the Biblical fall of man. The serpent tempts Adam and Eve to eat the forbidden fruit, Notre Dame de Paris.

Tolkien, a devout Roman Catholic, stated that The Downfall of Númenor (Akallabêth) was effectively a second fall of man, with "its central theme .. (inevitably, I think, in a story of Men) a Ban, or Prohibition". (Note: Carpenter 2023, #131 to Milton Waldman, c. 1951) Bradley J. Birzer, writing in the J.R.R. Tolkien Encyclopedia, notes that Tolkien thought that every story was essentially about a fall, and accordingly his legendarium contains many "falls": that of Morgoth, of Fëanor and his relatives, and that of Númenor among them. Eric Schweicher writes in Mythlore that the ban was "soon defied", as in the Biblical fall. The temptation for the Númenoreans was the desire for immortality, and the ban that they broke was not to sail towards the Undying Lands of Aman. (Note: The Biblical temptation before the fall was the desire for knowledge of good and evil, and the prohibition that was broken was eating the fruit of the tree of that knowledge.)

=== Decline and fall ===
The names connected by his philological studies formed for Tolkien the possibility of an inexorable downward progression, from the long-lost mythical world of Númenor in the Second Age, to his fantasy world of Middle-earth in the Third Age, also now lost, to the real ancient Germanic and Anglo-Saxon thousands of years later, and finally down to the modern world, where names like Edwin still survive, all (in the fiction) that is left of Middle-earth, carrying for the knowledgeable philologist a hint of a rich living English mythology. Shippey notes that in Númenor, the myth would have been still stronger, as being an Elf-friend, one of the hated Elendili, marked a person out to the King's Men faction as a target for human sacrifice to Morgoth. Tolkien's "continuous playing with names" led to characters and situations, and sometimes to stories.

Delattre states that the position of Númenor in Tolkien's Middle-earth is curious, being "at once marginal and central", not least because in The Lord of the Rings, the glory of Númenor is already ancient history, evoking a sense of loss and nostalgia. This, he writes, is just one of many losses and downfalls in Tolkien's legendarium, leading finally to the last remnants of Númenor in the North, the Dúnedain, and the last Númenorean kingdom, Gondor, which "keeps alive the illusion that Númenor still exists in the South".

Marjorie Burns writes that the feeling of "inevitable disintegration" is borrowed from the Nordic world view, which emphasises that all may be lost at any moment. She writes that in Norse mythology, this began during the creation: in the realm of fire, Muspell, the jötunn Surt was even then awaiting the end of the world. Burns comments that in that mythology, even the gods can die, everything has an end, and that, "though [the evil] Sauron may go, the elves will fade as well."

=== Historical ===
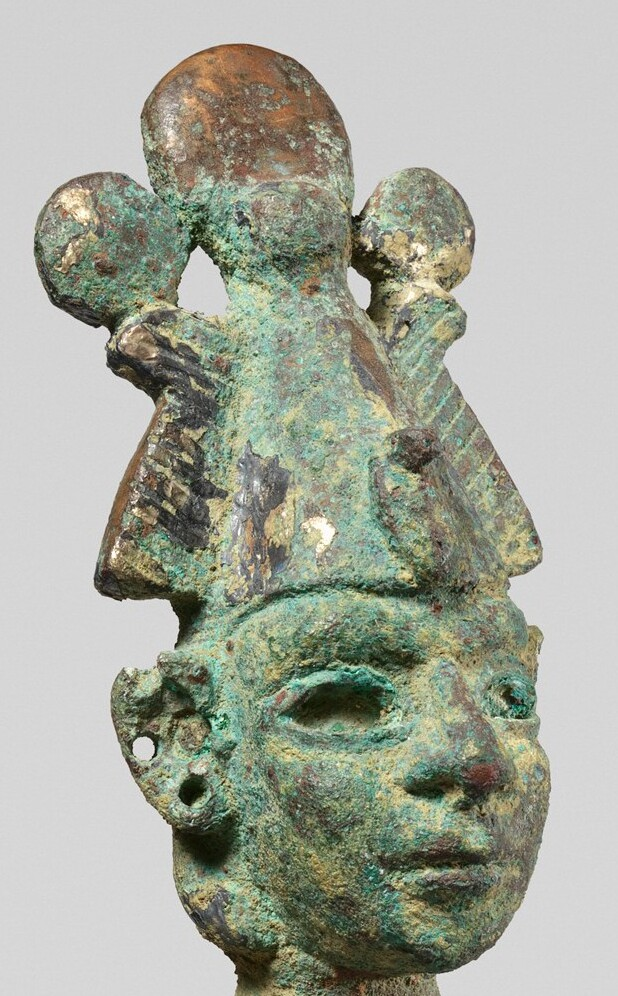
Tolkien likened the winged crown of Gondor to the Egyptian winged atef crown.

Tolkien described the later Númenóreans of Gondor as "best pictured in (say) Egyptian terms", resembling ancient Egyptians in their love of and power to build large monuments, and in their interest in ancestry and tombs. The crown of Gondor was tall and winged, like an ancient Egyptian atef crown. Adûnaic was modelled on Semitic languages: Tolkien described it as having Semitic-like triconsonantal roots and an affinity with the Dwarvish language Khuzdul, itself modelled after Semitic languages. Some Mesopotamian influences were present in early versions of Númenor, such as Sauron's name Zigûr and Tar-Miriel's name, Istar. Tolkien compared the Númenóreans to the Jews in two of his letters. He equated the Númenórean practice of having just one place of worship at the summit of Mount Meneltarma with that of the Jews at their single Temple in Jerusalem. Númenor has parallels with ancient Phoenicia and Carthage, being militarily powerful at sea, and worshipping a god with human sacrifice.

=== Philology and time-travel ===
Tolkien was a professional philologist. For him, the existence of ideas embodied in ancient words and names indicated that there must have been "some original conception", a once-living tradition, behind those ideas. The Tolkien scholar Tom Shippey notes that in Tolkien's The Lost Road, the key names are from Germanic mythology, and they speak of elves:

Germanic	Old English	Meaning	Modern name	In Númenor
Alboin	Ælfwine	Elf-friend	Alwin, Elwin, Aldwin	Elendil
Audoin	Eadwine	Bliss-friend	Edwin	Herendil
—	Oswine	God-friend	Oswin, cf. Oswald	Valandil ("Valar-friend")

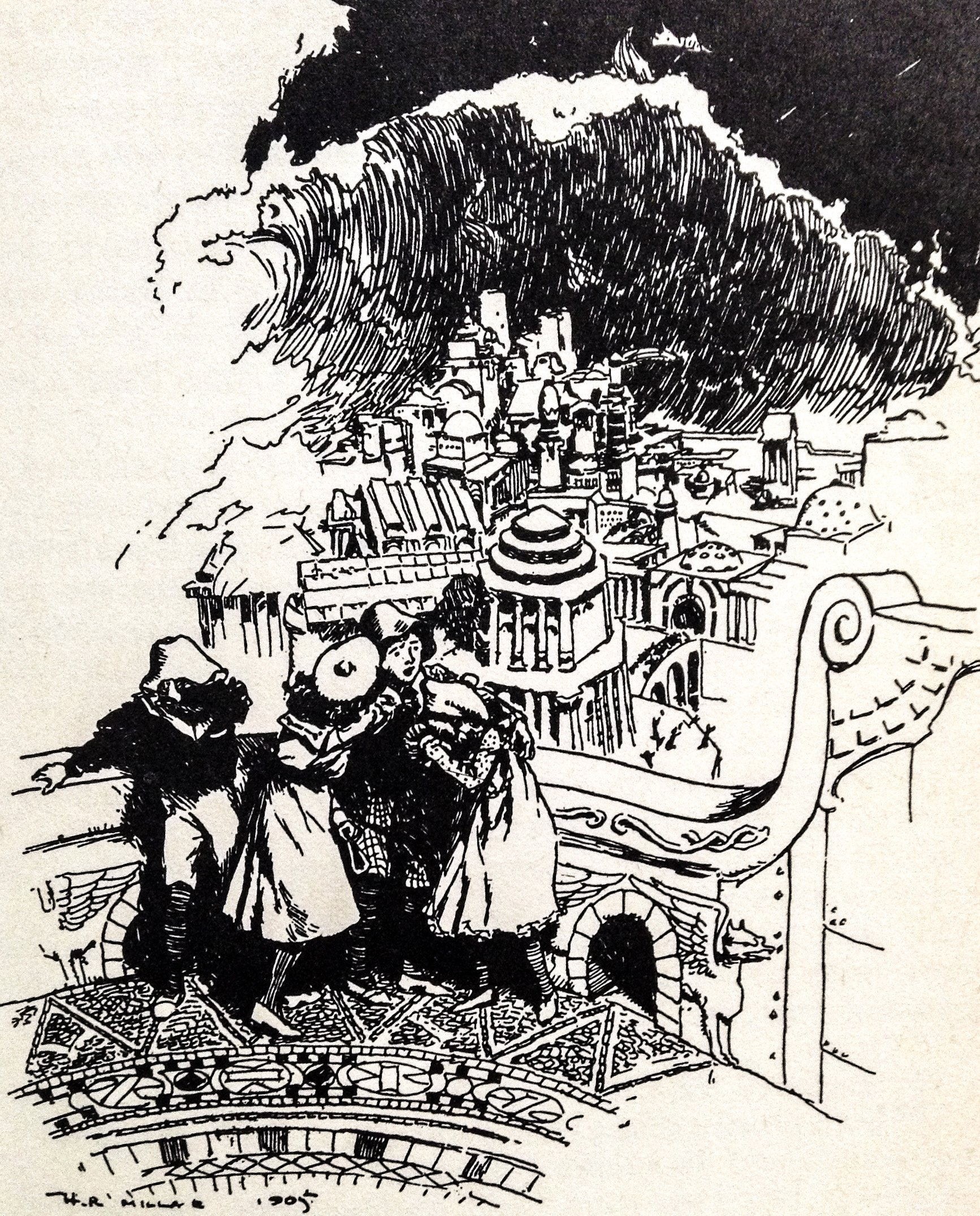
"The Atlantis Wave" by H. R. Millar in The Story of the Amulet by E. Nesbit, 1908

Both the use of a pair of related time-travellers with Old English names, and the idea of visiting Atlantis at the time of its destruction, echo events in children's books by Edith Nesbit, who Tolkien described as "an author I delight in". Nesbit's 1906 The Story of the Amulet has Atlantis destroyed by a combination of volcanic eruption and a tsunami. Kullmann and Siepmann comment that the tsunami must have resonated with Tolkien's recurring "Atlantis complex" dream, ascribed also to the Tolkien-figure of Faramir, of a great wave that rushes in over the treetops. Nesbit's 1908 The House of Arden has as its central device a brother and sister named Edred ("Bliss-counsel") and Elfrida ("Elf-strength") who visit several earlier times, always meeting a similar pair of characters.

=== Origins of the calendar ===
Tolkien chose to calque the calendar of Númenor on the French Republican calendar. For example, the names of the third month of Winter, Súlímë, Gwaeron, and Ventôse, all mean 'Windy'.

Quenya	Sindarin	Meaning	French Republican	Fr. Rep. meaning
Narvinyë	Narwain	new sun (Note: Salo 2004, Appendix 6)	Nivôse	snowy
Nénimë	Nínui	watery	Pluviôse	rainy
Súlimë	Gwaeron	windy / wind month (Note: Tolkien 1977, Appendix, s.v. sul)	Ventôse	windy
Víressë	Gwirith	new / young / budding?	Germinal	budding
Lótessë	Lothron	flower month	Floréal	flowery
Nárië	Nórui	sunny	Prairial	grassy
Cermië	Cerveth	harvest	Messidor	(wheat) harvest
Urimë	Urui	hot (Note: Tolkien 1977, Appendix, s.v. ur)	Thermidor	hot
Yavannië	Ivanneth	fruit giving	Fructidor	fruit
Narquelië	Narbeleth	sun-fading (Note: Tolkien 1984, "Cottage of Lost Play", p. 41 footnote)	Vendémiaire	wine harvest
Hísimë	Hithui	misty (Note: Tolkien 1977, Appendix, s.v. hith)	Brumaire	misty, foggy
Ringarë	Girithron	cold / shivering month	Frimaire	cold, frosty

== Adaptations ==
"Looming marble structures": the port city of Armenelos in Númenor in The Lord of the Rings: The Rings of Power, as envisaged by production designer Ramsey Avery

C. S. Lewis's 1945 novel That Hideous Strength makes reference to Numinor, as "the true West", which Lewis credits as a then-unpublished creation of J. R. R. Tolkien; they were friends and colleagues at Oxford University, and members of The Inklings literary discussion group. The misspelling came from Lewis's only hearing Tolkien say the name in one of his readings.

The television series The Lord of the Rings: The Rings of Power is set mainly in the Second Age. It includes the port city of Armenelos in Númenor, its architecture designed to convey the character of its people. The set is described as "an entire seaside city" with buildings, alleyways, shrines, graffiti, and a ship docked at the harbour. The production designer Ramsey Avery based Númenor's "looming marble structures" on Ancient Greece and Venice, while he used the colour blue to reflect the culture's emphasis on water and sailing.

== See also ==
- Charn
