= The Magic World =

Short story collection by E. Nesbit

First edition; H. R. Millar illustration of "Kenneth and the Carp", 1909

The Magic World is a collection of twelve short stories by E. Nesbit. It was first published in book form in 1912 by Macmillan and Co. Ltd., with illustrations by H. R. Millar and Gerald Spencer Pryse. The stories, previously printed in magazines such as Blackie's Children's Annual, are typical of Nesbit's arch, ironic, clever fantasies for children.

The twelve stories:

- "The Cat-hood of Maurice" — a boy abuses the family cat, and learns to see things from the feline point of view.
- "The Mixed Mine" — two boys find a magic spyglass, and use it to make their fortunes.
- "Accidental Magic" — Quentin falls asleep on the altarstone at Stonehenge, and wakes in Atlantis.
- "The Princess and the Hedge-pig" — King Ozymandias and Queen Eliza plan a secret christening for their Princess Ozyliza, to avoid a wicked fairy's curse. Things go awry.
- "Septimus Septimusson" — he is the seventh son of a seventh son, who can see fairies and hear the beasts speak; and he must seek his fortune.
- "The White Cat" — a boy finds a china ornament in the attic; it proves to be a magic talisman.
- "Belinda and Bellamant" — they are a princess and prince suffering curses; a talking bat helps resolve their problems.
- "Justnowland" — Elsie visits a magic land of giant crows, and a dragon.
- "The Related Muff" — a sensitive boy, dismissed as a "muff" by his cousins, proves himself a hero in a crisis.
- "The Aunt and Amabel" — a girl enters a magic world through a wardrobe.
- "Kenneth and the Carp" — unjustly accused, a boy transforms into a fish and redeems his honor.
- "The Magician's Heart" — an evil magician distributes curses at royal christenings. Complications ensue.

"The Aunt and Amabel" has received attention as a precursor of C. S. Lewis's first Narnia novel, The Lion, the Witch, and the Wardrobe (1950). "Accidental Magic" has been seen as exerting an influence on J. R. R. Tolkien. Conversely, Nesbit's "Justnowland" displays the influence of Lewis Carroll's 1865 novel Alice in Wonderland.

Elisabeth Beresford's 1964 book Awkward Magic was published in the United States under the title The Magic World. Beresford has been identified as an imitator of Nesbit.

Nesbit's little girls tend to get in trouble over their efforts at gardening. Elsie in "Justnowland" uproots turnip plants she mistakes for weeds; Amabel cuts chrysanthemum blossoms from a greenhouse and tries to plant them in a flower bed. Stories in the collection feature talking animals and human/animal transformation, with implications regarding animal welfare and avoidance of mistreatment. The opening story is the most explicit in its message against cruelty to animals.

== Selected quotes ==
- Dr Strongitharm's was a school for "backward and difficult boys." Need I say more? — "The Cat-hood of Maurice"
- There is no moral to this story, except...But no – there is no moral. — "The Mixed Mine"
- But it's no good. King's sons aren't what they used to be. A silly lot they are nowadays, all taken up with football and cricket and golf. — "Septimus Septimusson"
- And Sep and his dear Princess are as happy as they deserve to be. Some people say we are all as happy as we deserve to be – but I am not sure. — "Septimus Septimusson"
- There is nothing more luxurious than eating while you read – unless it be reading while you eat. Amabel did both: they are not the same thing, as you will see if you think the matter over. — "The Aunt and Amabel"
- We are The People who Understand. And now you are one of Us. — "The Aunt and Amabel"
- And the house was surrounded by a real deep moat, with clear water in it, and long weeds and water-lilies and fish – the gold and the silver and the everyday kinds. — "Kenneth and the Carp"
- And so the story ends with love and a wedding, and showers of white roses. — "The Magician's Heart"
