= Four Children and It =

2012 novel by Jacqueline Wilson

- Author: Jacqueline Wilson
- Illustrator: Nick Sharratt
- Cover artist: Nick Sharratt
- Publisher: Puffin Books
- Publication date: 16 August 2012 (hardcover) 9 May 2013 (paperback)
- Pages: 310pp (1st edition hardback)
- ISBN: 978-0-141-34142-2
- Preceded by: The Worst Thing About My Sister
- Followed by: Queenie

Four Children and It is a 2012 children's book by author Jacqueline Wilson. It is a contemporary response to the classic 1902 book Five Children and It by E. Nesbit.

== Plot ==
Rosalind and Robbie are staying with their father, David, his wife, Alice, and their half sister, Maudie whilst their mother is on an Open University course. Also staying with David and Alice is Alice's daughter Smash (Samantha), whose father is on a honeymoon in the Seychelles.

In an attempt to bring the family closer together David takes them on a picnic to Oxshott Woods. Smash and Rosalind climb trees as part of a dare, however, Robbie struggles to climb the tree much to Smash's amusement. Whilst there the children explore the sandpit and when digging they discover the Psammead which Rosalind recognises from her book Five Children and It. Robbie wishes to be good at climbing trees. The Psammead grants the wish and David takes an interest, claiming that Robbie would be an amazing gymnast. Not realising that the wishes only lasted until sunset Robbie continues to show off his skills. David phones his friend, Tim, who is a P.E. teacher and runs summer classes. The next day David, Rosalind, Robbie and Smash go to the gym where Tim works. Robbie struggles and embarrasses himself and David. However, Tim takes an interest in Smash.

The next day, the children beg to go back to Oxshott Woods. Smash wishes to be rich and famous and soon after they are taken away by their bodyguard, Bulldog, and meet their PA, Naomi. They travel into London and have a trip around Harrods. Rosalind is a famous writer and attends a book signing. Robbie has his own cookery show, Maudie, a star of "The Doodle Family" as Polly Doodle appears on the Start-At-Six-Show. Smash is a famous singer and in the middle of her concert in the O2 Arena when the wish ends, and the children are left alone. They venture through London guided by Smash, and when they return they are banned from going to Oxshott Woods.

The next day the children (excluding Maudie) are grounded, and in an attempt to reconcile the three of them write letters apologising. Smash returns to her contemptuous attitude towards Rosalind and Robbie and calls Rosalind's letter "loathsome grovelling". After Smash prompts Maudie she manages to convince Alice and David to return to Oxshott Woods. In anger Smash wishes (accidentally) that David never met Alice, and David and Maudie start to disappear. The Psammead undoes the wish and Rosalind wishes that part of the wish that Alice and David never see anything magical but her main wish is to meet the children from Five Children and It.

The children meet Cyril, Anthea, Jane and Robert. They invite Rosalind, Robbie, Smash and Maudie to play in their nursery. The five children decide that their wish will be to go visit the future. Rosalind accidentally wishes that she could live in the Edwardian Era forever. In reality she gets arrested and is sent to a workhouse. Smash wishes Rosalind back after she doesn't return at sunset. The following day David and Alice take the children to go see Smash's favourite author Marvel O'Kaye.

The day after they go to Oxshott Woods in the afternoon after it started raining. Maudie wishes that the people from the various nursery rhymes, the characters of Jack and Jill; Polly and Sukey; Ring Around the Rosie and the Cat, the Cow, the Dog, the Dish and the Spoon would come to life, but they continue to ignore the children until sunset. With Robbie's second wish he wishes that his toy animals came alive. Smash's second wish is that they can fly, so the children grow wings and they enjoy flying around until it rains. Rosalind chooses the final wish before they go home and she wishes for their heart's desire. When they return home David comes back with some things; a hamster for Robbie, a gymnastics leotard for Smash, a notebook for Rosalind, and Maudie receives a story book with all the characters she wished for. The children realise that their presents were their heart's desire: Robbie a pet; Smash to receive attention and Rosalind to keep writing stories. Maudie says that she wanted to see the Psammead again. Rosalind begins writing the story of their holidays together.

== Characters ==
- Rosalind Hartlepool: The narrator and likes reading classic novels. Eleven years old, she is the oldest of the children.
- Samantha "Smash": Alice's 10-year-old daughter from a previous marriage. Smash longs to get attention so misbehaves.
- Robert "Robbie" Hartlepool: Rosalind's 8-year-old brother who loves animals.
- Maudie Hartlepool: David and Alice's three-year-old daughter who is little and cute, and is keen on the Psammead whom she calls monkey.
- David Hartlepool: The father of Rosalind, Robbie and Maudie, and the stepfather of Smash.
- Alice Hartlepool: The mother of Smash and Maudie, and the stepmother of Rosalind and Robbie.
- The Psammead: A wish-granting creature who, a character from Five Children and It.
- Cyril, Jane, Anthea, Robert, and the Lamb: The Five children from Five Children and It.
- Naomi: The children's personal assistant in Smash's first wish.
- Bob: The smiley chauffeur in Smash's first wish.
- Bridget: Alice's charwoman, who comes once a week to clean her house.
- Tim: The Gym coach

== Reception ==
A review in The Times Educational Supplement examined similarities and contrasts between the 21st-century children depicted by Jacqueline Wilson and the early 20th-century children described by E. Nesbit. The modern Four Children are "accompanied by their parents on every trip to the woods", and when they meet their Edwardian counterparts, "marvel at their...freedom to road the countryside at will".

Several reviewers including The School Librarian found that the book's strength was its realistic depiction of tensions in a somewhat dysfunctional blended family. TES noted that while the modern children's "scrapes and misadventures are rarely as dramatic as their predecessors", they "are also dealing with the everyday drama of a fractured family" where "the real emotion of the novel lies."

== Film adaptation ==
A feature film directed by Andy De Emmony and produced for Sky Cinema, titled Four Kids and It, was released in April 2020.
