= The Liar (musical) =

- Sheet music
- Music: John Mundy
- Lyrics: Edward Eager
- Book: Alfred Drake and Edward Eager
- Premiere: Original Broadway Production

The Liar is a musical comedy in two acts with a book by Alfred Drake and Edward Eager, music by John Mundy and lyrics by Mr. Eager. It was produced on Broadway in 1950.

== Production ==
After a try-out at the Forrest Theatre in Philadelphia for two weeks beginning Monday, April 24, 1950, The Liar premiered on Broadway at Broadhurst Theatre on May 18, 1950, and closed on May 27, 1950, after only 12 performances. It was produced by Dorothy Willard and Thomas Hammond. The production was directed by Drake, with choreography by Hanya Holm. The scenic and lighting design was by Donald Oenslager, costume design by Motley, and orchestration by Lehman Engel and Ben Ludlow. Mr. Engel was also the musical director.

The opening night cast starred Martin Balsam as Servingman and Walter Matthau, as Guard. The cast included Melville Cooper, Paula Laurence, and Philip Coolidge.

== Synopsis ==
Title character Lelio can't stop lying and can't stop chasing the ladies, including the two daughters of Doctor Balanzoni who are respectively and romantically involved with Florindo and Octavio. Moreover, Lelio's servant Arlecchino becomes interested in Columbina, although she too is involved with another. But the romantic misadventures are resolved when it is revealed that Lelio is already married to Cleonice. So Lelio, Cleonice, and Arlecchino head for home, and the various Venetian couples pairing up without interference from Lelio and Arlecchino.

== Songs ==
Act 1

- “March of the Guards”
- “The Ladies’ Opinion”
- “You’ve Stolen My Heart”
- “The Liar’s Song”
- “Starting at the Bottom”
- “Supper Trio”
- “Truth”
- “Lack-a-Day”
- “Stop Holding Me Back”
- “What’s in a Name”

Act 2

- “Women’s Work”
- “Spring”
- “Stomachs and Stomachs”
- “A Jewel of a Duel”
- “Out of Sight, Out of Mind”
- “Lack-a-Day” (Reprise)
- “A Plot to Catch a Man In”
- “Out of Sight, Out of Mind” (Reprise)
- “Funeral March"
- “‘Twill Never be the Same”

== Reception ==
Richard Watts of The New York Post called the evening a "tedious and self-conscious antic . . . a very sedate jest."

== Sources ==
- Mantle, Burns (ed.) The Best Plays of 1949–1950, Dodd, Mead and Company, New York, 1950, p. 380.
- Dietz, Dan, “The Complete Book of 1950s Broadway Musicals,” Rowman & Littlefield, New York, 2014, pp. 24–26.
- Bordman, Gerald, “American Musical Theatre,” Oxford University Press, New York 1978, p. 573.
