= Beautiful Stories from Shakespeare =

1907 book by E. Nesbit

Beautiful Stories from Shakespeare.
- First US edition.
- Author: Edith Nesbit
- Language: English
- Genre: Children's novel
- Publisher: T. Fisher Unwin (UK); D.E. Cunningham & Co. (US)
- Publication date: 1907
- Publication place: United Kingdom
- Media type: Print (hardback & paperback)

Beautiful Stories from Shakespeare is a 1907 collection published by E. Nesbit with the intention of entertaining young readers and retelling William Shakespeare's plays in a way they could be easily understood by younger readers. She also included a brief Shakespeare biography, a pronunciation guide to some of the more difficult names and a list of famous quotations, arranged by subject. Some editions are entitled Beautiful Stories from Shakespeare for Children.

The book is an expanded version of Nesbit's earlier book, The Children's Shakespeare (1897), a collection of twelve tales likewise based on plays by William Shakespeare.

== Contents ==
The collection includes:

1. A Midsummer Night's Dream
2. The Tempest
3. As You Like It
4. The Winter's Tale
5. King Lear
6. Twelfth Night
7. Much Ado About Nothing
8. Romeo and Juliet
9. Pericles
10. Hamlet
11. Cymbeline
12. Macbeth
13. The Comedy of Errors
14. The Merchant of Venice
15. Timon of Athens
16. Othello
17. The Taming of the Shrew
18. Measure for Measure
19. Two Gentlemen of Verona
20. All's Well That Ends Well

== Reception and analysis ==
Published in 1907, the book has received a number of editions over the later years. Nesbit's collection presents a reworked version of the tales, rewritten to suit what Nesbit considered to be child's mentality and interpretative skills. The tales are sometimes prefaced with the opening "Once upon a time". Iona Opie in her introduction to the 1997 edition praised Nesbit's work by saying that she "has rehabilitated the plays as pure entertainment. She tells the stories with clarity and gusto.... giving the flavour of each play by the skillful use of short quotations"

Erica Hateley described Nesbit's style as follows: "she often retains scraps of the Shakespearean language, but glosses a meaning (or even an interpretation) for it, and quickly summarises entire scenes in brief paragraphs".
