= The Enchanted Castle =

1907 book by Edith Nesbit

- First edition
- Author: Edith Nesbit
- Illustrators: H. R. Millar (1907); Cecil Leslie (1964); Paul O. Zelinsky (1992)
- Language: English
- Genre: Children's Literature
- Publisher: Unwin
- Publication date: 1907
- Publication place: United Kingdom
- Media type: Print (hardcover)

The Enchanted Castle is a children's fantasy novel by Edith Nesbit first published in 1907.

== Plot summary ==
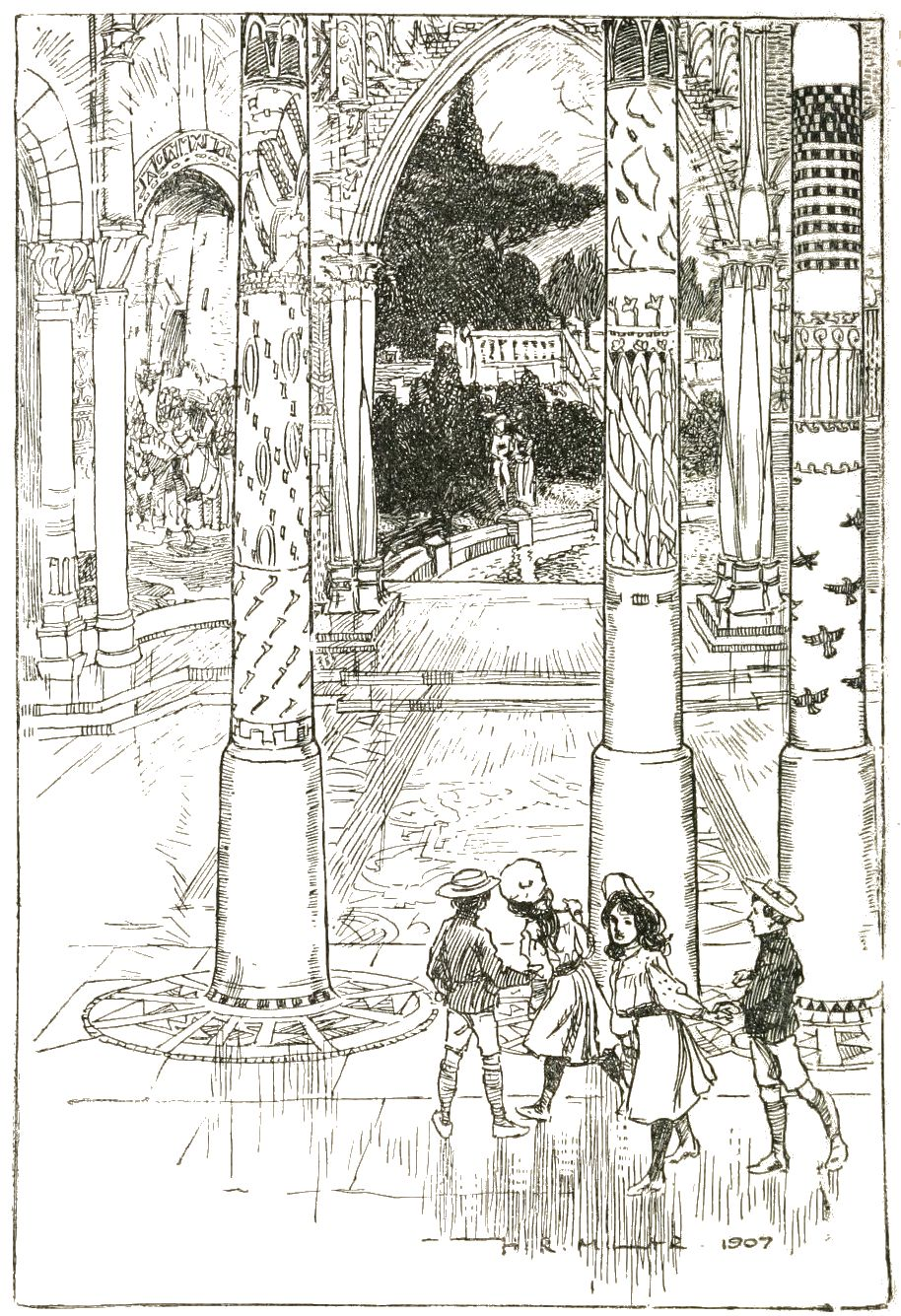
Frontispiece by H. R. Millar

The enchanted castle of the title is a country estate in the West Country seen through the eyes of three children, Jerry, Jimmy, and Kathy, who discover it while exploring during the school holidays. The lake, groves and marble statues, with white towers and turrets in the distance, make a fairy-tale setting, and then in the middle of the maze in the rose garden, they find a sleeping fairy-tale princess.

The "princess" tells them that the castle is full of magic, and they almost believe her. She shows them the treasures of the castle, including a magic ring she says is a ring of invisibility, but when it actually turns her invisible she panics and admits that she is the housekeeper's niece, Mabel, and was just play-acting.

The children soon find that the ring has other magical powers such as making the "Ugly-Wugglies" (Guy Fawkes style dummies they had made to swell the audience at one of their play-performances) come to life. They eventually discover that the ring is actually granting their own wishes, and that the disturbing results stem from their failure to specify those wishes precisely.

The Enchanted Castle was written for both children and adults. It combines descriptions of the imaginative play of children, reminiscent of The Story of the Treasure Seekers, with a magic more muted than in her major fantasies such as The Story of the Amulet.

== Adaptations ==
The Enchanted Castle was adapted into a TV-miniseries by the BBC in 1979. It has not been released on DVD or VHS in the UK: however, a DVD was released in Australia in 2013.
