= N. M. Bodecker =

Danish-American author and illustrator

- Born: Niels Mogens Bodecker; January 13, 1922; Copenhagen, Denmark
- Died: February 1, 1988 (aged 66); Hancock, New Hampshire, United States

N. M. Bodecker (January 13, 1922 – February 1, 1988) was an author and illustrator of children's books. Bodecker won the Christopher Award for poetry in 1974 and 1976. He is probably best remembered for illustrating Edward Eager's book series Tales of Magic, but he also illustrated works by Charles Dickens and periodicals including Harper’s Magazine, The Saturday Evening Post, and the New York Times. His original drawings for children’s books are housed by the Kerlan Collection at the University of Minnesota.

== Biography ==
Bodecker was born on January 13, 1922, in Copenhagen, Denmark. After World War II, he emigrated to America. In 1972, he moved to Hancock, New Hampshire, where he lived for the remainder of his life.

He had three sons.

He died on February 1, 1988, at the age of 66 of colon cancer.

== Name ==
The N. M. stood for Niels Mogens but, when asked, Bodecker would say "Nothing Much" or "Never Mind."

== Foundation ==
The N. M. Bodecker Foundation was established 2017 by Bodecker's son Sandy, a vice-president of Nike to "empower creative youth to imagine and achieve their artistic, educational, and professional dreams." Graduate programs began in 2020.
