= The Worst Thing About My Sister =

2012 novel by Jacqueline Wilson

- First edition cover
- Author: Jacqueline Wilson
- Original title: The Worst Thing About My Sister
- Illustrator: Nick Sharratt
- Cover artist: Nick Sharratt
- Language: English
- Genre: Fiction
- Publisher: Doubleday
- Publication date: 2 February 2012 (hardcover); 2 January 2013 (paperback)
- Publication place: England
- Media type: Book
- Pages: 289 (first edition hardback)
- Preceded by: Lily Alone
- Followed by: Four Children and It

The Worst Thing About My Sister is a book by Jacqueline Wilson about a young girl called Marty and her elder sister, Melissa. According to the author's website, it is recommended for ages 9–11.

== Plot ==
Martina Michaels ("Marty") is a tomboy who loves animals and drawing comics that feature a character she created, Mighty Mart. Her elder sister Melissa loves the colour pink and make-up and is very feminine; Melissa does not get along with Marty. Their mother makes dresses and is a school secretary, and their father is a travel agent who is losing most of his income because of the rise in online bookings.

Marty is invited to a party hosted by a girl named Alisha, just because her mum made a dress for Alisha. Her mother forces Marty to attend and makes a blue party dress. The owner of the dancing school where the party is held wants Marty's mum to make some dance costumes for the children, and other parents want bridesmaids' dresses. This means that Marty's mother has to expand – she needs an extra room to sew in, so Marty and Melissa need to share a room, where Melissa gets to choose the decor as she is the eldest. At school, mean girls call Marty "bluebottle" because of her dress. Marty sneaks in raw eggs and throws them at the bullies resulting in some disastrous consequences. Marty invites her best friend Jaydene to look at her new room, but Jaydene acts like she prefers Melissa to Marty, which annoys her. When Melissa shows her friends the room, she is shocked to find Marty has trashed the room. Marty brings up some smoothies as an apology and is horrified to find out that Melissa is mocking her homemade animals. Marty embarrasses her by showing her friends Melissa's toy Baba, and Melissa swears she will take revenge.

In the morning Marty can't find all her animals and as the bin men had already been, presumes that Melissa has thrown them in the bin. Marty begins to pull off Baba's limbs but as a shocked Melissa climbs up the bunk bed ladder to get to Marty, the ladder breaks and causes her to lose her grip and fall. Melissa gets taken to a hospital where she is visited by Marty. Marty and her dad return home and she finds her animals were under the bed all along. Marty sews together Baba and takes it to the hospital where the sisters reconcile. The story ends with Marty saying how much she loves Melissa.

== Reception ==
The book sold 10,871 copies in its first week, ranking 10th on The Bookseller's Official UK Top 50 chart.

Lancashire Evening Post's Pam Norfolk wrote that the book was "full of fun, frolics and little pearls of wisdom" and "gives quarrelling sisters plenty of food for thought".

The Guardian bemoaned the absence of Melissa's perspective, but concluded by recommending the book to "younger readers of about 8-9 years of age who like an exciting story creeping up to an amazing climax".

UK charity BookTrust wrote: "All fans of Jacqueline Wilson's warm-hearted family stories are sure to enjoy this enjoyable tale of the ups and downs of a relationship between two very different sisters, accompanied by Nick Sharratt's much-loved illustrations."
