= Edward Eager =

American children's and theatrical writer (1911–1964)

- Born: June 20, 1911; Toledo, Ohio
- Died: October 23, 1964 (aged 53); Stamford, Connecticut
- Education: Harvard University
- Occupation: Writer
- Spouse: Jane Eberly (m. 1938)
- Children: Fritz
- Writing career
- Language: English
- Period: 1942–1962
- Genres: Drama, children's literature

Edward McMaken Eager (June 20, 1911 – October 23, 1964) was an American lyricist, dramatist, and writer of children's fiction. His children's novels were largely contemporary low fantasy, featuring the appearance of magic in the lives of ordinary children.

== Biography ==
Eager was born and grew up in Toledo, Ohio, and attended Harvard University as a member of the class of 1935. After graduation, he moved to New York City, where he lived for 14 years before moving to Connecticut. He married Jane Eberly in 1938 and they had a son, Fritz. Eager was a childhood fan of L. Frank Baum's Oz series, and started writing children's books when he could not find stories he wanted to read to his own young son. In his books, Eager often acknowledges his debt to E. Nesbit, whom he thought of as the best children's author of all time. Eager died of lung cancer on October 23, 1964, in Stamford, Connecticut, aged 53.

== Theatrical works ==
- Village Barber, The: "An Operetta" with book and lyrics by Edward Eager. Music by Johann Schenk. Produced by The Columbia Theater Associates of Columbia University at Brander Matthews Hall (NYC – 1942) starring Philip Duey, Wallace House, Edith Campbell, Jan Lindermann, etc. Directed by Milton Smith.
- Pudding Full of Plums (1943)
- Sing Out, Sweet Land! (1944), "a salute to American folk and popular music". With Elie Siegmeister, he wrote three new numbers for the show.
- Dream with Music (1944), a "musical fantasy" in which a soap opera writer dreams that she is Scheherazade in old Baghdad, where her real life acquaintances turn up as Aladdin, the Sultan, etc. Wrote lyrics to music from Schubert, Beethoven, Saint-Saens, Weber, Chopin, Wagner, Haydn and Foster as culled by Clay Warnick. Balanchine choreographed.
- Beachcomber Club Revue of 1946, Books & Lyrics by Edward Eager; Music by John Frederick Coots (1946)
- The Liar, New Musical Comedy, Book by Edward Eager & Alfred Drake; Lyrics by Edward Eager; Music by John Mundy (1950)
- The Gambler: Eager and Alfred Drake co-authored the English-language adaptation of Ugo Betti's 1950 play Il giocatore
- To Hell With Orpheus: "Comic Opera" with book and lyrics by Edward Eager (Adapted by Ring Lardner, Jr.). Music by Jacques Offenbach (Adapted by Sylvan Levin). Produced at St. John Terrell's Music Circus (Lambertville, NJ – No date) starring Jo Sullivan (Wife of Frank Loesser), Morley Meredith, Peggy O' Hara, Lulu Bates, etc. Directed by Robert C. Jarvis. Choreographed by Rex Cooper. Songs include: "Vacation", "You Can't Do That in Idlewild", "To Be or Not To Be", "The Story of My Life", "Brunswick, Maine", "The Hades Galop", etc.
- The Adventures of Marco Polo, April 14, 1956

Music: Clay Warnick & Mel Pahl
Lyrics: Edward Eager
Book: William Friedberg & Neil Simon
Cast: Alfred Drake, Doretta Morrow
Those who originally led Broadway's Kismet starred in Polo, with the score contrived around themes by Rimsky-Korsakov. The story was lightly suggested by the actual exploits of the guy who opened China to the West. This production did well, and Columbia released an LP of the score

- CBS Radio Workshop, May 4, 1956 The Toledo War (An Operatic Parlor Piece) Libretto by Edward Eager, Music by David Broekman (From credits on mp3 recording of episode.)
- NBC's Holiday, June 9, 1956,

Music: loosely adapted from Johann Strauss
Lyrics: Edward Eager
Cast: Doretta Morrow, Keith Andes, Kitty Carlisle, Bambi Lynn, Tammy Grimes, George S. Irving, Jaques D'Amboise
Loosely organized around Elmer Rice's play The Grand Tour, the story told of a New England schoolteacher who fell for embezzling banker during a trip to Europe. In the end of the musical she uses family monies to cover his misdoings, an odd resolution even by the looser standards of modern ethics.

- Miranda and the Dark Young Man Music by Elie Siegmeister, Libretto by Edward Eager (1957)
- Dr. Willy Nilly with Pembroke Davenport (1959)
- Gentlemen, Be Seated! Libretto by Edward Eager, music by Jerome Moross (1963?) Produced for New York City Opera, 1963 with Dick Shawn and Alice Ghostley
- NBC Opera Theater, mentioned in various places as ongoing, Lyricist, 1950–1963
- Call It Virtue based on play by Luigi Pirandello, translated and adapted by Edward Eager (1963).
- Rugantino lyric translation by Edward Eager (1964)

== Literature ==
Articles

- Eager, Edward. "A Father's Minority Report". The Horn Book Magazine, March 1948, pp. 74 and 104–09.
- Eager, Edward. "Daily Magic". Horn Book, October 1958, p. 348–58.

Standalone picture books

- Red Head (1951)
- Mouse Manor (1952), illustrated by Beryl Bailey-Jones
- Playing Possum (1955), illus. Paul Galdone

Mouse Manor is told from the viewpoint of Miss Myrtilla the mouse, sole occupant of the manor which she has inherited from her mother. She keeps house faithfully, dusting the family portraits and baking a bag pudding for her solitary Christmas dinner.

=== Tales of Magic ===
All seven books were illustrated by N. M. Bodecker and published by Harcourt, Brace (finally Harcourt, Brace & World). The series's name may date from the 2000 boxed set of books 1–4, Edward Eager's Tales of Magic (Odyssey/Harcourt Young Classic; ISBN 0-15-202546-4).

1. Half Magic (1954)
2. Knight's Castle (1956)
3. Magic by the Lake (1957)
4. The Time Garden (1958)
5. Magic or Not? (1959)
6. The Well-Wishers (1960)
7. Seven-Day Magic (1962)

The first book, Half Magic, comes earliest in the series' chronology. Magic by the Lake is its direct sequel, in that it features the same children in further adventures at about the same age. The second book, Knight's Castle, is set one generation later, and The Time Garden is its direct sequel. Magic or Not? features different children, and The Well-Wishers is its direct sequel. Seven-Day Magic features a fourth set of children.

Half Magic

A dull summer is improved when Katharine, Mark, Jane and Martha find a magical coin-like talisman. However, it grants only half of any wish made by its bearer: a wish to be on a desert island sends them to the Sahara desert, and their mother ends up halfway home when she wishes to return home during a dull visit to her relatives. That "half magic" is a challenge, sometimes comical, until the children learn to double their wishes.

Half Magic was a number one seller in America. Anthony Boucher, comparing the novel to Nesbit, described it as "gay and charming, yet rigidly governed fantasy in the Unknown manner."

Magic by the Lake

Magic by the Lake continues the adventures of Martha, Jane, Mark, and Katharine from Half Magic. Their summer vacation is enlivened by an entire magic lake, channeled through a talking, and somewhat grumpy, box turtle. They are stranded on a desert island, visit Ali Baba's cave, and are eventually rescued by children who appear in the next book.

Half Magic and Magic by the Lake are set in the 1920s, much earlier than the other Tales. They draw on Eager's own childhood in that period, including vacations at Hamilton Lake in northern Indiana (the setting for Magic by the Lake).

Knight's Castle

Martha's children, Roger and Ann, and their cousins, Aunt Katharine's children Eliza and Jack, find that the combination of a toy castle, Scott's Ivanhoe, and a little magic can lead to another series of adventures. The Tales of Magic contain many references to the children's novels of E. Nesbit (1890s to 1910s); Knight's Castle pays explicit tribute to Nesbit's The Magic City. It also refers explicitly to the cartoons of Charles Addams. (Half Magic includes a reference to a short story by Saki.) Knight's Castle won the Ohioana Book Award for Juvenile Literature in 1957.

The Time Garden

Eliza, Jack, Roger, and Ann find an herb garden where thyme grows, which lets them travel through time (until the thyme is ripe). They are assisted by the Natterjack. On one adventure they rescue their Aunt Jane, Uncle Mark and their mothers from an adventure they took as children. This gives an alternate view of one of the adventures in Magic by the Lake. The book was influenced by two novels by C.S. Lewis: The Last Battle, in which one of the children is separated from the magic land, and The Magician's Nephew, in which Uncle Andrew's attitude makes him unable to hear any but animal noises from the talking animals. Similarly, Jack becomes unable to sense the magic because he has discovered a different kind of magic, in girls. The book's ending is more hopeful than Lewis's, however: in a final picture, all the children are shown but Jack's picture is replaced with his name and a heart drawn round it.

Magic or Not?

Laura, James, and their new neighbors, Kip and Lydia, wish up some summer adventures when the well in their new yard is more than they imagined.

Where the first four Tales of Magic and the last one feature unambiguously magical events, Magic or Not? and its sequel The Well-Wishers differ in tone. All the apparently magical events in these two novels are described ambiguously, with clues also to possible non-supernatural explanations. This and the following book are set near Eager's own home on Silvermine Road near Stamford.

The Well-Wishers

The children return to the ambiguously magical wishing well from Magic or Not? for another series of unpredictable adventures that may or may not be magical. The book has a more realistic tone than the others.

Seven-Day Magic

Barnaby, John, Susan, Abbie and Fredericka check out a tattered book from the library for seven days. It records every word they say. Soon they find that it not only records events, but creates new magical adventures.

Among the Magic novels only Seven-Day Magic features children who do not appear in at least one other book. It does refer to Half Magic by name, and has a chapter where the children visit the very end of Half Magic and what might have happened afterwards.

Among their adventures, the children visit the era when Laura Ingalls Wilder was a girl and John's grandmother was a school-teacher; they speculate that the time may be that of On the Banks of Plum Creek. On the other hand, as the adventure concludes with a blizzard, Edward Eager may have been dramatizing the beginning of the 1888 Schoolhouse Blizzard. The adventure is too brief and the text too unclear to be certain.

Seven-Day Magic was Eager's last book.
