= H. R. Millar =

Scottish graphic artist and illustrator

- Born: Harold Robert Millar; 1869; Thornhill, Dumfriesshire, Scotland
- Died: 1942 (aged 72–73)
- Known for: Children's Literature

Harold Robert Millar (1869–1942) was a prominent and prolific Scottish graphic artist and illustrator of the late nineteenth and early twentieth centuries. He is best known for his illustrations of children's books and fantasy literature. "His work ... has a lively, imaginative charm and a distinctive sense of design."

== Life and work ==
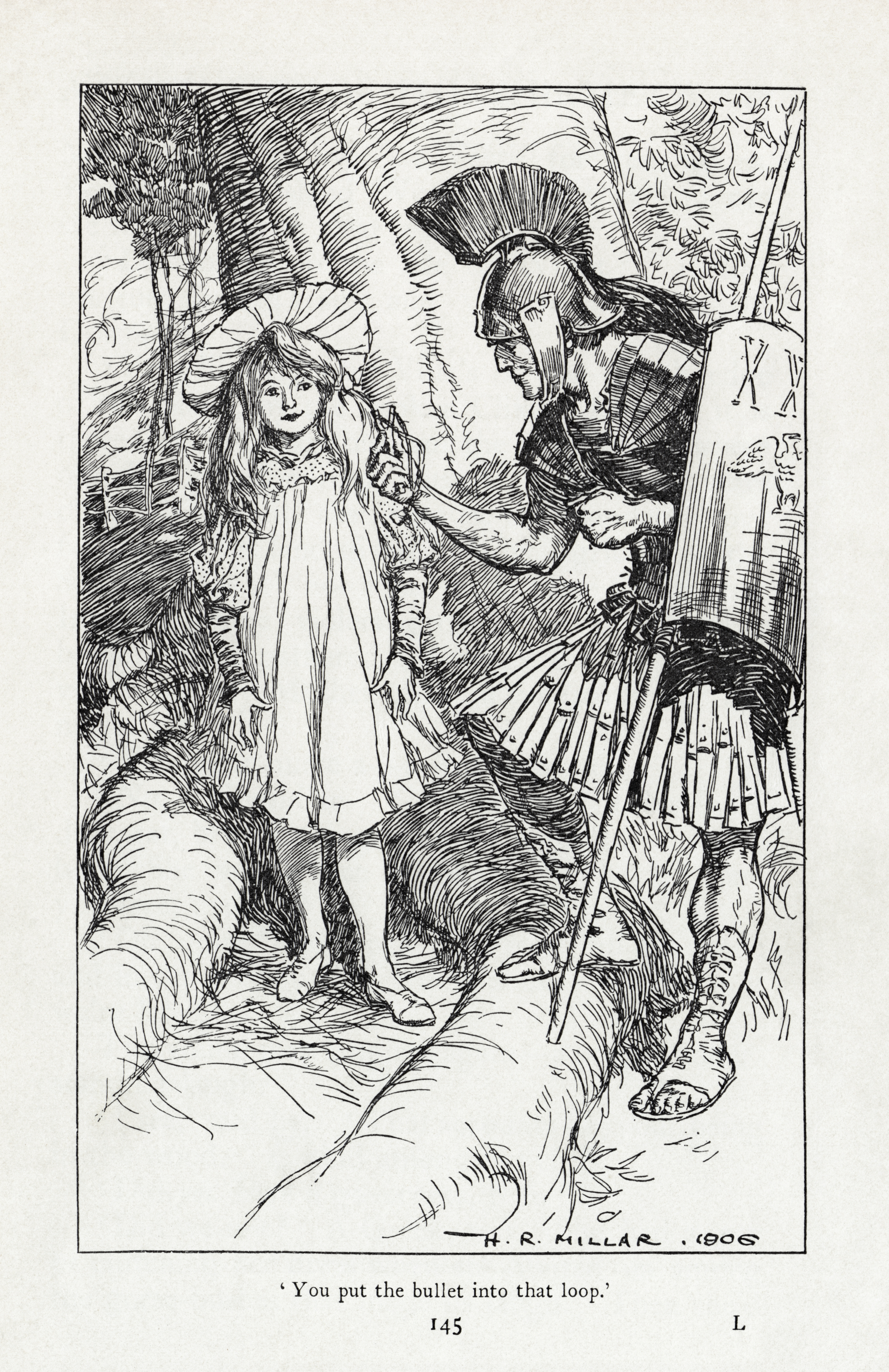
"A Centurion of the Thirtieth" from Kipling's Puck of Pook's Hill (1906)

A native of Thornhill, Dumfriesshire, Millar first pursued civil engineering before deciding upon an artistic career. He then studied at the Wolverhampton Art School and the Birmingham School of Art and established his career as a magazine illustrator with Punch, Good Words, and other periodicals of the day.

Millar illustrated fables for The Strand Magazine, and anthologies of tales, The Golden Fairy Book, The Silver Fairy Book, The Diamond Fairy Book, and The Ruby Fairy Book. He illustrated books by a wide range of British authors of his time, including Sir Arthur Quiller-Couch, Robert Louis Stevenson, and Rudyard Kipling. He had an extensive working relationship with E. Nesbit, and has been called "the most sympathetic and perhaps the most talented of her illustrators."

Apart from fantasy and children's books, Millar drew pictures for works like Kate Lawson's Highways and Homes of Japan (1910) and Arthur Radclyffe Dugmore's African Jungle Life (1928). Millar was a noted collector of Eastern art and exotic and ancient weapons; he employed his interest and knowledge in these areas in his artwork.

A partial list of the books Millar illustrated includes:

- George Eliot's Scenes of Clerical Life
- H. Rider Haggard's The Brethren
- Newman Harding's The Little Black Monkey and The Little Grey Pedlar
- Nathaniel Hawthorne's Tanglewood Tales
- Howard Angus Kennedy's The New World Fairy Book and The Canadian Fairy Book
- Kipling's Kim and Puck of Pook's Hill
- Captain Marryat's Frank Mildmay, The Phantom Ship, and Snarley-Yow
- Mrs. Molesworth's Peterkin, and The Wood-pigeons and Mary
- James Morier's The Adventures of Hajji Baba of Ispahan
- Edith Nesbit's The Book of Dragons, The Enchanted Castle, Five Children and It, The House of Arden, The Magic City, The Phoenix and the Carpet, The Story of the Amulet, and other works
- Thomas Love Peacock's Headlong Hall and Nightmare Abbey
- Quiller-Couch's Fairy Tales Far and Near
- Tetta Ward's My Fairy Tale Book
