= Five Children and It =

1902 children's novel

Five Children and It...
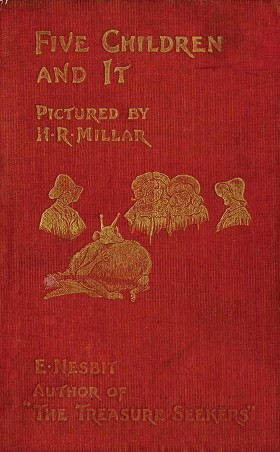
- First edition
- Author: Edith Nesbit
- Illustrator: H. R. Millar
- Language: English
- Series: Five Children (a.k.a. Psammead) series
- Genre: Children's literature Fantasy
- Publisher: T. Fisher Unwin
- Publication date: 1902
- Publication place: United Kingdom
- Media type: Print
- OCLC: 4378896
- Followed by: The Phoenix and the Carpet
- Text: Five Children and It... at Wikisource

Five Children and It is a fantasy children's novel by English author E. Nesbit. It was originally published in 1902 in the Strand Magazine under the general title The Psammead, or the Gifts, with a segment appearing each month from April to December. The stories were then expanded into a novel which was published the same year. It is the first volume of a trilogy that includes The Phoenix and the Carpet (1904) and The Story of the Amulet (1906). The book has never been out of print since its initial publication.

== Plot ==
Like Nesbit's The Railway Children, the story begins when a group of children move from London to the countryside of Kent. The five children (Cyril, Anthea, Robert, Jane, and their baby brother, Hilary, known as "the Lamb") are playing in a gravel pit when they uncover a rather grumpy, ugly, and occasionally malevolent Psammead, a sand-fairy with the ability to grant wishes. The Psammead persuades the children to take one wish each day to be shared among them, with the caveat that the wishes will turn to stone at sunset. This, apparently, used to be the rule in the Stone Age, when all that children wished for was food, the bones of which then became fossils. The five children's first wish is to be "as beautiful as the day." The wish ends at sunset and its effects simply vanish, leading the Psammead to observe that some wishes are too fanciful to be changed to stone.

All the wishes go comically wrong. The children wish to be beautiful, but the servants do not recognise them and shut them out of the house. They wish to be rich, then find themselves with a gravel-pit full of gold spade guineas that no shop will accept as they are no longer in circulation, so they cannot buy anything. A wish for wings seems to be going well, but at sunset the children find themselves stuck on top of a church bell tower with no way down, getting them into trouble with the gamekeeper who must take them home (though this wish has the happy side-effect of introducing the gamekeeper to the children's housemaid, who later marries him). Robert is bullied by the baker's boy, then wishes that he was bigger — whereupon he becomes eleven feet tall, and the other children show him at a travelling fair for coins. They also wish themselves into a castle, only to learn that it is being besieged, while a wish to meet real Red Indians ends with the children nearly being scalped.

The children's infant brother, the Lamb, is the victim of two wishes gone awry. In one, the children become annoyed with tending to their brother and wish that someone else would want him, leading to a situation where everyone wants the baby, and the children must fend off kidnappers and Gypsies. Later, they wish that the baby would grow up faster, causing him to grow all at once into a selfish, smug young man who promptly leaves them all behind.

Finally, the children accidentally wish that they could give a wealthy woman's jewellery to their mother, causing all the jewellery to appear in their home. It seems that the gamekeeper, who is now their friend, will be blamed for the robbery, and the children must beg the Psammead for a complex series of wishes to set things right. It agrees, on the condition that they will never ask for any more wishes. Only Anthea, who has grown close to It, makes sure that the final wish is that they will meet It again. The Psammead assures them that this wish will be granted.

== Characters ==
=== The five children ===
- Cyril, known as Squirrel: the eldest sibling, who is brave, diplomatic, and book-smart (very intelligent)
- Anthea, known as Panther: the second eldest, who is kind, sensible, and good-hearted.
- Robert, known as Bobs: the middle child, he is a practical joker with a quick temper.
- Jane, known as Pussy: a generally agreeable little girl with a tendency to be oversensitive, she is sometimes weepy and easily frightened.
- Hilary, the baby, known as the Lamb (because his first word was "baa"). He is too young to walk and has to be carried everywhere.

=== The Psammead ===
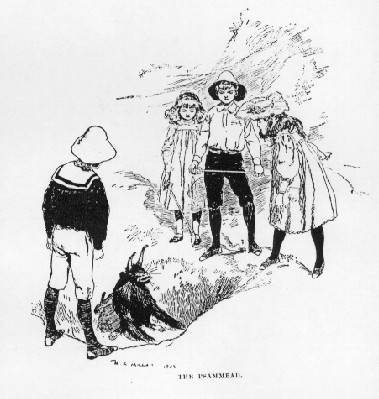
The Psammead in frontispiece by H. R. Millar

The Psammead is described as having "eyes [that] were on long horns like a snail's eyes. It could move them in and out like telescopes; it had ears like a bat's ears, and its tubby body was shaped like a spider's and covered with thick soft fur; its legs and arms were furry too, and it had hands and feet like a monkey's" and whiskers like a rat's. When it grants wishes it stretches out its eyes, holds its breath and swells alarmingly.

The five children find the Psammead in a gravel pit, which used to be seashore. There were once many Psammeads, but the others died when they got wet and caught cold. It is the last of its kind. It is thousands of years old, and remembers pterodactyls and other ancient creatures. When the Psammeads were around they granted wishes that were then mostly for food. The wished-for objects turned into stone at sunset if they were not used that day, but this does not apply to the children's wishes because what they wish for is so much more fantastic than the wishes the Psammead granted in the past.

The word "Psammead", pronounced "sammyadd" by the children in the story, appears to be a coinage by Nesbit from the Greek ψάμμος "sand" after the pattern of dryad, naiad and oread, implicitly signifying "sand-nymph". However, its hideous appearance is unlike traditional Greek nymphs, who generally resemble beautiful maidens.

== Sequels ==
=== By Nesbit ===
The book's ending was clearly intended to leave readers in suspense:

"They did see it [the Psammead] again, of course, but not in this story. And it was not in a sand-pit either, but in a very, very, very different place. It was in a – But I must say no more."

The children reappear in The Phoenix and the Carpet (1904) and The Story of the Amulet (1906). The Psammead is offstage in the first of these sequels (it is simply mentioned by the Phoenix, who visits it three times to ask for a helpful wish when the situation becomes difficult), but it plays a significant role in the second sequel after the children rescue it from a pet shop. An omnibus edition of the three books titled Five Children was published in 1930. The trilogy is also known as the Psammead series.

=== By other authors ===
The Return of the Psammead (1992) by Helen Cresswell concerns another family of Edwardian children who encounter the Psammead.

Four Children and It (2012) by Jacqueline Wilson is a contemporary retelling of the story in which four children from a modern stepfamily encounter the Psammead. One of the children has read the original book and wishes to meet Cyril, Anthea, Jane and Robert.

In Five Children on the Western Front (2014) by Kate Saunders, set nine years after the original story, the children encounter the horrors of the First World War.

== Adaptations ==
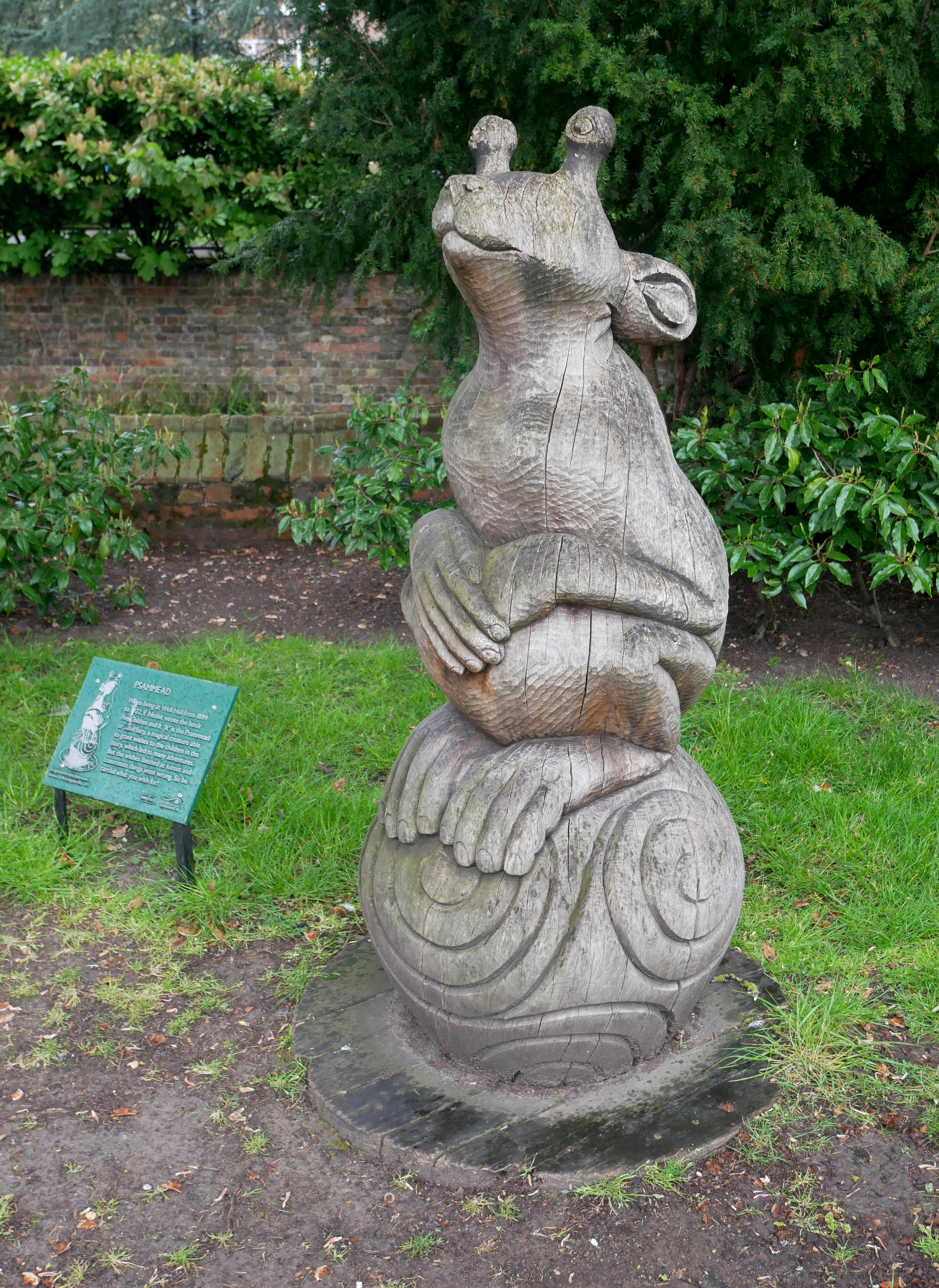
Sculpture of the Psammead in Well Hall, Eltham in southeast London

=== Television ===
- In 1985–86 NHK broadcast a Japanese anime version, Onegai! Samia-don. 39 episodes were produced by animation studio TMS. No English dubbed version was ever produced, but it came out in other languages.
- There have been two adaptations on British television of the novel, both by the BBC. In 1951 a basic two part production was dramatised by Dorothea Brooking. This was only shown in the South of England and Midlands. A more lavish production was made in 1991 when the BBC turned the story into a six-part television series. It was released in the UK under the story's original title. In the USA it was released as The Sand Fairy. This was followed by The Return of the Psammead in 1993, where the Psammead alone linked the two series. Both series were scripted by Helen Cresswell, and Francis Wright puppeteered and voiced the Psammead.
- In 2018, as The Psammy Show, an animated series co-produced by DQ Entertainment, Method Animation and Disney Germany. This envisioned the title character as a green dog-like creature.

=== Film ===
- In 2004 a film version was released, starring Freddie Highmore, Tara FitzGerald, Jonathan Bailey, Zoë Wanamaker and Kenneth Branagh, with Eddie Izzard as the voice of the Psammead.

=== Theatre ===
- A stage musical adaptation by Timothy Knapman (book) and Philip Godfrey (music/lyrics) was completed in 2016.
- In 2022, it was adapted into another musical by playwright Rita Cheung Baird.

=== Comics ===
- It was also adapted as a comic strip by Henry Seabright.

== Works inspired by ==
A wizard named Psamathos Psamathide, described as a "Psamathist" (expert in sand) appears in J. R. R. Tolkien's Roverandom. The character, in an early draft, originally belonged to an order of "Psammeads".
