= The Magic City (novel) =

1910 book by E. Nesbit

- Front cover of the first edition
- Author: Edith Nesbit
- Illustrator: H. R. Millar
- Language: English
- Genre: Children's fantasy novel
- Publisher: Macmillan
- Publication date: 1910
- Publication place: United Kingdom
- Media type: Print (hardcover; later paperback)
- Pages: 333 pp

The Magic City is a children's book by E. Nesbit, first published in 1910. It initially appeared as a serial in The Strand Magazine, with illustrations by Spencer Pryse.

== Plot summary ==
After Philip's older sister and sole family member Helen marries, he goes off to live with Helen's new step daughter Lucy. He has trouble adjusting at first, thrown into the world different from his previous life and abandoned by his sister while she is on her honeymoon. To entertain himself he builds a giant model city from things around the house: game pieces, books, blocks, bowls, etc. Then, through some magic, he finds himself inside the city, and it is alive with the people he has populated it with. Some soldiers find him and tell him that two outsiders have been foretold to be coming: a Deliverer and a Destroyer. Mr. Noah, from a Noah's Ark playset, tells Philip that there are seven great deeds to be performed if he wants to prove himself the Deliverer. Lucy, too, has found her way into the city and joins Philip as a co-Deliverer, much to his chagrin.

== Locations ==
- Laburnum Cottage—Philip and Helen's home at the start of the book.
- The Grange—the home of Helen's new husband, and her step-daughter Lucy.
- Polistarchia—the country of the Magic City. Within Polistarchia:

- Polistopolis—the Magic City of the title, capital of Polistarchia.
- The Land of the Dwellers by the Sea—a region of Polistarchia.
- The Island—off the shore in the Sea.
- Somnolentia—formerly Briskford, renamed by the Great Sloth, in the north of Polistarchia, home of the Halma people.

== Characters in "The Magic City" ==
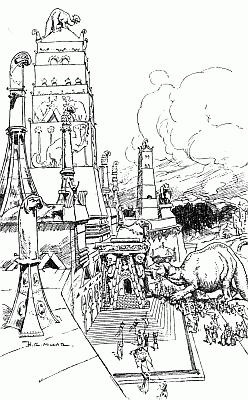
Temple of the Great Sloth, illustration by H. R. Millar

- From Laburnum Cottage:

- Philip also called Pip.
- Helen, his sister.

- At the Grange are:

- Lucy (Lu for short).
- Peter Graham, her father.
- The Nurse.

- In Polistarchia are:

- Mr. Noah, the chief judge.
- Mr. Perrin, the carpenter.
- The motor veil lady, given the title of "Pretender-in-Chief to the Claimancy of the Deliverership" and called Pretenderette for short.
- The Lord High Islander.

- Animals from Polistarchia:

- Polly, the parrot.
- Max and Brenda, the dogs.
- The Hippogriff.
- The Great Sloth

== The Great Deeds ==
Philip and Lucy performed the Great Deeds to prove that he was Deliverer and she co-Deliverer. Some of them were mostly done by one person, and some equally labored over. Three of them were pronounced Great Deeds by Mr. Noah after they had been performed, the other four were assigned tasks.

1. Kill the Dragon: assigned, done by Philip, while Lucy played the role of Princess in distress.

2. Disentangling the Mazy Carpet: assigned, mostly done by Lucy.

3. Slay the Fear of the Dwellers by the Sea: assigned, done mostly by Philip.

4. Slaying the Lions in the Desert: shared task, completed before 3, pronounced a deed after the fact.

5. Supplying Polistarchia with Fruit: done by Philip, pronounced a deed after the fact.

6. Devise a Means of Keeping the Great Sloth Awake and Busy: assigned task, shared effort.

7. Freeing Polistopolis from the Pretenderette: shared task, pronounced a deed after the fact.

== See also ==
- Edward Eager
