= The Phoenix and the Carpet =

1904 fantasy novel by E. Nesbit

- First edition
- Author: Edith Nesbit
- Illustrator: H. R. Millar
- Language: English
- Series: Psammead Trilogy
- Genre: Fantasy, Children's novel
- Publisher: Newnes
- Publication date: 1904
- Publication place: United Kingdom
- Media type: Print (hardback and paperback)
- Preceded by: Five Children and It
- Followed by: The Story of the Amulet
- Text: The Phoenix and the Carpet at Wikisource

The Phoenix and the Carpet is a fantasy novel for children. It is written by E. Nesbit and first published in 1904. It is the second in a trilogy of novels that begins with Five Children and It (1902), and follows the adventures of the same five children: Cyril, Anthea, Robert, Jane and the Lamb. Their mother buys the children a new carpet to replace one from the nursery that they destroyed in an accidental fire. The children find an egg in the carpet, which hatches into a talking Phoenix. The Phoenix explains that the carpet is a magic one that will grant them three wishes a day. The five children go on many adventures, which eventually wear out their magic carpet. The adventures are continued and concluded in the third book of the trilogy, The Story of the Amulet (1906).

== Plot ==
Shortly before 5 November, celebrated in Britain as Guy Fawkes Night, when people build bonfires and set off fireworks. The four children have accumulated a small hoard of fireworks for the night, but they are too impatient to wait until 5 November to light them, so they set off a few samples in the nursery. This results in the fire that destroys the original carpet. To replace it their parents purchase a second-hand carpet, which is found to contain an egg that emits a phosphorescent glow. The children accidentally knock the egg into the fire, whereupon it hatches, revealing a golden talking Phoenix.

It transpires that this is a magic carpet that can transport the children anywhere they wish, although it is capable of fulfilling only three wishes a day. Accompanied by the Phoenix, the children have exotic adventures. There is a moment of terror when the youngest, the baby known as the Lamb, crawls onto the carpet, babbles incoherently and vanishes, but it turns out that the Lamb only desires to be with his mother.

At a few points in the novel, the children find themselves in predicaments from which the Phoenix is unable to rescue them by himself, so he goes to find the Psammead and has a wish granted for the children's sake. In addition, at the end the carpet is sent to ask the Psammead to grant the Phoenix's wish. These offstage incidents are the only contributions made by the Psammead to this story.

A special edition published by the "Phoenix Assurance Company" of London in 1956

Four of the children (without the Lamb) attend a Christmas pantomime at a theatre in the West End of London, smuggling the Phoenix along inside Robert's coat. The Phoenix is so excited by this spectacle that he unintentionally sets fire to the theatre. All ends well when the Phoenix magically reverses the damage: no one is harmed, and the theatre remains intact.

One aspect of The Phoenix and the Carpet that is unusual for children's fantasy fiction is the fact that the magical companion does not treat all the children equally. The Phoenix favours Robert, the child who put his egg in the fire, albeit by accident, over his brother Cyril and their sisters. This is a mixed privilege, as Robert is lumbered with the duty of smuggling the Phoenix past their parents at inconvenient moments.

The "Phoenix Assurance Company"'s bookmark given with the special edition

In the novel's final chapter, the Phoenix announces that he has reached the end of his current lifespan and must begin the cycle again, apparently on the grounds that life with the children has left him far more exhausted than he would have been in the wilderness. He lays a new egg from which he will eventually be reborn. Under the Phoenix's direction, the children prepare an altar with sweet incense, upon which the Phoenix immolates himself. The magic carpet has also reached the end of its lifespan, as it was never intended to be walked upon regularly, and, at the request of the Phoenix, it takes the egg to a place where it won't hatch again for 2,000 years. There is a happy ending, with the children receiving a parcel of gifts from an "unknown benefactor" (the Phoenix, who arranges this gift by means of a wish granted by the Psammead) and Robert receiving a single golden feather. But the feather has vanished by the evening.

The last volume in the trilogy, The Story of the Amulet, contains a minor episode in which the children travel thousands of years into the past and encounter the Phoenix, who does not recognise them because the events of the previous book have not happened yet.

== Characters ==
=== Main ===
Cyril – the oldest of the five children. He is nicknamed Squirrel. Cyril often takes on the role of leader and is sensible and level-headed. He is also the main decision-maker for the children. Although his decisions are sometimes challenged, he often has the final say in what the children do. Between the two older boys, Cyril is more considerate of morals when making decisions.

Anthea – the second oldest of the children. Her nickname is Pantha or Panther. She takes on the role of a mother figure. She is rational, polite, considerate, and well-mannered. She also considers morals when helping to make decisions. Anthea is the one who has the sewing skills to fix the carpet and who demonstrates the most compassion and remorse for it.

Robert – the third oldest of the five children. His nickname is Bob or Bobs. The Phoenix is most attached to him because he originally dropped the egg into the fire. Although Robert is one of the younger children, he represents an adult voice in the story – he recollects and tells the other children 'facts' that he gathered from his father over the years. He is also the one child who thinks to bring candles on their adventures after experiencing the dark tower and cave on the first carpet trip. He often takes on the role of protector of his sisters and the Phoenix.

Jane – the fourth child in the family. Her nickname is Pussy. She is a stereotypical representation of a nineteenth-century 'girl' child – innocent, afraid, and in need of male protection. She is also the one who persuades the burglar to milk the cow instead of robbing the house.

Lamb/Hilary – the baby and youngest of the children. His nickname is Lamb. His given name, Hilary, is revealed in the first book of the trilogy (Five Children and It). He is curious and reliant on others. He also exemplifies childhood innocence. His solo adventure on the carpet is one of the reasons why the children decide that the Phoenix and carpet must go.

Phoenix – a vain and arrogant creature, although less so than the Psammead. He hides the fact that he cares for the children until they are in trouble. He is also lonely and in constant search of praise. The Phoenix becomes the primary decision-maker and rescuer for the children when they cannot agree on where to go or how to get out of a situation. He is the only one who understands the carpet.

Carpet – a silent figure in the story, and yet one of the most important characters. It cannot think for itself, it is obedient and noble, and it endures the children's abuse. Although the carpet places the children in bad situations, it is also the instrument often used to extract them from those situations.

=== Supporting ===
Father – The father is relatively absent from the story. He shows up to entertain the children but leaves other child-rearing duties to the mother. It is the father who sends the four older children to the playhouse. He is the stereotypical father figure of the nineteenth century.

Mother – Mother is the angel of the house. She is most concerned with Lamb and gives the other children more freedom to do what they please. She goes out of the house often to meet with friends and takes part in social activities such as the bazaar.

Cook – In the beginning of the story the cook is constantly frustrated, annoyed by the children, impatient, and unpleasant to everyone in the household. She sees the children as a menace and cause of her stress. Once she becomes Queen of the island natives she becomes calm, serene, and cheerful, and she enjoys praise. On the island she never comes to accept reality and instead thinks she is in a long dream.

Burglar – The Burglar is simple-minded, kind, and somewhat inexperienced. He is swayed by Jane to milk the cow instead of rob the house. He is even convinced to take the cats that he hates. Although he goes to jail for selling the cats on the street, once he is freed by the children he marries the cook.

Reverend Septimus Blenkinsop – The Reverend performs the marriage ceremony for the cook and burglar. He is indecisive, friendly, honest, and curious of things magical or unknown to him. He is also a scientist and botanist.

Psammead – The Psammead is a magical figure connected to the children from the first book. It is never seen in the text by anyone but the children. This creature takes on the role of a Deus Ex Machina – it steps in throughout the story to rescue the children from the various situations they find themselves in.

== Themes and issues ==
References to other works: Nesbit alludes to many different works of literature that were familiar to and recognised by children in the early 20th century, including King Solomon's Mines, The Count of Monte Cristo, Rudyard Kipling's tales of India, The Arabian Nights and many others. She also assumes that her readers are familiar with religious works such as the New Version of the Psalms of David and popular magazines such as The Strand, the magazine in which The Phoenix and the Carpet first appeared.

Referenced in other works: In Part Three of the book The Dark is Rising, by Susan Cooper, The Phoenix and the Carpet is mentioned being read aloud to children during a terrible snow storm while many of the local villagers, including the main character Will, take shelter in the Old Manor house.

Gender roles: The female children, Anthea and Jane, undertake the domestic work that appears in the story while the male children Cyril and Robert become absent at such times. Nesbit's Phoenix is not described in terms of gender.

Intrusion fantasy: The Phoenix and the Carpet is an intrusion fantasy that includes marvellous creatures, such as the Phoenix, magical objects, such as the flying carpet, and fantastic events, such as flying on the carpet, that intrude into the realistic world in which the protagonists live. Normally characters in intrusion fantasy are surprised by the fantastic elements that enter their world. However, the children in The Phoenix and the Carpet are not surprised because they have encountered fantastic elements in Five Children and It. Adults within the novel are in disbelief of the fantastic elements because they try to rationalise the fantastic as a dream or insanity.

Social class: Nesbit wrote for the great middle-class of readers, and this novel contains some stereotypes of both the upper and lower classes. The cook, a lower-class character, is voiced in an ungrammatical pidgin-english; for instance, she says "...there's that there new carpet in their room..." (Chapter 3). The upper class, on the other hand, have money, status, education and leisure time to pursue such activities as theatregoing. The children's mother often leaves them behind to attend the theatre.

Narration: Nesbit's narrator seems to be an adult voice speaking to the child reader. The narrator comments on the story and asks the reader questions to give a fuller picture.

Realistic portrayal of children: Nesbit was known for her well-drawn child characters, described in Norton's Anthology of Children's Literature as "believable middle-class children who experience a series of adventures in unforeseen circumstances" (Zipes, et al.). They are generally good-natured and well-meaning, but they also quarrel amongst each other and get into trouble. They nearly burn their nursery down by setting off fireworks, call each other names and argue over trivial matters. Still, they did not mean for their fireworks to get out of control, they look out for one another, and they have a strong sense of right and wrong. Nesbit thus gently subverts the Romantic stereotype of children as innocent little angels.

Racial issues: Nesbit's work has been criticised by some critics as being racist and having anti-Semitic characterisations. In Chapter 3 of this novel the children encounter people described as having copper-toned skin, whom they immediately assume are savage cannibals.

== Adaptations ==
There have been at least four film adaptations of the novel. The BBC produced three television series: one week of Jackanory in 1965, another written by John Tully that aired in 1976, and finally The Phoenix and the Carpet (1997), with a new screenplay by Helen Cresswell.

A feature film was released in 1995: The Phoenix and the Magic Carpet, written by Florence Fox, directed by Zoran Perisic, starring Peter Ustinov as Grandfather and the voice of Phoenix, and Dee Wallace as Mother.

== Publication details ==
- 1904, UK, Newnes, 1904, hardback (first edition)
- 1956, UK, Ernest Benn, 1956, hardback special edition for the Phoenix Assurance Company
- 1978, USA, Pergamon Press (ISBN 978-0-8277-2144-9), June 1978, hardback
- 1995, UK, Puffin Books (ISBN 978-0-14-036739-3), 23 February 1995, paperback
- 1995, UK, Wordsworth Editions (ISBN 978-1-85326-155-8), March 1995, paperback
- 1999, USA, Yestermorrow Inc (ISBN 978-1-56723-170-0), April 1999, paperback
- 2003, UK, Wordsworth Editions(ISBN 978-1-85326-155-8), April 2003, paperback
