= The House of Arden =

1908 book by E. Nesbit

- Early edition cover
- Author: E. Nesbit
- Illustrator: H. R. Millar
- Language: English
- Genre: Fantasy, Children's Novel
- Publisher: T. Fisher Unwin
- Publication date: 1908
- Publication place: United Kingdom
- Media type: Print (hardback & paperback)
- Followed by: Harding's Luck

The House of Arden is a novel for children written by the English author E. Nesbit and published in 1908.

== Plot summary ==
A boy named Edred Arden inherits the title of Lord Arden and the dilapidated Arden Castle. He and his sister Elfrida are treasure hunting for the lost treasure of the Ardens and, with the help of the magical Mouldiwarp, they travel back in time searching for clues. The past events they witness include

- 1807: Napoleon's planned invasion of the United Kingdom, the British military response, and the smuggling around Dymchurch Bay (called "Lymchurch" in the story)
- c. 1705: a visit from the "Chevalier St. George" (the Old Pretender) during the reign of Queen Anne
- 1605: the Gunpowder Plot and a meeting with Sir Walter Raleigh in the Tower of London, from which the children escape using the same stratagem that Lady Nithsdale used in 1717
- ca. 1535: a May Day celebration with Anne Boleyn and Henry VIII, with premonitions of Anne's execution.

The final episode, in which the children rescue their father from a lost civilization in South America, is reminiscent of the legends of El Dorado and other Cities of Gold.

== Sequel ==
A sequel, Harding's Luck, was published in 1909, in which the nominally Tudor character of "cousin Richard Arden", who acts somewhat mysteriously in the original book, including recognising a Kodak camera, is given something of a backstory.

== Influence ==
The device of a pair of characters, a brother and a sister named Edred and Elfrida, who travel back in time from Edwardian England, guided by a magical character, Mouldiwarp, always meeting a similar pair of characters in each of the earlier centuries that they visit, is the central plot device in the book. J. R. R. Tolkien's unpublished attempt at a time travel novel, The Lost Road functions in the same way. The Lost Road has father/son pairs named Edwin/Elwin, Eadwine/Aelfwine, Audoin/Alboin, Amandil/Elendil (all meaning "Bliss-friend/Elf-friend" in Old English, Old High German, and Lombardic). Nesbit's Edred and Elfrida, too, have according to the Tolkien scholar Virginia Luling "intriguing[ly]" similar Old English names to Tolkien's paired characters; Edred is "Bliss-counsel", while Elfrida is "Elf-strength".
