= The Story of the Amulet =

1906 children's novel by Edith Nesbit

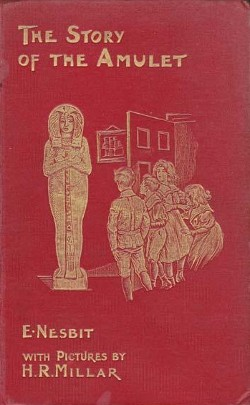
- First edition
- Author: Edith Nesbit
- Illustrator: H. R. Millar
- Language: English
- Series: Psammead Trilogy
- Genre: Fantasy, Children's Novel
- Publisher: T. Fisher Unwin
- Publication date: 1906
- Publication place: United Kingdom
- Media type: Print (hardback & paperback)
- Preceded by: The Phoenix and the Carpet
- Text: The Story of the Amulet at Wikisource

The Story of the Amulet is a novel for children, written in 1906 by the English author Edith Nesbit. It is the final part of a trilogy of novels and is preceded byFive Children and It (1902) and The Phoenix and the Carpet (1904).

== Premise ==
The children once more meet the Psammead, the "it" in Five Children and It. It no longer grants wishes to the children, but, like the Phoenix in the earlier book, can advise them, and guides them in the use of a magical amulet with time travel powers.

== Plot summary ==
The Amulet

The journalist father of Robert, Anthea, Cyril, and Jane has gone overseas to cover the war in Manchuria. Their mother has also gone away, to Madeira to recuperate from an illness, taking with her their younger brother, the Lamb. The children are living with an old Nurse (Mrs Green) who has set up a boarding house in central London. Her only other boarder is a scholarly Egyptologist who has filled his bedsit with ancient artefacts. During the course of the book, the children get to know the "poor learned gentleman" and befriend him and call him Jimmy.

Nurse's house is in Fitzrovia, the district of London near the British Museum, which Nesbit accurately conveys as having bookstalls and shops filled with unusual merchandise. In one of these shops the children find the Psammead. It had been captured by a trapper, who failed to recognise it as a magical being. The terrified creature cannot escape, for it can only grant wishes to others, not to itself. Using a ruse, the children persuade the shopkeeper to sell them the "mangy old monkey", and they free their old friend.

Urged to do so by the Psammead, the children purchase an ancient amulet in the shape of an Egyptian Tyet (a small amulet of very similar shape to the picture can be seen in the British Museum today) which should be able to grant them their hearts' desire: the safe return of their parents and baby brother. But this amulet is only half of an original whole. By itself, it cannot grant their hearts' desire. Yet it can serve as a portal, enabling time travel to find the other half.

The Amulet transports the children and the Psammead to times and places where the Amulet has previously existed, in the hope that – at some point in time – the children can find the Amulet's missing half. Among the ancient realms they visit are Babylon, Egypt, the Phoenician city of Tyre, a ship to "the Tin Islands" (ancient Cornwall), and Atlantis just before the flood. In one chapter, they meet Julius Caesar on the shores of Gaul, just as he has decided that Britain is not worth invading. Jane's childish prattling about the glories of England persuades Caesar to invade after all.

In each of their time-jaunts, the children are magically able to speak and comprehend the contemporary language. Nesbit acknowledges this in her narration, without offering any explanation. The children eventually bring "Jimmy" (the "Learned Gentleman") along with them on some of their time trips. For some reason, Jimmy does not share the children's magical gift of fluency in the local language: he can only understand (for example) Latin based on his own studies.

In one chapter the children also come to the future, visiting a British utopia in which H. G. Wells is venerated as a reformer. Wells and Nesbit were both members of the Fabian political movement, as was George Bernard Shaw, and this chapter in The Story of the Amulet is essentially different from all the other trips in the narrative: whereas all the other adventures in this novel contain scrupulously detailed accounts of past civilisations, the children's trip into the future represents Nesbit's vision of Utopia. This episode can be compared to many other visions of utopian socialist futures published in that era; Nesbit's is notable in that it concentrates on how the life of children at school would be radically different, with economic changes only appearing briefly in the background. (It seems somewhat akin to William Morris's News from Nowhere.) It also mentions a pressing danger of Edwardian England: the number of children wounded, burned, and killed each year. (This concern was addressed in the Children Act 1908 (8 Edw. 7. c. 67), and later in the Children's Charter.)

== Literary significance and criticism ==
The Story of the Amulet profits greatly from Nesbit's deep research into ancient civilisations in general and that of ancient Egypt in particular. The book is dedicated to Sir E. A. Wallis Budge, the translator of the Egyptian Book of the Dead and Keeper of Egyptian and Assyrian Antiquities of the British Museum, with whom she met to discuss the history of the ancient Near East while writing the book. The Amulet is sentient and is named Ur Hekau Setcheh; this is a genuine Ancient Egyptian name. The hieroglyphs on the back of the Amulet are also authentic.

Amulet coincidentally appeared the same year as the first instalment of another story involving children viewing different periods of history, Rudyard Kipling's Puck of Pook's Hill.

During their adventure in Babylon, the children attempt to summon a Babylonian deity named Nisroch but are temporarily unable to recall his name: Cyril, in an obvious in-joke, refers to the god as "Nesbit". Author E. Nesbit was a member of the Hermetic Order of the Golden Dawn, and was knowledgeable about ancient religions; she may well have been aware that there was indeed an ancient deity named Nesbit: this was the Egyptian god of the fifth hour of the day. In F. Gwynplaine MacIntyre's novel The Woman Between the Worlds (1994, taking place in 1898), E. Nesbit briefly appears in the narrative, dressed in costume as the Egyptian god Nesbit.

The chapter The Queen in London contains broadly negative stereotypes of stockbrokers clearly intended to be Jewish: they are described as having "curved noses"; they have Jewish names such as Levinstein, Rosenbaum, Hirsh and Cohen; and their dialogue is rendered in an exaggerated dialect of Yiddish-inflected English. They are depicted as shuddering at the thought of poor people eating good food, and then they are massacred by the queen's guards. Another character in the book, the shopkeeper Jacob Absalom, is hinted at being Jewish and is depicted negatively.

== Allusions and references in The Story of the Amulet ==
The chapter "The Queen in London" satirises contemporary occult belief. A journalist mistakes the Queen of Babylon for the Theosophist Annie Besant (like Nesbit, a socialist and social reformer) and mentions Theosophy in reference to (to him) inexplicable events taking place in the British Museum). "Thought-transference" (telepathy) also gets a mention as part of an elaborate and mistaken rationalisation by the Learned Gentleman of Anthea's stories of the Queen and ancient Babylon.

The ninth chapter, which takes place in Atlantis, though primarily inspired by Plato's dialogue Critias, also borrows such details from C. J. Cutcliffe Hyne's novel The Lost Continent: The Story of Atlantis (1899), such as the presence of mammoths, dinosaurs (or, as Nesbit has it, giant lizards) and a volcanic mountain on the island.

== Praise ==
Gore Vidal writes, "It is a time machine story, only the device is not a machine but an Egyptian amulet whose other half is lost in the past. By saying certain powerful words, the amulet becomes a gate through which the children are able to visit the past or future. ... a story of considerable beauty."

== Influence on other works ==
Several elements in The Story of the Amulet were borrowed by C. S. Lewis for his Narnia series, particularly The Horse and His Boy (1954) and The Magician's Nephew (1955). The Calormene god Tash closely resembles the deity Nisroch, whose name may also have influenced the title of the Calormene king, the Tisroc. Lewis's Tisroc, like Nesbit's King of Babylon, must have his name followed by "may he live forever", and the appearance of Jadis, Queen of Charn, in London in The Magician's Nephew, and the havoc she causes there, closely parallel the Queen of Babylon's eventful journey to London.

In the third canto of his poem "Villon" (written 1925, published 1930), British modernist poet Basil Bunting stated he took the image of two drops of quicksilver (mercury) merging from Nesbit's The Story of the Amulet and described her work as the "pleasantest reading of my childhood".
