= E. Nesbit =

English author and poet (1858–1924)

Edith Nesbit
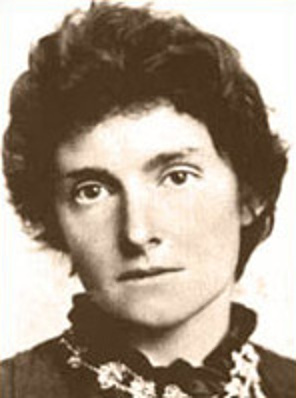
- Nesbit, c. 1890
- Born: 15 August 1858; Kennington, Surrey (now Greater London), England
- Died: 4 May 1924 (aged 65); New Romney, Kent, England
- Occupations: Writer, poet
- Spouse: Hubert Bland (m. 1880; died 1914) Thomas Tucker (m. 1917)
- Children: 5 (2 adopted)
- Parent: John Collis Nesbit (father)
- Writing career
- Pen name: E. Nesbit
- Period: 1886–1924
- Genre: Children's literature
- Notable works: The Story of the Treasure Seekers; The Railway Children; Five Children and It

Edith Nesbit (married name Edith Bland; 15 August 1858 – 4 May 1924) was an English writer and poet, who published her books for children and others as E. Nesbit. She wrote or collaborated on more than 60 such books. She was also a political activist and co-founder of the Fabian Society, a socialist organisation later affiliated to the Labour Party.

== Biography ==
Nesbit was born in 1858 at 38 Lower Kennington Lane, Kennington, Surrey (now London), (Note: Lower Kennington Lane is now the northern half of Kennington Lane, between Kennington Road and Newington Butts; the house has been demolished and there is no commemoration. Galvin, in her biography (p. 2), claims that Lower Kennington Lane is now buried deep below a main road and supermarkets. This rests on a confusion between modern Kennington Lane and its constituent former parts, Upper Kennington Lane and Lower Kennington Lane. Lower Kennington Lane still exists, though renamed and renumbered, but most of the houses of the 1850s have gone. An earlier version of the King's Arms public house, now at 98 Kennington Lane, was numbered 44 Lower Kennington Lane. The 1861 census records Edith Nesbit at her father's Agricultural College further along the street."Find My Past 1861 Census". search.findmypast.co.uk. That site is now occupied by 20th-century public housing.) the daughter of an agricultural chemist, John Collis Nesbit, who died in March 1862, before her fourth birthday. Her mother was Sarah Green (née Alderton).

The ill health of Nesbit's sister Mary meant that the family travelled for some years, living variously in Brighton, Buckinghamshire, France (Dieppe, Rouen, Paris, Tours, Poitiers, Angoulême, Bordeaux, Arcachon, Pau, Bagnères-de-Bigorre, and Dinan in Brittany), Spain and Germany. Mary was engaged in 1871 to the poet Philip Bourke Marston, but later that year she died of tuberculosis in Normandy.

After Mary's death, Nesbit and her mother settled for three years at Halstead Hall, Halstead, north-west Kent, a location that inspired The Railway Children, although the distinction has also been claimed by the Derbyshire town of New Mills.

When Nesbit was 17, the family moved back to Lewisham in south-east London. There is a Lewisham Council plaque to her at 28 Elswick Road.

In 1877, at the age of 18, Nesbit met the bank clerk Hubert Bland, her elder by three years. Seven months pregnant, she married Bland on 22 April 1880, but did not initially live with him, as Bland remained with his mother. Their marriage was tumultuous. Early on, Nesbit found that another woman, Maggie Doran, who lived with his mother, believed she was Hubert's fiancée and had likewise borne him a child.

Nesbit's children by Bland were Paul Cyril Bland (1880–1940), to whom The Railway Children was dedicated, Mary Iris Bland (1881–1965), who married John Austin D. Phillips in 1907, and Fabian Bland (1885–1900).

A more serious blow came in 1886, when she discovered that her friend Alice Hoatson was pregnant by him. She had previously agreed to adopt Hoatson's child and allow Hoatson to live with her as their housekeeper. After she discovered the truth, she and her husband quarrelled violently and she suggested that Hoatson and the baby, Rosamund, should leave; her husband threatened to leave Edith if she disowned the baby and its mother.

Hoatson remained with them as a housekeeper and secretary and became pregnant by Bland again 13 years later. Edith again adopted Hoatson's child, John. Bland's two children by Alice Hoatson, whom Edith adopted, were Rosamund Edith Nesbit Hamilton, later Bland (1886–1950), who married Clifford Dyer Sharp on 16 October 1909, and to whom The Book of Dragons was dedicated; and John Oliver Wentworth Bland (1899–1946), to whom The House of Arden and Five Children and It were dedicated.

Nesbit's son Fabian died aged 15 after a tonsil operation. Nesbit felt guilt over this, having fed him shortly before the general anaesthetic and then leaving him unattended afterwards, not realising that he might choke to death on regurgitated food. She subsequently dedicated several books to him, including The Story of the Treasure Seekers and its sequels. Nesbit's adopted daughter Rosamund collaborated with her on Cat Tales.

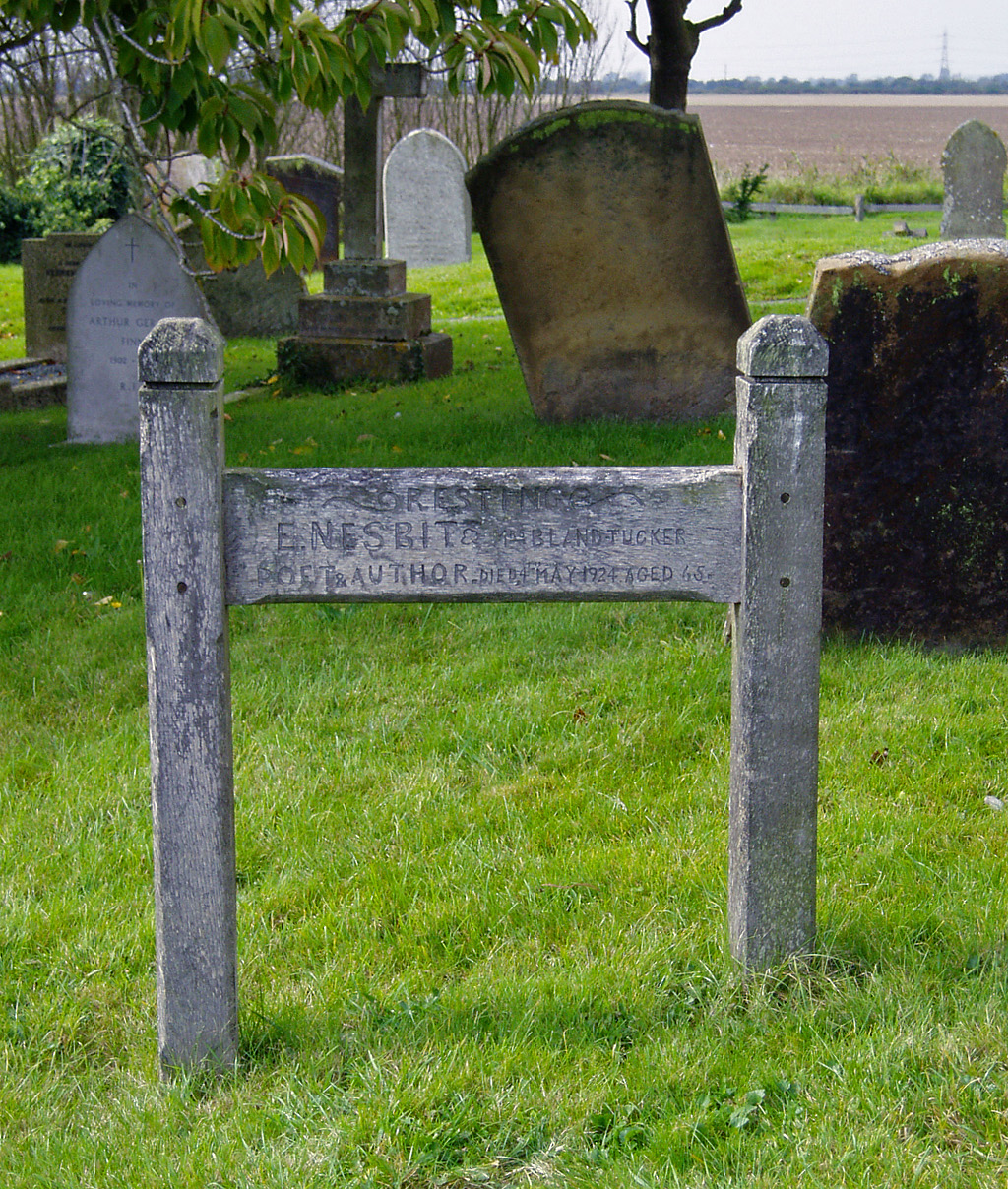
E. Nesbit's grave in St Mary in the Marsh’s churchyard bears a wooden marker by her second husband, Thomas Terry Tucker. There is also a memorial plaque to her inside the church.

Nesbit admired the artist and Marxian socialist William Morris. Nesbit and Bland dallied with the Social Democratic Federation, but found it too radical. The couple became founding members of the Fabian Society in 1884,—after which their son Fabian was named. They jointly edited its journal Today. From 1884 until the late 1890s, Nesbit and Bland co-authored adult fiction using the joint pseudonym "Fabian Bland". Nesbit was a prolific lecturer and writer on socialism in the 1880s. She was a guest speaker at the London School of Economics, which had been founded by other Fabian Society members.

Nesbit lived from 1899 to 1920 at Well Hall, Eltham, in south-east London, which makes fictional appearances in several of her books, such as The Red House. From 1911 she kept a second home on the Sussex Downs at Crowlink, Friston, East Sussex. She and her husband entertained many friends, colleagues and admirers at Well Hall.

On 20 February 1917, some three years after Bland died, Nesbit married Thomas "the Skipper" Tucker in Woolwich, where he was captain of the Woolwich Ferry.

Although she was the family breadwinner and has the father in The Railway Children declare that "[g]irls are just as clever as boys, and don't you forget it!", Nesbit did not champion women's rights. "She opposed the cause of women's suffrage—mainly, she claimed, because women could swing Tory, thus harming the Socialist cause."

Commenting on the 2022 reissue of The Railway Children and The House of Arden, The New Yorker says, "Both books, like much of Nesbit's work, are episodic and sometimes picaresque, shrugging off the moralizing that was native to young people’s literature of the time, in favour of privileging a child’s logic and point of view. [...] And, most crucially, both books are constructed from a blueprint that is also a kind of reënactment [sic] of the author's own childhood: an idyll torn up at its roots by the exigencies of illness, loss, and grief."

Towards the end of her life, Nesbit moved first to Crowlink, then with her husband to two conjoined properties that were Royal Flying Corps buildings, "Jolly Boat" and "Long Boat", at Jesson, St Mary's Bay, New Romney, Kent. Nesbit lived in "Jolly Boat" and the Skipper in "Long Boat". Nesbit died in "Long Boat", in 1924, probably from lung cancer (she "smoked incessantly"), and was buried in the churchyard of St Mary in the Marsh. Her husband Thomas died at the same address on 17 May 1935. Edith's son Paul Bland was an executor of Thomas Tucker's will.

== Writing ==
=== Career ===
Nesbit's first published works were poems. She was under 20 in March 1878, when the monthly magazine Good Words printed her poem "Under the Trees". In all she published about 40 books for children, including novels, storybooks and picture books. Works of William Shakespeare adapted by her for children have been translated.

She also published almost as many books jointly with others. With her husband she co-wrote fiction under the pseudonym "Fabian Bland" from 1884 until the late 1890s. One of these joint novels, The Prophet's Mantle, (1885) was inspired by the life of Peter Kropotkin in London. Nesbit's biographer Julia Briggs calls it a "book with a strikingly ingenious and complex plot". It received favourable reviews upon its publication, and appears to have sold steadily. After this, Bland concentrated on his journalism and political writings, while Nesbit's success as a children's author grew.

=== 2011 plagiarism allegation ===
In 2011, a book was published by the granddaughter of Ada J. Graves that suggested that Nesbit had "plagiarised" parts of the plot of The Railway Children from The House by the Railway by Graves. It was asserted that the Graves book had appeared in 1896, nine years prior to The Railway Children, and various similarities between the two books were identified. Subsequent studies disagreed with that conclusion: Online magazine Tor.com discovered that although the Graves book was part of a series started in 1896, that particular book wasn't published until 1906, so both books had actually been released in 1906. Some other similarities were also suggested to be mere coincidences, although it was acknowledged that Nesbit sometimes repeated plot elements in her own books and also used ideas from others, such as H. G. Wells.

=== Legacy and influence ===
Nesbit's biographer Julia Briggs calls her "the first modern writer for children", who "helped to reverse the great tradition of children's literature inaugurated by Lewis Carroll, George MacDonald and Kenneth Grahame, in turning away from their secondary worlds to the tough truths to be won from encounters with things-as-they-are, previously the province of adult novels". Briggs also credits Nesbit with inventing the children's adventure story. Noël Coward was an admirer. In a letter to an early biographer, Noel Streatfeild wrote, "She had an economy of phrase and an unparalleled talent for evoking hot summer days in the English countryside."

Among Nesbit's best-known books are The Story of the Treasure Seekers (1899) and The Wouldbegoods (1901), which tell of the Bastables, a middle-class family fallen on relatively hard times. The Railway Children is also popularised by a 1970 film version. Gore Vidal called the time-travel book, The Story of the Amulet, one where "Nesbit's powers of invention are at their best." Her children's writing also included plays and collections of verse.

Nesbit has been cited as the creator of modern children's fantasy. Her innovations placed realistic contemporary children in real-world settings with magical objects (which would now be classed as contemporary fantasy) and adventures and sometimes travel to fantastic worlds. This influenced directly or indirectly many later writers, including P. L. Travers (of Mary Poppins), Edward Eager, Diana Wynne Jones and J. K. Rowling. C. S. Lewis too paid heed to her in the Narnia series and mentions the Bastable children in The Magician's Nephew, which, in its scenes of Jadis (a.k.a. the White Witch) in 19th century London, borrows from a similar sequences in Nesbit's The Story of the Amulet.

=== Use of Nesbit's characters by later writers ===
Science fiction and fantasy writer Michael Moorcock adopted Nesbit's character of Oswald Bastable for a trilogy of steampunk novels beginning with The Warlord of the Air.

Five Children and It has had a number of continuation novels by later writers.

== Legacy ==
=== Places ===
- Edith Nesbit Walk and cycleway runs along the south side of Well Hall Pleasaunce in Eltham.
- Lee Green, also in south-east London, has Edith Nesbit Gardens.
- A 200-metre footpath in Grove Park south-east London, between Baring Road and Reigate Road, is named Railway Children Walk after the novel, as is one in Oxenhope, a film location on the Keighley and Worth Valley Railway used in the 1970 film.
- There is a Nesbit Road in St Mary's Bay, Romney Marsh, where Nesbit's home Long Boat & Jolly Boat stands.
- Nesbit House, a care home at Badgers Mount, Kent, is located near Halstead Hall where Edith Nesbit lived when she was young.

=== Other legacy ===
- Actress Judy Parfitt portrayed Nesbit in the 1972–1973 miniseries The Edwardians
- The Edith Nesbit Society was founded in 1996 with Dame Jacqueline Wilson as president.
- In The Guardian in 2001, Francis Spufford placed The Story of the Amulet first on his list of greatest children's books.
- A. S. Byatt's 2009 novel The Children's Book is inspired partly by Nesbit, who appears as a character along with Kenneth Grahame and J. M. Barrie.
- Nesbit's life inspired a one-act, one-woman play, Larks and Magic, by Alison Neil, in 2018.
- Several of Nesbit's horror short stories were adapted into the anthology play The Shadow in the Dark by Oliver Giggins and Ash Pryce, which also drew on elements of Nesbit's own life and fears taken from her autobiographical writings. The show premiered at the Edinburgh Horror Festival in 2023. Oliver Giggins followed it up with two further adaptations of Nesbit ghost stories, with The Ebony Frame (based on "The Ebony Frame, From The Dead" and "Uncle Abraham's Romance") in 2024 and The Lady In White (based on The White Lady) in 2025.
- American children's book author Edward Eager considered Nesbit the best children's author of all time; his books have been compared to Nesbit's and his characters are often fans of her work.
- Woman of Stone, the Christmas Eve 2024 episode of the BBC's 'A Ghost Story for Christmas' strand, is an adaptation of Nesbit's horror story Man-Size in Marble. The film, written and directed by Mark Gatiss, features Celia Imrie as Nesbit.

== Biographies ==
Aside from an episode of the BBC's 'A Ghost Story for Christmas' from her autobiographical Long Ago When I was Young (published 1966), Nesbit has been the subject of five biographies.

- Doris Langley Moore E. Nesbit, 1933
- Noel Streatfeild, Magic and the Magician: E. Nesbit and her Children’s Books, 1958
- Julia Briggs, A Woman of Passion, 1987
- Elisabeth Galvin, The Extraordinary Life of E. Nesbit, 2018
- Eleanor Fitzsimons, The Life and Loves of E Nesbit, 2019

== Works ==
=== Novels for children ===
==== Bastable series ====
- 1899 The Story of the Treasure Seekers
- 1901 The Wouldbegoods
- 1904 New Treasure Seekers

===== Notes =====
The Complete History of the Bastable Family (1928) is a posthumous omnibus of the three Bastable novels, but does not include the four stories appearing in the 1905 collection Oswald Bastable and Others. The Bastables also feature in the 1902 adult novel The Red House.

==== Psammead series ====
- 1902 Five Children and It
- 1904 The Phoenix and the Carpet
- 1906 The Story of the Amulet

==== House of Arden series ====
- 1908 The House of Arden
- 1909 Harding's Luck

==== Other children's novels ====
- 1906 The Railway Children
- 1907 The Enchanted Castle
- 1910 The Magic City
- 1911 The Wonderful Garden
- 1913 Wet Magic

=== Novels for adults ===
==== As Fabian Bland ====
- The Prophet's Mantle. Serialised, Weekly Dispatch, 3 August–14 December 1884, published 1889
- The Hour before Day. Serialised, Weekly Dispatch, 1885
- Something Wrong. Serialised, Weekly Dispatch, 7 March to 4 July 1886
- The Marden Mystery (rare: few if any copies survive)

==== As E. Nesbit ====
- 1893 Her Marriage Lines. Serialised, Weekly Dispatch, 1893
- 1898 The Secret of Kyriels
- 1902 The Red House (featuring the Bastables from the children's books featuring them)
- 1906 The Incomplete Amorist
- 1909 Salome and the Head (a.k.a. The House with No Address)
- 1909 Daphne in Fitzroy Street
- 1911 Dormant (a.k.a. Rose Royal in the US)
- 1916 The Incredible Honeymoon
- 1922 The Lark

==== Notes ====
Few copies of The Secret of Kyriels survive.

=== Stories and storybooks for children ===
- 1887 The Pixies Garden
- 1891 "The Pilot", poem, picture book(?), OCLC 905335060
- 1892 Father Christmas: The Children's Casket of Pictures
- 1894 Miss Mischief
- 1895 Tick Tock, Tales of the Clock
- 1895 Pussy cat
- 1895 Doggy Tales
- 1896 The Prince, Two Mice and Some Kitchen-Maids. Father Christmas: The Children's Treasury of Pictures and Stories (1892)
- 1897 The Children's Shakespeare
- 1897 Royal Children of English History
- 1897 Tales Told in the Twilight (story included in an anthology)
- 1898 The Book of Dogs
- 1899 Pussy and Doggy Tales
- 1901 The Book of Dragons (stories that appeared in The Strand, 1899) (Note: The Book of Dragons (1901). This comprised The Seven Dragons, a 7-part serial, and an eighth story, all published 1899 in The Strand Magazine, with a ninth story, "The Last of the Dragons" (posthumous, 1925). It appeared in 1972 as The Complete Book of Dragons and in 1975 as The Last of the Dragons and Some Others. The original title was then used, with contents augmented by "The Last of the Dragons" and material contemporary to the reissue. The title Seven Dragons and Other Stories recurred for a latter-day Nesbit collection.)
- 1901 Nine Unlikely Tales
- 1902 The Revolt of the Toys
- 1903 The Rainbow Queen and Other Stories
- 1903 Playtime Stories
- 1904 The Story of Five Rebellious Dolls
- 1904 Cat Tales (by Nesbit and her daughter Rosamund E. Nesbit Bland)
- 1905 Oswald Bastable and Others (includes four Bastable stories)
- 1905 Pug Peter, King of Mouseland
- 1907 Beautiful Stories from Shakespeare (reprint of The Children's Shakespeare, 1895)
- 1908 The Old Nursery Stories
- 1912 The Magic World
- 1925 Five of Us—and Madeline (posthumously assembled and edited by Rosamund E. Nesbit Bland, containing the title novel and two short stories perhaps completed by Nesbit)

=== Short fiction for adults ===
==== As Fabian Bland ====
- "Psychical Research". Longman's Magazine, December 1884
- "The Fabric of a Vision". Argosy, March 1885
- "An Angel Unawares". Weekly Dispatch, 9 August 1885
- "Desperate Conspirator". Weekly Dispatch, 15 May 1887
- "A Pot of Money". Weekly Dispatch, 21 August 1887
- "Christmas Roses". Weekly Dispatch, 25 December 1887
- "High Social Position". Weekly Dispatch, 8 July 1888
- "Mind and Money". Weekly Dispatch, 16 September 1888
- "Getting into Society". Weekly Dispatch, 30 September 1888
- "A Drama of Exile". Weekly Dispatch, 21 October 1888
- "A Pious Fraud". Weekly Dispatch, 11 November 1888
- "Her First Appearance". Weekly Dispatch, 16 December 1888
- "Which Wins?" Murray's Magazine, December 1888
- "Only a Joke". Longman's Magazine, August 1889
- "The Golden Girl". Weekly Dispatch, 21 December 1890

==== As E. Bland ====
- "The Third Drug", Strand Magazine, February 1908 (a.k.a. "The Three Drugs")

==== As E. Nesbit ====
- "Uncle Abraham's Romance". Illustrated London News, 26 September 1891
- "The Ebony Frame". Longman's Magazine, October 1891
- "Hurst of Hurstcote", 1893
- "The Butler in Bohemia" (by Nesbit and Oswald Barron), OCLC 72479308, 1894
- "A Strayed Sheep". Thetford & Watton Times and People's Weekly Journal, 2 June 1894 (with Oswald Barron)
- "The Secret of Monsieur Roche Aymon". Atalanta Magazine, October 1894 (with Oswald Barron)
- "The Letter in Brown Ink". Windsor Magazine, August 1899
- "'Thirteen Ways Home", 1901
- "These Little Ones", 1909
- "The Aunt and the Editor". North Star and Farmers' Chronicle, 15 June 1909
- "To the Adventurous", 1923

=== Short story collections for adults ===
- Grim Tales (horror stories), 1893
  - "The Ebony Frame", "John Charrington's Wedding", "Uncle Abraham's Romance", "The Mystery of the Semi-Detached", "From the Dead", "Man-Size in Marble", "The Mass for the Dead"
- Something Wrong (horror stories), 1893
- In Homespun (10 stories "written in an English dialect" of South Kent and Sussex), 1896
- The Literary Sense (18 stories), 1903
- Man and Maid (10 stories), 1906 (some supernatural stories) (Note: According to John Clute, "Most of Nesbit's supernatural fiction" contains short stories "assembled in four collections"; namely, Man and Maid and the three noted here as containing horror stories.)
- Fear (horror stories), 1910
- Collected Supernatural Stories, 2000
  - "Dormant" ("Rose Royal"), "Man-size in Marble", "The Detective", "No. 17", "John Charrington's Wedding", "The Blue Rose", "The Haunted House", "The House With No Address" ("Salome and the Head"), "The Haunted Inheritance", "The House of Silence", "The Letter in Brown Ink", "The Shadow", "The New Samson", "The Pavilion"
- From the Dead: The Complete Weird Stories of E Nesbit, 2005
  - "Introduction" (by S. T. Joshi), "John Charrington's Wedding", "The Ebony Frame", "The Mass for the Dead", "From the Dead", "Uncle Abraham's Romance", "The Mystery of the Semi-Detached", "Man-Size in Marble", "Hurst of Hurstcote", "The Power of Darkness", "The Shadow", "The Head", "The Three Drugs", "In the Dark", "The New Samson", "Number 17", "The Five Senses", "The Violet Car", "The Haunted House", "The Pavilion", "From My School-Days", "In the Dark", "The Mummies at Bordeaux"
- The Power of Darkness: Tales of Terror, 2006
  - "Man-Size in Marble", "Uncle Abraham's Romance", "From the Dead", "The Three Drugs", "The Violet Car", "John Charrington's Wedding", "The Pavilion", "Hurst of Hurstcote", "In the Dark", "The Head", "The Mystery of the Semi-detached", "The Ebony Frame", "The Five Senses", "The Shadow", "The Power of Darkness", "The Haunted Inheritance", "The Letter in Brown Ink", "The House of Silence", "The Haunted House", "The Detective"
- Dark Tales in Winter, 2021
  - "The Shadow" adapted for stage by Matt Beames and Hannah Torrance.

=== Non-fiction ===
==== As Fabian Bland ====
No pieces yet traced

==== As E. Nesbit ====
- "Women and Socialism: from the Middle-Class Point of View". Justice, 4 and 11 April 1885
- "Women and Socialism: A Working Woman's Point of View". Justice, 25 April 1885
- Wings and the Child, or The Building of Magic Cities, 1913
- Long Ago When I Was Young (originally a serial, 'My School-Days: Memories of Childhood', in Girl's Own Paper 1896–1897) Originally appearing as "My School-Days: Memories of Childhood" in The Girl's Own Paper between October 1896 and September 1897, Long Ago When I Was Young finally took book form in 1966, some 40 years after Nesbit's death, with an introduction by Noel Streatfeild and some two dozen pen-and-ink drawings by Edward Ardizzone. The twelve chapters reproduce the instalments.

=== Poetry ===
- "A Lovers' Petition". Good Words, 17 August 1881
- "Absolution". Longman's Magazine, August 1882
- "Possibilities". Argosy, July 1884
- "Until the Dawn". Justice, 21 February 1885
- "Socialist Spring Song". Today, June 1885
- "The Dead to the Living". Gentleman's Magazine
- "Waiting". Justice, July 1885
- "Two Voices". Justice, August 1885
- "1857-1885". Justice, 22 August 1885
- "The Wife of All Ages". Justice, 18 September 1885
- "The Time of Roses", undated (c. 1890)
- 1886 "Lays and Legends"
- 1887 "The Lily and the Cross"
- 1887 "Justice for Ireland!". Warminster Gazette, 12 March 1887
- 1887 "The Ballad of Ferencz Renyi: Hungary, 1848". Longman's Magazine, April 1887
- 1887 "The Message of June". Longman's Magazine, June 1887
- 1887 "The Last Envoy"
- 1887 "The Star of Bethlehem"
- 1887 "Devotional Verses"
- 1888 "The Better Part, and Other Poems"
- 1888 "Landscape and Song"
- 1888 "The Message of the Dove"
- 1888 "All Round the Year"
- 1888 "Leaves of Life"
- 1889 "Corals and Sea Songs"
- 1890 "Songs of Two Seasons"
- 1892 "Sweet Lavender"
- 1892 "Lays and Legends", 2nd ed.
- 1895 "Rose Leaves"
- 1895 "A Pomander of Verse"
- 1898 "Songs of Love and Empire"
- 1901 "To Wish You Every Joy"
- 1905 "The Rainbow and the Rose"
- 1908 "Jesus in London"
- 1883–1908 "Ballads and Lyrics of Socialism"
- 1911 "Ballads and Verses of the Spiritual Life"
- 1912 "Garden Poems"
- 1915 "Prayer in Time of War"
- 1922 "Many Voices"

=== Songs ===
- 1899 Slave Song (Chappell), OCLC 60194453
