= Absolute Zero (disambiguation) =

Absolute zero is the temperature at which entropy reaches its minimum value.

Absolute Zero may also refer to:

- Absolute Zero (novel), a 1978 children's novel by Helen Cresswell
- Absolute Zero (video game), a 1995 computer game for MS-DOS and Macintosh
- Absolute Zero, a 2000 compilation album released by UK record label Charrm
- Absolute Zero, a 2006 American TV disaster movie starring Jeff Fahey and Erika Eleniak
- Absolute Zero, a 2013 album by Little Green Cars
- Absolute Zero, a Japanese bonus track from the Faith No More album King for a Day
- "Gone Sovereign"/"Absolute Zero", a song by Stone Sour
- Absolute Zero, a hero in the card game Sentinels of the Multiverse
- Absolute Zero, a webcomic prequel to the film Interstellar
- Absolute Zero, a 2019 album by Bruce Hornsby

== See also ==
- Kjærlighetens kjøtere (Zero Kelvin), a 1995 Norwegian film
