= Bug Alert =

- The title card from the first and second series
- Created by: Two Sides TV
- Written by: Peter Eyre and Francis Wright
- Starring: Rebecca Nagan; Alison McGowan; Sarah Wright; Francis Wright; Joe Greco; Richard Coombs; Jeremy Stockwell
- Country of origin: United Kingdom
- No. of series: 3
- No. of episodes: 78

Production
- Executive producer: Catherine Robins

Original release
- Network: GMTV (Series 1-2); Channel 4 (Series 3)
- Release: 1996 – 2000

Bug Alert is a British children's television series, first shown on GMTV in September 1996. It featured the antics of a range of bug-like characters who lived in the kitchen of an unnamed house. These creatures apparently only came out when the resident humans were "not about." In the final series, the characters moved out of the house and opened a somewhat seedy restaurant ("Bug Bites") where they set about serving Weasel Curry to their regular clientele. 78 episodes were made in total and were repeated regularly on GMTV, Tiny Living and Channel 4 between 1996 and 2004.

After the first two series, the show format was bought by Channel 4, which commissioned 26 further episodes. These, and the previous series, were aired in their weekend morning slot. The show was characterised by its somewhat adult references and themes, most of which went above the heads of watching children.

The 78 30-minute scripts were co-written by the director Peter Eyre and the main puppeteer, Francis Wright. The executive producer was Catherine Robins of Two Sides TV.

== Characters ==
=== Main characters ===
- Grub Bug: The father figure and chef of the family. Pompous, red and fat, he had a rather military manner and a fondness for popping down to his shed to "tend his vegetables". He was sensitive about his incipient balding and once sought to hide it under a ginger wig. Very fond of Mystic Mug, they holidayed together at Frinton-on-sea.
- Mystic Mug Bug aka Mystic Mug: Originally loosely modelled on celebrity fortune teller "Mystic Meg", her metier was crystal ball reading, where (in the first two series) she would retail "Mystic Mug Bug's Amazing Facts". Increasingly eccentric as the series progressed, she often teetered uncertainly on the edge of sanity.
- Doodle Bug: An emotional Mr. Fix-it and artist who would design and build all manner of gadgets with which to wreak havoc over a twenty-minute time slot. Something of a sadist.
- Plug Bug: Doodle Bug's best friend. He is a craven coward and a little flowery in nature, but stubbornly protective of his sink when it comes to what everyone puts down it. Good to his mother.
- Buggins: Orange worm-like creature. Irritatingly enthusiastic and jolly. Regularly beaten into line by the previous two, he generally came up smiling...until the next time.
- Grunge and Slopp: A pair of dirty, green, hairy hippie types who told jokes and sang songs. Very rarely referred to by name. They also occasionally got involved in the main action, often playing pranks on the other characters.
- Gorgon and Zola: A husband and wife team of fuzzy worms. Aggressive to all and sundry, they were also resident jokesters. Background dancers for most of the songs.

=== Minor characters ===
- The Customer: Arrived in series 3. Real name; Roy, he lived in a mobile home on the side of the A3. Spent a lot of time in the café but rarely actually seemed to eat anything.
- The Health Inspector: Came and went in the course of one episode. Got stuck to Grub Bug and, after various threats, posted a glowing report on the café.
- The Genie: Came, offered wishes, left.
- Baxter: Plug Bug's dear chum, a practical joker. Came unstuck when he played one joke too many on Mystic Mug. Last seen disappearing down a large hole.
- Bernard: A robot built by Doodle Bug with a nice/nasty switch on his back. Brought havoc over two episodes.
- Henri: A French chef to whom Mystic Mug took rather a shine. Tied up Grub Bug and then came to a violent end.
- Doodle Bug's Granny: Appeared in Series 2, transpired it was Doodle Bug dressed up all along.
- Squelch: Buggins' brother. So called because that was the noise people tended to make when he sat on them.

== Regular strands ==
- Raid the Fridge: A short interstitial sequence where Grub Bug would show how to make some unspeakable culinary art.
- In the Bin: Ditto, but involving Doodle Bug doing some arts and crafts and making something out of the items he finds in his bin.
- Through the Washing Machine/Notice Board: Short sequence where some child demonstrated something of little interest.
- Through the Cat Flap: Short sequences narrated by Rebecca Nagan shot from a Scottish cat's point of view as she tramped about observing humans; she also went to locations across the UK.
- Mystic Mug Bug's Amazing Facts: Series 1 and 2 only. Mystic Mug presents items of trivia related to the day's topics.

== Media Releases ==
- Letters, Colours and Animals VHS (1997)
- Numbers and other stories VHS (2001)
- Numbers and Liquid DVD (2004)
- Bug Alert Volume One DVD (2009)
- Bug Alert Volume Two DVD (2009)
- Bug Alert Volume Three DVD (2009)

== List of episodes ==
=== Series 1 (1996) ===
| No. overall | No. in series | Title | Original release date |
|---|---|---|---|
| 1 | 1 | "Numbers" | 1996 |
| 2 | 2 | "Liquid" | 1996 |
| 3 | 3 | "Animals" | 1996 |
| 4 | 4 | "Letters" | 1996 |
| 5 | 5 | "Shapes" | 1996 |
| 6 | 6 | "Where We Live" | 1996 |
| 7 | 7 | "Big and Small" | 1996 |
| 8 | 8 | "Time" | 1996 |
| 9 | 9 | "Clothes" | 1996 |
| 10 | 10 | "Colours" | 1996 |
| 11 | 11 | "Transport" | 1996 |
| 12 | 12 | "Hot and Cold" | 1996 |
| 13 | 13 | "Taste and Smell" | 1996 |
| 14 | 14 | "Families" | 1996 |
| 15 | 15 | "Machines" | 1996 |
| 16 | 16 | "What’s It Made From?" | 1996 |
| 17 | 17 | "Light and Dark" | 1996 |
| 18 | 18 | "Save The Planet" | 1996 |
| 19 | 19 | "Over and Under" | 1996 |
| 20 | 20 | "Growing" | 1996 |
| 21 | 21 | "Food" | 1996 |
| 22 | 22 | "Music and Movement" | 1996 |
| 23 | 23 | "Weather" | 1996 |
| 24 | 24 | "Jobs" | 1996 |
| 25 | 25 | "Speed" | 1996 |
| 26 | 26 | "Make Believe" | 1996 |

=== Series 2 (1997) ===
| No. overall | No. in series | Title | Original release date |
|---|---|---|---|
| 27 | 1 | "Minerals and Mining" | 1997 |
| 28 | 2 | "School" | 1997 |
| 29 | 3 | "How My Body Works" | 1997 |
| 30 | 4 | "Puzzles and Games" | 1997 |
| 31 | 5 | "Festivals and Celebrations" | 1997 |
| 32 | 6 | "Old and New" | 1997 |
| 33 | 7 | "Towns and Cities" | 1997 |
| 34 | 8 | "Kings and Queens" | 1997 |
| 35 | 9 | "Staying Healthy" | 1997 |
| 36 | 10 | "Feeling Ill" | 1997 |
| 37 | 11 | "Outer Space" | 1997 |
| 38 | 12 | "Feelings" | 1997 |
| 39 | 13 | "Reptiles" | 1997 |
| 40 | 14 | "Explorers" | 1997 |
| 41 | 15 | "Hobbies" | 1997 |
| 42 | 16 | "Minibeasts" | 1997 |
| 43 | 17 | "Under the Sea" | 1997 |
| 44 | 18 | "Telling the Truth" | 1997 |
| 45 | 19 | "Dinosaurs" | 1997 |
| 46 | 20 | "Birds" | 1997 |
| 47 | 21 | "Friends and Friendship" | 1997 |
| 48 | 22 | "The Countryside" | 1997 |
| 49 | 23 | "Likes and Dislikes" | 1997 |
| 50 | 24 | "Holidays" | 1997 |
| 51 | 25 | "Fashion" | 1997 |
| 52 | 26 | "Loud and Quiet" | 1997 |

=== Series 3 (2000) ===
| No. overall | No. in series | Title | Original release date |
|---|---|---|---|
| 53 | 1 | "Homes" | 2000 |
| 54 | 2 | "Computers" | 2000 |
| 55 | 3 | "Babies" | 2000 |
| 56 | 4 | "Pantomime" | 2000 |
| 57 | 5 | "Robots" | 2000 |
| 58 | 6 | "Treasure Hunt" | 2000 |
| 59 | 7 | "Adverts" | 2000 |
| 60 | 8 | "Clubs" | 2000 |
| 61 | 9 | "Food" | 2000 |
| 62 | 10 | "Ghosts" | 2000 |
| 63 | 11 | "Wishes" | 2000 |
| 64 | 12 | "Sports" | 2000 |
| 65 | 13 | "Sleep" | 2000 |
| 66 | 14 | "Songs" | 2000 |
| 67 | 15 | "Detectives" | 2000 |
| 68 | 16 | "Secrets" | 2000 |
| 69 | 17 | "Parties" | 2000 |
| 70 | 18 | "Doubles" | 2000 |
| 71 | 19 | "Help" | 2000 |
| 72 | 20 | "Truth and Lies" | 2000 |
| 73 | 21 | "Spring Cleaning" | 2000 |
| 74 | 22 | "Stories" | 2000 |
| 75 | 23 | "Tricks" | 2000 |
| 76 | 24 | "Christmas" | 2000 |
| 77 | 25 | "Newspapers" | 2000 |
| 78 | 26 | "Sticky" | 2000 |
