= The Return of the Psammead =

- Based on: Five Children and It by E. Nesbit
- Written by: Helen Cresswell
- Directed by: Marilyn Fox
- Starring: Toby Ufindell-Phillips: Laura Clarke; Leonard Kirby; Vicci Avery
- Theme music composer: Michael Omer
- Country of origin: United Kingdom
- Original language: English
- No. of series: 1
- No. of episodes: 6

Production
- Producer: Richard Callanan
- Running time: 26 minutes

Original release
- Network: BBC1
- Release: 6 January – 10 February 1993

The Return of the Psammead is a 1993 TV series directed by Marilyn Fox and starring Toby Ufindell-Phillips, Laura Clarke, Leonard Kirby and Vicci Avery. The Return of the Psammead was a six-part British television series that aired on BBC from 6 January to 10 February 1993. It was written by Helen Cresswell and inspired by E. Nesbit's Five Children and It.

== Plot ==
The story follows four children (George, Ellie, Pip, and Lucy) who are sent to stay with their Great-Aunt Marchmont in the English countryside during the early 20th century while their younger siblings recover from scarlet fever. When they arrive at their aunt's estate, they stumble upon the Psammead, a cranky sand fairy that grants wishes. It does not take long for the children to realize that this fairy will make any wish come true, even the ones they toss out without much thought, sparking a string of funny and chaotic adventures. Some standout moments include Ellie wishing for a twin, the kids zipping 80 years into the future to 1993 (where they encounter modern gadgets and a disco party), and their aunt wishing to feel young again, which turns her into a playful, childlike version of herself. Through all these wild escapades, the children have to deal with the unexpected fallout of their wishes while growing closer to their stern aunt, who gradually softens up.

== Cast ==
- Toby Ufindell-Phillips as George
- Laura Clarke as Ellie
- Leonard Kirby as Pip
- Vicci Avery as Lucy
- Polly Kemp as Bessie
- Frank Taylor as Mr. Dobbs
- Joanna Barrett as Lil Dawkins
- Simon Slater as Dawkins
- Francis Wright as The Psammead
- Anna Massey as Aunt Marchmont
- Calum MacPherson as Albert Dobbs
- Carol MacReady as Cook
- Anne Orwin as Mrs. Dobbs
- Neil Conrich as Policeman
- Colin Wyatt as Arthur
- Jodie Hartill as Stella Dawkins
- Linda Slade as Lady with baby
- Jessica James as Elderly Lady
- Nicola Maddock as Supermarket Checkout

== Production ==
The series has six episodes. Malcolm James was the visual effects designer. 30 students from the Salisbury educational institution Westwood St Thomas School participated in three days of filming of the television series at Dorchester. The 27 January 1993 episode had 4.90 million viewers.

== Reception ==
The Sydney Morning Herald reviewer Robin Oliver called The Return of the Psammead "three nicely acted episodes of utter enchantment" and "enchanting television of the highest quality". The director Roger Singleton-Turner found it to be "a clever sequel to the original, keeping very much to Nesbit's own style—and period".

== See also ==
- Five Children and It
- Five Children and It TV Series
- The Phoenix and the Carpet
