= Francis Wright (actor) =

English voice actor, puppeteer, and television presenter

Francis Wright (born 1958) is an English voice actor, puppeteer, and television presenter. He also teaches public speaking and communication skills.

== Early life ==
Wright was born in St John's Wood, the son of Dr Bedřich Bělohlávek and Joan Wright, and was registered under both names. His father was a Czech bookseller working in London, while his mother was a journalist then working for the BBC as a publicity officer, and both were authors. Wright was educated at Colet Court and St Paul's School, London, then studied drama, graduating with honours. He later noted “I decided to specialise in puppetry, which seemed to be a good way of never being typecast and/or doomed to a life mainly out of work.”

== Career ==
Wright's work on screen began with ITV's The Munch Bunch. After that, he portrayed a leading character in You and Me, a BBC Schools series, in which he played Dibs from 1983 until 1992.

His first feature film was Dragonslayer (1981), and in the mid-1980s he worked as a puppeteer on Spitting Image. He was also one of the puppeteers for Ludo in Labyrinth (1986) and created and voiced the Psammead for BBC Television in Five Children and It (1991), returning to the role in The Return of the Psammead (1993) and The Phoenix and the Carpet (1997), for which he also created the puppet of the Phoenix, a character which was voiced by David Suchet. In the 1990s he also worked on Wizadora, Mortimer and Arabel, Hotch Potch House, Jay's World, Gophers!, and The Spooks of Bottle Bay, playing Sam the Seagull in Beachcomber Bay and created the March Hare for the star-studded Alice in Wonderland (1999).

Wright played the Head in ITV's Art Attack (1990–2007), was Colin the bat and Lumpy in Grotbags (1991–1993), was both a writer and a performer for Bug Alert (1996–2000) and played Sweep in two series of the ITV children's show Sooty. He has also narrated two television series, B & B the Best for the BBC and Kitchen Showdown with Rosemary Shrager for ITV, and does voice-over work for commercials.

Outside show business, Wright teaches public speaking and communication skills. He was an elocution teacher for American Princess (2005) and Australian Princess (2006) and was hired to teach Paul O'Grady to "speak proper" on The Generation Game.
