= American Princess (2005 TV series) =

- Genre: Reality competition
- Presented by: Catherine Oxenberg
- Judges: Jean Broke-Smith; Paul Burrell
- Country of origin: United States
- Original language: English
- No. of seasons: 2
- No. of episodes: 14

Production
- Running time: 42 minutes
- Production company: ITV Studios

Original release
- Network: We TV
- Release: August 7, 2005 – October 7, 2007

American Princess is an American reality competition that aired on We TV from August 7, 2005 until October 7, 2007. It was hosted by Catherine Oxenberg with Jean Broke-Smith and Paul Burrell serving as judges. American Princess is based on the George Bernard Shaw play Pygmalion and Alan Jay Lerner's My Fair Lady in a modern setting, where twenty American women who are average, plain, and rather ill-mannered, are taken to London, England to master the finer arts of British society and be crowned "American Princess" and earn valuable prizes. But first, the women have to learn how to eat dinner, handle cutlery, serve tea, walk in high heels, dance, and act as a proper royal should be.

An Australian version called Australian Princess aired on Network 10, with Jackie O hosting and Broke-Smith and Burrell reprising their roles as judges alongside Jane Luedecke.
