= Jessica Fox =

Jessica Fox may refer to:

- Jessica Fox (actress) (born 1983), British actress
- Jessica Fox (canoeist) (born 1994), French-born, Australian Olympic slalom canoer
