= Mortimer and Arabel =

- Genre: Puppet comedy-drama
- Based on: Arabel's Raven by Joan Aiken
- Written by: Joan Aiken; Lizza Aiken
- Directed by: Roger Singleton-Turner; Vivienne Cozens
- Starring: Michael Bayliss; Martin Bridle; Richard Coombs; Peter Forbes; Barnaby Harrison; Ronnie Le Drew; Christopher Leith; Rebecca Nagan; Angie Passmore; Marie Phillips; Paul Rainbow; Rachel Riggs; Gillie Robic; Tim Rose; Heather Tobias; Mark Alexander Todd; Victoria Willing; Francis Wright
- Composer: Paul Reade
- Country of origin: United Kingdom
- Original language: English
- No. of series: 2
- No. of episodes: 36

Production
- Producer: Angela Beeching
- Running time: 15 minutes

Original release
- Network: BBC One
- Release: 15 November 1993 – 21 December 1994

Mortimer and Arabel is a BBC puppet comedy-drama series based on the book series of the same name by Joan Aiken that was aired on BBC One as part of the Children's BBC strand (as it was known before 4 October 1997) from 15 November 1993 to 21 December 1994. Some of the original books, which were illustrated by Sir Quentin Blake, had also first been seen as a part of the BBC's Jackanory programmes. The stories are about a four-year-old girl named Arabel Jones who adopts an injured raven that her Dad, a cab driver named Ebenezer Jones, brings home after finding him injured in the road and christens "Mortimer", but his only communication is to squawk "Nevermore!" when upset. The Jones family live at 6 Rainwater Crescent in Rumbury Town, London NW3½ where most of their neighbours, including Mr. Coughtrack, Mr. and Mrs. Hamstring and especially grumpy old Mr. Leggitt, cannot stand Mortimer due to all the chaos he causes, and it is always up to Arabel to keep Mortimer out of trouble, although he frequently causes chaotic upsets with his mischievous behaviour. A total of thirty-six fifteen-minute episodes were produced over four serials of varying length in two series.

Other characters include Arabel's Mum Martha Jones, Mr. Leggitt's accomplices Bill and Joe, Mayor Saddlejoy and his wife, the Town Hall's secretary Doreen, Sergeant (later Mayor, after Saddlejoy retired from his position at the end of the first series) Cutlink, P.C. Barnoff, Arabel's babysitter Chris Cross (who was the only one of the Joneses' neighbours to also have a fondness for Mortimer), Mr. Leggitt's pet pigeon Pianono, a Scottish odd-job woman named Flo (known as "Have-A-Go Flo" and "In-The-Know Flo" by Mr. Leggitt's accomplices and "Odd-Job Flo" by Ebenezer), an Indian singer named Seleena, a Greek Professor from the island of Pollyargos, an American millionaire named Mr. Bonny, the Duchess of Skew, a farmer named Mr. Westropp, a herd of Jersey cows named Daisy, Lazy and Maisie, Ebenezer's Mum Granny Jones, Granny Jones's pet cat Augustus, Ebenezer's evil cousin Perce Jones, and a ghost named Sir Humphrey Burbage who haunted Mallards' Bank (a parody of Lloyds Bank, which was managed by a man named Mr. Sterrett and his assistant Miss Gracie, and cleaned by a woman named Mrs. Catchpenny) every night at Christmas until Mortimer and Arabel returned his gold, which he had hidden behind a loose brick with an "H" on in the Tower of London (where he was a prisoner during the day) while he was alive, but he died owing Mallards' Bank a considerable debt.

== Series 1: Mortimer's Pocket (1993) ==
The first series was originally shown on BBC One on Mondays at 4:15 pm and Wednesdays at 4:20 pm between 15 November and 22 December 1993. This series was also released on VHS (BBCV 5249) under the same name as the show itself on 5 April 1994, but it is now out of print. However, both series were rereleased for download on the BBC Store in 2016 (with the second divided into its three respective parts).

No. overall	No. in series	Title	Original release date
1	1	"Part One"	15 November 1993
Arabel prepares a tea party for Mortimer and her father takes them to the playground.
2	2	"Part Two"	17 November 1993
After Mrs. Jones makes jam and leaves Mortimer unattended, he causes mayhem in the kitchen.
3	3	"Part Three"	22 November 1993
Bill and Joe hide the computer tapes.
4	4	"Part Four"	24 November 1993
Mrs. Jones faints, and while Arabel makes her tea, Mortimer burns his feathers on the hob. Mrs. Jones is worried about her husband's whereabouts, thinking he has been kidnapped.
5	5	"Part Five"	29 November 1993
Mortimer struggles with a burglar, and eats Mr. Jones's watch. Bill and Joe find a use for pogo sticks.
6	6	"Part Six"	1 December 1993
The Joneses' neighbours are up in arms about the damage done to their gardens. Mr. Leggitt suggests that Mortimer may be to blame.
7	7	"Part Seven"	6 December 1993
The Joneses decide what to do about the pirate at their door.
8	8	"Part Eight"	8 December 1993
Mortimer is taken to the Town Hall for questioning after releasing some dogs and swallowing a tape. Arabel hears on the radio that Mortimer is at the police station.
9	9	"Part Nine"	13 December 1993
Mortimer needs an X-ray, but manages to give Arabel the slip.
10	10	"Part Ten"	15 December 1993
A sulking Mortimer heads into action to investigate the tapes.
11	11	"Part Eleven"	20 December 1993
Sergeant Cutlink still thinks Mortimer has eaten the computer tape.
12	12	"Part Twelve"	22 December 1993
Arabel has lost her voice. Mrs. Jones wins the garden decorating competition by hanging tea cosies on bushes. Mortimer finds the master tape and the Joneses get the reward.

== Series 2 Part 1: Mortimer's Mine (October–November 1994) ==
The first part of the second series was originally shown on both Mondays and Wednesdays at 4:20 pm between 3 October and 9 November 1994.

No. overall	No. in series	Title	Original release date
13	1	"Part One"	3 October 1994
The Joneses have problems. Mr. Jones is poorly and the garden has a huge hole in it.
14	2	"Part Two"	5 October 1994
Mayor Cutlink receives news of a gift from Pollyargos. Meanwhile, Mortimer finds some dough for the hole.
15	3	"Part Three"	10 October 1994
Mortimer meets Seleena, a singer from India, and disposes of a telephone box, whilst Mrs. Jones gets a job at the Town Hall.
16	4	"Part Four"	12 October 1994
Mortimer finds some carpet and meets the Professor from Pollyargos, and Mayor Cutlink meets Mr. Bonny, a millionaire.
17	5	"Part Five"	17 October 1994
The present from Pollyargos is a problem to parents in the park, and Mrs. Jones has problems with cacti.
18	6	"Part Six"	19 October 1994
A large crack has developed in the Joneses' fireplace because the hole in the garden is growing, in spite of Mortimer's efforts.
19	7	"Part Seven"	24 October 1994
Bill and Joe audition for the song contest, and Mr. Leggitt gives them and Mortimer a surprise.
20	8	"Part Eight"	26 October 1994
Mr. Bonny decides to buy Tower Heights, in spite of the bats. Mortimer is keen to practise hitting the Professor's sculpture.
21	9	"Part Nine"	31 October 1994
Mrs. Jones has a bad day; Mortimer ruins her hat, then she finds out that Mr. Leggitt has escaped.
22	10	"Part Ten"	2 November 1994
Mortimer has a ride in Mr. Bonny's van and goes to the top of Tower Heights.
23	11	"Part Eleven"	7 November 1994
Preparations for the song contest and Mr. Bonny's stunt with Tower Heights are underway. Arabel is convinced that Mortimer knows what has happened to Mr. Jones's taxi.
24	12	"Part Twelve"	9 November 1994
It is the big day for Mortimer and Arabel, but unexpected things happen when Seleena hits the high notes and Mortimer hits Pianono, Mr. Leggitt's pigeon.

== Series 2 Part 2: May Day in Rumbury (November 1994) ==
The second series' second third was originally shown on Mondays at 4:00 pm and Wednesdays at 3:55 pm from 14 to 30 November 1994.

No. overall	No. in series	Title	Original release date
25	13	"May Day in Rumbury: Part One"	14 November 1994
Mayor Cutlink asks the Duchess of Skew how to arrange a traditional May Day Show.
26	14	"May Day in Rumbury: Part Two"	16 November 1994
Mr. Jones takes a herd of cows through the house and is found tidying up when Granny Jones makes a visit. Meanwhile, Mortimer builds a nest with his umbrella collection.
27	15	"May Day in Rumbury: Part Three"	21 November 1994
Granny Jones arrives early in Rumbury. Mayor Cutlink takes her to the Town Hall and tells her she is to be May Queen.
28	16	"May Day in Rumbury: Part Four"	23 November 1994
Granny Jones is having dreams and searches the books for a remedy.
29	17	"May Day in Rumbury: Part Five"	28 November 1994
May Day celebrations continue in Rumbury.
30	18	"May Day in Rumbury: Part Six"	30 November 1994
It is May Day in Rumbury, and the Duchess of Skew's Queen Anne brooch is missing.

== Series 2 Part 3: The Bank Ghost (December 1994) ==
The second series' final third was, again, shown on Mondays at 4:00 pm and Wednesdays at 3:55 pm, between 5 and 21 December 1994.

No. overall	No. in series	Title	Original release date
31	19	"The Bank Ghost: Part One"	5 December 1994
Mortimer is tired because he has been up all night guarding the Duke of Rumbury's ring and has shut Augustus, Granny Jones's cat, in a cupboard.
32	20	"The Bank Ghost: Part Two"	7 December 1994
Granny Jones does some Christmas baking, and Arabel and Mortimer make Christmas decorations for Mallards' Bank.
33	21	"The Bank Ghost: Part Three"	12 December 1994
The Duke of Rumbury's ring mysteriously disappears from Mallards' Bank.
34	22	"The Bank Ghost: Part Four"	14 December 1994
Mortimer is on night watch, trying to spot the ghost of Sir Humphrey Burbage.
35	23	"The Bank Ghost: Part Five"	19 December 1994
Mortimer and Arabel find Sir Humphrey Burbage's gold at the Tower of London.
36	24	"The Bank Ghost: Part Six"	21 December 1994
Mortimer chases Mr. Leggitt and Cousin Perce Jones from Mallards' Bank. The ghost of Sir Humphrey Burbage leaves a farewell present for Mortimer and Arabel in the bank.

== Literary nod to Poe’s “The Raven” ==
Mortimer’s cry of “Nevermore” is a deliberate reference to Edgar Allan Poe’s “The Raven”. Joan Aiken takes Poe’s dark, mournful refrain and reworks it as comic absurdity. In Poe’s poem, the word “Nevermore” expresses grief, memory and the permanence of loss. The raven’s repetition drives the narrator to despair, its tone gothic and tragic, filled with psychological torment.

In Arabel and Mortimer, Aiken reverses this, Mortimer’s “Nevermore” is a catchphrase used for comic effect, setting off chaos and misunderstanding rather than dread. Where Poe’s bird symbolises death and loss, Mortimer is a source of slapstick trouble and affectionate nonsense. Arabel adores him despite the havoc he causes, and his role is that of a comic counterpart to Poe’s harbinger of doom.

Aiken’s use of the same word connects her stories to one of literature’s most famous poems, but her purpose is parody. The echo of “Nevermore” acknowledges Poe’s influence while transforming it into playful humour for children.

A short note to prospective editors: Aiken borrows the line, not the mood, so treat the link as literary allusion rather than adaptation.

=== See also ===
“The Raven” Edgar Allan Poe
