= Australian Princess =

- Created by: Granada Productions
- Presented by: Jackie O
- Judges: Paul Burrell; Jane Luedecke; Jean Broke-Smith
- Country of origin: Australia
- Original language: English
- No. of episodes: 17

Production
- Running time: 60 minutes
- Production company: Granada Media Australia

Original release
- Network: Network Ten
- Release: 5 October 2005 – 2007

Australian Princess is an Australian reality television show that first premiered on Network 10 on 5 October 2005. It is produced by Granada Australia, who are responsible for other programs such as Dancing with the Stars, Australia's Next Top Model, and Merrick and Rosso Unplanned. It is an Australian version of American Princess.

The show also aired in the United Kingdom on ITV2, in Finland on SubTV, in Canada on W Network, in the United States on WE: Women's Entertainment, in the Middle East on MBC 4, and in Belgium on Vitaya.

The contestants were judged by Paul Burrell, Jane Luedecke (sister of Sarah Ferguson) and Jean Broke-Smith, along with various other guest judges. The two series of the show were hosted by Jackie O.

== Overview ==
Fuelled by the fairy tale story of Mary Donaldson who, in 2004, married Denmark's heir to the throne, Crown Prince Frederick, Australian Princess scoured the country to find 12 young Australian women and give them the journey of their lives.

Paul Burrell, former butler to Diana, Princess of Wales and footman in the Royal Household of Queen Elizabeth II, led a team of international experts, who attempted to shape these ordinary 'Aussie' girls into worldly sophisticated women ready to handle the challenges of being a young royal. The contestants took classes, met challenges and attempted to convince the judges that they have what it takes to mix in elite social circles both in Australia and the United Kingdom.

== Cast ==
=== Host ===
- Jackie O

=== Judges ===
- Paul Burrell
- Jane Luedecke
- Jean Broke-Smith

== Series one ==
The first season of Australian Princess was aired in late 2005 on Network Ten. Despite initial critical cynicism of the program's concept, it quickly gained cult status and was praised for the quality of its production, witty and often cringe-induced humour (one recalls a contestant's sobbing lament of the deaths of two icons she held dear – Diana, Princess of Wales, and Tupac Shakur).

Ally Mansell from the University of Wollongong and Danebank was announced the winner during the final show, which was aired in Australia on 23 November 2005. She was crowned a "princess" in the finale and won a prize package including a hand gilded tiara and the chance to be escorted to a gala ball by a real life Prince Charming in the United Kingdom.

The first series was released on DVD on 12 December 2005.

=== Contestants ===
- Zena Alliu, 20, South Australia
- Christine Bryan, 22, Queensland
- Laura Davey, 19, Victoria
- Alana Gray, 20, South Australia
- Carryn Jack, 19, Australian Capital Territory
- Laura Kiddle, 22, Victoria
- Ally Mansell, 20, New South Wales (Winner)
- Veronica McCann, 21, Western Australia
- Kirusha Moodley, 28, Western Australia
- Zena Moussa, 21, New South Wales
- Belinda Royal, 24, Victoria
- Wendy Slack-Smith, 27, New South Wales (Runner Up)
- Melissa Starzynski, 23, Victoria
- Abby Valdes, 28, Victoria (Second Runner Up)

Both winner and runner up Australian Princesses, Ally Mansell and Wendy Slack-Smith, later appeared as contestants on the game show Friday Night Games.

=== Guest appearances ===
- Princess Tamara
- Jenny West
- Christian Lindqvist
- Nick Moore
- James Ashton
- David Grant
- Diana Fischer
- James Whitaker
- Richard Aronowitz
- Francis Wright
- Sonia, Lady McMahon

== Series two ==
The second season was broadcast during the summer of 2006/07.

=== Contestants ===
- Carly Andrews, 19, Australian Capital Territory
- Kylie Booby, 22, New South Wales (Winner)
- Leanne Churchill, 30, Victoria
- Lianzi Fields, 19, Australian Capital Territory
- Jaya Henderson, 23, Western Australia
- Stephanie Jenkinson, 22, South Australia (Second Runner Up)
- Amanda Lavis, 26, New South Wales
- Amy Manning, 24, New South Wales (Runner Up)
- Bianca Micallef, 22, Victoria
- Carolyn Pearson, 22, Victoria
- Kate Perkins, 25, Victoria
- Elise Udy, 20, New South Wales

After the series Kylie Booby and Stephanie Jenkinson were also seen at the New Year's Eve 2006 celebration in Sydney. Jenkinson is now a radio announcer on Nova 91.9 from 7pm-10 pm week nights.
