= Caption contest =

English language term

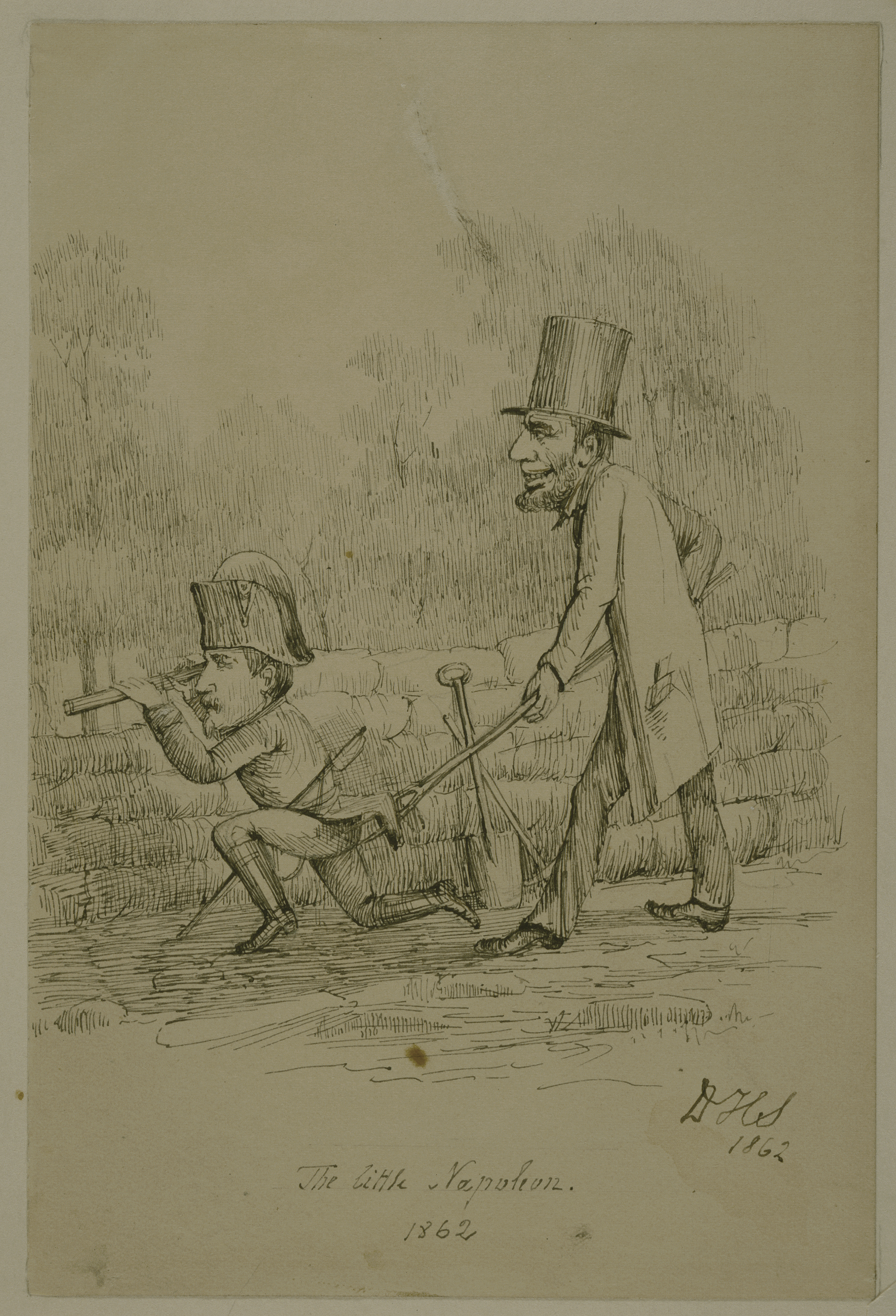
The text you are reading now is the caption for this image.

A caption contest or caption competition is a writing competition where participants are required to write an image's accompanying text.

== General information ==
Writing contests can be used for advertisement of a publication, entertainment, or to practice one's skills.

They can be organized by any group of people but usually from a place where receiving a large number of submissions is a non-issue, such as an internet forum or a major publication like The New Yorker. Contest organizers have offered applicants the reward of publishing their name and submitted caption with the image or even monetary prizes.

Contests vary by image type (photo or drawing), caption format (description of a situation or a dialogue), and judging criteria. Captions can use different forms of literary expression (poetry, prose, word play, etc.) and are judged based on how well it suits the image, if it follows the contest's rules, and the preferred tone of the judges. For example, if a participant submitted a well-liked caption but they were to young to join the entry may be disqualified.

== History ==
It is considered that the origins of caption contests are related to the increase of popularity of cartoons and comics as well as widespread use of illustrations and the rise of photojournalism in printed media at the end of the 19th century. All these areas share the combination of words and images that could be multiplied and made available to a wide audience with the beginnings of mass printing and wide spread of newspapers and magazines.

From currently available information, the first caption contests in printed media appeared in the U.S. press of the late 19th century (such as Life magazine which was published from year 1883 to 1936). At that time these competitions were called picture title or picture headline contests, but their concept and meaning was identical to current caption contests. It must be considered, that the term caption in its present sense firstly appeared in English language only in the first half of the 20th century.

In the beginning of the 20th century, at least in the U.S. press (for example, The San Francisco Call, The Daily News, The Bridgeport Telegram) caption contests were already quite popular. In these competitions drawn pictures and cartoons were mainly used. Photo caption contests appeared little later with the improvement of printing quality (towards the second quarter of 20th century).

During the course of the 20th century, caption contests were published in printed media in many countries of the world. For example, in Soviet Union one of the first caption contests was published in daily newspaper Izvestia Sunday supplement Nedelya (The Week) at the beginning of the 1960s. Little later a newspaper Literaturnaya gazeta began to publish caption contests that became very popular and they are part of this newspaper up until now.

The spread of caption contests increased even more with the emergence of the Internet by the end of the 20th century, and at the beginning of the 21st century. Internet has made the organization of caption contests and participation in them possible for wide audiences across the world.

== Present situation ==
Although a considerable amount of caption contests are now on Internet, caption contests in printed media still exist and are quite popular. A very popular and prominent is a weekly caption contest published in American magazine The New Yorker. The contest first appeared in 1998 and has been published regularly in each issue since 2005. Each week several thousand participants take part in this competition. On the Internet, a very popular is the weekly caption competition on BBC website (Magazine Monitor section), held since 2006.

Along the traditional caption contests, there have appeared different forms of this genre such as anti-caption contests for worst submitted caption and reverse caption contests where the most suitable picture must be submitted for a given caption. There are also caption contests devoted to particular themes such as history or football.

In 2006, the website caption.me (then captioncompetition.co.uk) was founded, featuring user-submitted photos and captions.

The New Yorker magazine, noting the popularity of its cartoon caption contest, has created a caption contest board game and issued a book with the most interesting cartoons and winning captions as well as comprehensive information covering this theme.

Also concerning the New Yorker caption contest, several scientific studies have been carried out: researchers from University of New Mexico, Department of Anthropology, in 2010 have compared humour ability in males and females in context of this competition; members of The New Yorker editorial board and University of Colorado Boulder Leeds School of Business in 2011 analysed several thousand entries of this contest to study the concept of humour.

== In popular culture ==
In U.S. TV series The Office, seventh-season episode "The Search", its character Pam starts a caption contest in the office, with her co-worker Gabe instituting rules that no one wants to follow.

In British sitcom Green Wing, the second series, episode six, its character Alan Statham wins a caption competition on the Consultant Radiologists International website, an organisation of which Alan claims to be an "Esteemed member".

In a children's novel Absolute Zero by Helen Cresswell its character Uncle Parker has won a trip to the Caribbean in a caption contest. The rest of the family immediately enter similar competitions in an attempt to better his prize but, much of the time, beating the others to an entry form is a victory in itself.

In season two of the HBO series Bored to Death, George (played by Ted Danson) struggles to caption a New Yorker cartoon, which portrays a police duck interacting with a suicidal bear.
