= Ordinary Jack =

1977 novel by Helen Cresswell

- First edition
- Author: Helen Cresswell
- Cover artist: Jill Bennett
- Language: English
- Series: The Bagthorpe Saga
- Genre: Children's novel
- Publisher: Faber and Faber
- Publication date: 1977
- Publication place: United Kingdom
- Media type: Print (Hardback & Paperback)
- Pages: 192 pp
- ISBN: 0571111149
- OCLC: 16908347
- Followed by: Absolute Zero

Ordinary Jack is a novel by Helen Cresswell, the first book in the Bagthorpe Saga.

== Plot summary ==
Jack Bagthorpe is beaten at everything by his family. Depressed at being an 'ordinary' child in a talented family, and by the failure to beat his younger sister at swimming, Jack Bagthorpe enlists the help of his Uncle Parker in hatching a scheme to become equal. Later, a series of events involving Zero (the family dog) and cousin Daisy result in the dining room being destroyed by a spectacular fire involving a box of fireworks. Jack has a clandestine meeting with Uncle Parker during which they conspire to turn Jack into a prophet or seer. His first prediction will concern Uncle Parker appearing in a lavender coloured suit. The meeting ends abruptly as Daisy, excited about the previous evening's events, dabbles with pyromania. Jack returns home to act "mysteriously", as a build up to making his first prophecy. His first attempt is disrupted when Mr Bagthorpe is goaded into attempting a headstand, breaking his writing arm in the process. Jack uses his father's immobility to corner him and make the prediction ("I see a Lavender Man bearing tidings") and shortly thereafter Uncle Parker appears in his suit to complete the prophecy. Flush with success, Jack and Uncle Parker visit a store where they purchase a crystal ball and a set of tarot cards, and plot their next prediction which will involve a red and white bubble.

Life in the Bagthorpe family continues to be disrupted. Because of his broken arm, scriptwriter Mr Bagthorpe is unable to work; The arrival of a Danish au-pair causes turmoil amongst the younger family members as they squabble over her attentions; Jack makes prophesies and teaches Zero to fetch sticks; Daisy continues to set fires. As Rosie's birthday nears Mr Bagthorpe suffers further problems; twice he hides in the garden with a cassette recorder to record dialogue, and twice Zero mistakes the microphone for a stick and chews it up. Jack makes a prophecy concerning the giant bubble and bears, and worries the family by naming the date of Rosie's birthday party. Grandma chooses to interpret the bear as a symbol for her cat Thomas, previously killed under the wheels of Uncle Parker's car, and predicts his return. On the day itself, Mr Bagthorpe's literary frustrations reach a peak and he excuses himself from the al-fresco party to do some "serious reading". During his absence the prophecy is fulfilled by a giant balloon carrying two men dressed as bears; however, Mr Bagthorpe returns brandishing Jack's diary containing evidence of the conspiracy, to destroy any mystical illusion. An argument is forestalled as smoke caused by Daisy's latest fire rises from the house

Finally the plot is exposed. On reflection the family praise Jack for his inventiveness and fine acting. Rosie is pleased that her party succeeds her grandmother's as the most disastrous ever. Mr Bagthorpe's mood lightens as he is revealed to have found Jack's diary only because his "serious reading" involved working his way through Jack's pile of comic books, where the diary was hidden.
