= Jerry Foulkes =

Jerry Foulkes is a former presenter of Children's ITV in the United Kingdom. He is also an ex-radio disc jockey and has successfully worked in the UK television industry for many years.

== Children's ITV ==
On 3 April 1989, the contract to produce Children's ITV was taken over by an independent production company, called Stonewall Productions. Foulkes was hired to present the Children's ITV weekday afternoons service, which he did from Monday 3 April to Friday 22 December 1989. Children's ITV's afternoon service ran from 4:00 to 5:10 pm (Monday–Friday), except on bank holidays. He co-presented Children's ITV with a puppet character called Scally The Dog, and they had a catchphrase which was "We're still here!", which they both often said during their links, referring to them still being on-air at the time.

=== Competitions ===
There were several big competitions during Foulkes' time on CITV. One was in conjunction with the programme Streetwise (which was a show all about cycle couriers and starred the then-unknown Andy Serkis). Viewers had to design and draw a customised bike of their own, featuring reflective lights and other things, so it could be ridden safely in the dark. The main prizes for the winners were two Muddy Fox mountain bikes, with some special CITV reflective safety jackets and cycle lights as runner-up prizes. The competition had over 32,000 entries in total. Another competition was a tie-in with the adventure game-show Knightmare. Eagle-eyed viewers had to look out for random letters appearing on-screen during Episode 7 of Series 3, which would eventually spell out a word connected with fantasy. The actual word was 'Excalibur' and the prizes for the winner were a ZX Spectrum computer system and a copy of the first Knightmare computer game. Hordriss, a character from the show, appeared on CITV to set the competition and Foulkes announced the winner on 8 December 1989, just before Episode 14 of Series 3 of the show.

=== Special guests ===
Many special guests appeared in the studio during Foulkes' time on CITV. Various pop stars such as Kylie Minogue, Jason Donovan, Sonia, Big Fun, Lisa Stansfield, The Primitives and many more all appeared in 1989. Donovan's appearance on CITV was quite memorable, as due to him being stuck in traffic, he arrived at the CITV studios in Birmingham just before the start of the final programme of the day, which was a repeat of Scooby-Doo. However, the show was started a bit earlier than originally planned and the final CITV link of the day was quite longer than usual, which gave Foulkes and Scally a bit more of air-time to chat to Donovan. Other stars who appeared in 1989 were the late TV presenter and practical joker Jeremy Beadle and the Australian cartoonist Rolf Harris, who drew portraits of both Jerry and Scally throughout the links on the day he appeared.

=== Departure ===
Foulkes left CITV on 22 December 1989, and on 2 January 1990, fellow CITV presenter Jeanne Downs (who had presented CITV's summer mornings service in 1989) took over co-presenting the afternoons with Scally, until 5 April 1991, when Stonewall lost the contract to produce CITV back to Central Television (who had also done it previously from 1983 to 1989). On the first day that Downs took over from Foulkes (on 2 January 1990), they had a mop and a bucket in the studio, with a name tag of Foulkes on it, and during the links both she and Scally made some amusing comments about it.

Also, due to frequent CITV opt-outs by TSW, in order to fit in their local birthdays programme, Gus Honeybun, ITV viewers in the South West missed out on many of Foulkes' links during 1989, most notably his final day on 22 December 1989, as they opted out of several links, including the final one, which meant that TSW viewers never got to hear him say "Goodbye" for the last time.

Foulkes was one of several former CITV presenters who didn't appear on CITV's 20th Birthday Bash on 3 January 2003, although he was briefly mentioned and several clips of him were shown during the show.

== Other TV and radio work ==
After he graduated from Leicester University in 1983, Foulkes started his media career in radio, working on both BBC Radio Leicester and BBC Radio Norfolk in the 1980s. During his time at BBC Radio Norfolk, amongst other things, he presented an evening show called Nightdrive. After four years there, he left in 1987 to become a video jockey on the newly launched music channel MTV Europe. He left MTV in 1989 to join Children's ITV. After he left Children's ITV, he then moved into the world of television production, starting a very long and successful career as a producer and editor.

He joined the BBC and worked on many different TV and radio projects, which included programmes for Children's BBC, BBC World Service and BBC Radio 1. Whilst at Radio 1, he was the producer of the Dave Lee Travis show. In 1993, he became the producer of the BBC1 daytime show, Good Morning with Anne and Nick for three years. Also, in 1992–3, he returned to presenting on BBC Radio 5, when he co-presented the pop music magazine show On The Level, with the actress and singer Tracy Elster. Also in 1992, he very briefly appeared in an episode of the BBC TV series That's Life!, in a short featurette about their talent contest winner, Allison Jordan. This also featured a young and then-unknown Simon Cowell and Andi Peters (the then current Children's BBC presenter) in it too.

Later in 1996, Foulkes moved to Channel 4 and was the editor of their long-running TV review show Right To Reply for three years. In 1997, he was also the editor of another Channel 4 TV review show, the short-lived Nightwatch, which was presented by Pat Kane. In 1999, he then returned to the BBC and became a commissioning executive in factual programming for four years. In 2003, he joined talkbackTHAMES and was the editor of their factual programmes, one of which was the popular Channel 4 show, How Clean Is Your House?, which began in 2003. He left there after 2 years in 2005.

== Recent work ==
Foulkes continues to work in television as a producer/editor, some of his more recent work including Fear Of Flying (Channel 4, 2006), Britain's Dream Homes (BBC TV, 2008), Jimmy's Food Factory (BBC TV, 2009) (which starred the farmer, Jimmy Doherty) and Cowboy Trap (BBC TV, 2010). In January 2010, he became the head of Mentorn Scotland, which is part of the Tinopolis group, but left them a year later in January 2011. In September 2012, he co-founded (with Andrea Miller) a new company called Sunnyside Productions.
