= Martine Blanc =

French author and illustrator of books for children

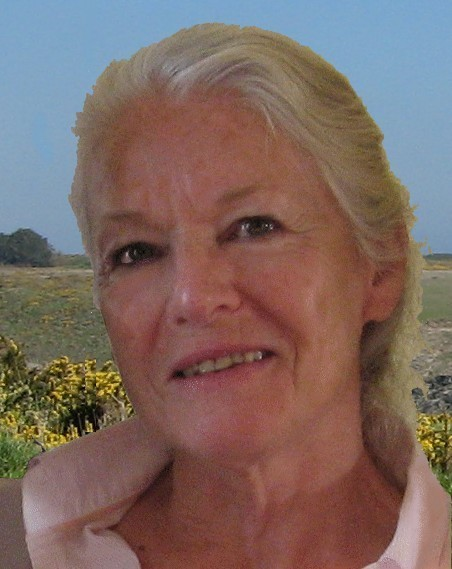
Martine Blanc-Rérat

Martine Blanc (born 16 September 1944 in Clermont-Ferrand, Puy-de-Dôme) is a French author and illustrator of ten books for children including The story of Timothy, the Two Hoots series in collaboration with Helen Cresswell, and All about Jesus.

== Education ==
Blanc holds a degree in architecture from the École Nationale Supérieure des Beaux-Arts of Paris, France.

== Career ==
In 1970s, Blanc started her writing career as a children's book author. Blanc's illustrations are also displayed in her children books and the Two Hoots series written by Helen Cresswell, a TV scriptwriter and children author. In addition, Blanc is also credited in the animation department of an animation 1993 film David Copperfield.

== Filmography ==
- 1987 The Big Bang – as production administrator.
- 1993 David Copperfield – as layout and posing administrator.

== Works ==
=== Timothy ===
- The story of Timothy, Ernest Benn Limited, London, 1972
- Hyacinthe, Ernest Benn Limited, London, 1976

The character Timothy has led to an important merchandising in Japan (dolls, watches, tee-shirts...).

=== The Two Hoots series (text from Helen Cresswell) ===
- Two Hoots, Ernest Benn Limited, London, 1974 ISBN 0-510-11842-9
- Two Hoots go to the sea, Ernest Benn Limited, London, 1974 ISBN 0-510-11843-7
- Two Hoots and the Big Bad Bird, Ernest Benn Limited, London, 1975 ISBN 0-510-11844-5
- Two Hoots in the Snow, Ernest Benn Limited, London, 1975 ISBN 0-510-11845-3
- Two Hoots Play Hide-And Seek, Ernest Benn Limited, London, 1977 ISBN 0-510-11803-8
- Two Hoots and the King, Ernest Benn Limited, London, 1977 ISBN 0-510-11800-3

=== Pelé, Velu et Dodue ===
- Pelé, Velu et Dodue , Fernand Nathan, Paris, 1980 ISBN 2-09-271524-0

=== All about Jesus ===
- All about Jesus: The Life and Teachings of Jesus in the Bible's Own Words, Loyola Press, 2000 ISBN 0-8294-1506-8
