= Clive Warren =

British former radio presenter (born 1968)

- Born: 1968 (age 57–58); London, England
- Years active: 1980s–2019
- Presenting career
- Stations: Metro Radio (1986–1988, 2009–2013); Capital London (1990–1994); BBC Radio 1 (1994–2000); Virgin Radio (2000–2002); Real Radio Wales (2003); Jazz FM (2004); Heart 106.2 (2005–2006); Reading 107 (2006); Century Radio (c.2006–2008); Heart Sussex (2009, drivetime cover); Hallam FM (2013–2014); Viking FM (2013–2014); Radio Aire (2013–2014); Magic; Smooth North East (2014–2019)

Clive Warren (born 1968) is a British former radio presenter.

== Early career ==
Warren's first experience of radio broadcasting came at Radio Moorfields, the hospital station at Moorfields Eye Hospital in London, which broadcast from 1974 until 2006. From there he joined the first in-store radio station, Radio Topshop, at Topshop's store on Oxford Circus in London. By 1986, Warren was presenting shows on Metro Radio, covering the north-east of England, and he remained with the station until September 1988, when he accepted a 2-year posting with BFBS in Cyprus, but returned home after six months, citing homesickness. On returning to England, he joined TFM. After a further four months in the north-east, he was hired as a presenter of Children's ITV's summer mornings & afternoons service in July 1989 alongside Jeanne Downs, and returned for the following year, hosting alongside fellow presenters Nick Owen and Scally the Dog. After leaving ITV in 1990 he joined Capital FM, initially presenting an overnight slot as well as covering other shows. He later presented the early weekend morning show and also the weekday overnight slots.

== Radio 1 ==
Warren was recruited to BBC Radio 1 in November 1994 alongside then KISS 100 presenter Danny Rampling, and he presented the Weekend Breakfast Show from 19 November. In September 1995, Warren became Chris Evans' warmup presenter as he took over the Weekday Early Breakfast show. He left the early breakfast slot in July 1997 to make way for the arrival of Chris Moyles, and he consequently presented the weekday overnight show from 1 am to 4 am (later 2–4) from the beginning of August on Tuesday to Friday, alongside the Sunday Breakfast show. He took over Saturday Early Breakfast in February 1999. While at Radio 1 he gave the first UK radio play to "Free as a Bird", the first single released by The Beatles for 25 years, and was a regular stand-in for presenters such as Kevin Greening, Simon Mayo and Dave Pearce. Warren was one of the presenters of the Radio 1 Roadshow in 1995 and 1996, and between July 1995 and November 1998 he was a regular stand-in for Mark Goodier on the Sunday UK Top 40 chart. He left Radio 1 in 2000, with his final Saturday Early Breakfast show broadcast on 30 September, the station's 33rd birthday.

== Virgin Radio ==
In October 2000, Clive joined Virgin Radio, presenting a Sunday afternoon show from 1 pm to 4 pm and in January 2001, he took over the Weekday late-night slot from Gary Davies, from 10 pm to 1 am. He left Virgin in January 2002 and returned briefly to Capital FM presenting occasional overnight slots.

== Real Radio and Jazz FM ==
In early 2003, Clive joined Real Radio Wales, where he presented the afternoon show and in March 2004, he joined London's 102.2 Jazz FM, presenting a Saturday morning show from 10 am to 2 pm and the Weekday late night show from 9 pm to midnight. He remained there until October 2004.

== Heart 106.2 and Reading 107 ==
In early 2005, Clive joined London's Heart 106.2 as a stand in presenter, before taking over the Sunday mid-morning show from 9 am to noon.

In addition to that, in early 2006, he also joined Reading 107, as a presenter of their weekday drivetime show from 2 pm to 6 pm. He remained here until late 2006.

== Century and Heart ==
Clive then worked at 105.4 Century Radio in Manchester as the afternoon host. He broadcast the show every weekday from 1 pm to 4 pm and also presented a Sunday show from 1 to 4pm. Clive left Century Radio (now Heart North West) in December 2008. Clive also covered Heart Sussex Drivetime in 2009.

== Bauer Radio ==
On 14 December 2009 he replaced Mark Thorburn on the Bauer Radio owned Metro Radio in Newcastle upon Tyne, presenting weekday mid-mornings until 5 June 2012, then he continued to present Sunday mid-mornings until 7 April 2013. He also relief presented on the Magic network.

From mid April 2013 he spent the following eleven months presenting across Bauer Radio's Yorkshire stations, based at Radio Aire in Leeds, and networked with Hallam FM and Viking FM. He presented the Late 'n' Live show Sunday–Thursday from 10 pm to 1 am, as well as providing cover from other presenters on these stations.

== Smooth Radio ==
From 24 March 2014, he presented The Smooth Drive Home for Smooth North East based in Newcastle. He could originally be heard weekdays from 4 pm to 8 pm and Saturdays from 2 pm to 6 pm. However, from 2015, his weekday drivetime show had gone out to 4 pm to 7 pm. He left the Communicorp-owned station on 30 August 2019.

== Miscellaneous ==
On the series 2 premiere of The Ricky Gervais Show podcast, Karl Pilkington confuses Clive Warren for Clive Owen when proposing a film script.
