= Marilyn Fox =

British television producer and writer

Marilyn Fox is a British television producer, director and writer, who was strongly associated with BBC children's programmes from the 1960s to the 1990s, working on many drama series and enjoying a long association with Jackanory.

Her credits include:

- Jackanory (119 episodes, 1967–1991)
- The Island of the Great Yellow Ox (1971, as adapter)
- Treasure Over the Water (1972)
- Carrie's War (1974, as adapter)
- King Thrushbeard and the Proud Princess (1974)
- The Day I Shot My Dad (1976)
- Graham's Gang (1977)
- Spine Chillers (1980)
- Our John Willie (1980)
- The Bells of Astercote (1980)
- Codename Icarus (1981)
- The Toy Princess (1981)
- With My Little Eye (1982)
- The Baker Street Boys (1983)
- Seaview (1983)
- Running Scared (1986)
- The Cuckoo Sister (1986)
- The Chronicles of Narnia: The Lion, the Witch and the Wardrobe (1988)
- Not the End of the World (1989)
- Five Children and It (1991: a.k.a. The Sand Fairy on its American video release)
- Archer's Goon (1992)
- The Return of the Psammead (1993: a.k.a. The Return of It on its American DVD release, and The Return of the Sand Fairy on its American video release)
- Earthfasts (1994)
- Agent Z and the Penguin from Mars (1996)
