= The Phoenix and the Carpet (1997 serial) =

British television programme

- Genre: Drama
- Created by: E. Nesbit
- Written by: Helen Cresswell
- Directed by: Michael Kerrigan
- Starring: David Suchet
- Music by: Paul Hart
- Country of origin: United Kingdom
- Original language: English
- No. of series: 1
- No. of episodes: 6

Production
- Producer: Giles Ridge
- Running time: 28 minutes
- Production companies: HIT Entertainment; BBC

Original release
- Network: BBC One
- Release: 16 November – 21 December 1997

The Phoenix and the Carpet is a 1997 British six-part drama based on the book of the same name by E. Nesbit co-produced by HIT Entertainment and the BBC which aired throughout November-December 1997. Starring David Suchet as the Phoenix, the serial focuses on four children in Edwardian England who acquire a phoenix and the adventures they have as a result.

An earlier 8-part serialisation of the same story was made by the BBC in 1976 starring Jane Forster, Max Harris, Tamzin Neville and Gary Russell as the four children.

== Outline ==
In the first episode, a second-hand carpet is delivered to the Bastable household in London. Impatient for the arrival of Guy Fawkes Night, the four Bastable children had set off fireworks in the nursery, leading to a fire. Rolled up in the carpet, the children find a large egg. When they accidentally knock it into the fire, it hatches, and a talking Phoenix emerges. The new carpet is a magic carpet and can take the children anywhere, and with it they have some exotic adventures.

The Phoenix is a friend of the Psammead, whom the children already know, and his help is sometimes called upon.

In the sixth episode, the Phoenix decides it is time for him to begin his cycle again, going up in flames to arise from the ashes in two thousand years' time. He lays an egg, and immolates himself.

== Cast ==
- David Suchet as the Phoenix
- Francis Wright as the Psammead
- Jessica Fox as Anthea Bastable
- Ben Simpson as Cyril Bastable
- Charlotte Chinn as Jane Bastable
- Ivan Berry as Robert Bastable
- Miriam Margolyes as Cook
- Lesley Dunlop as Eliza
- Christopher Biggins as Tonks
- Shaun Dingwall as Burglar
- Gemma Jones as Mrs Bibble
- Jean Alexander as Lily
- Kim Vithana as Oriental Princess
- Zina Badran as a Lady
- Miranda Pleasence as Miss Peasmarsh
- Nicola Redmond as Amelia
- Ian Keith as Father
- Mary Waterhouse as Mother

== Production ==
The series was a co-production between the BBC and HIT Entertainment and took the format of six 28-minute episodes, first broadcast on BBC One between November and December 1997.

The Phoenix and the Carpet is part of a family of BBC productions about the adventures of the Bastable children, based on novels by E. Nesbit, launched in 1991 with Five Children and It in six episodes, followed in 1993 by The Return of the Psammead. All three were adapted by Helen Cresswell, and apart from the children the Psammead, created and voiced by Francis Wright, appears in all three.

== Home media ==
A VHS and DVD release from Reader's Digest (under license from BBC Worldwide) was released in 2004, containing the 90-minute feature-length edit of the serial.

== See also ==
- Five Children and It TV Series
- The Return of the Psammead
