= Absolute Zero (novel) =

1978 children's novel by Helen Cresswell

- First edition
- Author: Helen Cresswell
- Language: English
- Series: The Bagthorpe Saga
- Genre: Children's literature, humour
- Publisher: Faber and Faber
- Publication date: 1978
- Publication place: United Kingdom
- Media type: Print (hardback and paperback)
- ISBN: 978-0-571-11155-8
- OCLC: 4465174
- LC Class: PZ7.C8645 Ab
- Preceded by: Ordinary Jack
- Followed by: Bagthorpes Unlimited

Absolute Zero is a 1978 children's novel by Helen Cresswell, the second book in the Bagthorpe Saga.

== Plot introduction ==
The Bagthorpe Saga follows the lives of the Bagthorpe family, who live in Unicorn House in an unspecified part of the United Kingdom. The nearest large settlement is the (presumably) fictional town of Aysham. Jack Bagthorpe is the protagonist with his dog Zero. Jack's family become involved in entering competitions.

== Plot summary ==
Uncle Parker has won a trip to the Caribbean in a caption contest. In typical Bagthorpian style, the rest of the family immediately enter similar competitions in an attempt to better his prize but, much of the time, beating the others to an entry form is a victory in itself. With the Parkers on vacation, manic 4-year-old cousin Daisy comes to stay. Uncle Parker claimed her pyromania has passed, but neglected to mention the nature of her current obsession. As Daisy's activities bring the household to its knees using items such as paint, face powder, water and an invisible friend/entity named Arry Awk, Grandma manages to get herself arrested, Mrs Fosdyke is reduced to serving up dishes such as oxtail trifle, while the children are busy wrapping up unwanted prizes to give each other as Christmas presents. When the Bagthorpes eventually win a chance at fame and happiness, the fates deliver a chance for history to not only repeat but excel itself.

== Release details ==
- 1978, UK, Faber and Faber (ISBN 978-0-571-11155-8), 20 February 1978, hardback (first edition)
- 1979, UK, Puffin Books (ISBN 978-0-14-031177-8), 27 September 1979, paperback
- 2005, UK, Oxford University Press (ISBN 978-0-19-275400-4), 3 March 2005, paperback
