= Richard Coombs =

British puppeteer

Richard Coombs is a British puppeteer who has worked extensively on television shows, feature films, commercials, and music videos. From 1987 to 1988, he worked on the ITV Saturday morning children's show, Get Fresh, where he operated the puppet Gilbert the Alien, alongside fellow puppeteer John Eccleston, with the character's voice performed by Phil Cornwell.

Coombs was one of the three puppeteers (again alongside Eccleston as well as Michael J. Bassett), who each alternately controlled and voiced the puppet character, Scally the Dog, who co-presented Children's ITV, from 1989–1991.

From 1990-1992 he performed the character of Ringo the Rabbit on A Kind of Magic, an ITV programme starring British magician Wayne Dobson.

In January 2003, he returned as Scally on the CITV's 20th Birthday Bash programme, alongside fellow presenter, Jeanne Downs. He is a Punch and Judy performer and has worked on several Jim Henson Muppet projects. He was one of the puppeteers on the ITV satirical show, Spitting Image, and worked on the 2005 film version of The Hitchhiker's Guide to the Galaxy.

== Filmography ==
- Labyrinth: goblins (uncredited)
- The Tale of the Bunny Picnic (uncredited)
- The Ghost of Faffner Hall: The Zookeeper, Madame Mumu, Mr. Director, Piganini, other guest characters
- The Storyteller: devils in "The Soldier and Death"
- The NeverEnding Story III
- Flat Eric
- The Honey Monster (facial controls)
- Alice in Wonderland: White Rabbit (face/voice)
- Snow Queen: polar bear (puppeteer)
- "Playtime (puppeteer)
- "The Roly Mo Show (Puppeteer and Voice of Rocket)
- Play With Me Sesame UK: Domby
- The Hitchhiker's Guide to the Galaxy: Kwaltz (face)
- ABBA's The Last Video
- Spitting Image
- Little Shop of Horrors
- Babe: Pig in the City
- Mongrels (puppeteer)
- Sooty (2001 TV series) (puppeteer)
