= Scally the Dog =

British children's television character

A Children's ITV promotional photo from early 1989, of Scally the Dog and his first co-presenter Mark Granger.

Scally the Dog was a puppet mongrel dog character, who co-presented the Children's ITV afternoon service from January 1989 – March 1991 in the United Kingdom.

== Children's ITV ==
Children's ITV's bosses had noticed how successful puppet characters (such as Gordon the Gopher and Edd the Duck) had been on its rival, Children's BBC, so they decided to create their own version, which was Scally the Dog. He was operated and voiced alternately by three different puppeteers, who were Richard Coombs, John Eccleston and Michael J. Bassett. Coombs was the original operator of Scally and also built the puppet of him too. However, due to him working on other TV projects at the time, he had to share the duties of doing Scally with both Eccleston and Bassett too. During his time at Children's ITV, there was also a short-lived Scally cartoon strip in the children's TV magazine Look-in as well.

A Scally cartoon-strip from Look-in magazine, August 1989.

Scally first appeared on Children's ITV in January 1989, alongside his first human co-presenter, Mark Granger. When the independent production company, Stonewall Productions took over producing Children's ITV in April '89, Scally was kept on and appeared alongside the new presenter, Jerry Foulkes, in the afternoons for the rest of '89. In Summer 1989, when Stonewall's Children's ITV summer mornings service launched, he appeared with new recruits, Clive Warren and Jeanne Downs. Scally had several catchphrases that he often used on Children's ITV, one of which was: "Yes, indeedy!", which he usually said when he was happy about something. Another one was: "We're still here!", which was often said by both Foulkes and Scally during their links, referring to them still being on-air at the time.

A Children's ITV promotional photo of the Stonewall Productions presenting team from summer 1989. (Back to front: Jerry Foulkes, Scally the Dog, Jeanne Downs and Clive Warren.)

Foulkes left Children's ITV on 22 December 1989, so Downs took over presenting in the afternoons on 2 January 1990, along with Scally. This continued until 29 March 1991, when Stonewall lost the contract to produce Children's ITV back to Central Television (who had also done it previously from 1983–1989). They were both replaced by a solo Tommy Boyd on 1 April 1991. However, both Downs and Scally (operated and voiced by Coombs) made a return to CITV 12 years later on 3 January 2003, when they appeared on a special one-off programme called CITV's 20th Birthday Bash, shown as part of the ITV programming block's landmark 20th birthday celebrations.

== After Children's ITV ==
According to a post by Downs on the TV Forum website in 1998, the puppet of Scally now resides at the Museum of the Moving Image in Birmingham, and is owned by someone who used to work on the BBC Saturday morning kids' show Live & Kicking.
