= The Bagthorpe Saga =

Series of novels by Helen Cresswell

The Bagthorpe Saga is a series of 10 novels by Helen Cresswell published between 1977 and 2001 winning two International Reading Association awards published in the UK and the United States by Faber and Faber. The first two novels formed the basis of a BBC TV comedy series in 1981.

== Background ==
The saga follows the farcical, satirical and blackly comic lives of the eccentric, ultra-competitive, friendless, relentlessly self-absorbed and largely disloyal Bagthorpe family, who live at Unicorn House in the fictional village of Passingham, near the small market town of Aysham.

== Books in the Saga ==
1. Ordinary Jack (1977) ISBN 0-380-43349-4
2. Absolute Zero (1978) ISBN 0-571-11155-6
3. Bagthorpes Unlimited (1978) ISBN 0-380-49296-2
4. Bagthorpes Versus the World (1979) ISBN 0-340-72246-0
5. Bagthorpes Abroad (1984) ISBN 0-14-031972-7
6. Bagthorpes Haunted (1985) ISBN 0-340-71655-X
7. Bagthorpes Liberated (1989) ISBN 0-02-725441-0
8. The Bagthorpe Triangle (1992) ISBN 0-571-17805-7
9. Bagthorpes Besieged (1996) ISBN 0-571-17423-X
10. Bagthorpes Battered (2001) ISBN 0-340-78824-0

== Main characters ==
=== Parents ===
- Henry Bagthorpe, father of the family. A highly self-regarding and mildly successful scriptwriter for the BBC although notably these feature no love scenes and he never shows affection for any of his family. Has written for Michael Hordern and Hannah Gordon. He is prone to furious hyperbolic rant reserving a particular distaste for Uncle Parker and even more the infant graffiti artist Daisy, stating "she will herself be in immediate need of an elegy" should she write poems on his walls. At another point he wishes her incinerated through electrocution. Often seeks monetary reparations from Uncle Parker for damage Daisy has caused, typically exaggerating the total. The inclination to suggesting death for those that offend him is repeated with Aunt Lucy who doesn't believe in time "the only logical thing for her...is to clear off to where there isn't any - namely eternity." Neither is he fond of Zero often referring to him as numbskulled, mutton-headed and pudding-footed. Often questions his mental health and fears an imminent nervous collapse and even contemplates self-slaughter during the holiday in Wales. He cuts a ragged figure "...like that of an ill-made bed..." and is known for extreme discourtesy. Laura considers him "...yellow and idle" whilst he shows complete disregard by not knowing her age, birthday, height or hair colour, but settles upon her being "obese" and "mud-eyed" when questioned by the police. A former drink-driver, he has no friends.
- Laura Bagthorpe, mother of the family. An agony aunt (under the name "Stella Bright"), and part-time magistrate, ironically any advice she gives to her own clan is rarely taken. Known as a serial apologist and soft touch by the criminal fraternity who encounter her on the Bench. Has a marked propensity to use the phrase "Oh dear!" in response to the myriad catastrophes she endures and in one novel this amounts to twelve examples. She further copes via "...Breathing, Yoga and Positive Thinking." By the seventh novel these are augmented by "Balance" but she loses her mind and suffers a mental breakdown regardless.

=== Children ===
Three of the four children are held, chiefly by themselves, to be genii, and work assiduously at the many 'Strings to their Bows'. The view of their intelligence and conduct is not shared by their headmaster who leaves blank his comment boxes on their reports since "If he said anything complimentary he would be perjuring himself" so the Bagthorpe children steam open the envelopes to forge flattery.

- William Bagthorpe, sixteen, whose talents include drumming, amateur radio, mathematics, tennis and electronics. An avid reader of sci-fi he spends much of his spare time communicating with an unseen alleged communicator with aliens, the fellow radio-ham "Anonymous from Grimsby".
- Tess Bagthorpe, fourteen, fluent in French (in one book, Tess undertakes to rewrite Voltaire to get into the Guinness Book of Records) she plays the oboe and piano and has a black belt in judo. Highly literate and verbose, she quotes from mythology and literature and is a capable forger. Claims a burgeoning String in hypnotism.
- Jack Bagthorpe, twelve and has no 'Strings' whatsoever. He is thoroughly attached to Zero who regularly receives abusive and mocking commentaries from the other Bagthorpes. Mr Bagthorpe disputes Jack's legitimacy but Grandma is fond of him "in her own way." He is the family member whose thoughts are most often expressed by the narrator. Gentle, caring and sincere, Uncle Parker considers him a "pearl among swine" as illustrated by being the sole Bagthorpe perturbed by his mother's disappearance at the end of the seventh novel. He actually does have a talent which he eventually realizes a talent for writing stories. He also is more grounded than his family which is overlooked.
- Rosie Bagthorpe, ten, whose 'Strings' include mathematics (putting her in competition with William), violin, cello, painting, photography and record keeping.

=== Other family members ===
- Grace Bagthorpe/Grandma, mother of Henry, Celia and Claud. Married to Alfred, they live with the other Bagthorpes at Unicorn House on a 'temporary' basis...which has extended to ten years. Is thrilled by engaging in rows and the aiding and abetting of chaos. Henry is her favourite child since he is always easy to goad into stupendous slanging matches. Despite this one of her fondest wishes is to see him arrested and imprisoned, and when this comes to pass she makes various excuses to avoid posting bail. An accomplished stirrer and cheat, her joy is obtained mainly via schadenfreude. Holds a vendetta against Uncle Parker for running over her spiteful cat Thomas years ago but acquires a replacement. Dotes upon Daisy, calling her a "shining jewel of a child" and probably recognizing her as a kindred spirit, forming what the Bagthorpes term the "Unholy Alliance". Grandma loves the frequent visits of the police and trains herself to memorise car registration numbers in the hope she will one day be a key witness to a criminal event featuring a vehicular element. She takes to writing memoirs that mainly consist of vilifying Henry.
- Alfred Bagthorpe/Grandpa, 85. Lives a quiet life, enjoying fishing and watching television with the sound turned off. Exaggerates his hearing impairment – Russell describes him as "S.D. – Selectively Deaf". It is used as an effective defence to avoid participation in the Bagthorpian rows and to particular effect against communicating with an infuriated Grandma. Often utterly forgotten by the family.
- Aunt Celia Parker, the ethereal and unemployable daughter of Maud and Alfred, and sister to Henry. Married to Russell Parker. Wears cheesecloth in the style of a dishevelled Greek heroine but her attire can stretch to resembling a waterfall. A potter, she also writes poetry and often irrelevantly quotes to the bemusement of the clan. Can finish The Times crossword faster than Mr Bagthorpe despite spending half her time bewildered by reality and wondering where she is and why. The only Bagthorpe described as beautiful and even "very tasty". Willowy with enormous blue eyes and golden hair she maintains her lithe figure by "performing Isadora Duncan-type dances, often barefoot and in the dew." This is undercut by accusations of being "wishy-washy." A vegetarian, she believes in fairy tales, often speaks in dreamy murmurs and by the seventh novel erroneously believes herself pregnant again claiming to having been visited by an "angel" and subject to the immaculate conception of twins. Has a room called The Bower which is "like a cross between the tropical house at Kew and a potting exhibition" and also features a fountain, hidden speakers and a hammock. Seems to drift in and out of consciousness. She is imprisoned in a Bagthorpian potting shed by Daisy where she perceives former inmates Max and Grandma's games of noughts and crosses, scratched in the dirt, as evidence of primeval symbolic writings from the dawn of time. Mrs Fosdyke disputes her mental health claiming she's "only half there" whilst Henry maintains she fell asleep at birth and is in effect a zombie, "permanently out to lunch", an unfit mother and cause of Daisy's delinquency.
- Uncle Russell Parker, husband of Celia Parker. He has a large private income from "something in shares", drives expensive cars very fast (on one occasion running over Thomas, Grandma's cat) and enjoys goading Henry Bagthorpe into confrontations. A well-groomed man, he cultivates the image of enjoying a life of ease and is described as a "...gin-swigging tailor's dummy." No-one has ever seen him work. However, he secretes the fact he jogs every morning at 6am and is partial to a fry-up with Daisy. His mother resembles an ageing Vogue model.
- Daisy Parker, the precocious and perpetually destructive 4-year-old daughter of Celia and Russell. Goes through phases which include flooding, arson, graffiti and morbidity (described as "Intimations of Mortality" by her mother). The latter phase marks a nadir in her popularity, which is notoriously low with all but Rosie and Grandma at Unicorn House when both William and the usually mild Jack wish her "dead and buried". Mrs Fosdyke too has little regard saying she "... should've been put down at birth." When thought lost there is little appetite for her being found. She writes elegies for the interred such as a lamb chop: "All the lams are dying/All the lams are ded" and ascribes arbitrary dates for birth and death such as a mouse living from "1692-1792 Forevver and evver" [sic]. A terror of disappearing down the plughole render her antithetical to bathing. Described as having a plump neck and "chubby" fingers. Her inadvertent slaughter of Mr Bagthorpe's goldfish by flooding the pond with curdled milk lead to the issuing of a death threat "It's that bloody infant! I'll kill her!" She develops another phase marked by incarceration in the musty outbuildings of Unicorn House with victims as diverse as tabloid journalists, Max, Grandma, Billy Goat Gruff and Celia. The latter's screaming near breakdown when left seemingly abandoned induces feelings of filicide in Uncle Parker. Daisy later becomes an enthusiastic kicker.
- Uncle Claud, a vicar. He is the son of Grace and Alfred, and brother to Henry. Married to Penelope, they have two children, Luke and Esther. He and his family are considered very boring by the rest of the Bagthorpes.
- Luke, and Esther, Penelope's and Claud's two genius children. Luke is a Young Brain of Britain, Esther a published poet.
- Aunt Penelope, an obsessive compulsive and religious woman, who is the wife of Claud. She is sufficiently worried for her children's health that she puts all library books in the oven to sterilise them before letting her children read them. The rest of the Bagthorpes were very amused to learn that on one occasion she forgot the books, burning them.
- Great Aunt Lucy, 87, an eccentric and wealthy relative of Henry, who lives in Torquay. She visits the family following Mr Bagthorpe's invitation since he seeks to benefit from her testamentary disposition. She does not believe in Time, is afraid of the full moon and has a belligerent Pekinese called Wung Foo.

=== Other characters ===
- Mrs Gladys Glenys Fosdyke "Fozzy", the Bagthorpes' extremely charmless and royal family obsessed housekeeper. Widowed from the foreman Charlie who died when struck by an errant brick. Has a marked Cockney accent and tendency to malapropisms eg "vegitinararians", "syllabubs" "Pekingese" "silver handshake" "Occasional Thurpy" and "barbicans" (for barbeque). Prone to misquoting proverbs e.g "..cow in a manger" and the troubling "...hiding my bush under a shovel". Regularly critiques the family as "that bunch of lunatics" whilst supping Guinness at the local pub The Fiddler's Arms. She is a devotee of pub culture generally, becoming a fixture in one during the disastrous Welsh sojourn. Locked in a permanent feud of mutual loathing with Mr Bagthorpe who is distressed, inter alia, by her excessive vacuuming and its deleterious effect upon the longevity of the carpet fibres and her shuffling style of perambulation. Often claims to be on the verge of insanity due to the family's antics. An expert cook who could've been a Cordon Bleu if she knew what it meant and has a considerable knowledge of French although purely in the context of recipes. She is a master of the stuffed egg in particular. Has a fear of murderers and "rapers", paranoia concerning judicial conspiracies, both the bugging of telephones and the perceived cost to the receiver of calls and a profound distrust of electrical equipment per se due to invisible and deadly waves. An avid reader of the most down market tabloids upon which she bases her various hackneyed and ill-informed opinions. And Mills & Boon novels. She becomes an unlikely media celebrity following various misapprehensions concerning "knifers" and bombers having been spotted at her residence.
- Zero, the Bagthorpes' dog. Despite lacking confidence and being near untrainable he achieves world fame through TV advertisements and earns more money than all the others. Known to have been chased by cats.
- Arry Awk, Daisy's imaginary friend and scapegoat. Known as the "most malignant and slippery member of the Unholy Alliance" and a "hell-raising entity." She buries him having forgotten he was merely meant to attend his own funeral during the Intimations of Mortality phase with the epitaph "Only me knows Arry Awk/Only me can here him tawk". He is resurrected in the sixth novel.
- Joseph O'Toole, an amiable, generously proportioned, gingery-grey bearded and silver tongued alcoholic tramp who makes his début in the seventh novel by being found dossing in Jack's room. His stench leads to kinship with the equally noisome Billy Goat Gruff and the favour of Daisy. Known as "Irish Joe" within the vagrant community and "Hobble-Gobble" to Daisy who interprets him as a hobgoblin. Wears a voluminous sheet in the guise of a sarong or sari following his first bath in decades and obtains numerous intoxicant based gratuities on Grandma's fallaciously claiming he's an eccentric multimillionaire. Has skills in spotting "a fag end in the gutter at twenty yards" and "serviceable shirts on unattended washing lines." A regular host of fleas but considered a personal guru and spiritual ancient by Celia and subject to an unlikely tug of love between her and Mrs Fosdyke (on the basis of perceived wealth). Despised by the younger Bagthorpes mainly due to his prodigious food-based appetite and its concomitant effect upon their potential consumption of any second helpings.
- Max Fosdyke, layabout son of Mrs Fosdyke and on the run for stealing £50 from his landlady's cash card after threatening violence. Infantilised by Fozzy into adolescence, she cannot comprehend he is now developed into an adult albeit a very petty criminal of weasel aspect and dwarfish scale. Has a reading age of seven and can hardly remember the alphabet but is taken in by Laura in an attempt at rehabilitation and recruited as a private investigator by Grandpa, who spots him "casing the joint", to search for the perpetually missing O'Toole. Unlike his mother he has no culinary bent despite having been a cook in the Navy, operating on the principle concerning toast "If it's brown it's done, if it's black it's buggered."
- Billy Goat Gruff, Daisy's psychotic pet goat decorated in pink ribbons and bells. Initially purchased by Mr Bagthorpe on the basis of mistaken gender. He is not house-trained, has a permanent malodorous aura and sleeps inside at The Knoll. The bane of the Welsh town of Llosilli, he is erroneously believed shot which provokes no sympathy since he's generally either "hated or detested" by the Bagthorpes.
- Little Tommy/Thomas II, Grandma's kitten whom she teaches the ways of ferocity.
- P.J, a director from Borderline Television whom Tess unwillingly invites into the Bagthorpe household after she wins a competition on The Happiest Family in England. He is thoroughly unpleasant and the Bagthorpes accordingly give him hell.
- Atlanta, the Danish au pair. William and several of his friends develop crushes on her.
- Mr Grice, Mr Bagthorpe's solicitor.
- Mr Potter, a cab driver.
- Dr Winter, Mrs Fosdyke's doctor.
- Mrs Brown, Grandma's clairvoyant. A charlatan and part-time check-out operator.
- Mrs Mavis Pye, drinking buddy of Mrs Fosdyke. She favours hirsute gentlemen.
- Mrs Flo Bates, friend of Mrs Fosdyke. Narrow-minded and "vocal on the subjects of black leather and studs."
- Patsy Page, journalist with tabloid newspaper The Sludge, she discovers Fozzy and turns her prosaic homilies into something of a sensation, taking her to London and subjecting to a makeover.
- Bill Porter, reporter with The Sludge.
- Ken Martin, Sludge photographer, entrapped in Unicorn House's spare deep freeze and deck chair outhouse.
- Dilys Junior, receptionist at the local three star hotel the Crown and Mitre who wrongly surmises Mr Bagthorpe is either the Knaresborough Knifer or another wanted criminal.

== Television series ==
The Bagthorpe Saga
- Created by: Helen Cresswell
- Starring: Edward Hardwicke; Angela Thorne; Dandy Nichols; Tim Preece; Madeline Smith
- Country of origin: United Kingdom
- No. of episodes: 6

Production
- Running time: 30 minutes

Original release
- Network: BBC1
- Release: 25 March – 29 April 1981

The Bagthorpe Saga, a six-part adaptation of the first two novels (Ordinary Jack and Absolute Zero) was broadcast by the BBC in 1981. The character of Rosie was eliminated and some of her dialogue and character attributes were given to Tess. The series was filmed in the summer of 1980 in Tetbury, Gloucestershire; Manor Farm on the Chavenage House estate was used as the Bagthorpes' home, Unicorn House. Each episode ran for 30 minutes.

=== Cast ===
- Edward Hardwicke – Henry Bagthorpe
- Angela Thorne – Laura Bagthorpe
- Phillada Sewell – Grandma
- Ceri Seel – William Bagthorpe
- Richard Orme – Jack Bagthorpe
- Ruth Potter – Tess Bagthorpe
- Dandy Nichols – Mrs Fosdyke
- Tim Preece – Uncle Parker
- Rebecca Lalonde – Daisy Parker
- Madeline Smith – Aunt Celia
