= Madabout =

- Country of origin: United Kingdom
- Original language: English
- No. of seasons: 2
- No. of episodes: 26

Production
- Running time: 22 minutes

Original release
- Network: ITV
- Release: 2 December 1981 – 10 May 1984

Madabout was a children's programme broadcast in the '80s on Children's ITV, made by Tyne Tees Television and hosted by Matthew Kelly in 1983 and 1984, and Michael Bentine in 1981–82.

== Transmission guide ==
| Series | Host | Episodes | Originally released | |
| Series | Host | Episodes | First released | Last released |
|---|---|---|---|---|
| 1 | Michael Bentine | 13 | 2 December 1981 | 24 February 1982 |
| 2 | Matthew Kelly | 13 | 6 January 1983 | 31 March 1983 |
| 3 | Matthew Kelly | 13 | 16 February 1984 | 10 May 1984 |
