= Five Children and It (TV series) =

- Based on: Five Children and It by E. Nesbit
- Written by: E. Nesbit; Helen Cresswell
- Directed by: Marilyn Fox
- Starring: Simon Godwin; Nicole Mowat; Charles Richards; Tamzen Audas
- Theme music composer: Michael Omer
- Country of origin: United Kingdom
- Original language: English
- No. of series: 1
- No. of episodes: 6

Production
- Producer: Richard Callanan
- Running time: 26 minutes

Original release
- Network: BBC1
- Release: 9 January – 13 February 1991

Five Children and It is a 1991 TV series directed by Marilyn Fox and starring Simon Godwin, Charles Richards, Nicole Mowat, Tamzen Audas and Francis Wright, and is based on the novel Five Children and It by E. Nesbit. The six-part series first aired its first episode on BBC1 on 9 January and its last on 13 February 1991. It follows a family of Edwardian children and a wish-granting fairy. The novel has also been adapted as a titular 2004 feature film starring Kenneth Branagh, Zoë Wanamaker and Eddie Izzard and directed by John Stephenson.

== Plot ==
Five siblings, Robert, Anthea, Cyril, Jane, and their younger brother, known as the Lamb, spend the summer at their uncle's country house. While exploring a nearby gravel pit, they discover a Psammead, or Sand Fairy, which can grant one wish each day. The effects of each wish last only until sunset, and the children soon discover that their wishes often have unintended consequences.

Their wishes include becoming wealthy, growing wings and travelling to other times and places. adventures, or even trips to far-off times and places. Attempts to improve their circumstances repeatedly lead to trouble, such as receiving old gold coins that cannot easily be spent and becoming so beautiful that strangers no longer recognize them. Over the course of the series, the children become more cautious about using the Psammead's magic and eventually part with the creature after their adventures come to an end.

== Cast ==
- Simon Godwin as Cyril
- Nicole Mowat as Anthea
- Charles Richards as Robert
- Tamzen Audas as Jane
- Francis Wright as The Psammead
- Lewis Wilson as The Lamb
- Alexander Wilson as The Lamb
- Laura Brattan as Martha
- Paul Shearer as Andrew
- Penny Morrell as Lady Chittenden
- David Garlick as Groom
- Mary Conlon as Mother
- Philip Rham as Sir Wulfric
- Desmond McNamara as Mr. Peasmarsh
- Angela Sims as Vicar's Wife
- Tim Matthews as Cyril When Beautiful
- Leslie Mills as Police Constable
- Anthony Wilcox as Robert When Beautiful
- Andy Nyman as Baker's Boy

== See also ==
- Five Children and It
- The Return of the Psammead
- The Phoenix and the Carpet
