= Jeanne Downs =

British television presenter

Jeanne Downs (born 6 January 1967) is a former presenter of Children's ITV, which is the brand name used for the majority of children's television output on ITV in the United Kingdom. She is also a singer-songwriter, TV producer, voice over artist and property developer.

== Children's ITV ==
On Monday 3 April 1989 the contract to produce Children's ITV was taken over by an independent production company, called Stonewall Productions. As well as doing the regular afternoons service, in the summer of '89, they also had to provide a mornings service too, which was a rival to But... First This! on Children's BBC. Downs & radio presenter Clive Warren were both hired to present the mornings service, which ran from 9:25am to 12:30pm on weekdays throughout July and August. Also, the puppet character Scally the Dog often appeared in the mornings with them too. Additionally during this time, they both took separate turns as stand-ins for fellow Children's ITV presenter Jerry Foulkes in the afternoons, when he was away on holiday.

On 2 January 1990 (following Foulkes' departure on 22 December 1989) Downs took over co-presenting the Children's ITV afternoons service, along with Scally. Warren returned to Children's ITV in summer 1990, to present the mornings service on his own, but he and Downs did occasionally swap roles, with him doing the afternoons and she doing the mornings instead sometimes. In September 1990, Children's ITV's afternoon service became slightly longer, now running from 3:55 to 5:10pm each weekday. Downs and Scally continued to present Children's ITV's afternoons service until 5 April 1991, when Central Television regained the contract to produce Children's ITV back from Stonewall. They were replaced by a solo Tommy Boyd, who had already presented Children's ITV once before in the 1980s, and he assumed the presenter role on 9 April 1991.

On 3 January 2003 CITV celebrated its 20th birthday with a special one-off programme called CITV's 20th Birthday Bash. Downs and Scally appeared on the programme alongside other past and present Children's ITV presenters such as Roland Rat, Matthew Kelly and Michael Underwood.

In 2021, Downs alleged Australian actor Craig McLachlan had groped her in May 1990 while they were live on air while he was a guest on her show. McLachlan has denied the allegation, describing it as "false, uncorroborated and never the subject of a complaint". In December 2020, McLachlan had been found not guilty of seven charges of indecent assault and six charges of common assault after being charged with indecently assaulting four women during a stage production of The Rocky Horror Show. This followed a joint investigation by the Australian Broadcasting Corporation and Fairfax Media in January 2018 where several allegations were made against McLachlan.

Downs said she was compelled to speak out publicly about the alleged incident following the airing of a paid television interview on the Seven Network's Spotlight program where McLachlan accused his co-stars of fabrication due to their jealousy of his success. Downs claims she had earlier attempted to raise her allegation in the media anonymously through newspapers such as Sunday Mirror and Daily Mail Australia but her request for anonymity had been denied.

== Other work ==
After she left Children's ITV in 1991, Downs pursued a singing career and was a signed recording artist with Perfecto, Sony and Wildlife Records, also providing backing vocals for many artists, including Steve Hackett (a former member of the rock group Genesis). She is involved with music production, songwriting, Jeanne also helped to devise and manage Pop Academy a 'pop school' at the ACM in Guildford, Surrey. She is also a founder member of a 'live' band called Madison Square. She also does much voice-over and narration work, including many commercials. She is married to record producer Aron Friedman. She also designs, builds and remodels properties in Los Angeles and Surrey.
