= Paul Burrell =

Butler to Diana, Princess of Wales

Paul Burrell RVM
- Born: 6 June 1958 (age 68); Grassmoor, Derbyshire, England
- Occupations: Butler; writer; media personality
- Spouses: Maria Cosgrove (m. 1983; div. 2016) Graham Cooper (m. 2017)
- Children: 2
- Website: paulburrellrvm.com

Paul Burrell RVM (born 6 June 1958) is a former servant of the British Royal Household and latterly butler to Diana, Princess of Wales.

== Background and Royal Household career ==
Burrell was born and raised in Grassmoor, Derbyshire, a coal-mining village. His parents were Graham Burrell and Beryl Burrell, née Kirk. His father was a lorry driver and it was initially assumed he would go to work in the local colliery, but he had decided at the age of eight that he wanted to work at Buckingham Palace. This was after a trip to London, in which he witnessed the Changing of the Guard. He attended William Rhodes Secondary School in Chesterfield before entering High Peak College in Buxton, where he studied hotel management.

Burrell entered Royal Service at age 18 as a Buckingham Palace footman, becoming Elizabeth II's personal footman a year later. He was nicknamed "Small Paul", to distinguish him from a taller footman, Paul Whybrew, who was known as "Tall Paul".

In 1987, Burrell joined the household of Charles and Diana at Highgrove House, Gloucestershire, acting as butler to the princess until her death in August 1997. Burrell said that Diana, Princess of Wales, had described him as "the only man she ever trusted". Books produced by Burrell state that Diana was very fond of him, and that she would describe him as her "rock" for his support during trying times, but Diana's mother, Frances Shand Kydd, detested him and believed that he was "just another hanger-on grasping at Diana's celebrity".

== Events since the death of Diana ==
=== Royal Household and inquest-related ===
Burrell has been routinely mentioned in relation to Diana. At times the coverage has been adverse; for example, in a 2002 case where he was charged with theft related to Diana's possessions. The trial collapsed after evidence was given that Queen Elizabeth II had spoken with him regarding disputed events and a public-interest immunity (PII) certificate was presented by the Crown Prosecution Service.

During the investigation into Burrell's possession of property belonging to Diana, the police learned of a recording allegedly made by her in which former royal servant George Smith described allegations that he had been sexually assaulted by a senior member of Prince Charles's household and he had seen the same courtier involved in a sex act with a member of the royal family, subsequently identified by contemporary reports as Prince Charles. The courtier Michael Fawcett, a close aide to Prince Charles who was "hated" by Diana due to his influence over her husband, obtained an injunction in 2003 preventing publication of details of the allegation concerning the prince. The recording, subsequently referred to in the press as the "rape tape", was reportedly kept by Diana in a mahogany box at Kensington Palace and was last known to have been in Burrell's possession. Burrell confirmed that he had heard the recording. Diana's sister, Lady Sarah McCorquodale, also reportedly heard the tape and told police that it had been among items kept in the box that Burrell had been asked to look after. The tape could not subsequently be located, and Burrell denied responsibility for its disappearance, saying that the items had disappeared from the butler's pantry. Smith's allegations were investigated by police, but the Crown Prosecution Service concluded that there was insufficient evidence to proceed, while the man whom Smith accused denied the allegations. Police also disclosed that Smith had made two further allegations in 1999, one of which he later withdrew and the other of which resulted in no arrest. Smith later admitted he had lied about Prince Charles, stating that he did so because he was angry with another royal servant.

In January 2008, Burrell appeared as a witness at the inquest into the death of Diana. Burrell said he had approached a Catholic priest about a private marriage between Diana and the heart surgeon Hasnat Khan, and denied rumours that Diana was about to announce her engagement to Dodi Fayed. He was also questioned on a letter to him from Diana in October 1996, in which she said her husband was planning to have her killed to make the path clear for him to marry Camilla Parker Bowles. The coroner dismissed notions of a "secret" that Burrell knew about Diana that he swore he "would never reveal," as detailed at the end of his book, A Royal Duty.

Other matters were discussed in relation to the case, many alleged and not proven, including allegations of perjury at the coroner's court, and allegations about his personal life.

On 18 February 2008, The Sun newspaper reported that Burrell had admitted, on tape, that he had not told "the whole truth" during his appearance at the Diana inquest; he also said he had thrown in a "few red herrings". Some reports suggested that Burrell could be charged with perjury. The Sun said it would hand the tape to the court on 19 February 2008.

Burrell was criticised for copying Diana's letters and his integrity was called into question. The coroner, Lord Justice Scott Baker, said: "In the end, there is an important issue as to the credibility of the witness."

=== Memoirs ===
In 2003, Burrell released a memoir, A Royal Duty, which follows his career as a member of the Royal staff. It deals with his time as butler to the Prince and Princess of Wales at Highgrove House in Gloucestershire, his move to Diana's staff at Kensington Palace after her divorce from Prince Charles, and the dismissal of the theft charges against Burrell. The book was sold internationally and was updated in a paperback edition in 2004. Its publication led to a rift with Buckingham Palace. Princes William and Harry accused Burrell of betraying their mother's confidences. In a joint statement before publication, they called the book "a cold and overt betrayal."

=== Florist ===
In 2001, Burrell opened a florist's in Farndon, Cheshire.

== Media career ==
Burrell has appeared multiple times on the reality programme I'm a Celebrity...Get Me Out of Here!, first on the fourth series in November 2004, placing second after 18 Days on the show. In 2018, he participated in the fourth season of the Australian version, as an intruder on Day 17 of the show. He placed 9th, being evicted on Day 37. In 2023, he appeared in I'm a Celebrity... South Africa, a special All-Star edition of I'm a Celebrity with other former notable contestants.

He also appeared as a judge and trainer on Australian Princess in 2005, and in March 2006 appeared on Countdown in Dictionary Corner.

In early 2006, he appeared as Richard Gere on ITV's Celebrity Stars in Their Eyes, singing "Razzle Dazzle" from Chicago, the film version of the Broadway musical. A further TV appearance in September 2006 was followed by another in 2015.

In February 2017, Burrell and his house in Peckforton appeared in an episode of ITV's UK reality TV series Through the Keyhole with Keith Lemon. In August 2017, he appeared in Series 2 of the Channel 5 UK reality TV series In Therapy. In November 2017, a television documentary, Diana: The Royal Truth, for which Burrell was the primary source, was released in the UK.

== Personal life ==
Burrell was married to Maria Cosgrove. They met while working in Buckingham Palace and have two sons.

In 2017, a divorced Burrell announced he was marrying his partner, Graham Cooper, a corporate lawyer he had met ten years before . This occurred on 2 April 2017 in Bowness-on-Windermere.

In July 2019, Burrell sold his florist shop as a going concern and retired to live with his husband in Peckforton, Cheshire.

Burrell is a fan of Wrexham Football Club and St Helens Rugby Football Club. His pastimes include travelling and painting churchyard scenes.

In January 2023, Burrell announced that he had received a diagnosis of prostate cancer in 2022 and was receiving treatment. On 16 November 2023, during an appearance on the ITV British breakfast television programme Lorraine, he announced that he had been given the "all clear" regarding his cancer but would need further follow up and medical care.

== Honours ==
He was awarded the Royal Victorian Medal in November 1997 for services to the Royal Family.

== Bibliography ==
- Entertaining with Style (1999) ISBN 978-0233997476
- In the Royal Manner: Butler to Diana (1999) ISBN 978-0446526418
- A Royal Duty (2003) ISBN 978-0718147204
- The Way We Were: Remembering Diana (2006) ISBN 978-0007246366
- The Royal Insider: My Life with the Queen, the King and Princess Diana (2025) ISBN 978-1408734216
