= CITV =

British children's television brand (1980–2026)

- Final logo used from 2013 to 2026
- Country: United Kingdom
- Network: ITV (1980–2023); ITV2 (2023–2026)

Programming
- Language: English
- Picture format: 1080i/1080p HDTV (downscaled to 576i on terrestrial television)

Ownership
- Owner: ITV plc
- Parent: ITV Digital Channels
- Sister channels: ITV1; ITV2; ITV3; ITV4; ITV Quiz

History
- Launched: 29 December 1980; 45 years ago (ITV block); 11 March 2006; 20 years ago (channel); 2 September 2023; 3 years ago (ITV2 block)
- Closed: 27 August 2023; 3 years ago (ITV block); 1 September 2023; 3 years ago (channel); 10 April 2026; 6 months ago (ITV2 block)
- Replaced by: ITVX Kids (channel; programming)
- Former names: Watch It! (1980–1983)

Links
- Website: itv.com

Availability

Terrestrial
- Freeview: Channel 203

CITV (standing for Children's ITV) was a British children's brand of ITV plc, a free-to-air television channel, and the name of programming blocks on the ITV network and ITV2. CITV launched on 29 December 1980 as Watch It!, then later rebranded on 3 January 1983 as Children's ITV, as a late afternoon programming block on the ITV network for children aged 6 to 12. (Note: At this point, there was only one "ITV" channel in any given area, transmitter overlap and split weekday/weekend franchises aside, and "ITV" was solely a generic/collective name for the various regional commercial television stations.) It replaced the earlier Watch It! branding and introduced networked in-vision continuity links between programmes. These links were originally pre-recorded from a small London studio until 1987, when Central won the contract to produce live links from their Birmingham studios. In 2004, presentation of CITV was relocated to Granada Television in Manchester, which saw the block's in-vision continuity being discontinued. In 2013, the operations moved to ITV Granada's MediaCityUK studios in Salford.

In 2006, CITV launched as a digital channel on Freeview. The channel primarily ran repeated ITV content and acquisitions daily from 6am to 9pm. Following the removal of its original afternoon slot in late 2006, a CITV programming block on the ITV network continued to air on weekend mornings from 6am to 9:25am as part of the ITV Breakfast time slot. CITV did not have a +1 simulcast, unlike the rest of ITV's portfolio of channels, and was only simulcast in HD on Sky Glass.

On 22 July 2023, ITV launched a new children's hub on the ITVX streaming service, ITVX Kids, as an eventual replacement for the CITV channel. At 9pm on 1 September 2023, the channel closed with a promotional loop informing viewers of the move to ITVX.

On 2 September 2023, the children's block was moved to feature every morning on ITV2 during breakfast time, from 5am to 9am (later shortened). Shows broadcast and promoted during the block were sourced from the ITVX Kids streaming service. The block retained usage of the pre-existing CITV branding, following the channel's closure. The block, along with the last current vestige of CITV, wound down on 10 April 2026.

== History ==
=== Watch It! and Children's ITV: Early years (1980–1989) ===
Before being known as Children's ITV, the timeslot for children's programmes on the ITV network was branded as Watch It!, which started on 29 December 1980, and was presented live by the duty continuity announcer in each ITV region.

The notion of networking children's continuity was first suggested within ITV in the early 1970s, but with fierce regional identities prevalent, including scheduling, presentation, and programming, the idea stalled until the late 1970s, when the IBA began to express concern that most ITV shows for children were not consistent or fully networked. On Thursdays, the ITV regions were able to broadcast whatever programmes they wished; many non-children's programmes appeared, such as Looney Tunes and Little House on the Prairie. In December 1980, ITV announced its first concerted effort at a more coherent approach to children's output, with the introduction of the Watch It! block each weekday from 4:15pm to 5:15pm, after the IBA continued to emphasise issues.

Watch It! was conceived by the promotions department at ATV, with the implementation of the branding differing from region to region, thus it was always transmitted locally and never provided on a network feed. ATV provided different animations each season, to update what was available to each company. Most regions would use their own station announcers during Watch It! airtime.

Shortly after the start of new franchises in 1982, some ITV stations raised concerns that Watch It! had not gone far enough to address previous concerns. Central's Controller of Children's Programmes, Lewis Rudd, suggested a different approach to the presentation method. As a result, the Central Promotions Department came up with the initial concept for Children's ITV. The rebrand was devised, and links between programmes were pre-recorded using presenters drawn from the constituent programmes. The networking arrangements were similar to those already in place for the transmission of schools programmes, and the links were played out from Central and the component programmes came from the supplying companies.

Watch It! was replaced by Children's ITV and began on 3 January 1983, between 4 and 5:15pm every weekday afternoon, the extra 15 minutes being filled by a repeat of one of the preschool programmes shown at lunchtime the same day. Initially featuring a different presenter each month (usually from children's television, including Matthew Kelly, who became the block's original presenter while also hosting Madabout), the links were pre-recorded in advance in a small studio at a London facility called Molinare, using a single locked-off camera. The first set design was a rocket ship and was used for the first few months. The concept was eventually discontinued, and the set and style of presentation used began to reflect the presenter doing the presenting that month or the programme that they starred in (including Pat Coombs as "The Dressmaker" from Yorkshire Television's Ragdolly Anna in a room of antiques in April 1984).

By 1985, the links were still being recorded, but using a common, stylised set known as "Network Control", which allowed the presenter to be joined by guests in the studio for interviews. The exterior of this fictitious location also featured in the animations and stings. Technical considerations often left the system flawed, as each programme was transmitted from a different playout source (usually from that of the originating ITV company; for example, if the first programme was Rainbow, which came from Thames TV, their staff would have to run the tape while the presenter was talking, and would not show the region's skyline ident before the programme's titles). With each link being pre-recorded (played out by Central), errors often occurred on air, as programmes would be rolled early and links were cut short. Programmes would also fail to appear, leaving the presenter static. Because each link was recorded for the slot available, the presenter would hold the final pose for several moments so that transmission controllers at Central could maintain material being broadcast if necessary. Pre-recording the links also meant that last-minute schedule changes could not be easily referenced.

In September 1985, the BBC rebranded their own children's presentation with the introduction of Children's BBC. Using the BBC1 announcer booth at BBC Television Centre, later dubbed "The Broom Cupboard", Phillip Schofield provided links between the programmes. This format of a small self-operated continuity studio using one single presenter (and an occasional puppet) continued in largely the same format until 1993, but was broadcast live and allowed for a looser, more relaxed style of presentation than the rival Children's ITV service.

Children's ITV subsequently went live in early June 1987. Using the small presentation studio at their Broad Street studios, which had become available since in-vision continuity for the Central region was discontinued, former Central announcers Gary Terzza and Debbie Shore presented live links from a set built to look like a transmitting station. Although the studio space was small, the designers' use of a plate glass mirror gave the effect of a much larger set. The new live format gave brought a great deal of flexibility; timings could be altered, schedule changes reflected, and breakdowns dealt with in a continuous manner. In 1988, the format was refreshed again with a new single presenter, Mark Granger, replacing Terzza and Shore, in a smaller, more basic studio set which included in-vision monitors showing the VT clock of the next scheduled item.

=== Stonewall Productions era (1989–1991) ===
On 3 April 1989, the independent production company Stonewall Productions won the contract to produce and revamp the Children's ITV presentation. Stonewall Productions was operated by Michael Jackson, a Central employee who used his expertise to put a successful application together.

Whereas Central had restricted links to the station's former in-vision presentation studio, Stonewall chose not to use a fixed set, instead presenting links from various areas of Central's headquarters at Broad Street in Birmingham. These utilised a rotating team of presenters consisting of Clive Warren, Jeanne Downs, Jerry Foulkes, and large puppet Scally the Dog (which was first introduced during Granger's final few months under Central).

=== Central regains control (1991–2001) ===
Central regained the contract to produce the continuity links on 9 April 1991, choosing to revert to a small in-vision studio using only one regular presenter, Tommy Boyd, and use their own new branding package. During the 1991–1993 era, greater relevance was being placed throughout television on promotional trailers as a way of effectively detailing areas of the schedule to viewers who might not know about them; consequently, the 1993 invitation to tender for the provision of the Children's ITV service specified a minimum number of high quality trailers that the successful applicant were required to create over the term of the contract. Containing a sizeable promotions department, and a credible reputation for presentation within the ITV network, the contract remained with Central.

The Broadcasting Act 1990 and subsequent 1991 ITV franchise auctions also brought about numerous changes to the output and structure of ITV's children's output. Both saw several regions end in-house production of its programming in favour of commissioning independents, such as Tetra Films, which housed children's personnel formerly of Thames. Alongside this, the network's subcommittee on children's productions across its regions was superseded in favour of one dedicated controller of children's and daytime programming at the newly-established ITV Network Centre, first occupied by Dawn Airey.

Soon after assuming control of Children's ITV, Airey removed its in-vision presentation; beginning on 15 February 1993, Steve Ryde instead provided live out-of-vision continuity links featuring a variety of animated characters and settings. Ryde additionally had creative input into on-screen promotions devised alongside producer-director Tony Jopia, and occasionally appeared on-screen. On 6 September 1993, the block was extended to start at 3:30pm, a move made possible by shifting ITV's lunchtime preschool programming broadcasts at 12:10pm to mid-afternoon. Around the same time, Children's ITV began to be informally referred to as CITV. However, the "Children's" was not removed from the logo until 2 September 1996, accompanying the introduction of a digital on-screen graphic (DOG).

CITV logo (26 May 1998 – 7 September 2003)

Presentation for the service was relocated in 1997 when Central moved into newer, smaller studios at Gas Street Studios in Birmingham. A heavily revamped live in-vision service and logo were introduced on 26 May 1998 by the new controller of CITV output, Nigel Pickard, who had replaced Airey's successor Vanessa Chapman in January. With responsibility for the revamp under Pickard, Steve Ryde (now-producer of the block's presentation) selected Stephen Mulhern and Danielle Nicholls as the new in-vision presentation team out of over 900 auditions. CITV was initially broadcast live daily on weekdays from a small studio at Gas Street Studios during this period; a new Sunday morning block was also introduced prior to the May revamp, with live in-vision presentation launching for it later that year in September. Outside broadcasts additionally occurred on occasion.

Coinciding with the refresh and his subsequent commissioning of the highly-popular SMTV Live, Pickard sought to reinvigorate the block with more live entertainment content targeting an older pre-teen and teenage audience, an aspect of the service which had been given less prominence for some time due to ITV allocating spend on other areas such as Formula One coverage. Preschool programming was also revamped, with several of the block's longest running preschool shows, which aired weekly (and in some cases, twice-weekly), decommissioned as part of the revamp, in favour of newer programmes designed to be offered daily in the style of the BBC's daily preschool offerings.

By then coming fully under Carlton Television's branding, Central retained the contact to produce CITV once again in 1999, successfully defeating two rival bids from other ITV companies. Presentation was refreshed several times by their in-house promotions team, with one of the service's longest-lasting visual identities launching in September 1999. Under the design and direction of Carlton's Dave Hickman and Amanda Robinson, 3D animation firm Aldis Animation produced many of the strand's short computer-generated idents and break bumpers. CITV's online presence was additionally expanded, with its first fully-fledged standalone website launched by ITV and web design agency Workhouse on 25 October 1999. Shortly afterwards, in-vision presentation started sharing studio space with the West Midlands edition of Central News. This allowed more room for a larger, specially stylised set, created by prop manufacturers Dorans Propmakers.

Despite indicating he had more work to do in interviews, Pickard left his role at CITV in June 2000 to instead join BBC Children's, where he would go on to launch the CBBC and CBeebies channels. Prior to leaving ITV, Pickard had begun discussions about the idea of a separate CITV digital channel to launch in 2001. CITV strands had already been broadcast for a short period on the then-new ITV2.

=== Cutbacks (2001–2006) ===
CITV logo (8 September 2003 – 10 March 2006)

In 2001, CITV's budget was cut by 17% due to the advertising recession, leading to CITV controller Janie Grace publicly criticising Carlton and Granada Television, by that time the main controlling forces in the network, for underinvestment in ITV's children's service. Grace went further and complained to the ITC, claiming CITV was unlikely to fulfil its range of programming commitments in expensive genres like drama the following year. In an attempt to combat this, Grace considered commissioning more lower-cost productions such as video diary documentaries. Grace also sought support from the ITC for the creation of a separate CITV Ltd company, which would allow more children's output to be made in-house, a proposal which ultimately fell apart due to the need for a change in the law and support from the Office of Fair Trading. Around the same time, greater emphasis was placed on viewer engagement with the launch of a CITV text messaging service and interactive online vote events; a new preschool sub-strand was also introduced under the name "Telly Tots", replacing the in-vision presentation between 3:20 and 3:40pm with a CGI-animated town of cartoon mascots. Books, magazines and video tapes were introduced to tie-in with the new strand. However, the block suffered more further cuts during 2002, making CITV's total budget reduction 25% at £30 million. Grace's experiment in introducing a daily weekday schedule to the strand inspired by American broadcasters such as Nickelodeon (where she had previously worked) additionally failed, after initially increasing viewership.

Despite its cutbacks and falling ratings, the ITC contended in its 2002 performance review that CITV had "sustained an impressive schedule", gave "factual material a fresh look", and "continued to produce good dramas". In-house promotions additionally maintained graphics refreshes, and presentation producers Sid Cole and Martyn Fox embarked the block on tour at theme parks during the summer months of 2001 and 2002. Soon after CITV celebrated its 20th anniversary in January 2003, Grace left her post, just before her predecessor and former Television South colleague Nigel Pickard became ITV's new overall Director of Programmes. Pickard pledged to produce 80 more hours of children's programming against a target of 520 hours in 2002, and to extend their range for the inclusion of more factual and topical series, as well as mixed entertainment and drama. Once again, concerns about CITV and its structure were highlighted by Angus Fletcher, president of Jim Henson Television Europe, and Anne Wood, founder of Ragdoll Productions, as it could only earn money from a then-unreliable advertising market, unlike BBC Worldwide, where preschool shows such as Teletubbies, Tweenies, and Bob the Builder became key earners for the corporation via merchandising and licencing.

Former BBC Children's and Granada Kids producer Steven Andrew replaced Grace as ITV's controller of children and youth programming, overseeing the merger of Carlton and Granada's children's departments that he had previously made prominent calls for whilst serving as director of the latter. Andrew returned focus to the possibility of launching a separate CITV channel, which until then had been put on hold indefinitely by the 2001–2002 budget cuts. On-screen, various changes to the in-vision presentation team saw no less than eight host additions and replacements over the course of four years, and a September 2003 brand refresh coincided with a reduction in studio space and time for the service. By 31 August 2004, all in-vision continuity was replaced by an out-of-vision voice-over once more (provided by promotions producer Tim Dann), while the newly-formed ITV plc announced the eventual closure of its presentation and transmission facilities in Birmingham, signalling the end of CITV presentation from Central. Presentation was fully relocated to Granada in Manchester by early 2005.

After a brief period surrounding the Granada and Carlton merger in which CITV's budget was slightly increased again by £7.5 million, a third round of cuts occurred due to the perceived rising costs of original production and the imminent effects on advertising revenues from a ban by Ofcom on "junk food" advertising within children's schedules from 2007, as well as increasing competition from CBBC and numerous other digital children's channels for new programmes (especially imported cartoons, typically from the United States). In summer 2006, ITV shut down its in-house children's programming unit as part of the then on-going process of restructuring ITV Productions, publicly blaming the closure on the competitive production environment. The closure, and subsequent confirmation that the network were seeking to lobby Ofcom in an effort to reduce its required children's programming hours, saw CITV controller Estelle Hughes resign. Despite this, ITV denied any intention of removing its children's programming from the network's schedule altogether. By January 2007, CITV's weekday afternoon strand on the main ITV network had ended, making the recently-launched CITV channel the main outlet for ITV children's programming.

=== ITV simulcast (2006–2023) ===
A simulcast of the CITV channel was broadcast on ITV during weekend mornings, continuing after the brand's original weekday afternoon strand was discontinued. These simulcasts ended alongside the channel itself in 2023, with the final regular children's television slot on ITV ending just before 08:25am on 27 August 2023. The move came 40 years and eight months after children's programmes on the ITV network were first brought under the Children's ITV brand.

=== ITV2 programming block (2023–2026) ===
On 2 September 2023, one day after the closure of the CITV channel, ITV2 launched a new breakfast time block from 5am to 9am everyday with shows featured on ITVX Kids on ITVX. Retaining the CITV branding, the children's strand replaced teleshopping and reruns; shows featured on the breakfast time block included Jurassic World Camp Cretaceous and Scooby-Doo. Prior to that, the CITV block on ITV2 was originally aired from 1998 to 1999.

On 9 June 2025, the block's timeslot was reduced to under two hours, airing from 6:00am to 7:45am, due to ITVBe's programming moving to ITV2 following the channel's closure.

The block eventually closed on 10 April 2026 with a small selection of children's programming remaining on ITVX under the ITVX Kids vertical. CBBC acquired some of its programming, including What's New, Scooby-Doo? (which had previously aired on the channel) and Teen Titans Go!.

Despite the closure, a CITV ident was accidentally used on ITV2 before leading into Love Island on 13 July 2026.

== CITV channel ==
=== Original plans (2000–2005) ===
Plans for a standalone CITV digital channel were first reported as early as 2000, but were placed on hold indefinitely following its budget cuts in 2001. When Steven Andrew became controller of children and youth programming at ITV plc in 2003, he stated that "no kids strategy is complete without us being able to play in the cable and satellite world. In fact, we can't not do this and ultimately survive as a kids player in the future". ITV director and former CITV controller Nigel Pickard additionally admitted the network's output for children had become "a minnow in a sea of twenty channels".

In early 2004, ITV confirmed plans for the channel were underway again, but as a joint venture. Charles Allen, chief executive of ITV plc, claimed to not believe in ITV creating a new channel by itself in an "over-populated market", whilst the network held talks with Nickelodeon and Disney.

On 11 April 2005, ITV announced they had entered a partnership with Nickelodeon to launch a free-to-air channel dubbed "INK" (ITV Nickelodeon Kids). The venture would allow the two companies to share programmes across each other's networks. However, three months later it was stated that the partnership had been cancelled, and that ITV would instead launch a children's channel alone. Both parties failed to reach an agreement on the exact structure of the new venture and how it would be branded, with ITV stating they "just got to the point of thinking that it was more sustainable for us to do it ourselves", and that the deal "fizzled out over a period of time". Nickelodeon described the decision to end the talks as "a mutual backing away". ITV officially revealed their independent plans for a channel in August, although no launch date was given, it was confirmed that it would timeshare with ITV4, which was scheduled to launch on 1 November.

On 14 December 2005, it was announced that the ITV News Channel, which by then had downgraded its hours due to the launch of ITV4, would close down at the end of January 2006, in order for the launch of the CITV channel in February. A few days later, ITV announced the closure had been rescheduled to 23 December, with the channel effectively ending that day, leaving ITV4's downtime unoccupied until February.

=== Channel history (2006–2022) ===
The CITV channel's launch was delayed to 11 March in February 2006. As a result of a "comprehensive" rebranding and problems with "clearing the digital rights to children's programming", it was again postponed by another four weeks.

Promotions for the channel began on 20 February, including an online countdown clock running to the channel's launch date. As it had become standard for Freeview channel launches, the channel was allocated an EPG number well before transmission started. Initially, a static "coming soon" graphic was shown, followed by a preview video loop running from late February 2006 until the launch.

CITV logo (11 March 2006 – 1 November 2009)

The channel launched on 11 March 2006 at 9:25am, with a simulcast of Holly and Stephen's Saturday Showdown being the first programme to air following a countdown graphic. It initially launched on Freeview Channel 75, Homechoice (now known as TalkTalk TV), and Telewest Channel 734, and was added to Sky Channel 624 on 8 May 2006 and NTL Channel 76/602 on 6 June. Additionally, simulcasts of CITV Breakfast (previously known as GMTV2, originally broadcast on ITV2, then ITV4) were carried on weekdays between 6am and 9:25am. The channel was broadcast daily from 6:00am to 6:00pm, although in 2007, the channel's broadcast ended earlier at 12:30pm on weekends in favour of sports coverage on ITV4. Its launch coincided with a full visual identity rebrand; though out-of-vision voiceover announcements remained, the refresh was reported to be intended as "a return to the kind of brash children's ITV of more than a decade ago".

On 5 February 2008, ITV4 extended its broadcast hours to air 24 hours a day. As a consequence, the CITV channel moved to the space on multiplex A on Freeview originally held by ABC1 from English and Scottish transmitters and S4C from Welsh transmitters, which meant that viewers of the latter were unable to receive the channel on Freeview unless they could receive transmissions from England. ITV's closure of its in-house children's programming production unit in 2006 had coincided with a "commissioning freeze", leaving only repeats and a number of unaired new productions for scheduling on the channel. A conclusion of this was confirmed on 7 March 2008, alongside the first renewals of a select few series sourced from independent production companies.

CITV logo (2 November 2009 – 13 January 2013)

In July 2009, ITV announced CITV was the only channel among its portfolio to receive an increased budget. Emma Tennant, the then-controller of CITV, told a children's Showcomotion conference that there would be smaller commissioning budgets for the ITV channels except CITV, which Tennant stated it had an increase in budget but was not predicted to "spend the additional money on original commissions". It was made clear that due to tight budgets, the slightly increased spend could nonetheless simply lead to more acquisitions rather than new original programmes being commissioned. On 2 November 2009, the CITV channel was relaunched with a new logo and visual identity to match ITV1 as part of ITV plc's corporate look. The channel's preschool strand was revamped and renamed "Mini CITV" at the same time. On 9 January 2012, a change in the forward error correction mode on the multiplex allowed CITV to broadcast in Wales on Freeview.

On 21 December 2012, the channel aired its first live programme since 2006, a 45-minute CITV special of Text Santa, ITV's Christmas charity appeal. A year later, a series of ten-minute programmes titled Help with Hattitude in aid of the aforementioned appeal was produced for the channel. Both programmes were produced in-house by ITV Studios. The channel's promotions team headed by Dave Hickman additionally continued to produce original short-form content, such as the multi-BAFTA award-winning Share a Story campaign. On the weekend of 5 and 6 January 2013, the channel celebrated the thirtieth anniversary of its brand with a marathon of archive programming, officially known as the Old Skool Weekend. A rebrand was introduced on 14 January 2013, to coincide with ITV's corporate rebranding. CITV adopted a "yellowy-orange" logo with new bumpers as well as child voiceovers.

On 22 February 2016, the channel extended its on-air hours to 9pm. Following its move from the former Granada studios to MediaCityUK in 2013, and several rounds of redundancies in the years prior, CITV's dedicated in-house promotions and presentation unit was closed in November 2016. All remaining creative responsibilities involving its content were handed to personnel in charge of other ITV channels. At the same time, ITV abandoned its programming director role specifically for children's television last occupied by Jamila Metran, leaving existing channel and genre teams to direct CITV's output. After removing all preschool programming from the channel in 2013, ITV reintroduced these shows outside of CITV under the LittleBe block on ITVBe in September 2018.

From 2019 until its 2022 closure by the UK Government, the BFI's three-year Young Audiences Content Fund pilot scheme provided grants for additional content on CITV alongside its small remaining investment into commissions. On 19 September 2022, due to the state funeral for Queen Elizabeth II, the channel's normal programming was replaced by ITV London's feed. This was in contrast to CBBC and CBeebies, which did not carry the BBC's coverage.

=== Channel closure ===
On 10 March 2023, ITV plc announced that it would close the CITV channel in the autumn, with most of its programming moving to ITVX Kids, which launched on 22 July, on its streaming service ITVX.

ITVX launched the ITVX Kids FAST channel on 12 July 2023.

The CITV channel closed at 9pm on 1 September 2023. The channel's remaining promos were adjusted to promote ITVX prior to its closure. The last programme to air on the channel was an episode of The Rubbish World of Dave Spud titled "Moonbreaker". The channel closed shortly afterwards with a loop and caption card informing its viewers that its content could now be seen on ITVX.

On 1 October 2023, CITV's 602 Freesat slot was removed, a month after the closure. In late February 2024, CITV's live streams on ITVX and other remaining platforms were removed, after repeating the ITVX loop since its September closure.

== Programming ==
Programming between 6 and 9:25am was controlled by ITV Breakfast (previously GMTV), who, having rebranded the vast majority of their GMTV children's output as CITV, used the space to simulcast their programming at weekends on the ITV network and CITV Breakfast on weekdays. ITV began airing at 9:25am, controlling the rest of the day's programming. When it first launched, GMTV sold all airtime for the channel, making it the first ITV plc-owned channel not to be sold by the in-house sales team. Airtime sales later returned to ITV.

Some of the channel's most notable programming was specially commissioned by CITV, such as Horrid Henry, Mr. Bean: The Animated Series, Grizzly Tales for Gruesome Kids, Thunderbirds Are Go, and Sooty. A number of other programmes were sourced from different broadcasters internationally.

=== List of programmes (British and imported) ===
- Albie
- Art Attack
- Avenger Penguins
- Bad Influence!
- Bangers and Mash
- Bernard's Watch
- Boohbah
- Bookaboo
- Button Moon
- Canimals
- Children's Ward
- Chocky
- Construction Site
- Count Duckula
- Dangermouse
- Don't Eat the Neighbours
- Dramarama
- Dream Street
- The Dreamstone
- Emu's TV programmes
- Engie Benjy
- Eye of the Storm
- The Famous Five
- Fetch the Vet
- Finders Keepers
- Fleabag Monkeyface
- The Foxbusters
- Fraggle Rock
- Fun House
- Gladiators: Train to Win
- Grizzly Tales for Gruesome Kids
- Hilltop Hospital
- Horrid Henry
- How 2
- Hurricanes
- Huxley Pig
- Jungle Run
- King Arthur's Disasters
- Knight School
- Knightmare
- Krankies Television
- Life Force
- Miffy and Friends
- Mike and Angelo
- Mopatop's Shop
- Mr. Bean: The Animated Series
- My Parents Are Aliens
- Palace Hill
- Press Gang
- Planet Sketch
- Pocoyo
- Puddle Lane
- The Raggy Dolls
- Rainbow
- The Riddlers
- Rolf's Cartoon Club
- Rosie and Jim
- Round the Bend
- Snug and Cozi
- Sonic X
- The Sooty Show
- Spatz
- Teletubbies: Let’s Go!
- Thunderbirds Are Go
- Time Riders
- Timmy Towers
- Tiny Planets
- The Tomorrow People
- ToonMarty
- Tots TV
- Watership Down
- What About Mimi?
- Where's Wally?
- Wizadora
- The Wombles
- The Worst Witch
- Your Mother Wouldn't Like It
- Zig and Zag
- ZZZap!

== Ratings ==
The CITV channel launched with a full-day average of 33,000 viewers and a 2.5% share of the child audience. This was higher than other channels Cartoon Network (20,000, a 1.5% share), Boomerang (28,000 a 2.1% share), and Nickelodeon (26,000 a 2.0% share). The channel peaked at 4:30pm with Bratz gaining 51,000 viewers and a 3.6% share.

The channel took a 0.2% audience share in its first week, compared to CBBC's 0.6%, Cartoon Network's 0.4%, Boomerang's 0.4%, and CBeebies' 1.4%. Its overall ratings share for March 2006 was 0.1%; by April 2006 this had risen to 0.2%, 0.3% followed in May. In August 2006, the channel became the most popular commercial children's channel between 6am and 6pm. On 6 January 2013, the CITV channel received its highest viewing figures: Danger Mouse, which was shown as part of the "Old Skool Weekend" to celebrate CITV's 30th anniversary, attracted 578,000 viewers.
