= Roger Singleton-Turner =

British television director

- Occupations: Television director, producer and educator
- Employer: University of Sunderland

Roger Singleton-Turner is a British television director, known for a number of series including The Demon Headmaster for the BBC.

== Directing ==
Singleton-Turner began his directing career in 1974 on the long-running story-telling programme, Jackanory. He continued to direct for the series until its end in 1996, as well as adapting many books, including Winnie the Pooh, Treasure Island and The Hobbit.

He was the second director ever to work on the long-running iconic children's drama Grange Hill. He directed around 25 episodes in all, for which he won a BAFTA for Best Children's Programme in 1980, along with executive producer Anna Home.He directed The BBC Childrens Drama Series The Treasure Seekers in 1981

Singleton-Turner also directed 1991's Watt on Earth. In 1996, he directed The Demon Headmaster, arguably his best-known work, short-listed for BAFTA, the RTS and the Prix Jeunesse in 1997.

His other works include Gruey & and Gruey Twoey by Martin Riley, Happy Families, Mortimer and Arabel, The Wild House and CITV's Welcome to orty-Fou for Carlton Television. He produced and co-directed, with Steve Wright, series 3 and 4 of The Ark commissioned by ITV Factual from Granada Kids, transmitted in 2004.

Singleton-Turner has trained other directors at the BBC and has taught on various courses at different Universities in the UK and Thailand. He has recently spent a lot of his time at the University of Sunderland, where he taught TV Studio modules.

== Books ==
Singleton-Turner wrote: Cue & Cut (2011), Television and Children (1994), Continuity Notes (1988) and Children Acting on Television (1999). He was also a contributor to Dad's Army - Walmington goes to War (2001, edited by Richard Webber).
