= Helen Cresswell =

English children's writer (1934–2005)

Helen Cresswell (11 July 1934 – 26 September 2005) was an English television scriptwriter and author of more than 100 children's books, best known for comedy and supernatural fiction. Her most popular book series, Lizzie Dripping and The Bagthorpe Saga, were also the basis for television series.

Cresswell's TV work included adaptation of her own books for television movies and series: Lizzie Dripping (two series, 1973–75), Jumbo Spencer (1976), The Secret World of Polly Flint (1987), and Moondial (1988). Works by others that she adapted for TV include The Haunted School, Five Children and It (1991, from the 1902 novel), The Phoenix and the Carpet (1997), The Famous Five (1995–96), and The Demon Headmaster (1996–98).

== Life ==
Cresswell was born in Kirkby-in-Ashfield, Nottinghamshire. Her mother arranged Greek-language instruction for her daughter. At age 12, she was in hospital for a year with spinal problems. She was educated at Nottingham High School for Girls, and at King's College London, where she graduated in English literature. Cresswell and her childhood sweetheart Brian Rowe (married 1962, dissolved 1995) had two children. On 26 September 2005, she died in her home in Eakring, Nottinghamshire, aged 71, from ovarian cancer.

== Writer ==
Cresswell had great "popular impact" because she "diversified into writing for television, in 1960, with a script for what was then called Jack Playhouse, bringing simple storytelling to BBC children's TV." She tried writing for adults but succeeded with the child audience. Her first book was published in 1960, Sonya-by-the-Shore, and the Jumbo Spencer series followed. Yet she considered herself a poet until The Piemakers (Faber, 1967) won both "success with young readers" and approval from critics. It was a commended runner-up (Note: Today there are usually eight books on the Carnegie shortlist. According to CCSU some runners-up through 2002 were Commended (from 1954) or Highly Commended (from 1966). There were about 160 commendations of both kinds in 49 years including four for 1967 (one highly commended) and three each for 1969, 1971, and 1973.) for the Carnegie Medal from the Library Association, recognising the year's best children's book by a British subject.

She was one of three or four runners-up for the Carnegie Medal on three later occasions: namely, for The Night Watchmen (1969), Up the Pier (1971), and The Bongleweed (1973). In 1989, she won the Phoenix Award from the Children's Literature Association, recognising The Night Watchmen (Faber, 1969) as the best children's book published twenty years earlier that did not win a major award.

Although the "Demon Headmaster" TV series (1996–1998) was a success, her "star waned" as the BBC "turned to the tougher damaged heroines of Jacqueline Wilson, typified by Tracy Beaker, resident of The Dumping Ground." (Wilson introduced Beaker in 1991 and "The Story of Tracy Beaker" on television ran from 2002 to 2006.) Her daughter, Caroline, believed that Winter of the Birds (1976) had been her mother's own favourite work. Cresswell once explained, "I write a title, then set out to find where that particular road will take me", and Caroline recalled, "Mum never plotted her books, she just wrote."

The BBC aired a six-part TV series, Five Children and It (1991), using Cresswell's adaptation of the 1902 novel by E. Nesbit. Next year Cresswell's print sequel was published, The Return of the Psammead (BBC Books, 1992), which was the basis for a TV sequel of the same name in 1993. She also adapted the second book in Nesbit's trilogy, The Phoenix and the Carpet (1904), for a television serial transmitted in 1997.

== Selected works ==
- Sonya-by-the-Shore (1960), her first children's book
- The White Sea Horse (1964)
- Pietro and the Mule (1965)
- Where the Wind Blows (1966)
- The Piemakers, illus. V. H. Drummond (Faber, 1967)
- The Signposters (1968)
- The Sea Piper (1968)
- The Night Watchmen, illus. Gareth Floyd (Faber, 1969)
- The Outlanders (1970)
- At the Stroke of Midnight (1971)
- Up the Pier (1971)
- The Beachcombers (1972)
- The Bongleweed (1973)
- The Key (1973)
- The Trap (1973)
- Cheap Day Return (1974)
- Shady Deal (1974)
- White Sea Horse and Other Sea Magic (1975)
- The Winter of the Birds (1976)
- A Game of Catch with Ati Forberg (1977)
- My Aunt Polly (1979)
- Dear Shrink (1982)
- The Secret World of Polly Flint (1982)
- Moondial (1987)
- Ellie and the Hagwitch (1987)
- Dragon Ride (1987)
- Trouble (1988)
- Time Out with Peter Elwell (1990)
- Weather Cat (1990)
- Five Children and It (1991)
- The Return of the Psammead (1992), a sequel to the Five Children books by E. Nesbit
- Almost Goodbye, Guzzler with Judy Brown (1992)
- The Watchers: A Mystery At Alton Towers (1993)
- Classic Fairy Tales (1994), retelling traditional fairy tales
- Stonestruck (1996)
- Snatchers (1997)
- Sophie and the Sea Wolf (1997)
- The Little Sea Pony (1997 )
- The Little Sea Horse (1998)
- The Little Grey Donkey (1999)
- Mystery Stories (2003)
- Rumpelstiltskin (2004), retelling the Brothers Grimm fairy tale

=== Lizzie Dripping stories ===
- Lizzie Dripping (1973)
- Lizzie Dripping by the Sea (1974)
- Lizzie Dripping and the Little Angel (1974)
- Lizzie Dripping and the Witch (1974)
- Lizzie Dripping on Holiday (1994)

=== Posy Bates stories ===
- Meet Posy Bates (1992)
- Posy Bates and the Bag Lady (1994)
- Posy Bates, Again! (1994)

=== Two Hoots series ===
The series was illustrated by Martine Blanc and published by Ernest Benn Limited.

- Two Hoots (1974)
- Two Hoots Go to the Sea (1974)
- Two Hoots in the Snow (1975)
- Two Hoots and the Big Bad Bird (1975)
- Two Hoots Play Hide-And Seek (1977)
- Two Hoots and the King (1977)

=== Winklesea series ===
- A Gift from Winklesea (1971)
- Whatever Happened in Winklesea? (1991)
- Mystery at Winklesea (1995)

=== Bagthorpe Saga ===
- Ordinary Jack (1977)
- Absolute Zero (1978)
- Bagthorpes Unlimited (1978)
- Bagthorpes Versus The World (1979)
- Bagthorpes Abroad (1984)
- Bagthorpes Haunted (1985)
- Bagthorpes Liberated (1989)
- The Bagthorpe Triangle (1992)
- Bagthorpes Besieged (1997)
- Bagthorpes Battered (2001)
