= Jessica Fox (actress) =

British actress

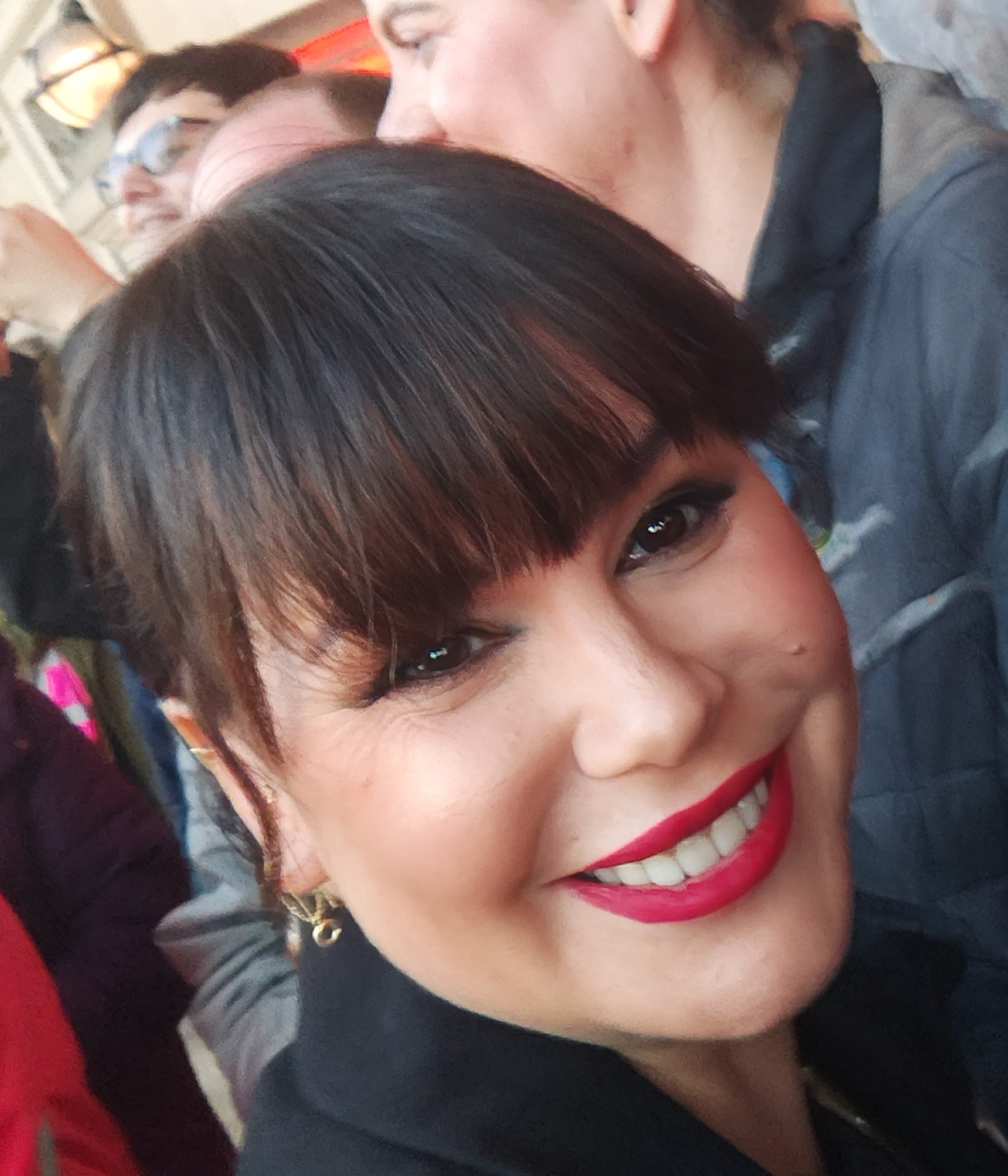
- Fox arriving at the Hollyoaks 30th anniversary party in 2025
- Born: Jessica Ann Fox; 19 May 1983 (age 43); Maidenhead, Berkshire, England
- Education: Redroofs Theatre School
- Occupation: Actress
- Years active: 1992–present
- Known for: Role of Nancy Hayton in Hollyoaks; The Worst Witch; The Phoenix and the Carpet
- Spouse: Nicholas Willes (m. 2020)
- Children: 1

Jessica Ann Fox (born 19 May 1983) is an English actress. She played Enid Nightshade in the children's television series The Worst Witch and later gained soap opera roles as Belle Wise in Crossroads and Nancy Hayton in Hollyoaks.

== Career ==
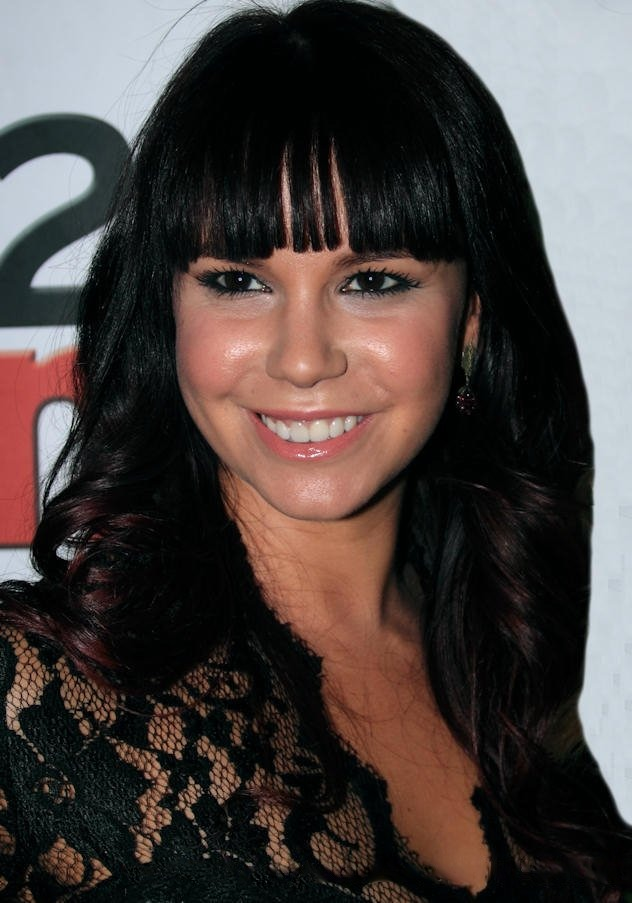
Fox in April 2011

Fox was born in Maidenhead, Berkshire. Fox received her acting training at the Redroofs Theatre School in Maidenhead, Berkshire, England. Her early television and film roles included The Muppet Christmas Carol, in which she provided the voice of the Ghost of Christmas Past. Shortly afterwards her career in television was furthered with roles in The Angel of Nitshill Road, May and June, Trial and Retribution, The Bill, The Detectives. She played the main role of Anthea in the 1997 BBC children's serial The Phoenix and the Carpet. She then moved to comedy, playing the "naughty but nice" Enid Nightshade in three series of The Worst Witch and the slightly naughtier Enid in the spinoff Weirdsister College. Co-starring with Sarah Lancashire, she then appeared in the role of Rusty Dickinson in Back Home.

Fox then gained her first soaps operas role, playing Belle Wise in Crossroads, and made a guest appearance in children's show Powers. In 2005, she was cast as newcomer Nancy Hayton in the Channel 4 soap opera Hollyoaks.

== Personal life ==
On 15 October 2022, Fox announced she was pregnant with her first child. Fox supports the charity Breast Cancer Care.

== Filmography ==
Year	Title	Role	Notes
1992	The Muppet Christmas Carol	Ghost of Christmas Past	Film (Voice)
1996	The Detectives	1st Schoolgirl	Guest role
1997	The Ruth Rendell Mysteries	May	Guest role
1997	The Phoenix and the Carpet	Anthea	Main role
1998–2001	The Worst Witch	Enid Nightshade	Regular role
1999	Holy Joe	Esperanza Garcia	Film
2000	Trial & Retribution	Fiona Meadows	Guest role
2001	Back Home	Virginia 'Rusty' Dickinson	Film
2001	Weirdsister College	Enid Nightshade	Guest role
2001-2002	The Bill	Rachel Monroe	Guest role
2002	The Forsyte Saga	June	Guest role
2003	Crossroads	Belle Wise	Regular role
2004	Powers	Lex	Guest role
2005–present	Hollyoaks	Nancy Hayton	Regular role
2008–2012	Hollyoaks Later	Nancy Hayton	Regular role

== Awards and nominations ==
Year	Award	Category	Series	Result	Ref.
2012	British Soap Awards	Best On-Screen Partnership	Hollyoaks	Nominated	
2014	British Soap Awards	Best Actress	Hollyoaks	Longlisted	
2014	National Television Awards	Serial Drama Performance	Hollyoaks	Longlisted	
2016	British Soap Awards	Best On-screen Partnership	Hollyoaks	Nominated	
2017	National Television Awards	Serial Drama Performance	Hollyoaks	Longlisted	
2019	National Television Awards	Serial Drama Performance	Hollyoaks	Longlisted	
2021	TRIC Awards	Soap Actor of the Year	Hollyoaks	Longlisted	
