= Bagthorpes Unlimited =

- First edition (publ. Faber & Faber)
- Author: Helen Cresswell
- Language: English
- Publisher: Faber & Faber
- Publication date: 1978
- ISBN: 0-571-11245-5 (first edition)
- LC Class: PZ7 .C8645 Bag

Bagthorpes Unlimited is the third children's novel in The Bagthorpe Saga, a series by author Helen Cresswell. It was first published in 1978.

== Plot summary ==
The book begins with a burglary at Unicorn House, the dwelling of the Bagthorpe family. This burglary causes Grandma to decide that she needs to have her family around her, so she organizes a family reunion. When their very talented, fastidious, and religious cousins come to visit, all the Bagthorpes go on quests to obtain immortality, hoping to best their talented relatives. Meanwhile, Daisy has the wrong idea about suitable presents for Grandma.
