= Jean Broke-Smith =

British television personality

Jean Broke-Smith is an English etiquette, deportment and grooming teacher.

== Career ==
Jean was the principal of the Lucie Clayton School of grooming and modelling for thirty years, during which time she supervised a curriculum that included etiquette and deportment. Graduates of the school include actress Joanna Lumley. Prior to that she trained as fashion designer, milliner and make-up specialist, and herself was a model. She is a regular expert contributor for TV, radio, newspapers and often appears on live news programmes and is interviewed on live radio 'link-ups'.

In recent years Broke-Smith has appeared in a series of television programmes on the subject of manners. She was 'head-teacher' in Ladette to Lady, a reality television programme that emulated the curriculum of a finishing school; she helped struggling bed and breakfast owners fix up their businesses on BBC1's B&B the Best (which is currently syndicated in the United States on Vibrant TV Network); she was the etiquette 'expert' on The Family, another reality-television show in which a large extended family were sent to live in a large mansion house with a full domestic staff; she was one of the judges of the Australia Princess series, and the original NBC series American Princess, which set out to teach young women how to conduct themselves like princesses and make them fit to marry a prince. She appeared on Faking It, teaching a girl from the north of England to present herself as a society 'lady'; in Snobs; and as an etiquette 'expert' on Britain's Next Top Model.
